= Cadillac Sixty Special =

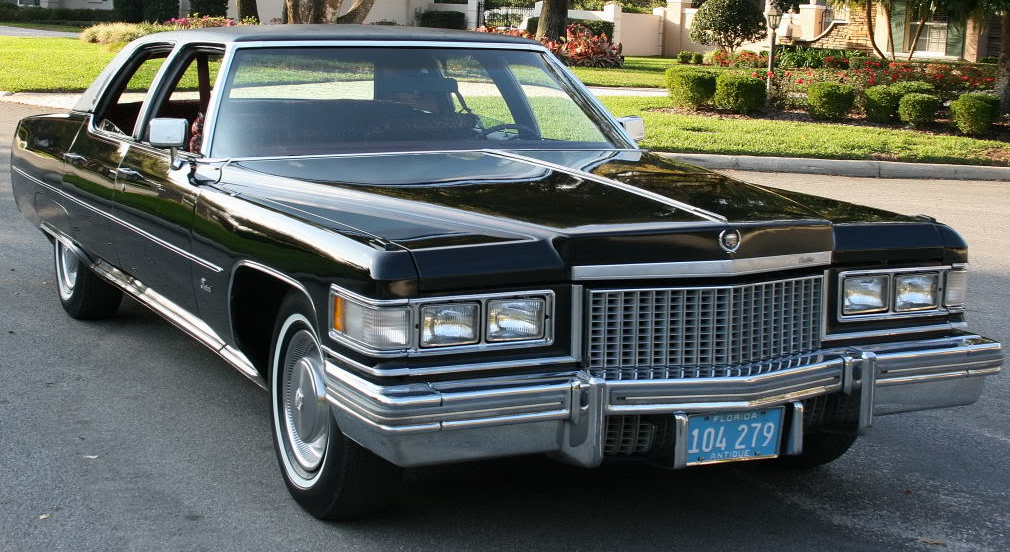
- 1975 Cadillac Sixty Special Brougham

Overview
- Manufacturer: Cadillac
- Production: 1938–1942; 1946–1976; 1987–1993

Body and chassis
- Class: Fullsize luxury car
- Layout: FR layout (1938–1976); Transverse front-engine, front-wheel drive (1987–1993)

Chronology
- Predecessor: Cadillac Series 65

Cadillac Sixty Special is a name used by Cadillac to denote a special model since the 1938 Harley Earl–Bill Mitchell–designed extended wheelbase derivative of the Series 60, often referred to as the Fleetwood Sixty Special. The Sixty Special designation was reserved for some of Cadillac's most luxurious vehicles. It was offered as a four-door sedan and briefly as a four-door hardtop. This exclusivity was reflected in the introduction of the Fleetwood Sixty Special Brougham d'Elegance in 1973 and the Fleetwood Sixty Special Brougham Talisman in 1974, both offered as a single trim package below the Series 70 limousine. The Sixty Special name was temporarily retired in 1976, returned in 1987, and continued through 1993.

== 1938–1941 ==
First generation
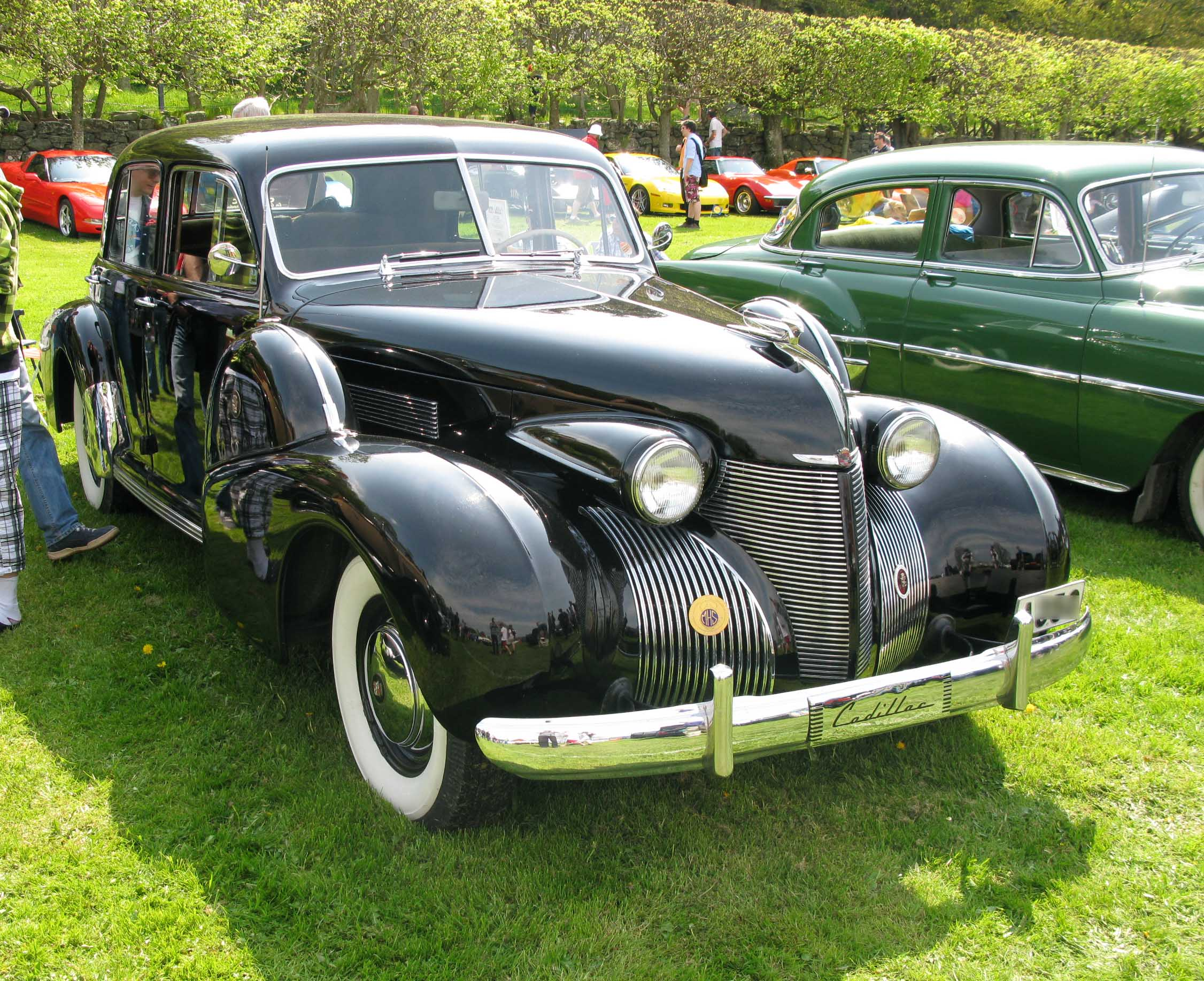

Overview
- Model years: 1938–1941
- Assembly: Detroit Assembly, Detroit, Michigan, U.S.
- Designer: Bill Mitchell

Body and chassis
- Body style: 4-door sedan
- Layout: FR layout
- Platform: C-body

Powertrain
- Engine: 346 cu in (5.7 L) Monobloc V8
- Transmission: 3-speed selective synchromesh manual 4-speed Hydra-Matic automatic

Dimensions
- Wheelbase: 1938–40: 127.0 in (3,226 mm); 1941: 126.0 in (3,200 mm)
- Length: 1938: 207.6 in (5,273 mm); 1939: 214.3 in (5,443 mm); 1940: 216.9 in (5,509 mm); 1941: 217.2 in (5,517 mm)
- Width: 1938–40: 75.6 in (1,920 mm); 1941: 80.0 in (2,032 mm)
- Height: 64.5 in (1,638 mm)
- Curb weight: 4,000–4,500 lb (1,800–2,000 kg)

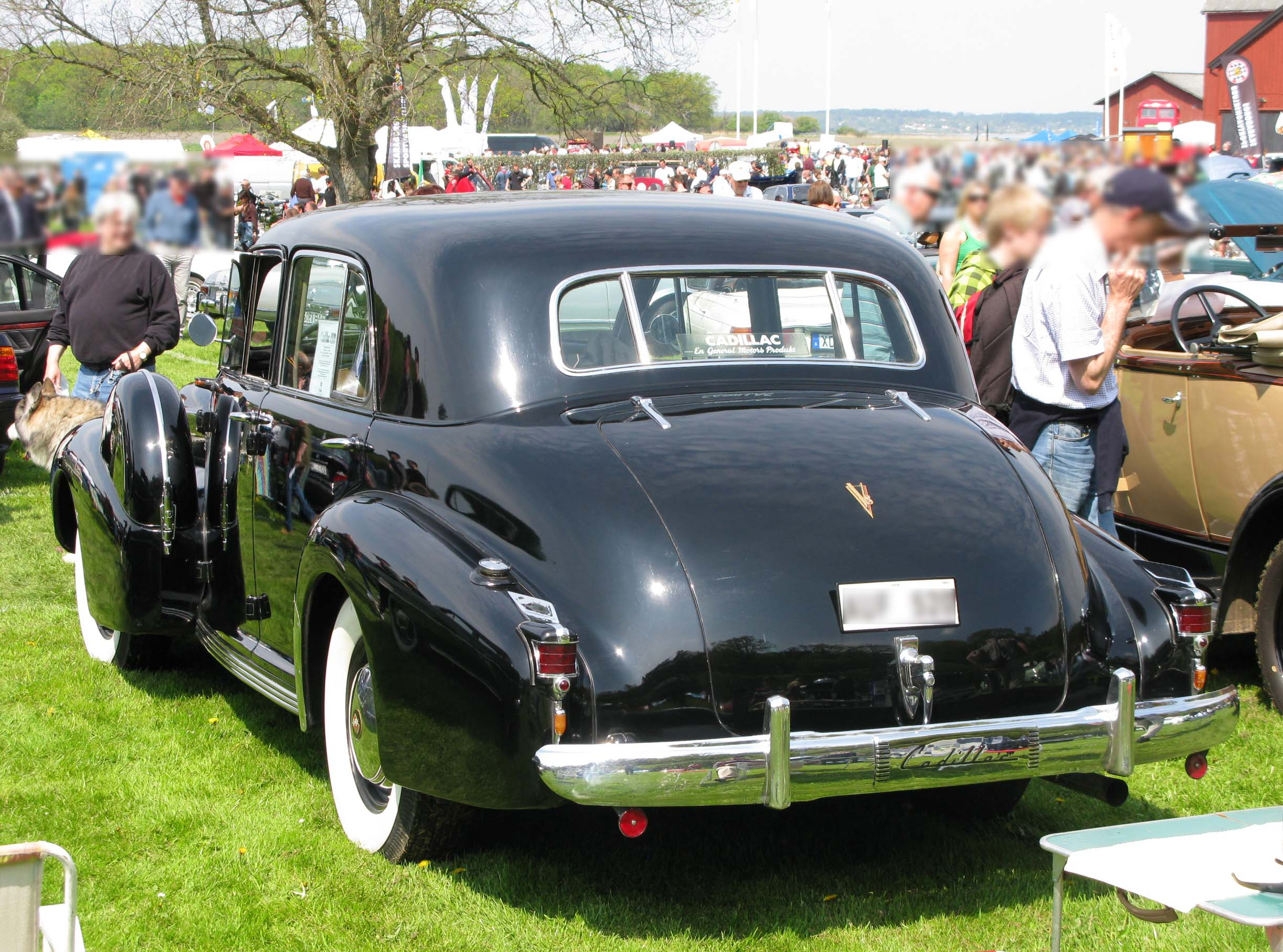
1939 Cadillac 60 Special rear

In 1938 the Harley Earl-Bill Mitchell designed Sixty Special replaced the Series 65, slotting it between Cadillac's entry level line, the "Series 60", and the "Senior" large-bodied Series 70 Cadillacs. Although all first-generation 60 Specials were built at the Fleetwood Plant, the 60 Special was marketed as a Fisher Body car in 1938 and 1939.

The new four-door sedan, designed to look like a convertible sedan, showcased trend-setting features including a completely integrated, coupe-like trunk (which launched "three-box" sedan styling); no running boards (which all makes soon followed); convertible-style doors with bright metal window frames (Bill Mitchell called the '38 60 Special "the first hardtop"); a "four-window" canopy with more glass area than any Cadillac before; a steeply-raked windshield and four front-hinged doors. Contrary to what was then prevailing practice for luxury automobiles, the new Sixty Special was intended as an owner-driven car, rather than a chauffeur-driven one.

It was built on a 127.0-inch (3,230 mm) wheelbase - 3-inch (76 mm) longer than the standard Series 60 cars. The new Sixty Special utilized a unique "X" frame underneath, which allowed the 4,170 lb (1,890 kg). car to sit within its frame. This not only gave the new Cadillac the stiffest chassis on the market, but it was also 3 inches lower than other Cadillacs - with no sacrifice in headroom. The disappearance of running boards along the side and its lack of a heavy belt line molding made the sleek car appear even lower. More important, it allowed shoulder and hip room to increase by over 5 inches without an increase in overall width. When combined with the brand-new column-mounted shift lever, the cars offered true six passenger comfort. The Sixty Special was powered by Cadillac's standard 130 hp (97 kW), 346 cu in (5.67 L) V8 engine.

In its debut year, 3,703 Sixty Specials were delivered, at a base cost of US$2,090 ($48,375 in 2025 dollars) - it was a success in every measure. The new Sixty Special outsold every other Cadillac model in its first year accounting for 39% of all Cadillacs sold. In 1938, aside from the standard 4-door sedan, two prototype models were built on the Sixty Special body - two very dashing four-door convertibles (one owned by GM executive, Larry Fisher, which was demolished by Harley Earl in a traffic accident and one sent to Europe, which was later recalled and consumed by GM Engineering in structural tests in preparation for the 1940 "Torpedo" bodies), plus one Sixty-Special coupe (driven personally for two years by GM President, Bill Knudsen).

A not well-received new front end, which was patterned on the Lincoln Zephyr and lacked the visual punch expected by Cadillac buyers, a modest change in trim level, and some new options appeared for Sixty Special in 1939. First among the new options was a retractable metal panel above the front seat called a "Sunshine Turret-Top Roof", a predecessor to the type of sunroof that would not become more commonplace until the mid-1970s. The sliding roof, patented by GM's Ternstedt Hardware division, was unlatched and slid back into a recess built into the rear portion of the main roof where it would lock in place. Second was an optional retractable division glass in between the front and rear seats. This partition did not have a header in the roof, only channels between the door posts for the retractable glass to travel. The 1938 price of $2,090 remained for 1939 as well. More than 5,500 Sixty Specials were built for 1939, accounting for 40% of all Cadillacs sold, but only 280 of them were equipped with the sun roof option (of those 280 sun roof optioned cars, 55 of them were also equipped with the retractable glass partition). Special orders in 1939 included a convertible sedan built on the Sixty Special chassis for Prince Frederik of Denmark.

Starting in 1940, and for the remainder of its existence, the Sixty Special would be Fleetwood marketed, enjoying higher-priced molding, trim and upholstery like the Series 75 and 90. Thus it took over the Series 70's place, which was dropped for the 1938 model year, as Cadillac's most luxurious owner-driven large model, a role it would fill through 1976. For 1940, the price (for the third year in a row) and general styling remained the same, with only modest trim changes. Of special note is that 1940 was the last year that side-mounted spare tires (optional on all Cadillacs, including Sixty Special) were offered. The Sixty Special line expanded to four models this year: Touring Sedan (the base model), Imperial sedan (priced at $2,230, it featured a retractable glass partition between the front and rear seats), and two open-front Town Car models (one style with a painted roof, the other with a leather-covered roof). These two very formal cars had a removable roof section over the front seat and a glass division window. Of the Sixty Specials built in 1940, 4,242 of them were the Touring model. There were 113 Imperials (including 3 that were also equipped with the sun roof), and lastly, only 15 Town Car models. Of the 15, 9 had the painted metal roof (priced at $3,465), and 6 were the formal leather-covered roof version (priced at $3,820).

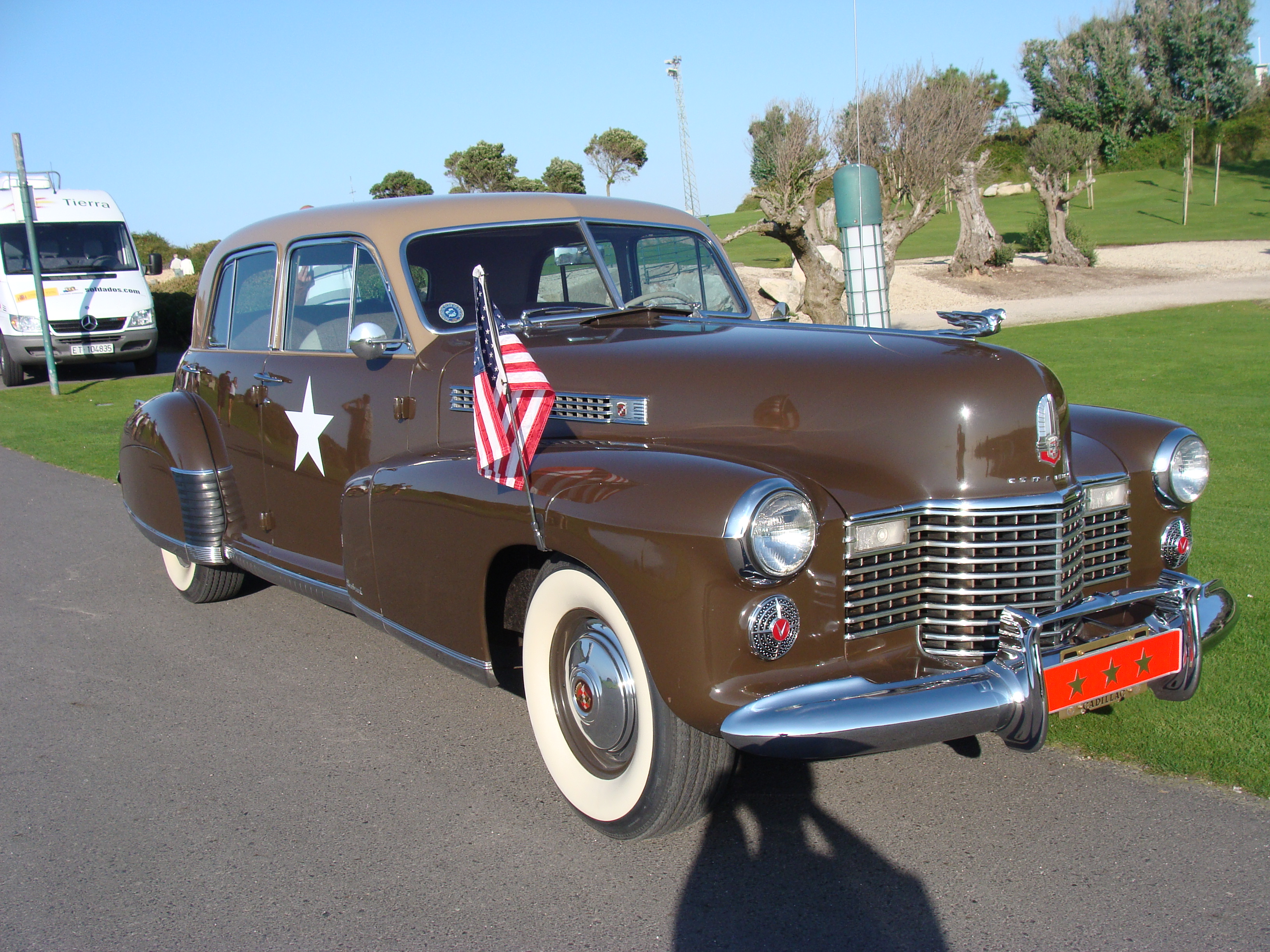
1941 Cadillac 60 Special

1941 was the last year of Harley Earl and Bill Mitchell's original Sixty Special design, as an all-new 1942 model was in the works. Many consider the 1941 to the most beautiful of this series, though Mitchell himself favored the clean lines of the original 1938 model. For the first time, Cadillac had its own front end design—the wider than high "tombstone" grille with a forward-jutting center section flanked by flat side sections — that would identify Cadillacs for years to come; the new grille appeared as a horizontally-oriented rectangle when viewed head-on hence the nickname. Other changes were longer front fenders that terminated with extension caps attached to the front doors, fully engulfed the lowered, widely positioned headlights and (in concert with a new hood) filled the formerly vacant area adjacent to the engine compartment; the rear fenders now held full skirts as standard. For 1941, the wheelbase was reduced by 1 inch (25 mm), down to 126 in (3,200 mm). Sixty Specials showed a $105 price increase (for the first time) to $2,195. Power was still supplied by the same 346 cu in (5.67 L) Cadillac engine as before, but was now rated at 150 hp (110 kW). Production totals include 3,878 Touring sedans (including 185 with the sun roof option), and 220 Imperial sedans (now priced at $2,345). Only 1 Sixty Special Town Car was made this year and used on the auto show circuit before being purchased by film director, Cecil B. DeMille. Featuring the leather-covered roof, it was the last one to come from Cadillac-Fleetwood.

There were nearly 17,900 Sixty Specials made from 1938 to 1941, including about a dozen custom bodied versions.

== 1942, 1946–1947 ==
Second generation
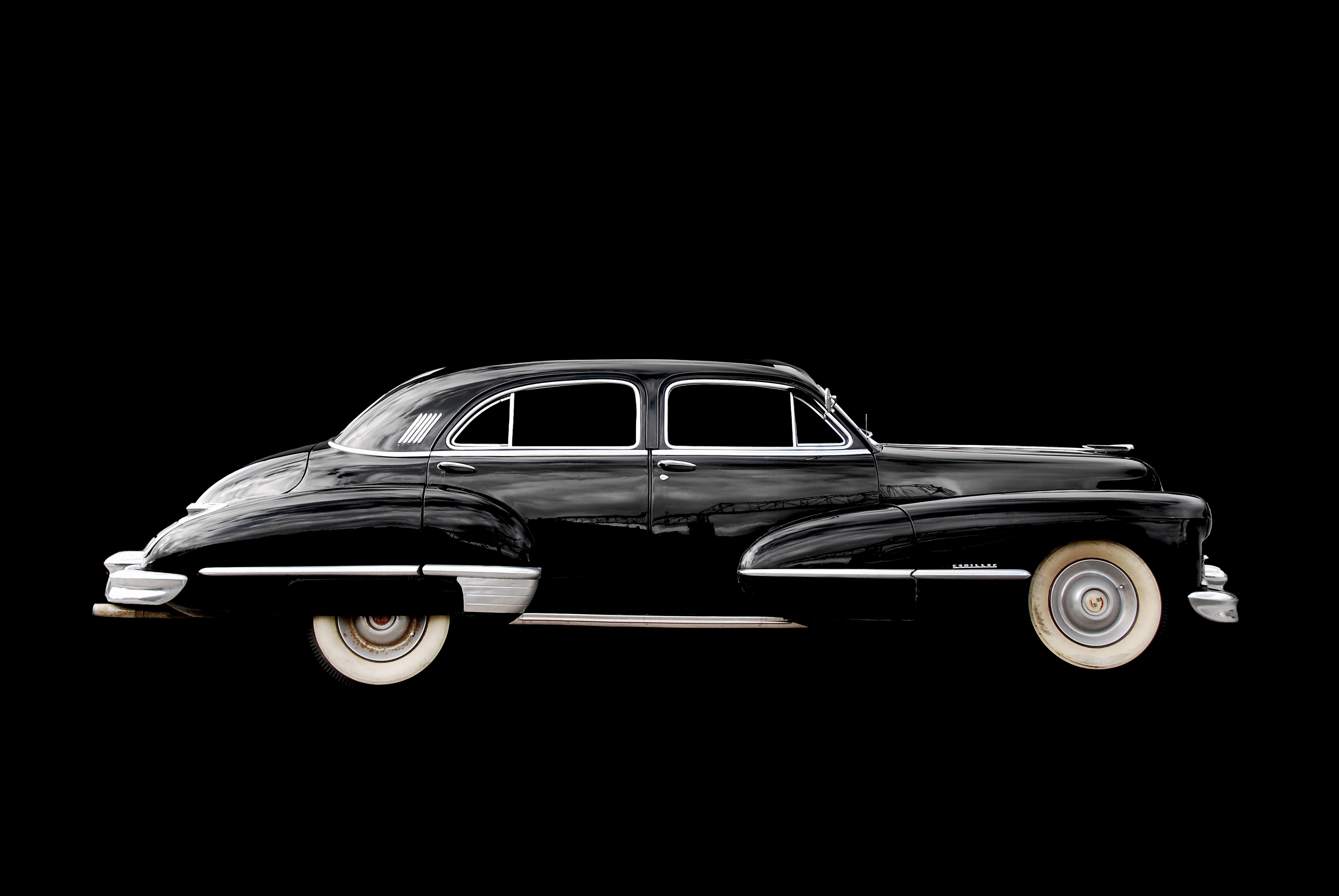

Overview
- Model years: 1942, 1946–1947
- Assembly: Detroit Assembly, Detroit, Michigan, U.S.
- Designer: Bill Mitchell

Body and chassis
- Body style: 4-door sedan
- Layout: FR layout
- Platform: C-body

Powertrain
- Engine: 346 cu in (5.7 L) Monobloc V8
- Transmission: 3-speed selective synchromesh manual 4-speed Hydra-Matic automatic

Dimensions
- Wheelbase: 133.0 in (3,378 mm)
- Length: 1942: 224.0 in (5,690 mm); 1946: 224.8 in (5,710 mm); 1947: 223.2 in (5,669 mm)
- Width: 80.8 in (2,052 mm)
- Height: 63.1 in (1,603 mm)
- Curb weight: 4,500–4,600 lb (2,000–2,100 kg)

The Sixty Special for 1942 was 7 inches (180 mm) longer and 1 inch (25 mm) lower than the 1941 model, and now riding an exclusive wheelbase of 133 inches (3,400 mm), longer than any other non-limousine Cadillac. It was a central characteristic of the Sixty Special. For 28 of the next 34 model years of its existence, the Sixty Special featured a uniquely stretched GM C-Body with greater legroom and headroom.

Through 1948, Cadillac advertised the Sixty Special as a five-passenger car. The new design was more streamlined and less upright in appearance versus its predecessor, featuring "pontoon" fenders front and rear; this was the year that the bumper "bullets" were introduced which would remain a Cadillac styling feature through 1958. The unique, separate bright metal window frames were dropped in favor of bright metal window surrounds on conventional style doors. The slow-selling Sunshine Roof (sun roof) option was discontinued at the end of the 1941 model year, and would not reappear in a Cadillac until the 1970 Eldorado. Rear compartment wood-grained door caps now blended into a fixed rear bulkhead just behind the front seat (on all vehicles with or without a glass partition), emphasizing front and rear compartment separation. While the model-specific interior was luxuriously outfitted, Cadillac largely depended on trim to differentiate the exterior of Sixty Special from the shorter but similarly styled Series 62 Touring Sedan. Decorative chrome louvers - which would become a Sixty Special trademark ornament for years to come - were mounted in three locations on the 1942 model: behind the wheel well openings on the front and rear fenders, as well as mounted on the roof behind the rear door opening. In addition to the louvered trim, the Sixty Special had a wider "C-pillar" than other models. Just two variants were now available in the Sixty Special series – the standard sedan priced at $2,435 and a $2,589 Imperial sedan which featured an electrically adjustable glass partition between the front and rear seats. Productions totals include 1,684 standard sedans and an additional 190 Imperial sedans. Because of World War II, Cadillac ended automobile production in February 1942 and began assembling military equipment.

The 1946 Sixty Special was now very similar to the C-body Series 62, though a mild wheelbase stretch added more room to the rear seat area. The 1946 model showed few changes from the 1942 model, including a mild grille redesign and new bumpers. Parking lamps and turn signals were now mounted below the headlights. This was the first year the "V" was used underneath the Cadillac crest (the last vehicle to use this emblem would be the 1984 DeVille). Only one model remained in the Sixty Special lineup – the $3,054 standard sedan. Both sets of fender-mounted chrome louvers were gone, but roof-mounted ones remained. Cadillac now used a negative-ground battery on a 6-volt system. Sixty Special would only reach 5,700 units for 1946, as it did not go into production until later in the model year. An electric clock was standard.

Few changes greeted Sixty Special for 1947, as an all-new design was coming in 1948. Cadillac's famed "sombrero" wheel covers – in bright stainless steel - debuted this year. Behind the redesigned grille was the same 346 cu in (5.67 L) engine that Cadillac had been using since 1936, now rated at 150 horsepower (110 kW). Bright metal stone shields – mounted on the forward edge of the rear fenders - replaced the black rubber pieces used on the 1946 model. The new grille was made up of five bars versus the previous six. Lastly, Cadillac script nameplates replaced the block letters used previously. Price was up to $3,195 – a pretty substantial jump from the 1942 price of $2,435 considering it was practically the same vehicle. Despite the steep price hike, production hit a new height at 8,500 units, but this represented only 14% of Cadillac's sales, down sharply from the 40% share they had represented in 1939. This was largely due to the tremendous sales success of the Series 62, whose low bodies with broad shoulder room and no running boards had been inspired by the original Sixty Special.

== 1948–1949 ==
Third generation
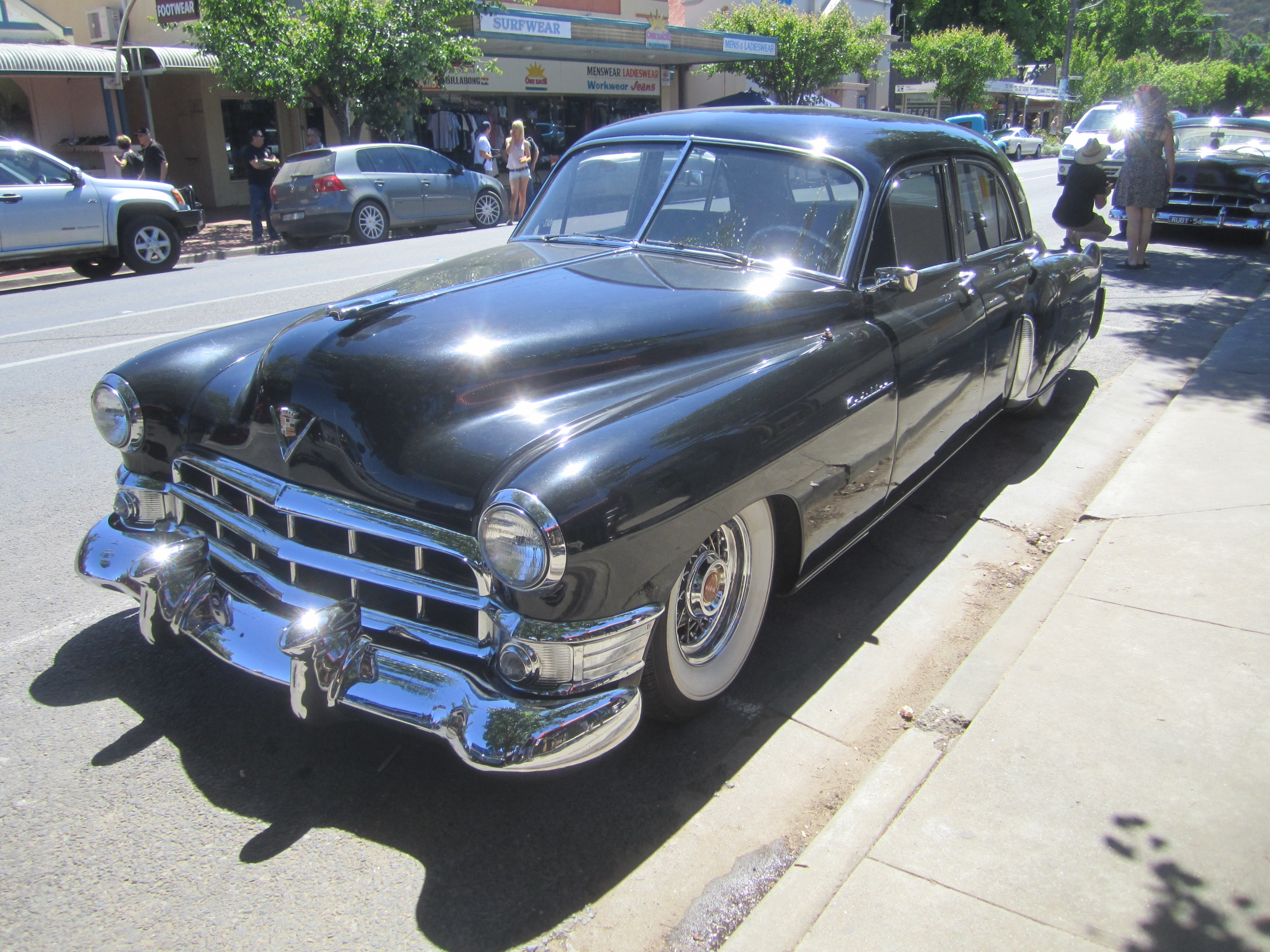
- 1949 Cadillac 60 Special

Overview
- Model years: 1948–1949
- Assembly: Detroit Assembly, Detroit, Michigan, U.S.
- Designer: Bill Mitchell

Body and chassis
- Body style: 4-door sedan
- Layout: FR layout
- Platform: C-body

Powertrain
- Engine: 346 cu in (5.7 L) Monobloc V8; 331 cu in (5.4 L) OHV V8
- Transmission: 3-speed selective synchromesh manual 4-speed Hydra-Matic automatic

Dimensions
- Wheelbase: 133.0 in (3,378 mm)
- Length: 226.0 in (5,740 mm)
- Width: 78.2 in (1,986 mm)
- Height: 62.7 in (1,593 mm)
- Curb weight: 4,300–4,500 lb (2,000–2,000 kg)

Nearly every model was redesigned for 1948, including the $3,820 Sixty Special. With all-new sheet metal, but still riding an exclusive 133-inch wheelbase, the luxurious Sixty Special weighed in at 4,370 pounds shipping weight (over 4,500 pounds curb weight). Inside, window lifts and a two-way adjustable bench seat with hydro-electric assist were standard equipment; the system utilized a central electrically driven pump that provided pressurized fluid to hydraulic cylinders attached to the seat and window regulators. A clever rainbow-shaped instrument cluster which put all the gauges directly above the steering column in front of the driver was used for 1948 only, while a new curved dashboard design added to passenger roominess. The roof-mounted decorative chrome louvers and individually framed side door glass (a Sixty Special design element since 1938) were carried over to this latest model as well. With trim inspired by the Lockheed P-38 Lightning, the new Sixty Special featured simulated side-scoops and curious tail-fins - resembling the P-38's vertical stabilizers.

1949 brought new power to Cadillac, in the form of the 331 cu in (5.42 L) OHV V8 engine. This new powerplant featured a short-stroke, high-compression design that provided both quiet, economical operation and smooth, high performance. Although the engine was smaller and shorter than its predecessor, it was 10 hp (7.5 kW) more powerful and 188 pounds lighter. With near-annual improvements, this engine was used through the 1955 model year. A new grille was in order for 1949 – this one wider and more substantial than the previous year; the bottom and middle horizontal members framing the bright trim surrounding the parking lights and wrapping around the front fenders. The unusual 1948 instrument panel was replaced by a simplified, more conventional but less exciting arrangement. With only a slight price increase, the $3,859 Sixty Special was now advertised as a six-passenger car, and sales reached a record 11,399 units. 1949 was the last year Sixty Special used a two-piece windshield with a vertical divider mounted in the center. Four Cadillacs were custom-made this year for the General Motors Automobile Show in New York. Three of them used the Sixty Special body – including a two-door pillar-less hardtop, the first "Coupe DeVille", built on a 133-inch Sixty Special wheelbase. The other two were specially outfitted and equipped standard Sixty Special sedans. The fourth car built for the show was a stock 1949 Cadillac Series 62 convertible – but with a custom western motif interior.

== 1950–1953 ==
Fourth generation
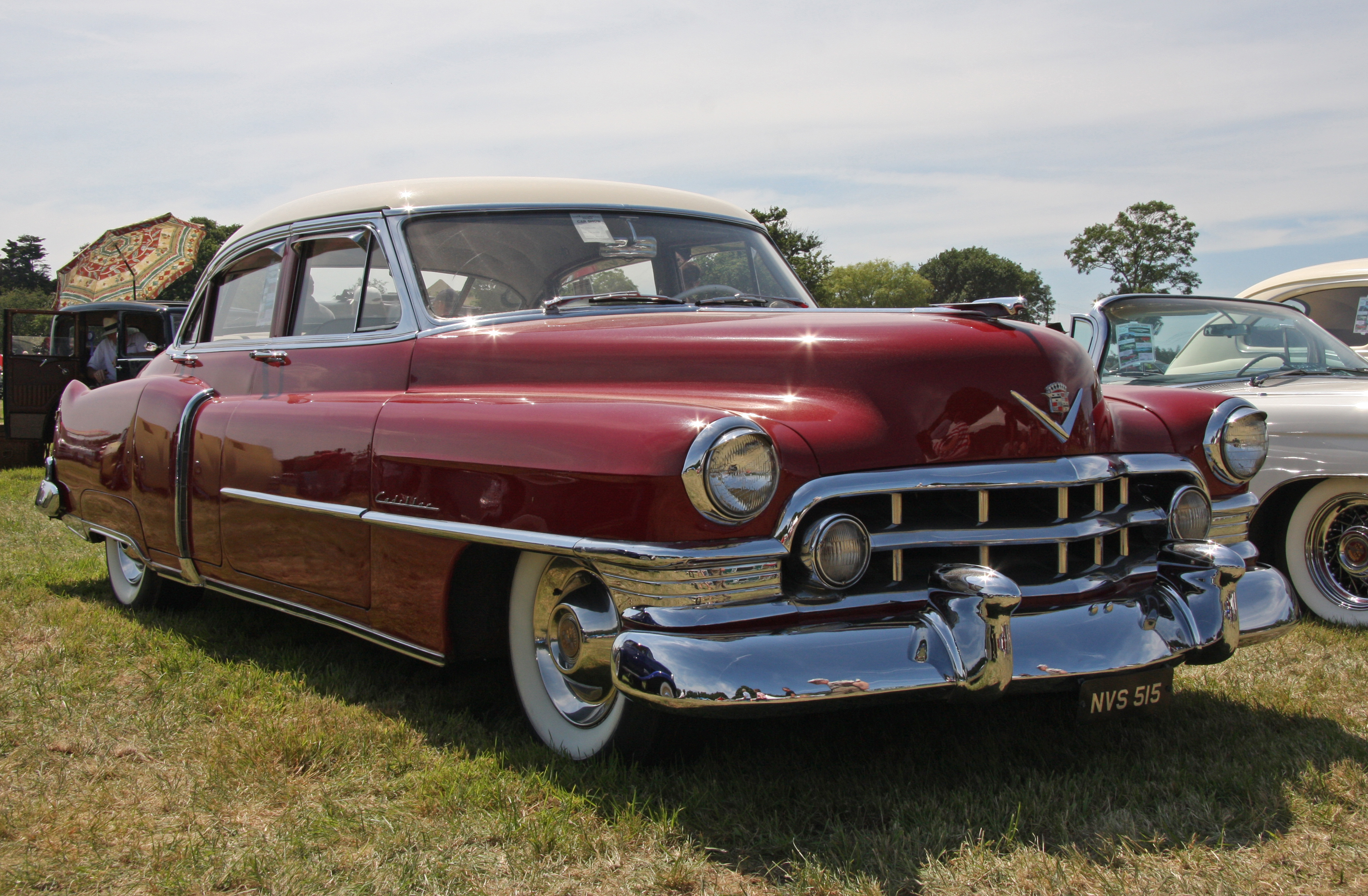

Overview
- Model years: 1950–1953
- Assembly: Detroit Assembly, Detroit, Michigan, U.S.
- Designer: Bill Mitchell

Body and chassis
- Body style: 4-door sedan
- Layout: FR layout
- Platform: C-body

Powertrain
- Engine: 331 cu in (5.4 L) OHV V8
- Transmission: 4-speed Hydra-Matic automatic

Dimensions
- Wheelbase: 130.0 in (3,302 mm)
- Length: 1950: 224.9 in (5,712 mm); 1951–52: 224.5 in (5,702 mm); 1953: 224.8 in (5,710 mm)
- Width: 80.1 in (2,035 mm)
- Height: 62.7 in (1,593 mm)
- Curb weight: 4,300–4,500 lb (2,000–2,000 kg)

Throughout the 1950s, the Sixty Special would continue as a stretched and optioned-up version of the Cadillac Series 62, but lost the manual transmission.

For 1950, Cadillac showed all-new styling on every car in the lineup, including the $3,797 Sixty Special. While the opulent interior rivaled no other Cadillac, the exterior styling was nearly identical to the less-expensive Series 62 models. The chrome louver trim that was mounted on the rear roof panel since 1942 was now moved to the lower rear doors, just forward of the rear wheel wells. Although Cadillac used a wheelbase 4 in (100 mm) longer than the Series 62, the 130 in (3,300 mm) wheelbase was down 3 in (76 mm) from the previous year. The 1950 Sixty Special's shipping weight was 4,136 lb (1,876 kg) in base form (over 4,300 lb (2,000 kg) curb weight), and was powered by the same engine introduced for 1949 - the 331 cu in (5.42 L) Cadillac OHV V8 producing 160 horsepower (120 kW). For the first time in their history, over 100,000 Cadillacs were sold this year, and 13,755 of them was the Sixty Special – a new record for that model. The actual 100,000th Cadillac that rolled off the assembly line was a 1950 Sixty Special.

1951 showed little change from 1950, apart from a new grille and bumper design, borrowing bumper bullets (or dagmars) from the 1951 GM Le Sabre show car. Inside, red warning "idiot" lamps replaced the gauges for secondary instruments like voltage and oil pressure. The same 331 cu in (5.42 L) engine, introduced in 1949, was upsized for the 1951 Cadillacs, but with minor revisions for the drivetrain. Despite a price jump to $4,060, the 4,155 lb (1,885 kg)-shipping-weight Sixty Special broke records for the second year in a row, as sales now hit 18,631.

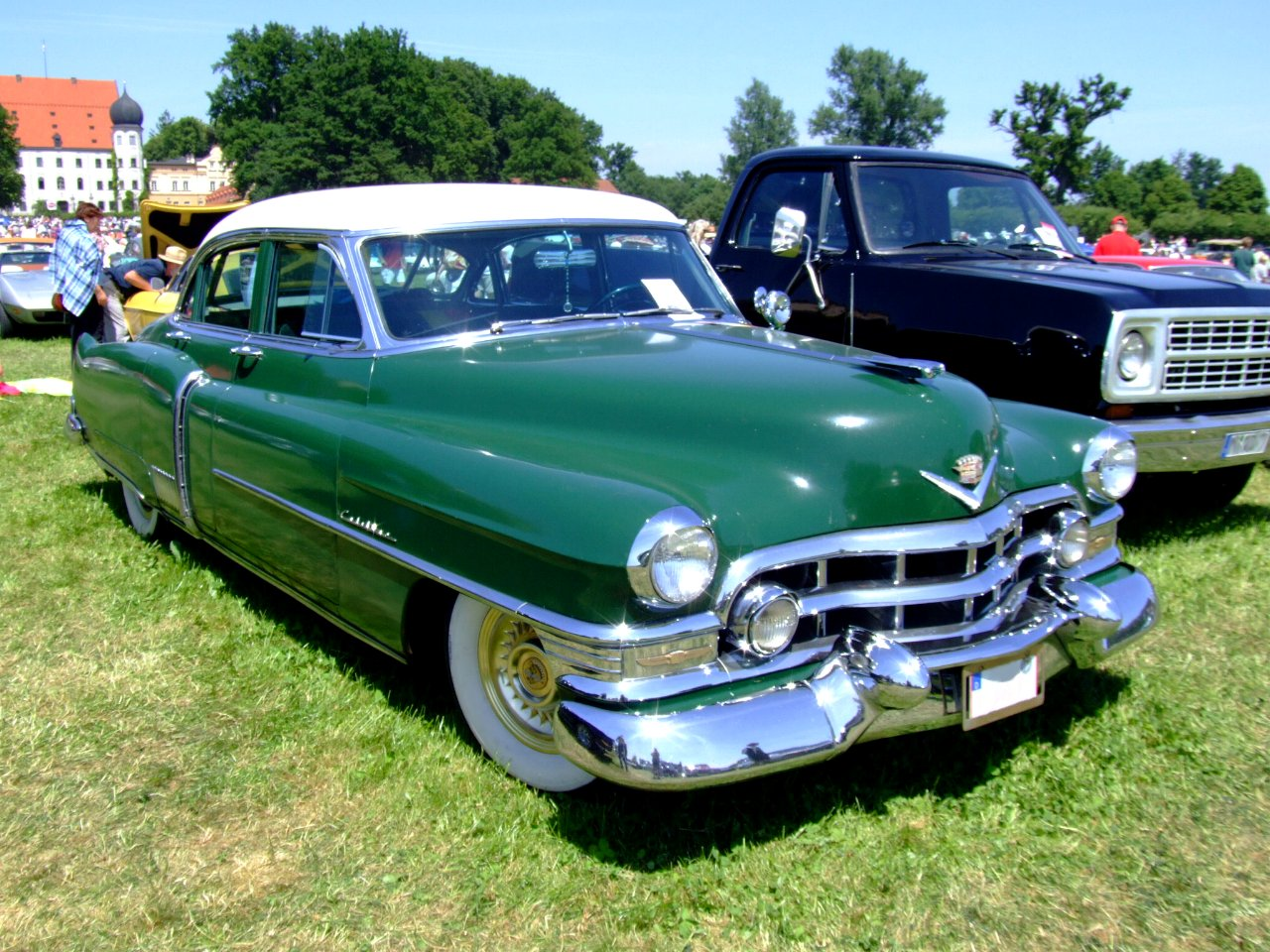
1952 Cadillac 60 Special

Cadillac celebrated its Golden Anniversary in 1952. Changes were minimal – and mostly in back where the reverse lamps were now integral with the fin-mounted tail lamps, and the "Fleetwood" script returned to the trunk lid. In addition, the rear exhaust outlets were now in the form of two wide horizontal slots on the outer edges of the rear bumper. Also new for 1952 were winged crest emblems, mounted on the grille extensions below the headlights. With the addition of a down-draft carburetor, the 331 cu in (5.42 L) engine now produced 190 horsepower (140 kW). A revised automatic transmission was standard on Sixty Special, while power steering was offered at extra cost. Sales fell to 16,110 units, while the price and weight both rose, to $4,269 and 4,258 lb (1,931 kg) shipping weight. Cadillac won Motor Trend's "Car of the Year" again in 1952.

Just more of the same for 1953 Sixty Special, as all the attention was towards the new Eldorado convertible. Minimal trim changes to the Sixty Special included wider rocker panel moldings, which moved the chrome louvers higher up on the rear doors, and a revised grille and bumper. However, significant engineering changes were made to the 1953 models, including a new 12-volt electrical system and a jump in power for the 331 cu in (5.42 L) engine – now rated at 210 hp (160 kW). Two new notable options debuted this year. First, the $619.55 trunk-mounted air conditioning unit – developed by Frigidaire – was available in all closed-body Cadillac models. Second, the dashboard-mounted "Autronic Eye" became available. This automated system, which automatically dimmed the high-beam headlights when a forward-facing sensor indicated oncoming traffic, would become a Cadillac option for nearly the next forty years. Also available – for $325 – was a set of five wire wheels, which hadn't been seen on factory Cadillacs since the 1930s. Wire wheels would occasionally continue to be optionally available through 1992. The minor changes for the 1953 Sixty Special worked wonders, as sales of the $4,304 car was now up to a record 20,000 copies. Weight was up to 4,415 lb (2,003 kg), and optional wire wheels would add an additional 30 lb (14 kg).

== 1954–1956 ==
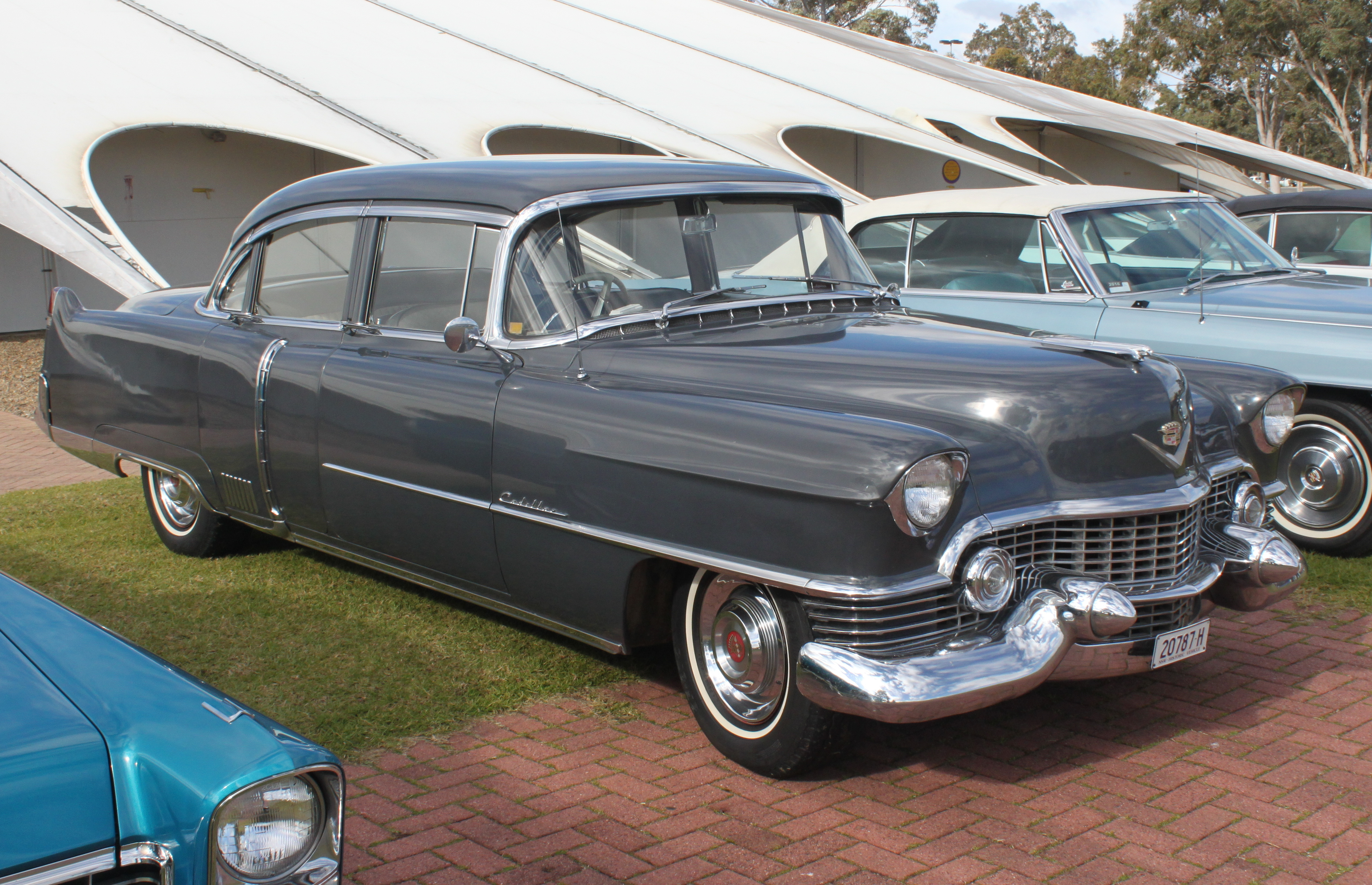
1954 Cadillac 60 Special

Fifth generation
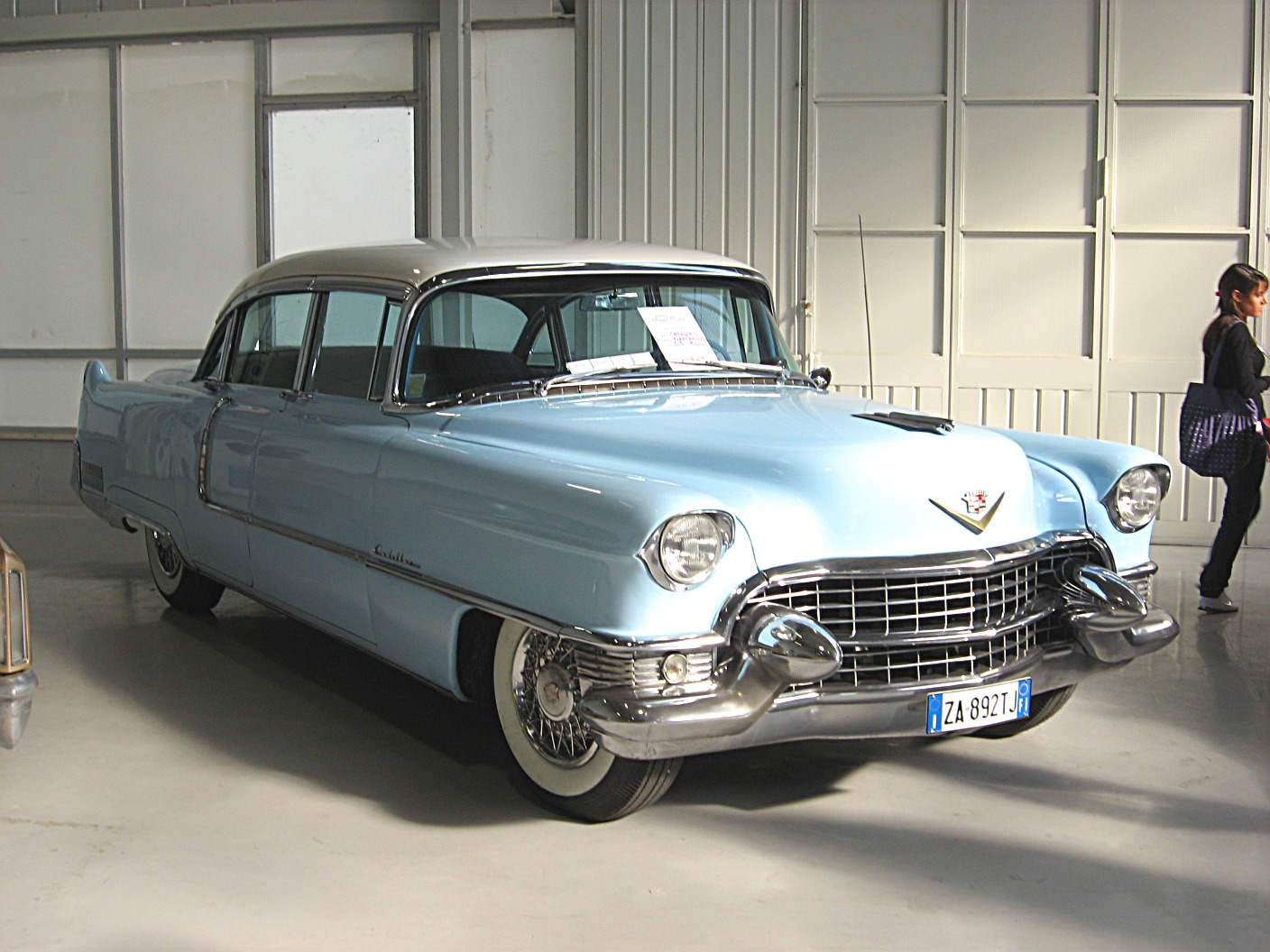
- 1955 Cadillac 60 Special

Overview
- Model years: 1954–1956
- Assembly: Detroit Assembly, Detroit, Michigan, U.S.
- Designer: Bill Mitchell

Body and chassis
- Body style: 4-door sedan
- Layout: FR layout
- Platform: C-body

Powertrain
- Engine: 331 cu in (5.4 L) OHV V8; 365 cu in (6.0 L) OHV V8
- Transmission: 4-speed Hydra-Matic automatic

Dimensions
- Wheelbase: 133.0 in (3,378 mm)
- Length: 1954: 227.4 in (5,776 mm); 1955: 227.3 in (5,773 mm); 1956: 225.9 in (5,738 mm)
- Width: 1954: 79.6 in (2,022 mm); 1955: 79.8 in (2,027 mm); 1956: 80.1 in (2,035 mm)
- Height: 1954–55: 62.1 in (1,577 mm); 1956: 62.0 in (1,575 mm)
- Curb weight: 4,700–5,000 lb (2,100–2,300 kg)

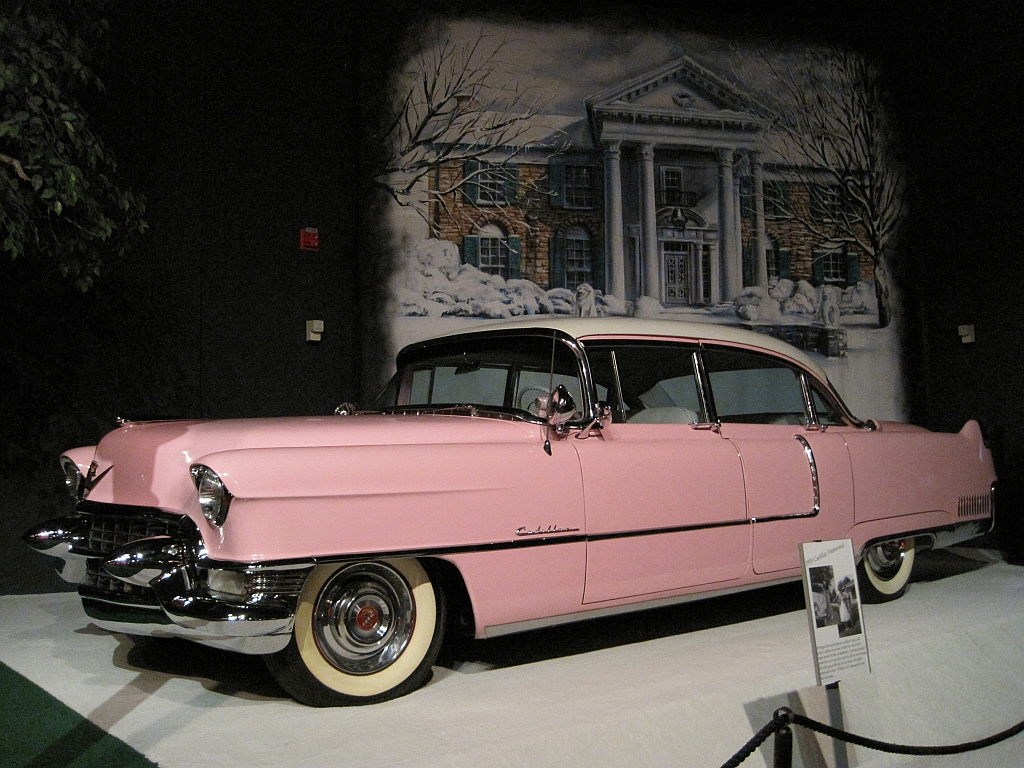
Elvis Presley's 1955 Cadillac 60 Special

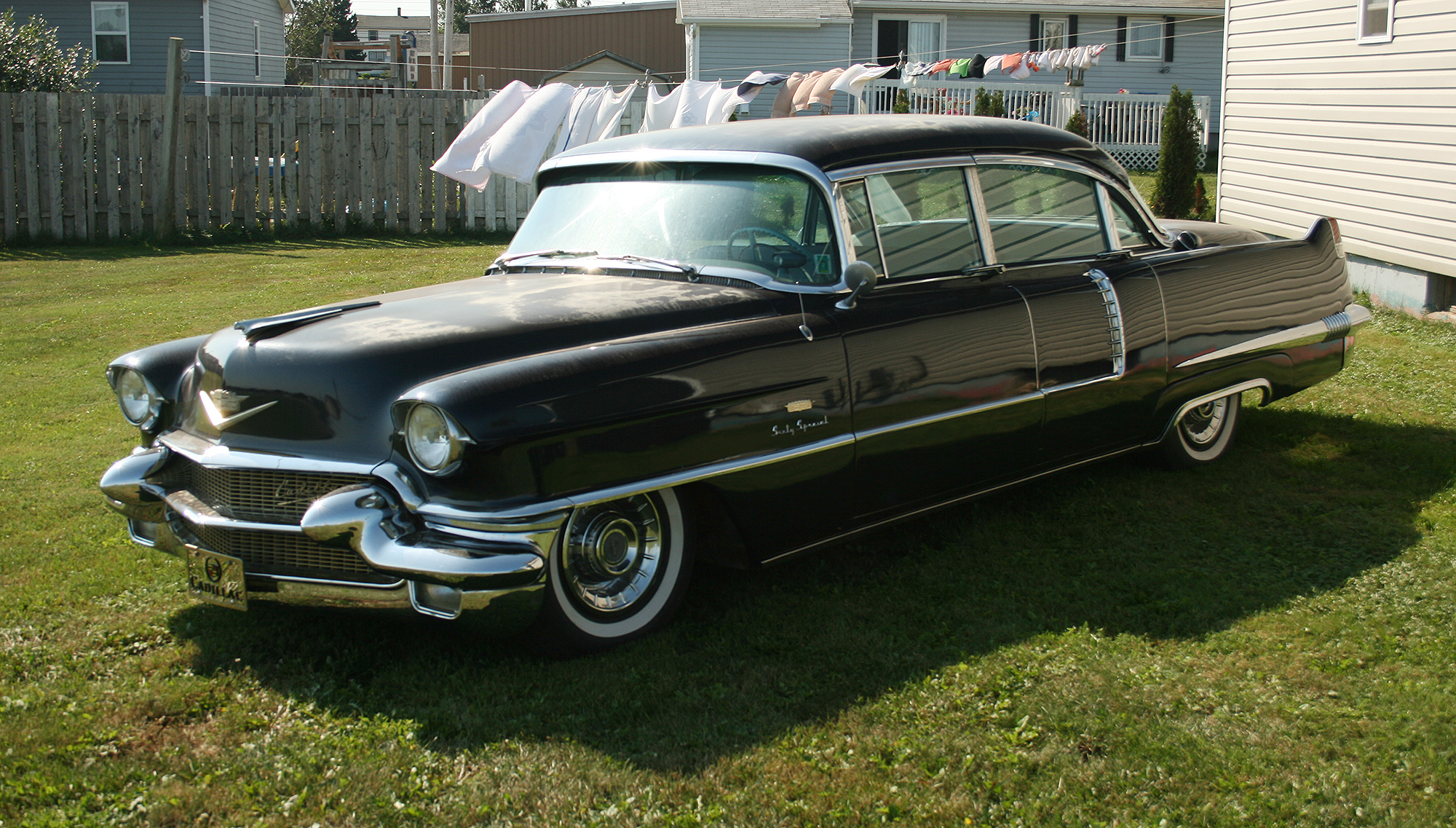
1956 Cadillac Sixty Special

All 1954 Cadillacs wore new sheet metal, but unfortunately the $4,683 Sixty Special still looked too much like its lower-priced sibling ($56,144 in 2025 dollars), the Series 62. Wheelbase for Sixty Special was back up to 133 in (3,400 mm) – where it had been in 1949. Refined power steering, from Saginaw, became standard equipment, along with electric windshield washers. New options included a four-way electrically power bench seat, and power brakes from Bendix. As they had been doing since its introduction in 1949, Cadillac was able to pull more power out of its 331 cu in (5.42 L) engine, and now it was rated at 230. The eight chrome trim louvers moved lower onto the rear doors, back where they were in 1952. Sales dropped to 16,200 this year – down from 20,000 in 1953.

Sixty Special arrived with revised trim and more power (250 hp (190 kW), to be exact) for 1955, and while the $4,342 price was lower than last year, production rose slightly to 18,300 units. The eight chrome louvers – mounted on the lower rear doors since 1950, were replaced by 12 louvers mounted just ahead of the bumper on the rear fenders. Chrome rocker panel moldings – taller than the ones used on Series 62s - stretched from the back of the rear wheel well to the rear bumper. A new grille held a bold eggcrate design, while the rear roof support fashioned a delicate Florentine curve – this design was also shared with the lower-rung Series 62. In back, six vertical chrome louvers were mounted on the panel below the trunk lid – three spaced on each side of the license plate mounting. The tinted band across the windshield header changed from green to gray this year. A new option, the remote control trunk release, debuted this year.

1956 was the last year for the knobby, P-38 inspired tail fins on the rear of most Cadillacs, including the $4,587 Sixty Special. While the Cadillac division broke records by surpassing 150,000 units, Sixty Special slipped to an even 17,000 this year. Revamped trim included Cadillac crests on the front fenders, and a new grille (with a finer eggcrate design from last year) bearing a Cadillac script emblem, mounted at an angle, on the driver's side. Sixty Special script appeared on the front fenders below the Cadillac crest for the first time in the series history. Rear fenders held a chrome bead running along the top, while massive chrome spears with hash marks replaced the 1955's delicate chrome louvers on the rear sides. This chrome side trim morphed into the oval exhaust ports in the redesigned rear bumper. An anodized gold grille was optionally available on Sixty Special, while power brakes became standard equipment. New for 1956 was a larger 365 cu in (5.98 L) powerplant producing 285 horsepower (213 kW) combined with a revamped automatic transmission. Sabre Spoke wheels - standard on Eldorado - became available for Sixty Special, while inside, passenger seatbelts appeared on the option list.

== 1957–1958 ==
Sixth generation
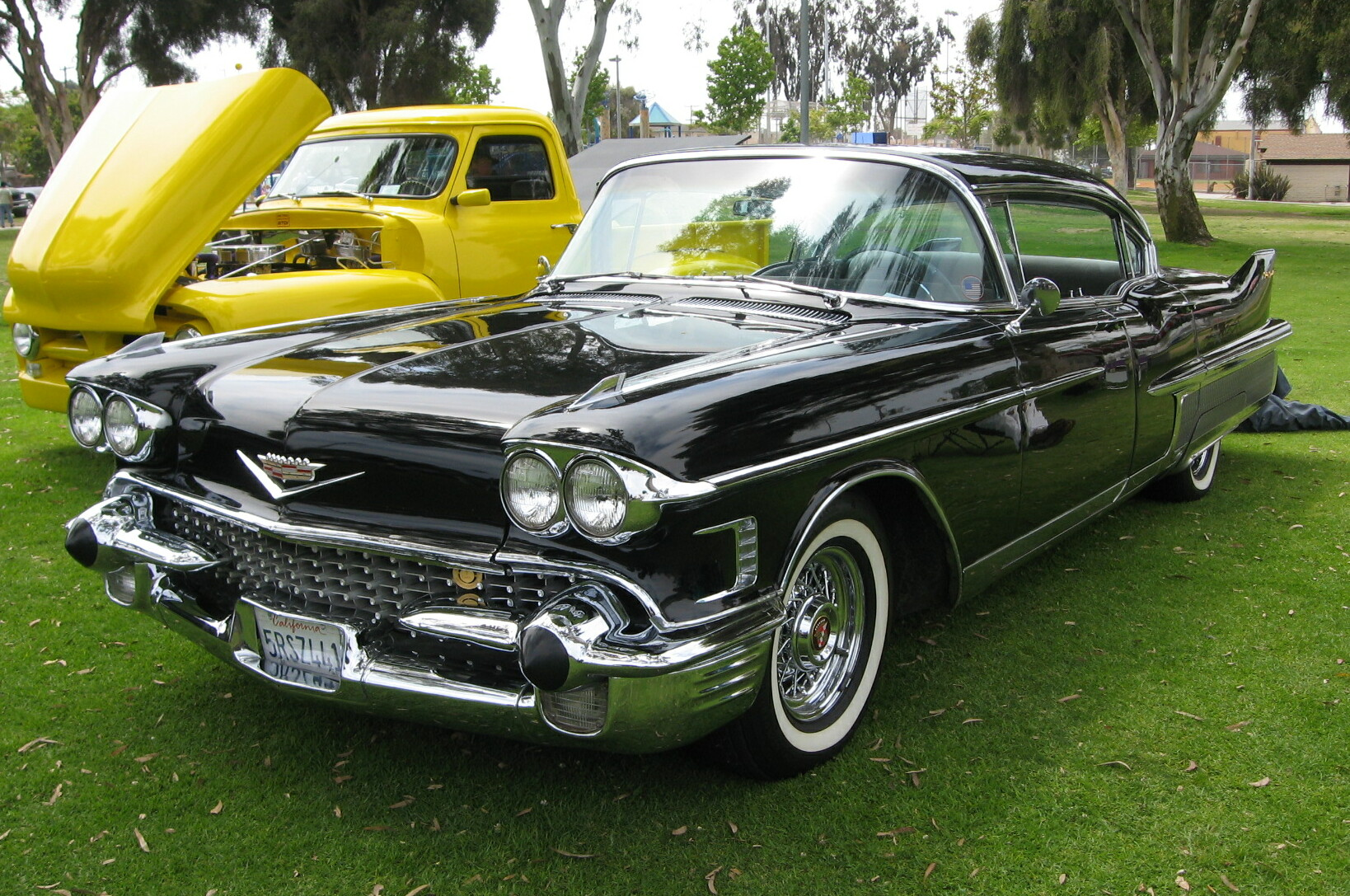

Overview
- Model years: 1957–1958
- Assembly: Detroit Assembly, Detroit, Michigan, U.S.
- Designer: Bill Mitchell

Body and chassis
- Body style: 4-door hardtop
- Layout: FR layout
- Platform: C-body

Powertrain
- Engine: 365 cu in (6.0 L) OHV V8
- Transmission: 4-speed Hydra-Matic automatic

Dimensions
- Wheelbase: 133.0 in (3,378 mm)
- Length: 1957: 224.4 in (5,700 mm); 1958: 225.3 in (5,723 mm)
- Width: 80.0 in (2,032 mm)
- Height: 59.1 in (1,501 mm)
- Curb weight: 4,900–5,100 lb (2,200–2,300 kg)

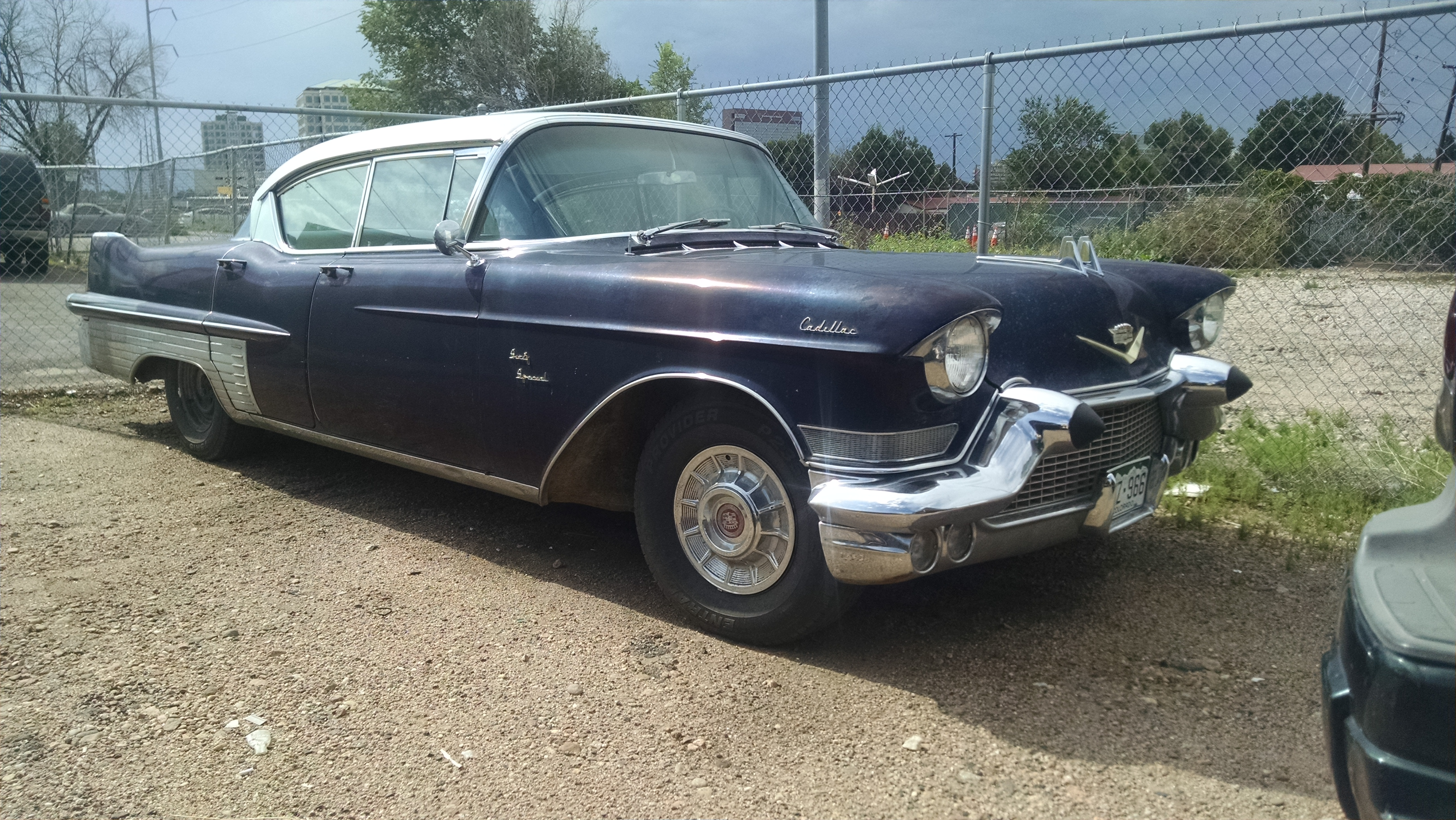
1957 Cadillac 60 Special

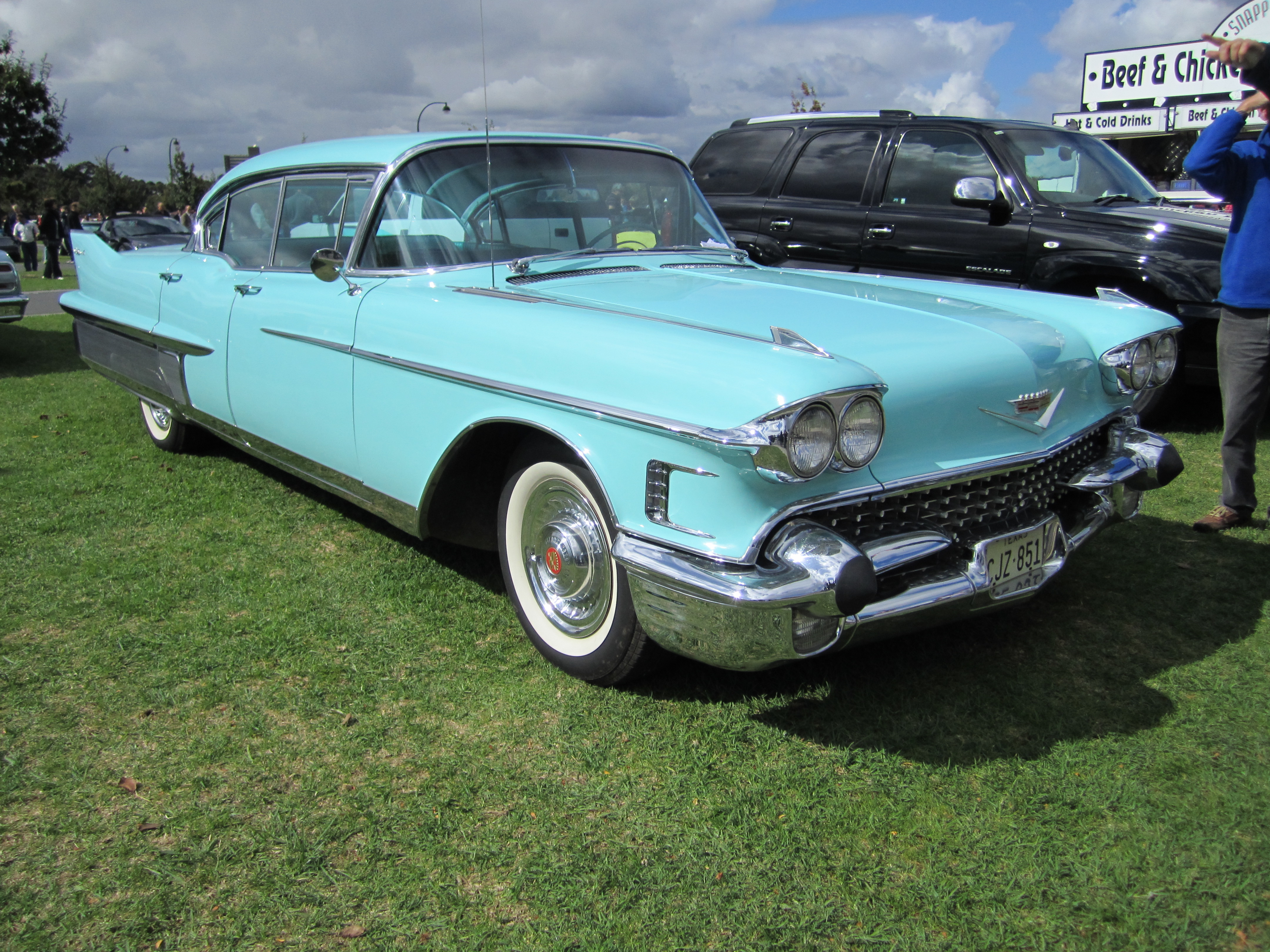
1958 Cadillac 60 Special

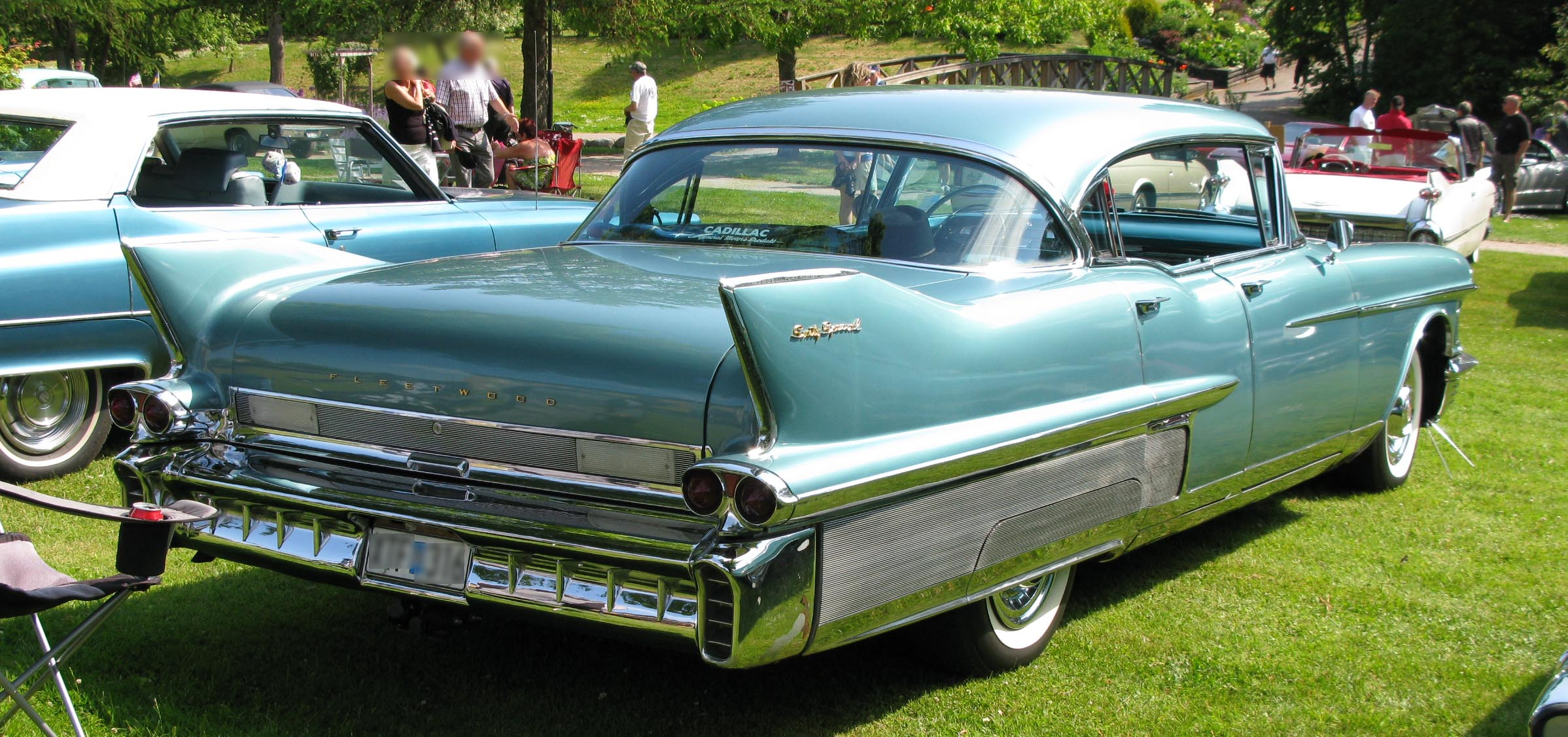
1958 Cadillac 60 Special rear

Cadillac introduced its first production four-door hardtop, the Sedan DeVille, in 1956. When Cadillac redesigned all of its standard models for 1957, the Sixty Special adopted the pillarless design as well. Priced at a hefty $5,539 ($63,495 in 2025 dollars), the 4,761 lb (2,160 kg) (shipping weight) Sixty Special production reached an impressive 24,000 units - a sales plateau that the nameplate would never achieve again. The chrome fender louvers, a Sixty Special trademark since 1942, were gone in favor of a giant ribbed metallic panel that occupied the entire lower half of the rear fender. The Sixty Special script was located to the top of the rear fin for 1958, and the word "Fleetwood" was spelled out in block lettering across the trunklid. Engineering treats included moving the optional air conditioning unit from the trunk to a space under the hood, and a foot-operated parking brake that released when the car was put in gear. The 365 cu in (5.98 L) engine introduced last year was now bumped up to 300 hp (220 kW). In spite of all-new sheet metal on the 1957 models, much of Cadillac's attention was focused on the new limited production Eldorado Brougham. This new four-door model did not pose a threat to Sixty Special production, since the new Brougham was a hand-built, limited-production specialty model with a stupendously steep $13,074 price tag ($149,871 in 2025 dollars) – more than double a new Sixty Special. Power windows and brakes were standard. A pre-selector radio was optional.

1958 saw extensive design changes, even though the cars were entirely revamped for 1957. Horsepower from the 365 cu in (5.98 L) engine was now at 310 hp (230 kW). Sparkling "studs" decorated the wide new grille, while the rubber-tipped bumper guards were moved further out towards the edges of the car – leaving a lower, wider look. Four headlights, a style that appeared on last year's Eldorado Brougham, were adopted for all Cadillacs, including the $6,117 Sixty Special. Full fender skirts practically hid the rear wheels from sight, and the massive ribbed stainless steel trim occupied the lower half of the rear fender. Small vent windows were added to Sixty Special's rear doors, and newly available power door locks were optional. This marked the last year that the Sixty Special would maintain a stretched GM C-Body until its return in the 1965 model year. The model year 1958 would also be the last that the Sixty Special script would actually appear anywhere on the car. Sales for the 4,930 pound (shipping weight) car slid to 12,900 units – nearly half of last year's production.

== 1959–1960 ==
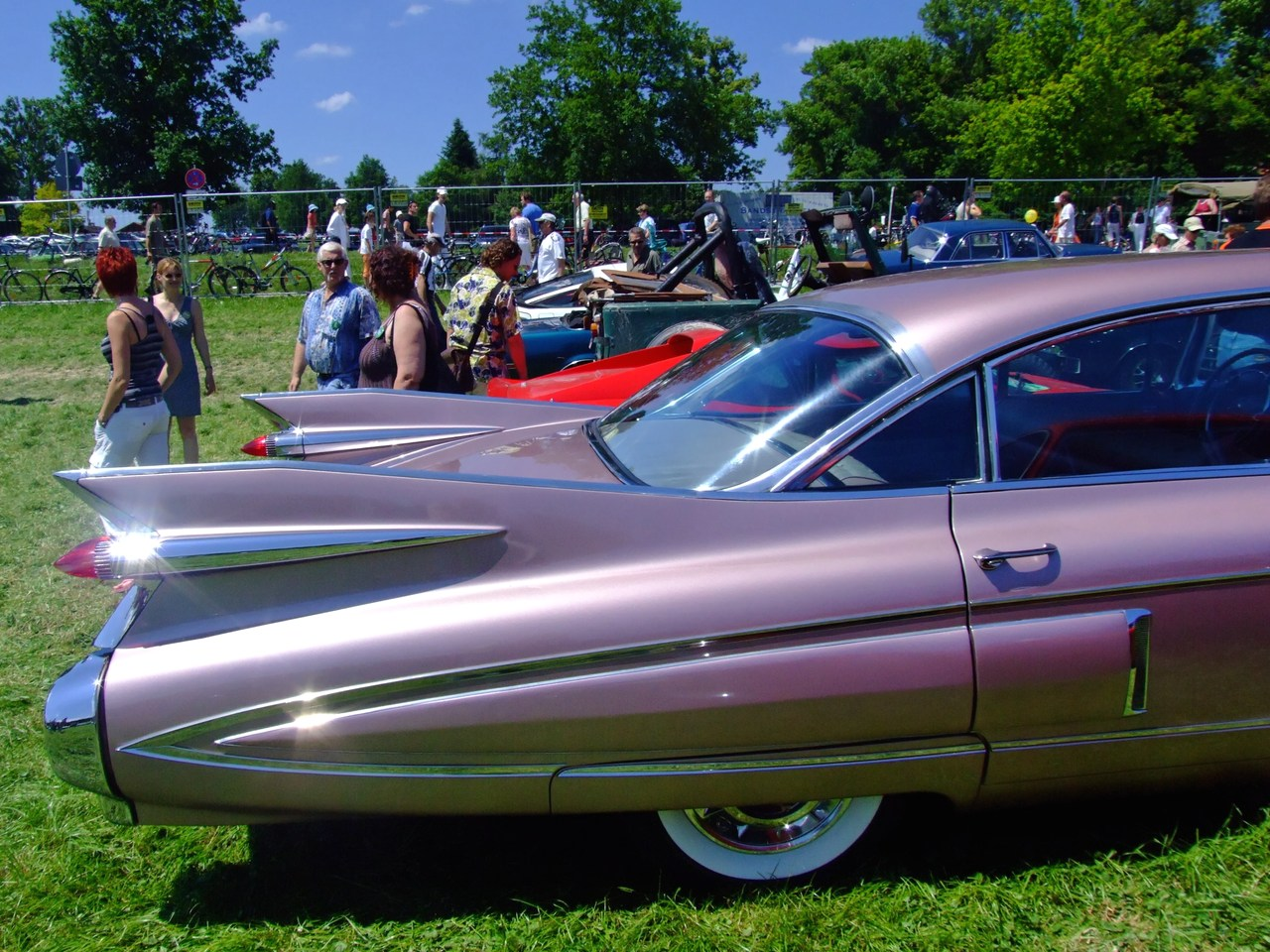
1959 Cadillac 60 Special with view of one year only (fake) air scoop

Seventh generation
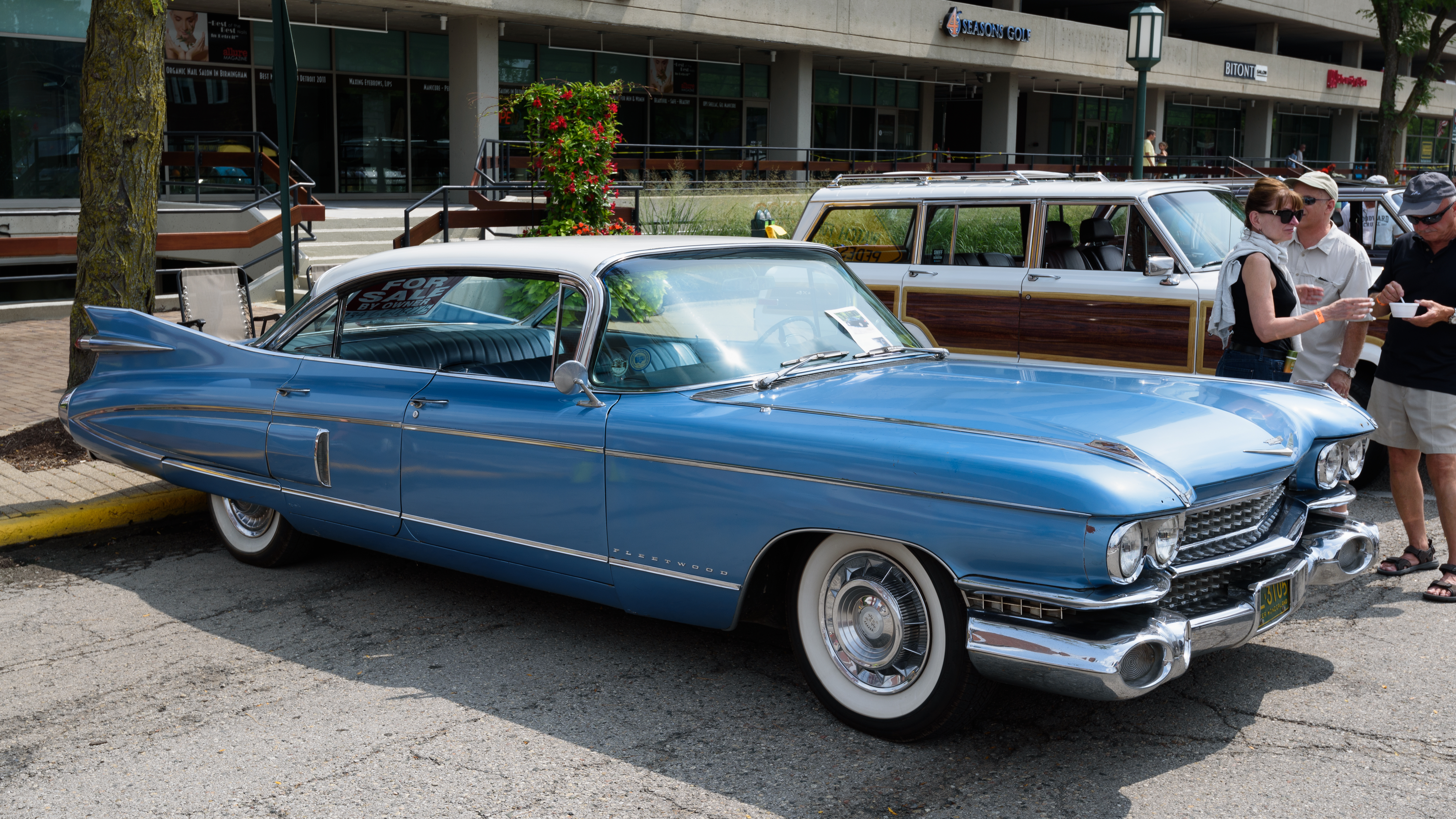

Overview
- Model years: 1959–1960
- Assembly: Detroit Assembly, Detroit, Michigan, U.S.
- Designer: Bill Mitchell

Body and chassis
- Body style: 4-door hardtop
- Layout: FR layout
- Platform: C-body
- Related: Cadillac DeVille; Cadillac Eldorado; Cadillac Series 62; Buick Electra; Oldsmobile 98

Powertrain
- Engine: 390 cu in (6.4 L) OHV V8
- Transmission: 4-speed Hydra-Matic automatic

Dimensions
- Wheelbase: 130.0 in (3,302 mm)
- Length: 225.0 in (5,715 mm)
- Width: 1959: 81.1 in (2,060 mm); 1960: 79.9 in (2,029 mm)
- Height: 56.2 in (1,427 mm)
- Curb weight: 5,100 lb (2,300 kg)

In 1959, the memorable fins appeared on nearly all Cadillacs this year, including the Sixty Special. Now riding a 3 in (76 mm)-shorter wheelbase (130 in (3,300 mm)), the 225 in (5,700 mm)-long Sixty Special continued as a pillarless hardtop with its own distinct moldings - including a side-mounted dummy air-scoop on the rear fender, and a thin chrome bead that ran from the front fender back to the rear bumper, and then forward again to the front wheel well. The fin-mounted tail lights pods (which were body-colored on lesser Cadillacs) were chromed. The 390 cu in (6.4 L) engine provided 325 horsepower (242 kW). Air suspension, utilizing freon-filled shock absorbers, was optional on Sixty Special. Cadillac also advertised a new "Scientifically engineered" drainage system.

Although the Sixty Special script was gone, the Fleetwood script remained, and since the only other Cadillac bodied by Fleetwood was the Series 75, for this and many other reasons, there was no confusing the Sixty Special with other Cadillacs. However a front fender-mounted cloisonne "Sixty Special" emblem would appear the following year and last through 1962.

1960 saw new (shorter) rear fins, and a cleaner side-trim design, as well as a rear "grille" design shared with Eldorado. The Sixty Special was also distinguished by a new front fender-mounted cloisonne "Sixty Special" emblem. Wheelbase remained 130 in (3,300 mm), and the $6,233 price was the same as the 1959. New for 1960 was a standard vinyl roof covering, and the small chrome "louvers" returned (first seen in 1942, last seen in 1956) mounted on the rear fenders, just ahead of the tail lights. Power steering and brakes were standard.

== 1961–1964 ==
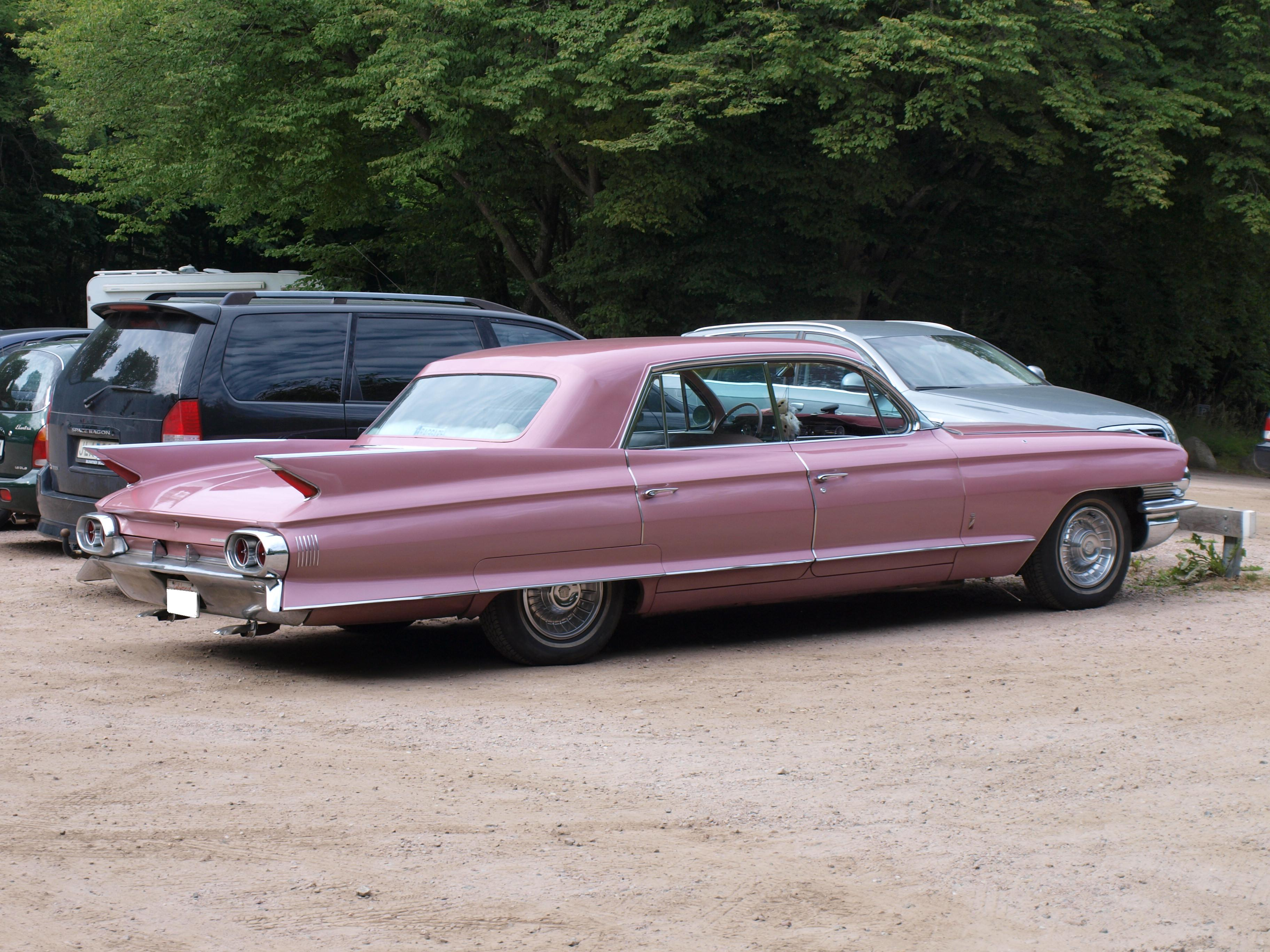
1961 Cadillac 60 Special

Eighth generation
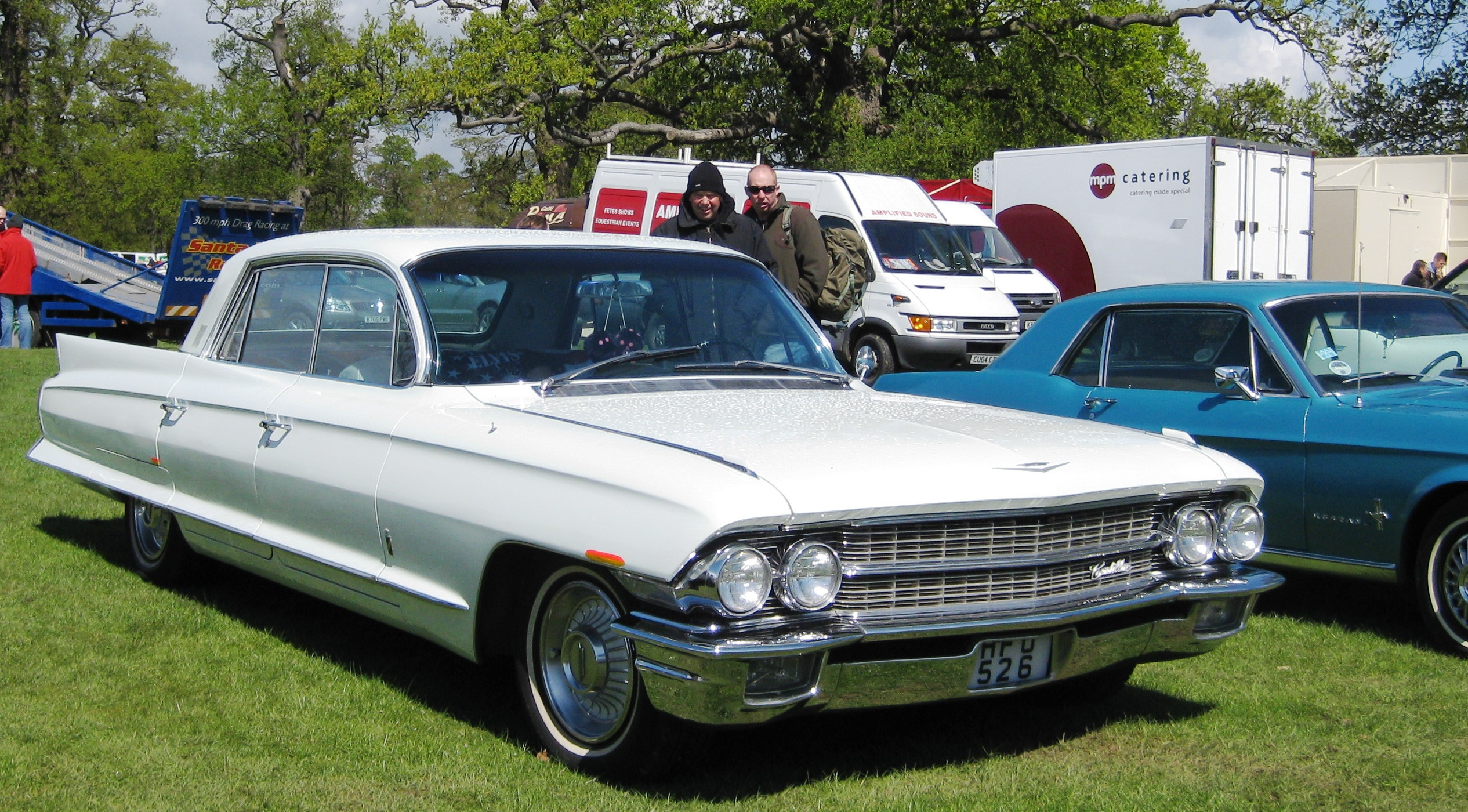

Overview
- Model years: 1961–1964
- Assembly: Detroit Assembly, Detroit, Michigan, U.S.
- Designer: Bill Mitchell

Body and chassis
- Body style: 4-door hardtop
- Layout: FR layout
- Platform: C-body
- Related: Cadillac DeVille; Cadillac Eldorado; Cadillac Series 62; Buick Electra; Oldsmobile 98

Powertrain
- Engine: 390 cu in (6.4 L) OHV V8; 429 cu in (7.0 L) OHV V8
- Transmission: 4-speed Hydra-Matic automatic 3-speed TH-400, automatic

Dimensions
- Wheelbase: 129.5 in (3,289 mm)
- Length: 1961–62: 222.0 in (5,639 mm); 1963: 223.0 in (5,664 mm); 1964: 223.5 in (5,677 mm)
- Width: 1961: 79.8 in (2,027 mm); 1962: 79.9 in (2,029 mm); 1963: 79.7 in (2,024 mm); 1964: 79.5 in (2,019 mm)
- Height: 1961–62: 56.3 in (1,430 mm); 1963–64: 56.6 in (1,438 mm)
- Curb weight: 4,900 lb (2,200 kg)

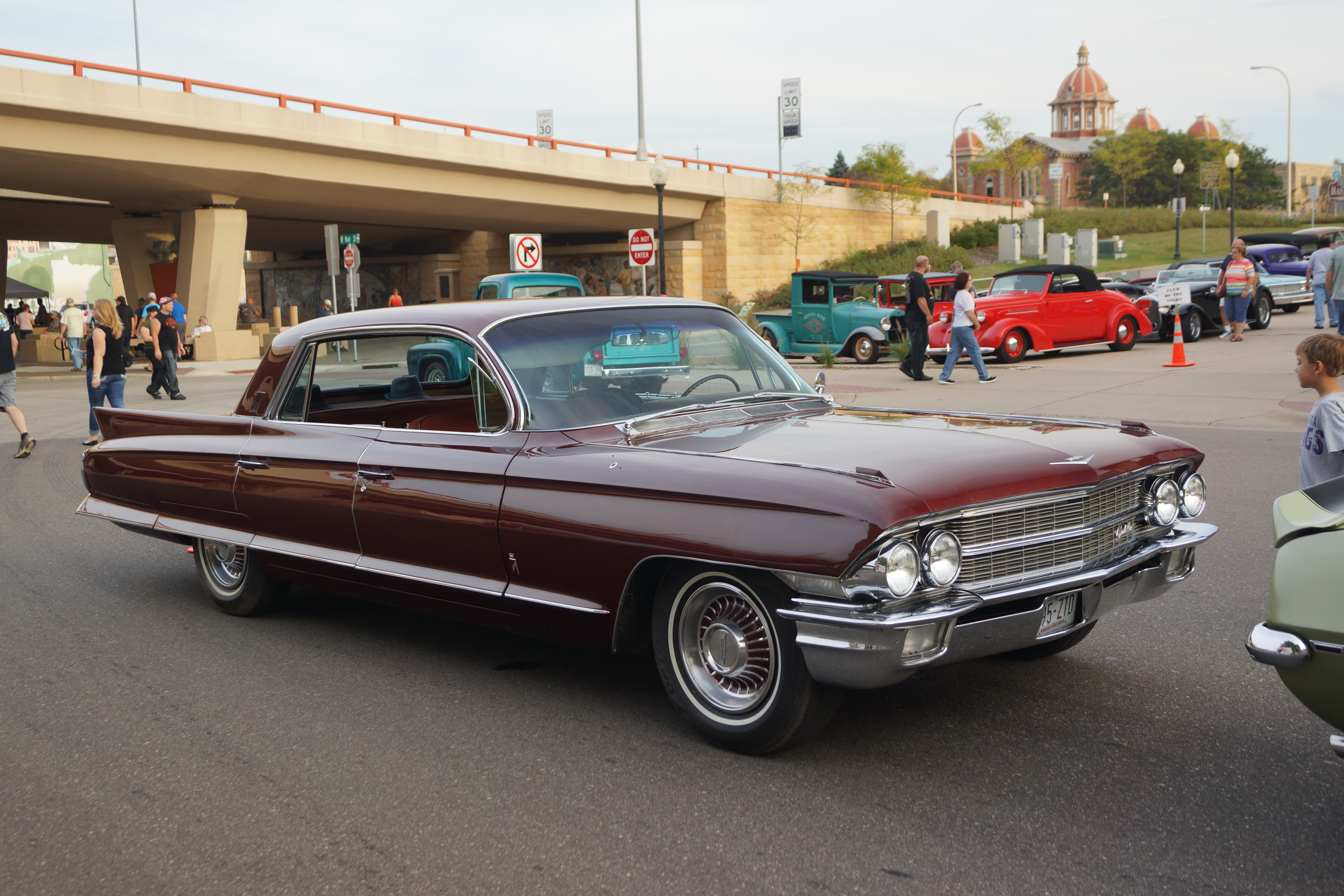
1962 Cadillac 60 Special

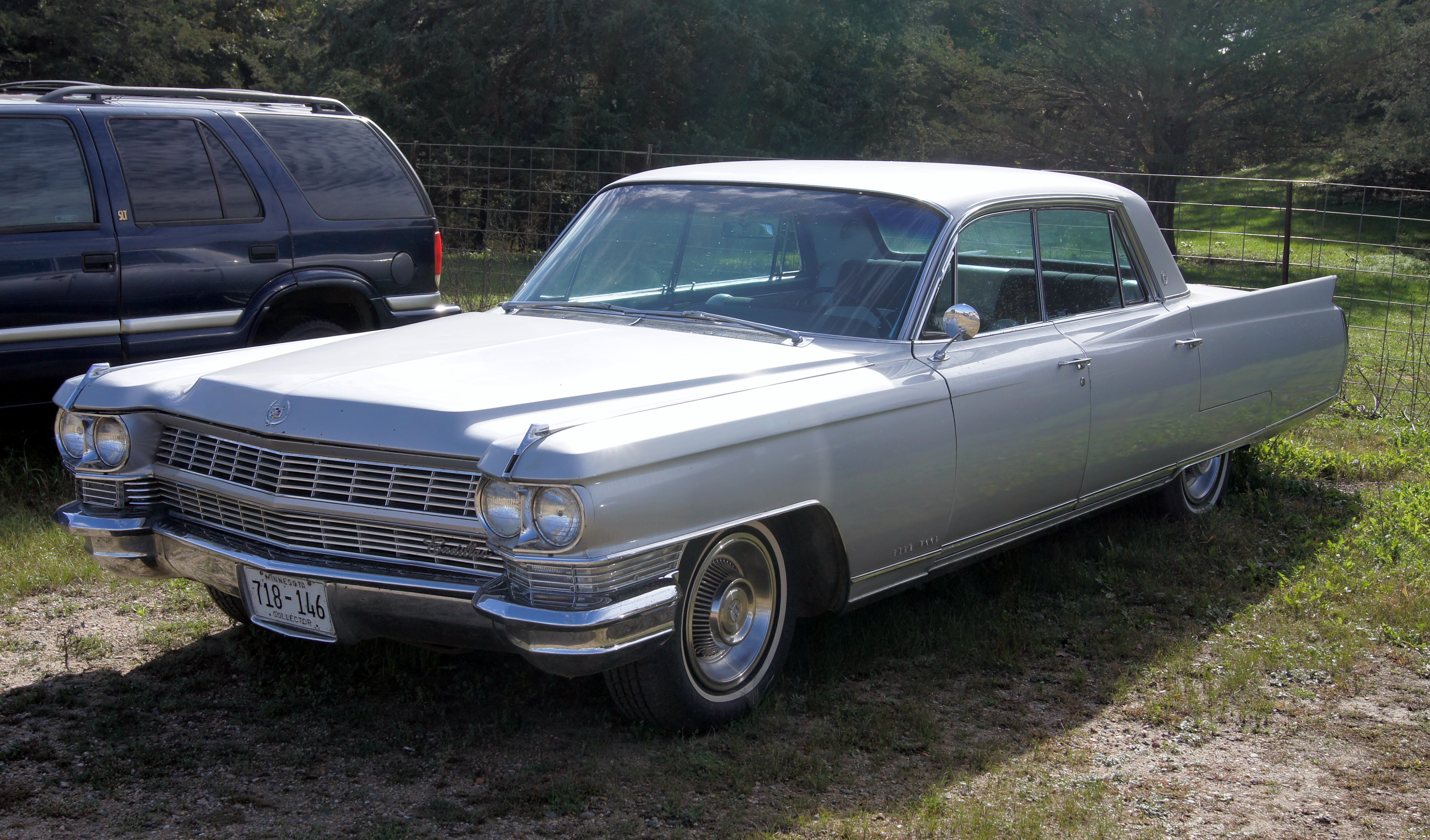
1964 Cadillac 60 Special

For 1961, Cadillac's Sixty Special received all-new sheet metal, with a crisp, limousine-like formal roofline and a mildly shorter 129.5 in (3,290 mm) wheelbase. The small decorative louvers were back, this time just ahead of the tail lights. Sales were up to 15,500 units. With the cancellation of the four-door Eldorado Brougham at the end of 1960, the 1961 Sixty Special now became the sedan companion to the Eldorado convertible. Power steering was standard.

1962's styling remained similar to 1961, and Sixty Special's fender louvers were moved up to the roof, directly behind the rear door opening. A revised grille up front, and a new trim panel below the rear deck lid rounded out the subtle changes. Sales slipped to 13,350 this year at a base price of $6,366. A power trunk lid pull down feature was an option. The heater was now standard.

1963 had all-new styling (on the same 129.5 in (3,289 mm) wheelbase), with a new mechanically streamlined 390 cu. in. engine producing the same 325 hp (242 kW) of the previous generation of OHV Cadillac V8. Sixty Special shared its lack of body-side trim with Eldorado - appearing very clean and formal compared to standard Cadillac models. While the small decorative louvers continued on the C-pillar, a new Cadillac "wreath and crest" ornament was on the rear fender. The front fender-mounted "Sixty Special" emblem (which appeared for 1960) was gone. The formerly standard vinyl top had now become a $125 option on Sixty-Special. Price was down to $6,300, and sales were up slightly 14,000.

Other than a slightly revamped grille and rear bumper, 1964 Sixty Special saw few exterior changes. The Cadillac wreath and crest ornament was moved to take the place of the C-pillar mounted louvers. The Sixty Special (and companion Eldorado convertible) featured almost no side trim, except for a wide rocker-sill molding which ran from the rear-edge of the front fender wheel well to the rear of the car. Engine displacement was enlarged to 429 cu in (7.03 L), and the venerable Hydra-Matic transmission, first introduced in the 1940 model year, was replaced with the new Turbo-Hydromatic automatic transmission. The cost was back up to the 1962 price of $6,366, and sales were up to 14,500 units.

== 1965–1970 ==
Ninth generation
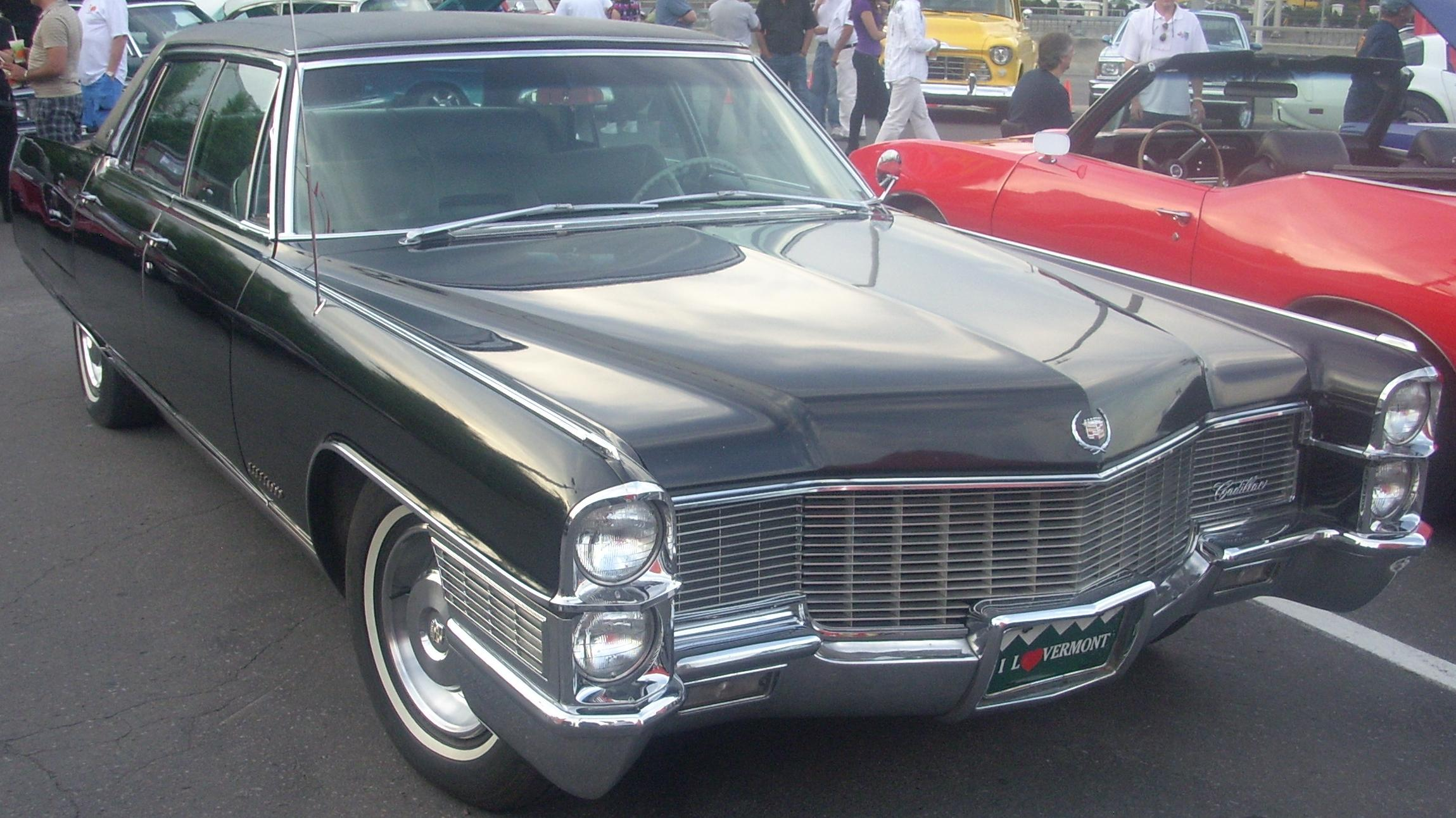

Overview
- Model years: 1965–1970
- Assembly: Detroit Assembly, Detroit, Michigan, U.S.
- Designer: Bill Mitchell

Body and chassis
- Body style: 4-door sedan
- Layout: FR layout
- Platform: C-body
- Related: Cadillac Calais; Cadillac DeVille; Cadillac Eldorado; Buick Electra; Oldsmobile 98

Powertrain
- Engine: 429 cu in (7.0 L) OHV V8; 472 cu in (7.7 L) OHV V8
- Transmission: 3-speed TH-400, automatic

Dimensions
- Wheelbase: 133.0 in (3,378 mm)
- Length: 1965–67: 227.5 in (5,778 mm); 1968: 228.2 in (5,796 mm); 1969–70: 228.5 in (5,804 mm)
- Width: 1965–68: 79.9 in (2,029 mm); 1969–70: 79.8 in (2,027 mm)
- Height: 1965–68: 56.6 in (1,438 mm); 1969–70: 56.8 in (1,443 mm)
- Curb weight: 4,800–5,000 lb (2,200–2,300 kg)

1965 featured all-new styling on a longer 133 in (3,378 mm) wheelbase, on a stretched GM C-body platform. The Sixty Special was now back to being a pillared sedan (the B-pillar had been absent since 1957). Also new for 1965 was the available "Brougham" option package, adding $194 to Sixty Special's base price of $6,479, which included padded grained-vinyl roof covering with "Brougham" badging on the C-pillar. 18,100 Sixty Specials were built for 1965. With Eldorado having joined the Sixty Special in 1963 as the only other non-limousine Cadillac bodied by Fleetwood, the addition of the Brougham script made things a little more consistent in nomenclature, for the Eldorado was originally only available as a convertible, and its later four-door sedan companion was denoted "Brougham". Also, Cadillac got rid of the X-frame and replaced it with a full-perimeter frame. Standard equipment now included a warning lamp in the instrument cluster indicating an unlatched trunk lid. Rear seat belts were also standard.

With minor trim changes, in 1966 Cadillac offered buyers two models in this series: the standard Fleetwood Sixty Special (priced at $6,378) and the new Fleetwood Brougham ($6,695). The Brougham option package proved so popular the previous year it was made a separate model for 1966. The Fleetwood Brougham included a formal-looking vinyl roof covering, and luxurious appointments inside such as genuine walnut trim and, for rear seat passengers, lighted writing tables (through 1967), foot rests, and reading lamps. This was the last year that the Sixty Special would serve as a body-sharing companion to the Eldorado convertible, as the 1967 Eldorado moved to front-wheel drive and all-new sheet metal. The new Sixty Special Brougham sold over 13,630 copies, surpassing the standard Sixty Special which sold only 5,445.

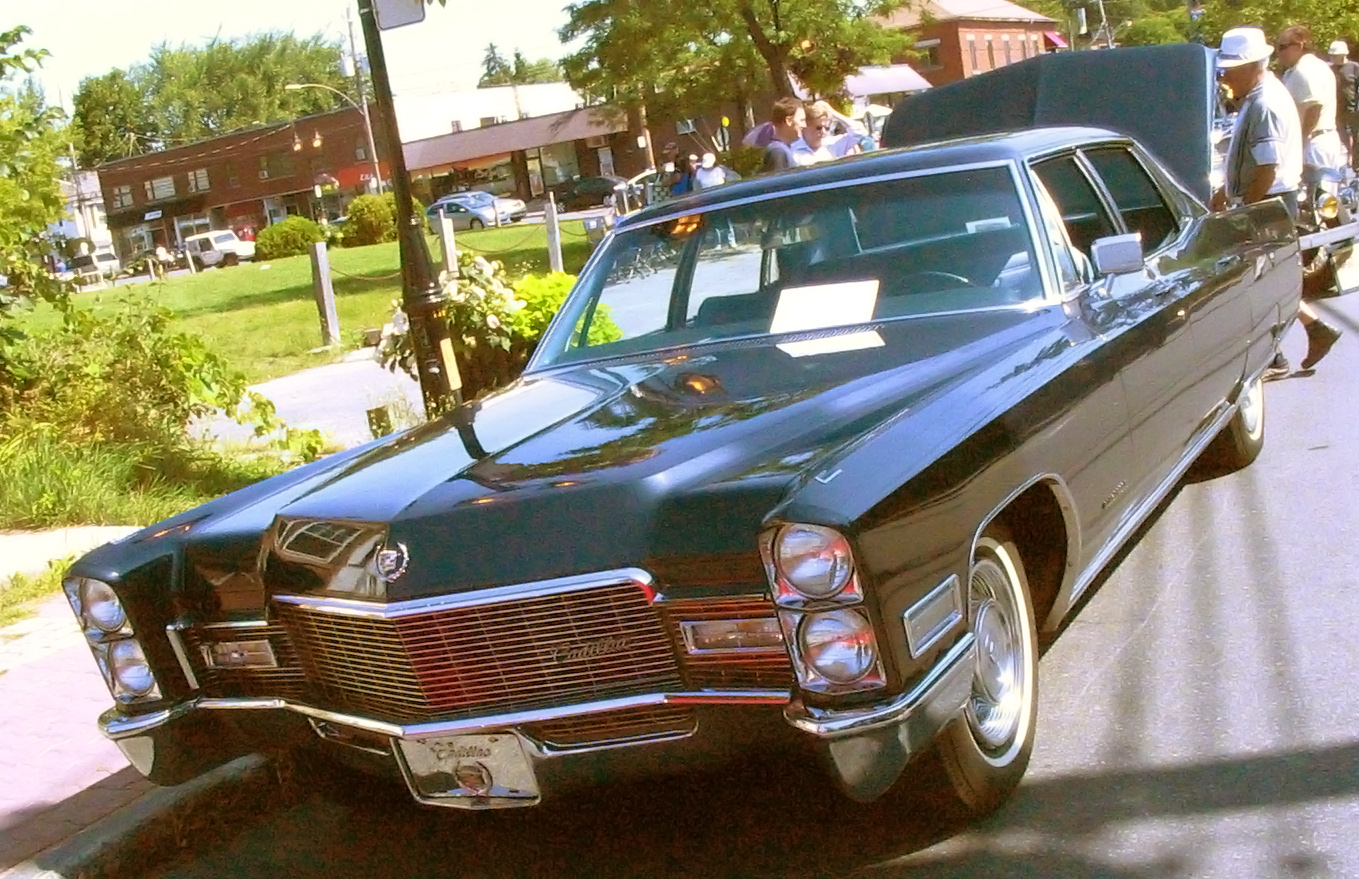
1968 Cadillac 60 Special

Cadillacs had all-new styling in 1967, but the Sixty-Special continued with an exclusive 133 in (3,400 mm) wheelbase. The $6,739 Sixty Special Brougham continued to outsell the $6,423 Sixty Special - 12,750 units versus 3,550. AM/FM radio was a $188 option.

1968 featured mostly carry-over styling from 1967, but the hood was longer this year, as it extended all the way to the base of the windshield to cover the "hidden" windshield wipers. Also new for 1968 was a stylish beveled deck lid. The $6,867 vinyl-roofed Sixty Special Brougham sold 15,300 models this year, while the standard Sixty Special with its painted metal roof (priced at $6,552) sold just 3,300 cars. Most Cadillac buyers clearly considered the $315 price difference insignificant.

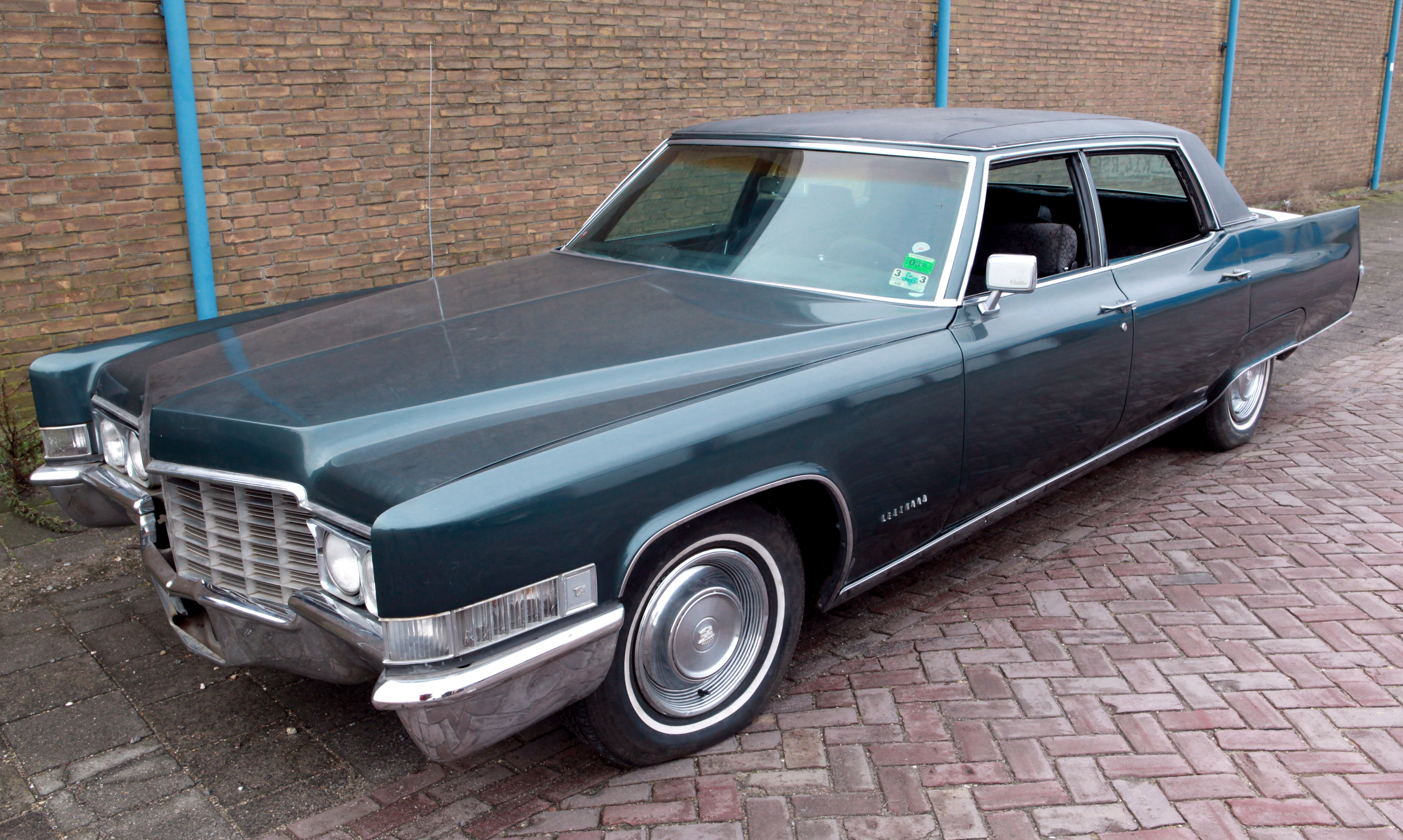
1969 Cadillac 60 Special Brougham

All-new styling appeared in 1969, and the two Sixty Special models had distinct rooflines from the other Cadillacs. A 60/40 split bench seat was standard in the Sixty Special Brougham, optional in Sixty Special. Safety was a new priority at Cadillac, which introduced a new steering column that not only was designed to absorb impact and collapse in a collision, but also had new Federally-mandated theft-deterrent features such as an ignition key switch activated steering wheel and transmission shifter lock mechanism. As also mandated, head rests were standard on front seats, while seat belts were provided for all six passengers. The 375 hp (280 kW) 472 cu in (7.73 L) engine carried over from 1968. Also of note this year was the disappearance of the small vent windows on the front and rear doors. Sixty Special Brougham, at $7,092, included a vinyl roof top (available in six colors), as well as rear-seat foot rests and an automatic level control for the rear wheels which kept the car level despite the weight of fuel, passengers, or cargo. Sixty Special Brougham's sales of 17,300 units easily surpassed the 2,545 copies of the standard $6,761 Sixty Special.

The 1970 Sixty Special received few changes, aside from the usual new grille and tail lamps. Sixty Special had long been recognized for its bold, bare side body, but this year the models received a 'chrome with vinyl insert' body-side molding – the model's first prominent side molding since the 'rocket-ship' 1958. Sales were 16,913 units of the Sixty Special Brougham at $7,284; and just 1,738 M Sixty-Specials at $6,953. This would be the last year for the standard, metal-roofed Sixty Special.

== 1971–1976 ==
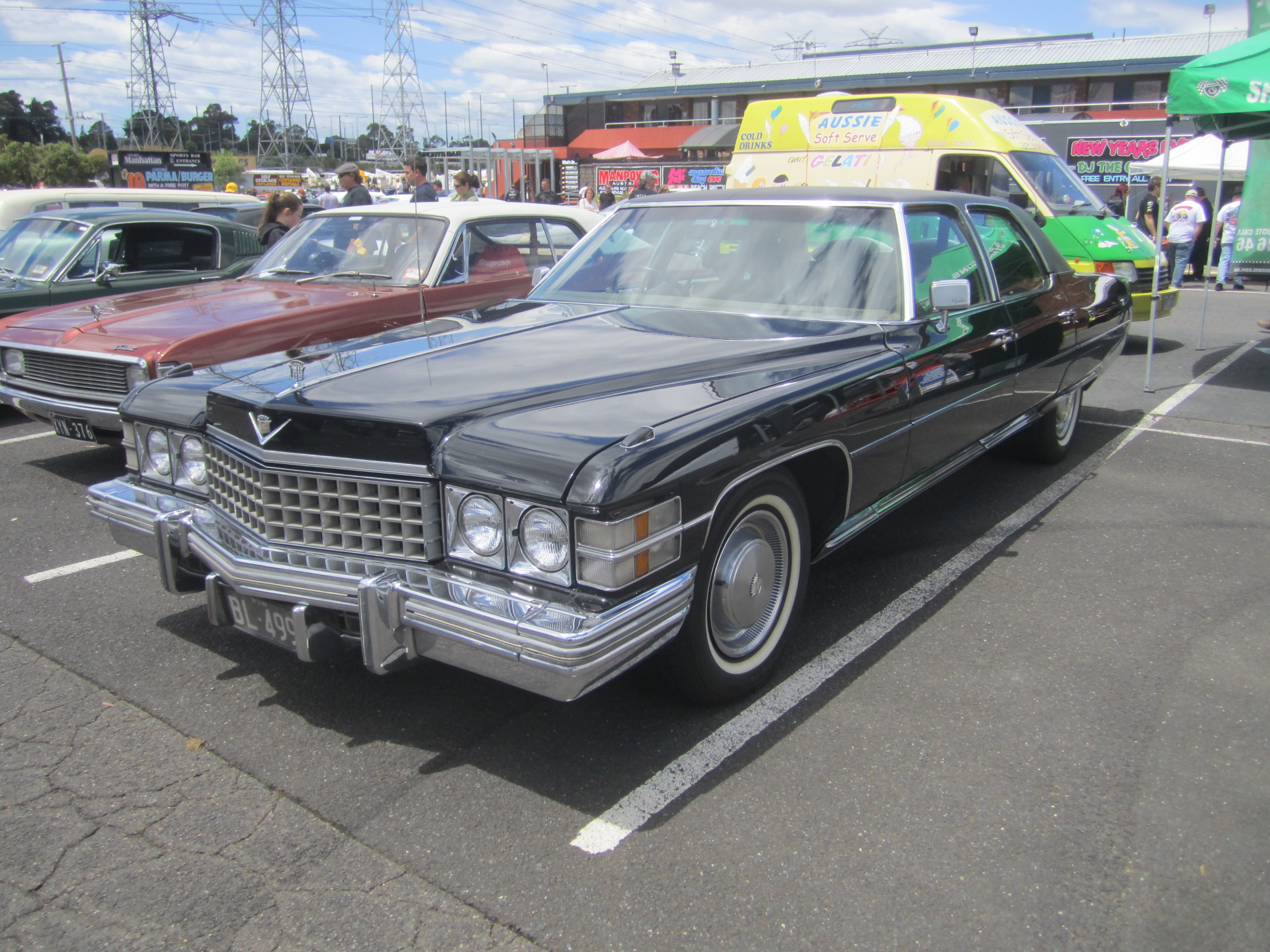
1974 Cadillac Fleetwood 60 Special Brougham

Tenth generation
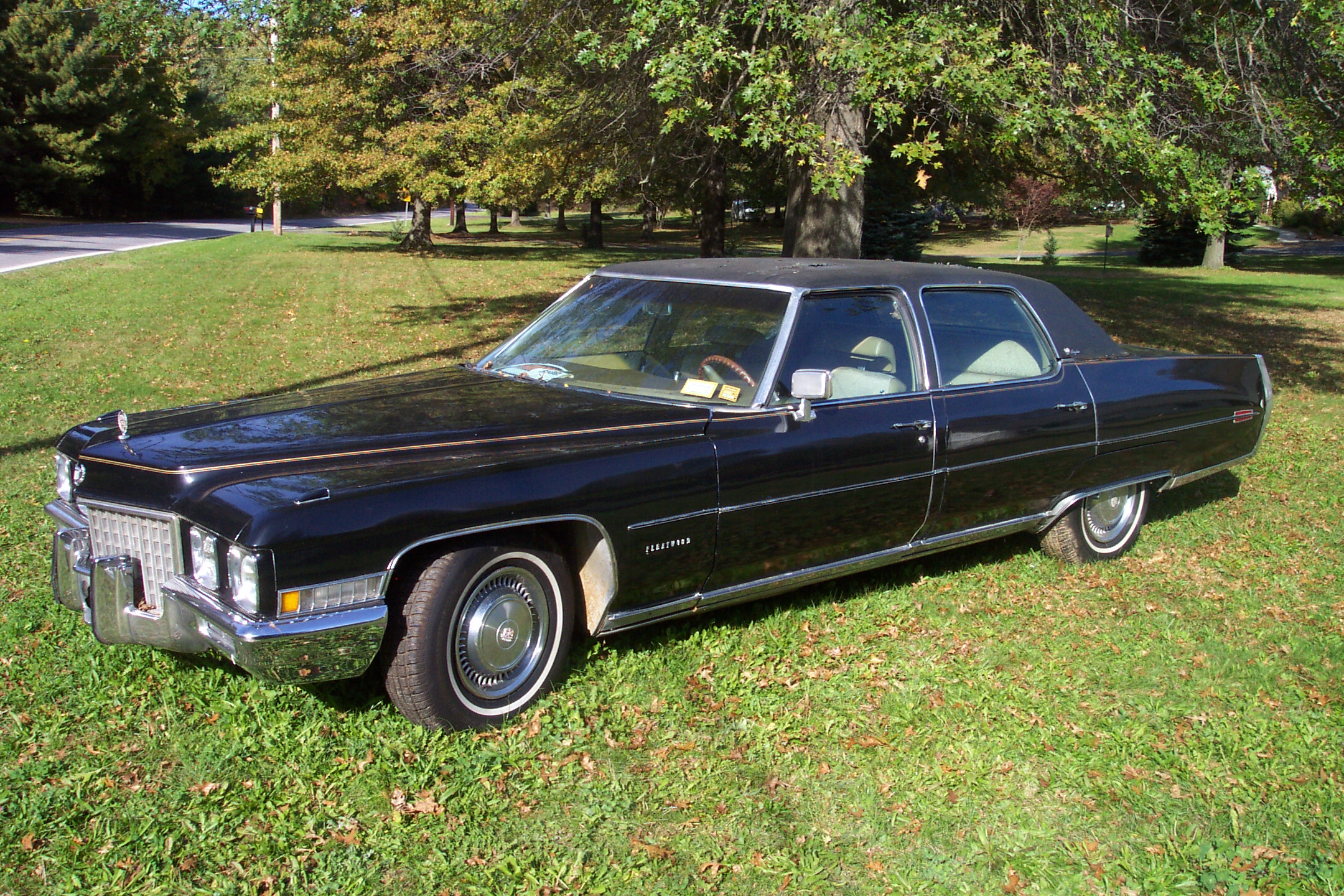
- 1971 Cadillac Fleetwood Sixty Special Brougham

Overview
- Model years: 1971–1976
- Assembly: Detroit Assembly, Detroit, Michigan, U.S. Linden Assembly, Linden, New Jersey, U.S.
- Designer: Bill Mitchell

Body and chassis
- Body style: 4-door sedan
- Layout: FR layout
- Platform: C-body
- Related: Cadillac Calais; Cadillac DeVille; Buick Electra; Oldsmobile 98

Powertrain
- Engine: 472 cu in (7.7 L) OHV V8; 500 cu in (8.2 L) OHV V8
- Transmission: 3-speed TH-400 automatic

Dimensions
- Wheelbase: 133.0 in (3,378 mm)
- Length: 1971: 228.8 in (5,812 mm); 1972: 230.4 in (5,852 mm); 1973: 231.5 in (5,880 mm); 1974–76: 233.7 in (5,936 mm)
- Width: 79.8 in (2,027 mm)
- Height: 1971–73: 55.5 in (1,410 mm); 1974: 55.6 in (1,412 mm); 1975–76: 55.3 in (1,405 mm)
- Curb weight: 5,000–5,400 lb (2,300–2,400 kg)

Chronology
- Successor: Cadillac Fleetwood Brougham

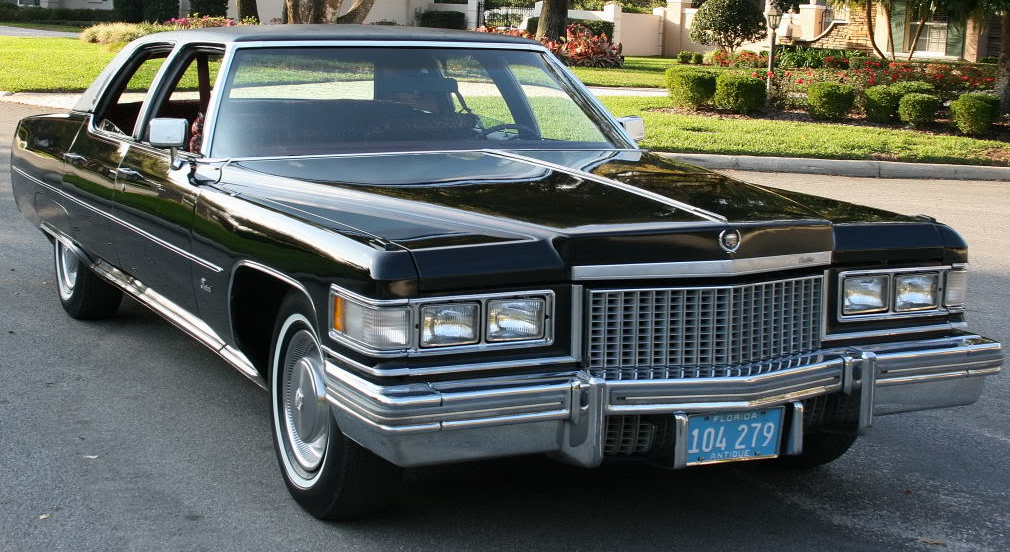
1975 Cadillac Fleetwood 60 Special Brougham

The new GM full-size bodies for 1971, at 64.3 in (1.63 m) front shoulder room – 62.1 in (1.58 m) on Cadillac – and 63.4 in (1.61 m) rear shoulder room – 64.0 in (1.63 m) on Cadillac – set a record for interior width that would not be matched by any car until the full-size GM rear-wheel-drive models of the early to mid-1990s. Following this remodel, the Sixty Special remained basically unchanged through 1976, save for periodic front and rear-end facelifts. The car shared the same styling cues with the lesser Calais and DeVille models. The most dramatic of these changes was the addition of rectangular headlamps in 1975 along with a completely new grille. This configuration was carried through until 1977's first round of drastic GM downsizing, affecting many full-size models — on Cadillac all models but the Eldorado.

For 1971, the lineup was trimmed down to just one Sixty Special model, the Sixty Special Brougham. It still rode on an exclusive 133.0 in (3.38 m) wheelbase, but with all-new sheet metal and a distinctive roof design. The formal new roof was clearly reminiscent of Bill Mitchell's original 1938 Sixty Special, with individually framed, rounded-corner side glass (outlined by a thin chrome bead). Also new on the vinyl top were C-pillar mounted opera lamps and a thick B-pillar, which, along with a narrow body filler panel between the front and rear side doors, heightened the car's custom limousine look. Despite the formal new look and higher levels of luxury, sales dropped slightly from 1970, down to 15,200 units. As before, while the coupe and sedan DeVille remained Cadillac's bread-and-butter cars, the Sixty Special was an exclusive low-volume item sold to its most affluent buyers and the fleet and livery business for conversion to formal limousines and airport cars.

Engine performance began to decrease with EPA restrictions on exhaust emissions and grams per mile emissions requirements, forcing gear ratios to taller and taller ratios, dropping to as low as 2.73:1 for 1975–1976. A new common frame/suspension design was introduced in the latest generation Sixty Special which was also used in other GM full size cars. While the other GM divisions used a front-steer setup (steering linkage in front of the engine crossmember), all Cadillac RWDs retained the 1961-vintage front suspension (rear steering linkage, eccentric cams in the steering knuckle in lieu of shims, strut rods attached to the framerails for caster adjustment). Rear suspensions were now driven by the Pontiac-designed 8 7/8-inch ring-gear 10-bolt Salisbury live axle. A new trailer towing package was added allowing larger trailer loads to be pulled. Coupled with a heavy duty cooling system, 3.23 gearing, high output 80 amp large frame alternator and heavy-duty THM400 transmission, the long wheelbase was ideal to pull trailers weighing up to 7,000 lb (3,200 kg).

1972 marked Cadillac's 70th anniversary. One of the few changes that year was the addition of a chrome molding around the rear window. Sales were a robust 20,750 units at a base price of $7,585. The 1972 Sixty Special Brougham weighed in at an impressive 4,858 pounds shipping weight (over 5,000 pounds curb weight). Standard equipment included rear-seat reading lamps, automatic level control, and dual-comfort front seats. A wide range of upholstery was available in nine colors of "Sierra" grain leather, four colors of "Matador" cloth, a combination of "Matador" cloth and leather, a "Minuet" fabric in three colors, or a plush "Medici" crushed velour.

The 1974 model year saw the introduction of the "Air Cushion Restraint System", which activated airbags in the steering wheel and passenger side of the instrument panel when the car was hit from the front only. The option replaced the glove box with a lockable compartment located under the center of the dashboard. The system was very expensive and therefore unpopular and was dropped as an option after 1976.

For the 1975 model year, the 472ci v8 was replaced by the 500ci v8 previously only available on the Eldorado. As a mid-year change, a Bendix electronic fuel injection was available for the first time, it was the same system used on the Seville introduced at the same time. The front fascia was revised, with the newly federally approved rectangular sealed beam headlamps. Air conditioning was made standard equipment (though it was ordered in over 95% of Cadillacs by this time).

For 1976, automatic door locks (which locked the car when the transmission was shifted out of park and unlocked them as it was shifted into park) and a reclinable passenger seat were offered as optional equipment. The Sixty Special Series was temporarily retired in 1976 but returned again in a new front-wheel drive model for 1987.

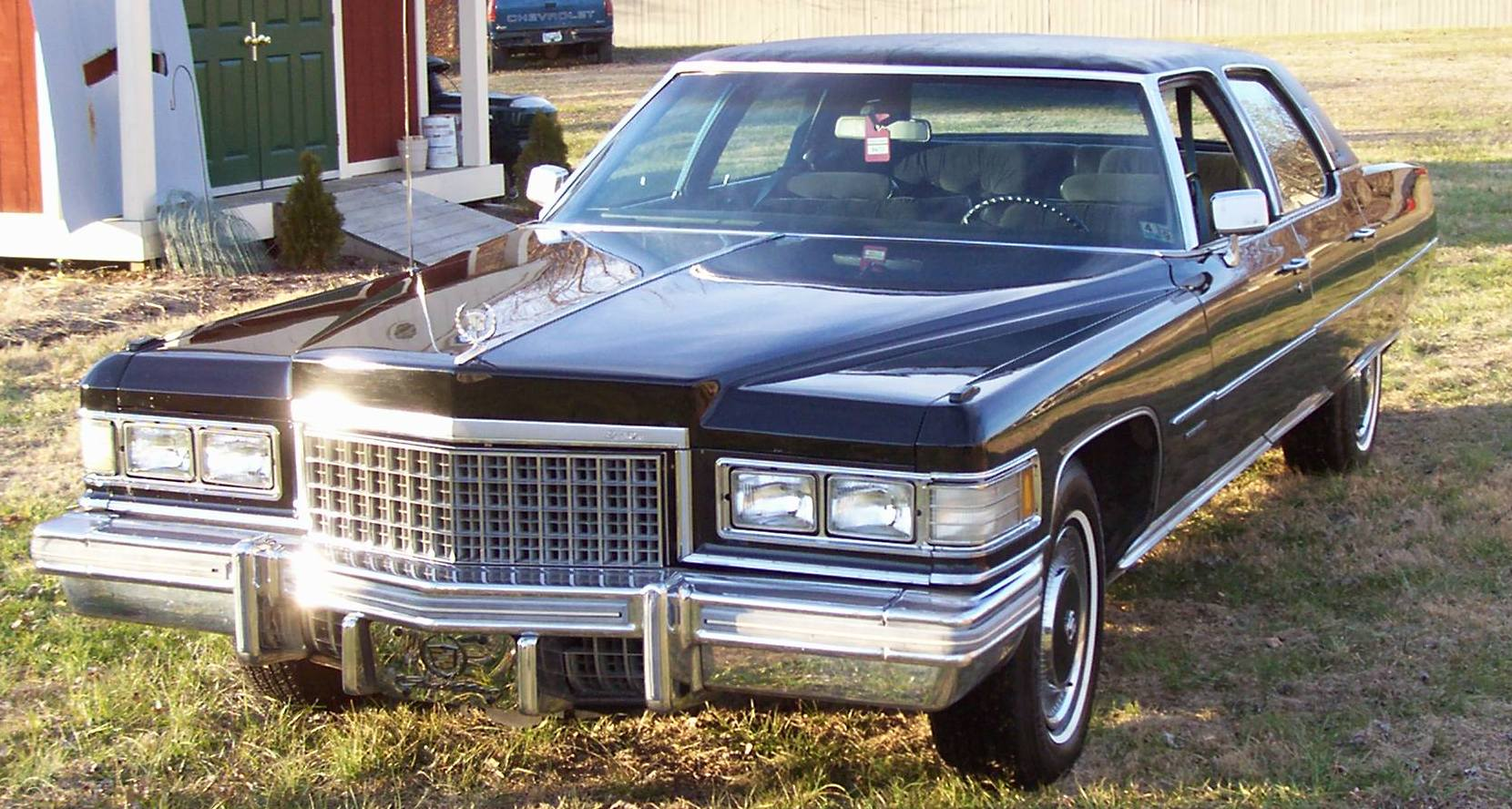
1976 Cadillac Fleetwood 60 Special Brougham d'Elegance

An option package available for the first time in 1973 was the "d'Elegance" package. Adding US$750, this package included a unique "pillow-style" velour seating trim as well as a more plush carpeting and a few additional features optional on the standard models. The same package was offered on the Coupe/Sedan DeVille models in 1974 with a different seating design. The package would become available on various DeVille, Fleetwood Brougham, Brougham, and Fleetwood models in the 1970s, 80s, and 90s with standard features adjusted to suit the decades.

Even more exclusive than the "d'Elegance" was the "Talisman" package, available for the 60 Special for the 1974, 1975, and 1976 model years. A talisman is "anything whose presence exercises a remarkable or powerful influence on human feelings or actions". The package was so exclusive that it superseded both the "Brougham" and "d'elegance" luxury designations. For 1974 the interior featured a center console spanning the entire interior, with the front section housing a writing tablet and the rear a storage space. This seating arrangement turned the spacious Fleetwood Brougham into a four-seat automobile, which possibly led to the discontinuation of the rear seat console in the 1975/76 editions. Seating was initially available in four colors of either leather ($2450) or "Medici" crushed velour ($1800), with the leather dropped after 1974. Matching deep-pile interior carpeting and floormats completed the look. The exterior featured a standard fully padded elk grain vinyl roof, exterior badge identifications, and a stand-up, full-color wreath and crest hood ornament.

== 1987–1988 Fleetwood Sixty Special (FWD) ==
Cadillac Fleetwood Sixty Special

Overview
- Model years: 1987–1988
- Assembly: Madison Heights, Michigan, United States

Body and chassis
- Body style: 4-door sedan
- Layout: Transverse front-engine, front-wheel drive
- Platform: C-body (customized)
- Related: Cadillac DeVille; Buick Electra; Buick Park Avenue; Oldsmobile 98

Powertrain
- Engine: 4.1 L HT-4100 V8
- Transmission: 4-speed 4T60 automatic; 4-speed 4T60E automatic

Dimensions
- Wheelbase: 115.8 in (2,941 mm)
- Length: 201.7 in (5,123 mm)
- Width: 71.7 in (1,820 mm)
- Height: 55.0 in (1,400 mm)
- Curb weight: 3,600–3,800 lb (1,600–1,700 kg)

For model years 1987-1988, Cadillac offered the Fleetwood Sixty Special as an outsourced and customized variant of the (1987–1988) Cadillac Fleetwood, based on the front-wheel-drive GM C-body platform but with its own 115.8" wheelbase and 201.5" overall length.

GM subcontracted coachbuilder Hess and Eisenhardt to customize standard Fleetwoods in a newly outfitted plant in Madison Heights, Michigan: cutting standard Fleetwoods laterally behind the B-pillar; extending and reinforcing the bodywork; covering the cut line with a padded vinyl roof and a wide, ribbed molding at the rocker panel; adding longer doors; and slightly modifying and re-installing the interior. The rear doors themselves were wider, with the windows retained from a typical Deville/Fleetwood and shifted to the leading (forward) edge of the door — so as to create a small vertical section of vinyl-covered metal at the rear edge of the window — giving the illusion of wider C-pillars.

In addition to 5 inches of extra rear seat leg room, the Fleetwood Sixty Special included dual rear-seat headrests, three-position footrests (mounted onto the backs of the 55/45 split front seat) and two illuminated vanity mirrors located in an overhead console.

Similarly equipped to the standard-size Fleetwood d'Elegance, the Fleetwood Sixty Special included an anti-lock braking system (a $925 Fleetwood option) and a stainless-steel exhaust system not available on other Cadillacs. In 1987, the model carried a base price of $34,850 ($98,762 in 2025 dollars), roughly $8,700 (1987) over the price of the Fleetwood d'Elegance. The price dropped by $100 for 1988.

== 1989–1992 Fleetwood Sixty Special and 1993 Sixty Special (FWD) ==
Eleventh generation
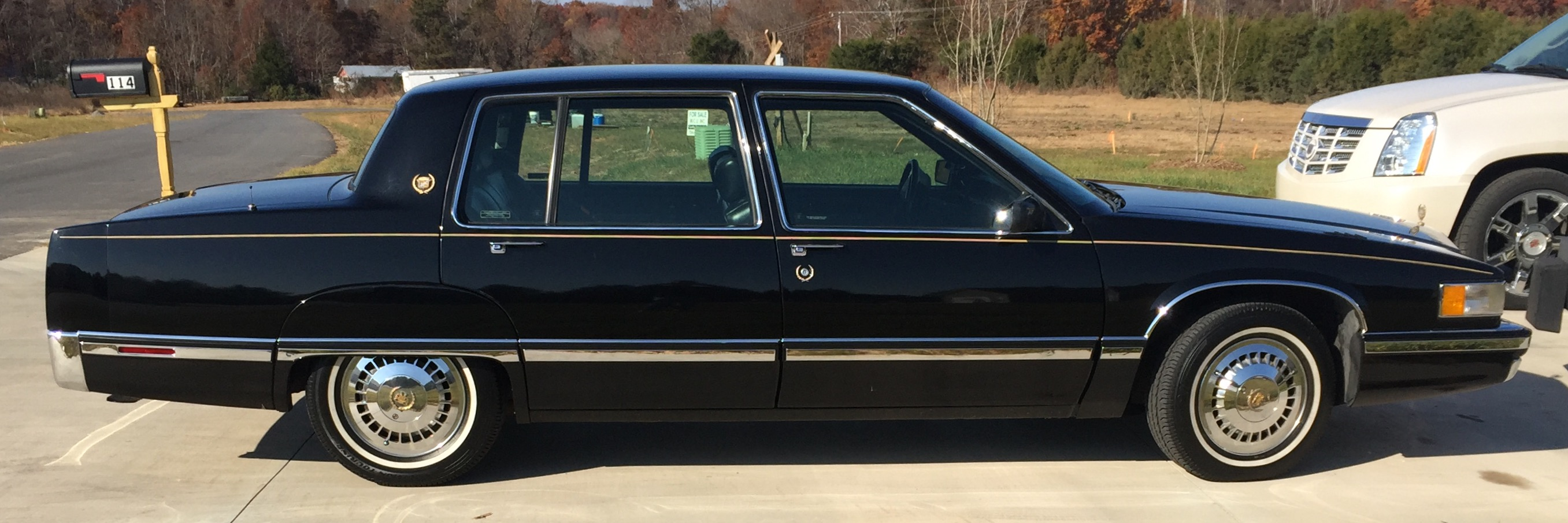

Overview
- Model years: 1989–1993
- Assembly: Lake Orion, Michigan, United States
- Designer: Irv Rybicki

Body and chassis
- Body style: 4-door sedan
- Layout: Transverse front-engine, front-wheel drive
- Platform: C-body
- Related: Cadillac DeVille; Buick Electra; Buick Park Avenue; Oldsmobile 98

Powertrain
- Engine: 4.5 L 4.5 V8; 4.9 L L26 V8
- Transmission: 4-speed 4T60 automatic; 4-speed 4T60E automatic

Dimensions
- Wheelbase: 113.8 in (2,891 mm)
- Length: 205.3 in (5,210 mm); 1990–93: 205.6 in (5,220 mm)
- Width: 72.5 in (1,840 mm); 1990: 71.7 in (1,820 mm); 1991–93: 73.4 in (1,860 mm)
- Height: 89: 55.0 in (1,400 mm); 1990–93: 55.2 in (1,400 mm)
- Curb weight: 3,600–3,800 lb (1,600–1,700 kg)

Following the subcontracted 1987-88 Fleetwood Sixty Special, the 1989 model again entered series (in-house) production, sharing the same 113.8 in (2,890 mm) wheelbase with the De Ville and Fleetwood. The model now had a lower base price of $34,230.

The 1989-1992 models were differentiated by a standard interior trim package that included heated leather seats designed and manufactured by Lear Siegler with 22-way adjustability. The power, driver and passenger seats were styled by Giorgetto Giugiaro and featured a center clamshell armrest in front and a rear armrest with dual slide-out cup holders; and an electrically powered slide-out storage bin between the front seats that also accommodated two cup holders.

Model Year 1989: Cadillac produced 2,007 1989 Fleetwood Sixty Special sedans. Eleven exterior color choices increased to eleven from six. Interiors featured standard leather upholstery, available in dark blue, deep red and medium gray. The 'clam-shell' front seat center armrest opened from the rear, allowing access to rear seat passengers, while the rear seat center armrest held a slide-out console with two cup holders and a storage cubby. A driver's-side airbag was optional.

Model Year 1990: The 1990 Fleetwood Sixty Special had a base price of $36,980, and 1,817 were manufactured. A driver's-side airbag was now standard, and the telescoping steering column was discontinued. The tilt feature remained. Exteriors were available in eleven colors (including three shades of gray that were new for 1990. Interiors were available in three 'Ultrasoft' leather colors: Garnet Red, Very Dark Sapphire (Blue), and a new color - Medium Slate Gray.

Model Year 1991: The electrically powered slide out storage drawer was replaced with a storage armrest containing a flip-out cup holder, removable coin holder, and compact disc storage. Adjustable air ducts for rear-seat passengers were added to the back of the revised front seat armrest base. 879 Fleetwood Sixty Special models were manufactured for 1991, with a base price of $38,325.

Model Year 1992: For the MY 1992, 554 Fleetwood Sixty Special sedans (base price $39,860) were manufactured.

Model Year 1993: For MY 1993, the Sixty Special nameplate was decoupled from the Fleetwood nameplate for the first and only time in 53 years. With some ambiguity, the Fleetwood nameplate was transferred to the 1993 rear-wheel-drive D-body Cadillac Brougham — which restored the Fleetwood Brougham name to the car for the first time since 1986. 1993 was the last year Cadillac used the Sixty Special nomenclature.

Otherwise, the Sixty Special was largely the same as the 1989-1992 De Ville and Fleetwood models, differing in seating and trim differences. The Sixty Special was now available only as a sedan and carried a lower base price of $34,230.

Cloth upholstery, marketed as Esteem cloth, was now standard, with leather optional. While the Sixty Special retained genuine American walnut trim on the doors and dashboard, the highly adjustable seating became theoptional $3,550 "Ultra" package. Only 686 of the 5,286 Sixty Specials (priced at $37,230) built in 1993 were ordered with the "Ultra" interior.

A 1993 Sixty Special Coupe was planned and was described in the "Advance Preview Book," a July 1982 dealership supplement offering information about the upcoming 1993 model year. By September 12 of that year, the coupe was dropped from production after just one car was manufactured. While it was based on the Sedan De Ville, the Sixty Special sedan included standard equipment optional on the De Ville. In addition, several Sixty Special options not available on the De Ville, including a driver's side 2-position memory seat and individual power recliners for the front seats. Exterior differences included rear wheel fender skirts.

Transmissions:

- 1987–1989 4T60 (440-T4)
- 1990–1993 4T60E

Engines
| Displacement | Power | Torque |
|---|---|---|
| 250 cu in (4.1 L) HT-4100 V8 | 135 hp (101 kW) | 190 lb⋅ft (258 N⋅m) |
| 273 cu in (4.5 L) HT-4500 V8 | 155 hp (116 kW) | 240 lb⋅ft (325 N⋅m) |
| 273 cu in (4.5 L) HT-4500 V8 | 180 hp (134 kW) | 245 lb⋅ft (332 N⋅m) |
| 300 cu in (4.9 L) HT-4900 V8 | 200 hp (149 kW) | 275 lb⋅ft (373 N⋅m) |
