= List of Cadillac vehicles =

From 1902 to the modern day, Cadillac, a division of General Motors, has introduced many models with differing engines to establish itself as the premier luxury car in the United States. As of 2025, Cadillac is the last remaining major North American-based car company other than Tesla to still regularly make sedans, as most other North American-based car companies have instead shifting to making only SUVs and pickup trucks.

== Current production vehicles ==
Vehicles currently not sold in the United States and Canada

Model		Calendar year introduced	Current model		Vehicle Description
Image	Name(s)	Calendar year introduced	Introduction	Update/facelift	Vehicle Description
Sedans
	CT5	2019	2019	2025	Executive sedan. It is also marketed in a high-performance version called the CT5-V.
	CT6	2016	2023	–	Full-size luxury sedan. Discontinued in North America and Europe after 2020, continued production in China. Replaced by Celestiq in North America.
	Celestiq	2023	2023	–	Electric full-size luxury sedan. Replacing CT6 in North America and serving as an electric derivative.
SUVs/Crossovers
	XT4	2018	2018	2024	Subcompact luxury crossover SUV. It is related to the latest model Buick Envision. Discontinued in North America after 2025, continued production in China.
	XT5	2016	2024		Compact luxury crossover SUV. Related to the GMC Terrain and Chevrolet Equinox.
	Optiq	2023	2023	–	Battery electric compact luxury crossover SUV served as an electric derivative of XT4.
	XT6	2019	2019		Three-row mid-size luxury crossover SUV. Related to the GMC Acadia and Chevrolet Traverse. Discontinued in North America after 2025, continued production in China.
	Lyriq	2022	2022	–	Battery electric mid-size luxury crossover SUV served as an electric derivative of XT5.
	Vistiq	2025	2026	–	Battery electric three-row mid-size luxury crossover SUV served as an electric derivative of XT6.
	Escalade	1998	2021	2024	Full-size luxury SUV. Related to the Chevrolet Tahoe, Chevrolet Suburban and GMC Yukon.
	Escalade IQ	2023	2023	–	Electric derivative of the Escalade. Closely related to GMC Hummer EV and Chevrolet Silverado EV.

== Former production vehicles ==
Exterior	Name	Introd.	Discont.	Platforms	Gen.	Information / notes
	Runabout / Tonneau (Note: Models include Model A–G, K, M, S, T.)	1902	1908		9	The first automobile produced by Cadillac
	Model D	1905	1905		1	
	Model Thirty	1909	1911		1	
	V8 Type 51	1915	1923		1	Full-size luxury car
	Type V-63	1924	1930	C-body	1	Full-size luxury car
	V-16	1930	1940	D-body	2	Full-size luxury sedan, coupe, convertible and limousine
	V-12	1930	1937	D-body	2	Full-size luxury sedan, coupe, convertible and limousine
	Series 355	1931	1935	C-body	1	Full-size luxury sedan, coupe, convertible and limousine
	Series 70	1936	1987	D-body	11	Full-size luxury sedan, coupe, convertible and limousine
	Series 60	1936	1938	B-body	1	Full-size luxury sedan, coupe and convertible
	Series 65	1937	1938	C-body	1	Full-size luxury sedan and convertible
	Sixty Special	1938	1993	C-body	11	Full-size luxury sedan
	Series 61	1938	1951	B-body	4	Full-size luxury sedan, coupe and convertible
	Series 62	1940	1964	C-body	7	Full-size luxury sedan, coupe and convertible
	Eldorado	1952	2002		12	Personal luxury coupe
	de Ville	1959	2005		8	Full-size luxury sedan
	Calais	1965	1976	C-body	2	Full-size luxury sedan, hardtop and coupe
	Seville	1975	2004	K-body (1975–1997); G-body (1997–2004)	5	Mid-size luxury sedan
	Fleetwood	1976	1996	D-body	3	Full-size luxury sedan and coupe
	Fleetwood Brougham	1977	1986	D-body	1	Full-size luxury sedan and coupe
	Cimarron	1981	1988	J-body	1	Compact luxury sedan
	Brougham	1986	1992	D-body	1	Full-size luxury sedan
	Allanté	1987	1993	V-body	1	Luxury roadster
	Catera	1996	2001	V-body	1	Mid-size luxury sedan
	CTS	2002	2019	Sigma (2002–2014); Alpha (2014–2019)	3	Mid-size luxury sedan and coupe
	SRX	2003	2016	Sigma (2003–2009); Theta (2010–2016)	2	Compact luxury crossover
	XLR	2003	2009	Y-body	1	Luxury sports coupe with retractable hardtop
	DTS	2005	2011	G-body	1	Full-size luxury sedan
	BLS	2005	2009	Epsilon	1	Compact luxury sedan and station wagon mainly marketed in Europe
	STS	2005	2011	Sigma	1	Mid-size luxury sedan
	ATS	2012	2019	Alpha	1	Compact luxury sedan and coupe
	XTS	2013	2019	Epsilon II	1	Full-size luxury sedan
	ELR	2013	2016	Delta II	1	Compact luxury plug-in hybrid coupe
	CT4	2019	2026	Alpha 2	1	Compact executive sedan. It was also marketed in a high-performance version called the CT4-V
	GT4	2023	2026	E2XX	1	Compact luxury crossover SUV for the Chinese market

=== Brands ===
Exterior	Name	Introd.	Discont.	Platforms	Gen.	Information / notes
	LaSalle	1927	1940	GM B	3	GM's brand part of the companion make program that marketed luxury vehicles to supplement Cadillac

== 1900s ==
- 1902–1903 Cadillac Runabout and Tonneau – 72 in wheelbase single-cylinder engine
- 1903–1904 Cadillac Model A – 72 in wheelbase single-cylinder engine
- 1904 Cadillac Models A and B
  - Model A – 72 in wheelbase single-cylinder engine
  - Model B – 76 in wheelbase single-cylinder engine
- 1905 Cadillac Models B, C, D, E, and F
  - Model B – 76 in wheelbase single-cylinder engine
  - Model C – 72 in wheelbase single-cylinder engine
  - Model D – 100 in wheelbase four-cylinder engine
  - Model E – 74 in wheelbase single-cylinder engine
  - Model F – 76 in wheelbase single-cylinder engine
- 1906 Cadillac Models H, K, L, and M
  - Model H – 102 in wheelbase four-cylinder engine
  - Model K – 74 in wheelbase single-cylinder engine
  - Model L – 110 in wheelbase four-cylinder engine
  - Model M – 76 in wheelbase single-cylinder engine
- 1907 Cadillac Models G, H, K, and M
  - Model G – 100 in wheelbase four-cylinder engine
  - Model H – 102 in wheelbase four-cylinder engine
  - Model K – 74 in wheelbase single-cylinder engine
  - Model M – 76 in wheelbase single-cylinder engine
- 1908 Cadillac Models G, H, M, S and T
  - Model G – 100 in wheelbase four-cylinder engine
  - Model H – 102 in wheelbase four-cylinder engine
  - Model M – 76 in wheelbase single-cylinder engine
  - Model S – 82 in wheelbase single-cylinder engine
  - Model T – 82 in wheelbase single-cylinder engine
- 1909–1911 Cadillac Model Thirty
  - 1909 – 106 in wheelbase four-cylinder engine

== 1910s ==
  - 1910 – 110 in wheelbase; 120 in wheelbase (limousine) four-cylinder engine Fisher
  - 1911 – 116 in wheelbase four-cylinder engine Fisher
- 1912 – Cadillac Model 1912; 116 in wheelbase four-cylinder engine Fisher
- 1913 – Cadillac Model 1913; 120 in wheelbase four-cylinder engine Fisher
- 1914 – Cadillac Model 1914; 120 and 134 in wheelbase four-cylinder engine Fisher
- 1915 – Cadillac Type 51; 122 and 145 in wheelbase V8 Fisher
- 1916 – Cadillac Type 53; 122 132 and 145 in wheelbase V8 Fisher
- 1917 – Cadillac Type 55; 125 and 145 in wheelbase V8 Fisher
- 1918–1919 Cadillac Type 57; 125 132 and 145 in wheelbase V8 Fisher

== 1920s ==
- 1920–1921 Cadillac Type 59; 122 and 132 in wheelbase V8 Fisher
- 1922–1923 Cadillac Type 61; 132 in wheelbase V8 Fisher
- 1924 – Cadillac Type V-63; 132 and 145 in wheelbase V8 Fisher
- 1925 – Cadillac Type V-63; 132 138 and 145 in wheelbase V8 Fisher Fleetwood
- 1926–1927 Cadillac Series 314; 132 138 and 150 in wheelbase V8 Fisher Fleetwood
- 1928 – Cadillac Series 341-A; 140 and 152 in wheelbase V8 Fisher Fleetwood
- 1929 – Cadillac Series 341-B; 140 and 152 in wheelbase V8 Fisher Fleetwood

== 1930s ==
- 1930 Cadillac Series 353, 370 and 452 Fisher Fleetwood
  - Series 353 – 140 and 152 in wheelbase V8 Fisher Fleetwood
  - Series 370 – 140 143 and 152 in wheelbase V12 Fisher Fleetwood
  - Series 452 – 148 in wheelbase V16 Fisher Fleetwood
- 1931 Cadillac Series 355, 370-A and 452-A Fisher Fleetwood
  - Series 355 – 134 and 152 in wheelbase V8 Fleetwood
  - Series 370-A – 140 143 and 152 in wheelbase V12 Fleetwood
  - Series 452-A – 148 in wheelbase V16 Fisher Fleetwood
- 1932 Cadillac Series 355-B, 370-B and 452-B Fisher Fleetwood
  - Series 355-B – 134 and 156 in wheelbase V8 Fisher Fleetwood
  - Series 370-B – 140 and 156 in wheelbase V12 Fisher Fleetwood
  - Series 452-B – 143 and 149 in wheelbase V16 Fisher Fleetwood
- 1933 Cadillac Series 355-C, 370-C and 452-C Fisher Fleetwood
  - Series 355-C – 140 and 156 in wheelbase V8
  - Series 370-C – 134 140 and 156 in wheelbase V12
  - Series 452-C – 143 and 149 in wheelbase V16
- 1934 Cadillac Series 10, 20, 30 and 452-D Fisher Fleetwood
  - Series 10 – 128 in wheelbase V8
  - Series 20 – 136 in wheelbase V8
  - Series 30 – 146 in wheelbase V8
  - Series 355-D
  - Series 370-D – 146 in wheelbase V12
  - Series 452-D – 154 in wheelbase V16
- 1935 Cadillac Series 10, 20, 30 and 452-D Fisher Fleetwood
  - Series 10 – 128 in wheelbase V8
  - Series 20 – 136 in wheelbase V8
  - Series 30 – 146 in wheelbase V8
  - Series 370-D – 146 and 160 in wheelbase V12
  - Series 452-D or 60 – 154 in wheelbase V16
- 1936 Cadillac Series 36–60, 36–70, 36–75, 36–80, 36–85, 36-90 Fisher Fleetwood
  - Series 36-60 – 121 in wheelbase V8
  - Series 36-70 – 131 in wheelbase V8
  - Series 36-75 – 138 in wheelbase V8
  - Series 36-80 – 131 and 160 in wheelbase V12
  - Series 36-85 – 138 in wheelbase V12
  - Series 36-90 – 154 in wheelbase V16
- 1937 Cadillac Series 36–60, 37–65, 37–70, 37–75, 37–85, 37-90 Fisher Fleetwood
  - Series 37-60 – 124 and 160.75 in wheelbase V8
  - Series 37-65 – 131 in wheelbase V8
  - Series 37-70 – 131 in wheelbase V8
  - Series 37-75 – 138 and 156 in wheelbase V8
  - Series 37-85 – 138 in wheelbase V12
  - Series 37-90 – 154 in wheelbase V16
- 1938 Cadillac Series 38–60, 38-60S, 38–65, 38–75, 38-90 Fisher Fleetwood
  - Series 38-60 – 124 and 160 in wheelbase V8
  - Series 38-60S – 127 in wheelbase V8
  - Series 38-65 – 132 in wheelbase V8
  - Series 38-75 – 141 and 160 in wheelbase V8
  - Series 38-90 – 141 in wheelbase V16
- 1939 Cadillac Series 39-60S, 39–65, 39–75, 39-90 Fisher Fleetwood
  - Series 39-60S – 127 in wheelbase V8
  - Series 39-61 – 126 and 162_ in wheelbase V8
  - Series 39-75 – 141 and 161_ in wheelbase V8
  - Series 39-90 – 141 in wheelbase V16

== 1940s ==
- 1940 Cadillac Series 40-60S, 40–62, 40–72, 40–75, 40-90 Fisher Fleetwood
  - Series 40-60S – 127 in wheelbase V8
  - Series 40-62 – 129 in wheelbase V8
  - Series 40-72 – 138 and 165_ in wheelbase V8
  - Series 40-75 – 141 and 161_ in wheelbase V8
  - Series 40-90 – 141 in wheelbase V16
- 1941 Cadillac Series 41-60S, 41–61, 41–62, 41–63, 41–67, 41-75 Fisher Fleetwood
  - Series 41-60S – 126 in wheelbase V8
  - Series 41-61 – 126 in wheelbase V8
  - Series 41-62 – 126 and 163 in wheelbase V8
  - Series 41-63 – 126 in wheelbase V8
  - Series 41-67 – 139 in wheelbase V8
  - Series 41-75 – 136 and 163 in wheelbase V8
- 1942 Cadillac Series 42-60S, 42–61, 42–62, 42–63, 42–67, 42-75 Fisher Fleetwood
  - Series 42-60S Fleetwood – 133 in wheelbase V8
  - Series 42-61 – 126 in wheelbase V8
  - Series 42-62 – 129 in wheelbase V8
  - Series 42-63 – 126 in wheelbase V8
  - Series 42-67 – 139 in wheelbase V8
  - Series 42-75 – 136 and 163 in wheelbase V8
- 1946 Cadillac Series 60S, 61, 62, 75 Fisher Fleetwood
  - Series 60S Fleetwood – 133 in wheelbase V8
  - Series 61 – 126 in wheelbase V8
  - Series 62 – 129 in wheelbase V8
  - Series 75 – 136 in wheelbase V8
- 1947 Cadillac Series 60S, 61, 62, 75 Fisher Fleetwood
  - Series 60S Fleetwood – 133 in wheelbase V8
  - Series 61 – 126 in wheelbase V8
  - Series 62 – 129 in wheelbase V8
  - Series 75 – 138 in wheelbase V8
- 1948-1949 Cadillac Series 60S, 61, 62, 75 Fisher Fleetwood
  - Series 60S Fleetwood – 133 in wheelbase V8
  - Series 61 – 126 in wheelbase V8
  - Series 62 – 126 in wheelbase V8
  - Series 75 – 136 in wheelbase V8

== 1950s ==
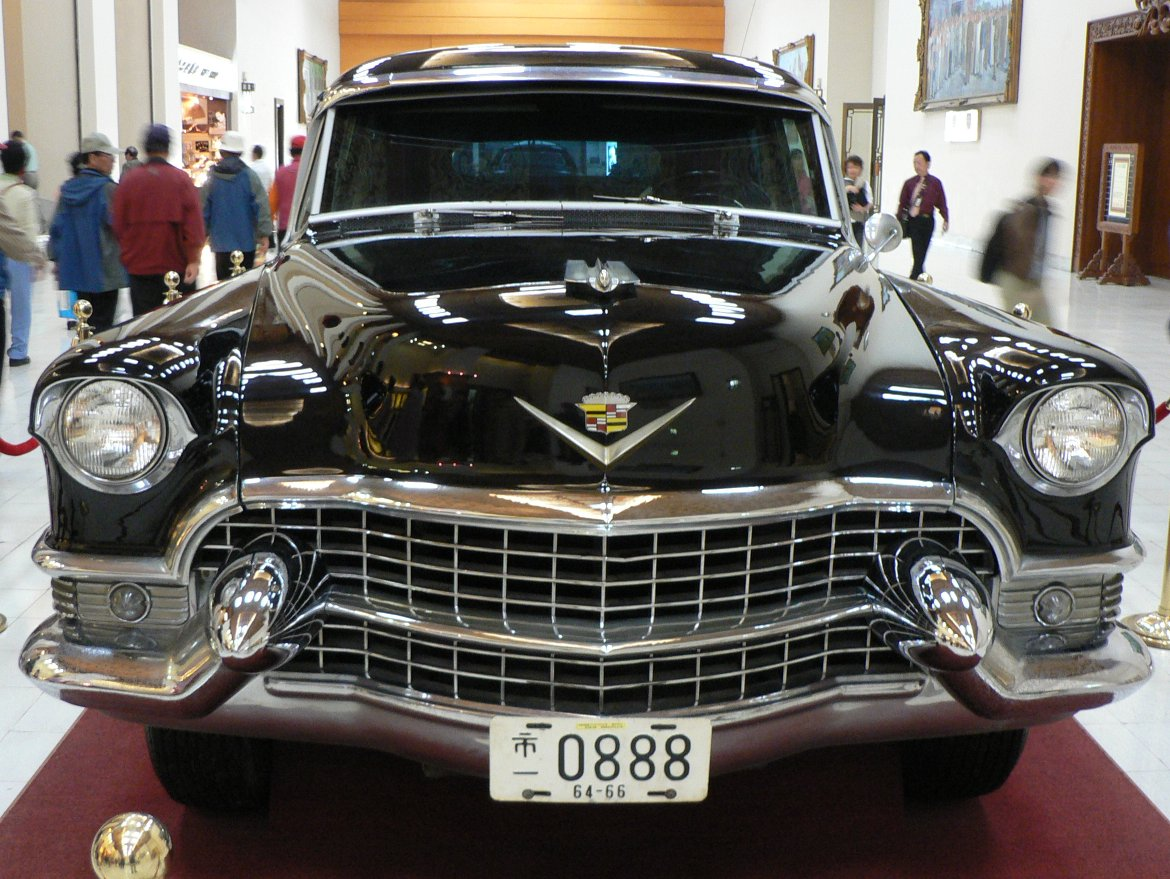
Chiang Kai-shek's Cadillac

- 1950–1951 Cadillac Series 60S, 61, 62, 75 Fisher Fleetwood
  - All models were equipped with the 331 cu. in. (5.4L) V8
  - Series 60S Fleetwood – 130 in wheelbase
  - Series 61 – 122 in wheelbase
  - Series 62 – 126 in wheelbase
  - Series 75 – 146.75 in wheelbase
- 1952 Cadillac Series 60S, 62, 75 Fisher Fleetwood
  - All models were equipped with the 331 cu. in. (5.4L) V8
  - Series 60S Fleetwood – 130 in wheelbase
  - Series 62 – 126 in wheelbase
  - Series 75 – 147 in wheelbase
- 1953 Cadillac Series 60S, 62, 75 Fisher Fleetwood
  - All models were equipped with the 331 cu. in. (5.4L) V8
  - Series 60S Fleetwood – 130 in wheelbase
  - Series 62 – 126 in wheelbase
  - Series 62 Eldorado – 126 in wheelbase
    - Introduced as a limited edition late in the production year only in a convertible
  - Series 75 – 146.75 in wheelbase
- 1954-1955 Cadillac Series 60S, 62, 75 Fisher Fleetwood
  - All models were equipped with the 331 cu. in. (5.4L) V8
  - Series 60S Fleetwood – 133 in wheelbase
  - Series 62 – 129 in wheelbase
  - Eldorado – 129 in wheelbase
    - After production of the '53 Series 62 Eldorado, the Eldorado was branded on its own. It was a convertible similar to the Series 62 convertible, but was much more.
  - Series 75 – 149.8 in wheelbase
- 1956 Cadillac Series 60S, 62, 75 Fisher Fleetwood
  - All models were equipped with the 365 cu. in. (6.0L) V8
  - Series 60S Fleetwood – 133 in wheelbase
  - Series 62 – 129 in wheelbase
  - Eldorado – 129 in wheelbase
    - First year to offer both convertible and hardtop (Coupe Seville)
  - Series 75 – 149.75 in wheelbase
- 1957 Cadillac Series 60S, 62, 70, 75 Fisher Fleetwood
  - All models were equipped with the 365 cu. in. (6.0L) V8
  - Series 60S Fleetwood – 133 in wheelbase
  - Series 62 – 129.5 in wheelbase
  - Eldorado – 129.5 in wheelbase
    - Offered 4 door Sedan Seville option
  - Series 70 Eldorado Brougham – 126 in wheelbase
  - Series 75 – 149.7 in wheelbase
- 1958 Cadillac Series 60S, 62, 70, 75 Fisher Fleetwood
  - All models were equipped with the 365 cu. in. (6.0L) V8
  - Series 60S Fleetwood – 133 in wheelbase
  - Series 62 – 129.5 in wheelbase
  - Eldorado – 129.5 in wheelbase
    - 4 door option replaced with Special Coupe by special order only in limited quantities
  - Series 70 Eldorado Brougham – 126 in wheelbase
  - Series 75 – 149.7 in wheelbase
- 1959–1960 Cadillac Series 60S, 62, 63, 64, 69, 75 Fisher Fleetwood
  - All models were equipped with the 390 cu. in. (6.4L) V8
  - Series 60S Fleetwood – 130 in wheelbase
  - Series 6200 – 130 in wheelbase
    - replaced previous Series 62
  - Series 6300 – 130 in wheelbase "De Ville" sub-series
  - Series 6400 – 130 in wheelbase "Eldorado" sub-series
  - Series 6900 – 130 in wheelbase "Eldorado Brougham"
  - Series 6700 – 149.75 in wheelbase "Fleetwood 75"

== 1960s ==
- 1961–1964 Cadillac Series 60S, 62, 75 Fisher Fleetwood
  - Series 60S Fleetwood – 129.5 in wheelbase V8
  - Series 62 – 129.5 in wheelbase V8
  - Series 75 – 149.8 in wheelbase V8
- 1965–1966 Cadillac Calais, De Ville, and Fleetwood Fisher Fleetwood
  - Calais – 129.5 in wheelbase V8
  - DeVille/Coupe de Ville – 129.5 in wheelbase V8
  - Fleetwood – 133 149.8 and 156 in wheelbase V8
- 1967–1970 Cadillac Calais, De Ville, and Fleetwood Fisher Fleetwood
  - Calais – 129.5 in wheelbase V8
  - DeVille/Coupe de Ville – 129.5 in wheelbase V8
  - Fleetwood – 120 133 149.8 and 156 in wheelbase V8

== 1970s ==
- 1970–1973 Cadillac Calais, De Ville, and Fleetwood Fisher Fleetwood
  - Calais – 130 in wheelbase V8
  - DeVille/Coupe de Ville – 130 in wheelbase V8
  - Fleetwood – 126.3 133 151.5 and 157.5 in wheelbase V8
- 1974 – Cadillac Calais, De Ville, and Fleetwood Fisher Fleetwood
  - Calais – 130 in wheelbase V8
  - DeVille/Coupe de Ville – 130 in wheelbase V8
  - Fleetwood – 126 133 151.5 and 157.5 in wheelbase V8
- 1975 – Cadillac Calais, De Ville, Seville, and Fleetwood Fisher Fleetwood
  - Calais – 130 in wheelbase V8
  - DeVille/Coupe de Ville – 130 in wheelbase V8
  - Seville – 114.3 in wheelbase V8
  - Fleetwood – 126.3 133 151.5 and 157.5 in wheelbase V8
- 1976 – Cadillac Calais, De Ville, Seville, and Fleetwood Fisher Fleetwood
  - Calais – 130 in wheelbase V8
  - DeVille/Coupe de Ville – 130 in wheelbase V8
  - Seville – 114.3 in wheelbase V8
  - Fleetwood – 126.3 133 151.5 and 157.5 in wheelbase V8
- 1977–1979
  - Coupe de Ville – 121.5 in (3,090 mm) wheelbase, V8
  - Sedan de Ville – 121.5 in (3,090 mm) wheelbase, V8
  - Fleetwood Brougham – 121.5 in (3,090 mm) wheelbase, V8
- 1971–1978
  - Eldorado – 126.3 in (3,210 mm) wheelbase, V8
- 1979–1985
  - Eldorado – 114 in (2,900 mm) wheelbase, V6 or V8

== 1980s ==
- 1980–1985
  - Seville – 114.3 in (2,900 mm) wheelbase, V8
- 1982–1988
  - Cimarron– 101.2 in (2,570 mm) wheelbase, V6
- 1980–1984
  - Coupe de Ville – 121.5 in (3,090 mm) wheelbase, V8
  - Sedan de Ville – 121.5 in (3,090 mm) wheelbase, V8
- 1985–1988
  - Coupe de Ville – 110.8 in (2,810 mm) wheelbase, V8
  - Sedan de Ville – 110.8 in (2,810 mm) wheelbase, V8
  - Fleetwood – 110.8 in (2,810 mm) wheelbase, V8
  - Fleetwood 75 – 134.4 in (3,410 mm) wheelbase, V8
- 1987–1988
  - Fleetwood Sixty Special – 115.8 in (2,940 mm) wheelbase, V8
- 1979–1985
  - Eldorado – 113.9 in (2,890 mm) wheelbase, V6 or V8
- 1986–1991
  - Eldorado – 108 in (2,700 mm) wheelbase, V6 or V8
- 1987–1993
  - Allanté – 99.4 in (2,520 mm) wheelbase, V8
- 1989–1993
  - Coupe de Ville – 110.8 in (2,810 mm) wheelbase, V8
  - Sedan de Ville – 113.8 in (2,890 mm) wheelbase, V8
  - Fleetwood – 113.8 in (2,890 mm) wheelbase, V8
- 1980–1986
  - Fleetwood Brougham – 121.5 in (3,090 mm) wheelbase, V8
- 1987–1989
  - Brougham – 121.5 in (3,090 mm) wheelbase, V8

== 1990s ==
- 1992–2002
  - Eldorado – 108 in (2,700 mm) wheelbase, V8
- 1989–1993
  - Coupe DeVille – 110.8 in (2,810 mm) wheelbase, V8
- 1989–1993
  - Sedan DeVille – 113.8 in (2,890 mm) wheelbase, V8
- 1992–1997
  - Seville – 111.0 in (2,820 mm) wheelbase, V8
- 1994–1999
  - DeVille – 113.8 in (2,890 mm) wheelbase, V8
- 1997–2001
  - Catera – 107.5 in (2,730 mm) wheelbase, V6
- 1989–1992
  - Fleetwood – 113.8 in (2,890 mm) wheelbase, V8
- 1990–1992
  - Brougham – 121.5 in (3,090 mm) wheelbase, V8
- 1993–1996
  - Fleetwood – 121.5 in (3,090 mm) wheelbase, V8
- 1993
  - Sixty Special – 113.8 in (2,890 mm) wheelbase, V8
- 1998–2000
  - Escalade
- 1998–2004
  - Seville – 112.2 in (2,850 mm) wheelbase, V8

== 2000s ==
- 2000–2005 DeVille – 115.3 in (2,930 mm) wheelbase, V8
- 2002–2006 Escalade
  - 2002–2006 Escalade
  - 2003–2006 Escalade ESV
- 2003–2007 CTS
  - 2003–2013 CTS
  - 2004–2014 CTS-V Sedan
- 2004–2009 SRX
- 2004–2009 XLR
  - 2004–2009 XLR
  - 2006–2009 XLR-V
- 2005–2010 BLS (not sold in the United States)
- 2005–2011 STS
  - 2005–2011 STS – 116.4 in (2,960 mm) wheelbase
  - 2005–2009 STS-V – 116.4 in (2,960 mm) wheelbase
- 2006–2011 DTS – 115.6 in (2,940 mm) wheelbase, V8
- 2007–2014 Escalade
  - 2007–2014 Escalade
  - 2007–2014 Escalade ESV
  - 2009–2013 Escalade Hybrid hybrid SUV
  - 2002–2013 Escalade EXT pickup truck

== 2010s ==
- 2010–2016 SRX
- 2010–2019 CTS
  - 2010–2013 CTS Sport Wagon
  - 2011–2014 CTS Coupe
  - 2011–2014 CTS-V Sport Wagon
  - 2011–2015 CTS-V Coupe
  - 2014–2019 CTS Sedan
  - 2016–2019 CTS-V Sedan
- 2013–2019 ATS
  - 2013–2018 ATS Sedan
  - 2016–2018 ATS-V Sedan
  - 2015–2019 ATS Coupe
  - 2016–2019 ATS-V Coupe
- 2013–2019 XTS
- 2014 and 2016 ELR plug-in hybrid coupe
- 2015–2020 Escalade
  - 2015–2020 Escalade
  - 2015–2020 Escalade ESV

== 2020s ==
- 2016–2020 CT6 (North America)
  - 2016–2020 CT6
  - 2019–2020 CT6-V
- 2017–present XT5
- 2019–2025 XT4 (North America)
- 2020–2026 CT4
  - 2020–2026 CT4
  - 2020–2026 CT4-V
- 2020–present CT5
  - 2020–present CT5
  - 2020–present CT5-V
- 2020–present XT6
- 2021–present Cadillac Escalade
  - 2021–present Escalade
  - 2021–present Escalade ESV

== Racing cars ==
=== Sports Prototypes ===
Cadillac Northstar LMP	Cadillac Northstar LMP-01	Cadillac Northstar LMP-02	Cadillac DPi-V.R	Cadillac V-Series.R
2000	2001	2002	2017–2022	2023–present

=== Grand Tourers ===
Cadillac CTS-V.R Sedan	Cadillac CTS-V.R Coupe	Cadillac ATS-V.R
2004–2007	2011–2014	2015–2017

== Concepts and prototypes ==
- Caribbean
- Coupe de Ville – 1949
- El Rancho – 1949
- Embassy – 1949
- Debutante – 1950
- Custom roadster for Bill Boyer – 1951-52
- Eldorado and Townsman – 1952
- Le Mans – 1953
- Orleans – 1953
- El Camino – 1954
- La Espada – 1954
- Park Avenue – 1954
- PF 200 Cabriolet – 1954
- Celebrity – 1955
- Eldorado Brougham – 1955
- La Salle II Roadster and Sedan – 1955
- Eldorado St. Moritz – 1955
- Westchester – 1955
- Castilian
- Gala – 1956
- Maharani – 1956
- Palomino – 1956
- Eldorado Brougham – 1956
- Director – 1957
- "Bubble-Top" parade car – 1957
- "Rain Car" – 1958
- Eldorado Seville – 1958
- Skylight coupe/convertible – 1958
- Cyclone – 1959 (later rebodied)
- "Bubble-Top" parade car – 1959 (Note: Built in Canada.)
- Starlight – 1959
- 4-door phaeton – 1960
- Eldorado – 1961
- XP-715 La Salle – 1961
- Florentine – 1964
- XP-840 Eldorado Fastback – 1965
- NART Zagato – 1970
- TAG Function Car – 1978 (Note: a test vehicle on Eldorado chassis by Swiss coach builder, Franco Sbarro.)
- Cimarron PPG – 1985
- Voyage – 1988
- Solitaire – 1989
- Aurora – 1990
- LSE – 1994
- Evoq – 1999
- Steinmetz Catera – 1999
- Imaj – 2000
- Vizon – 2001
- Cien – 2002
- Sixteen – 2003
- BLS and Villa – 2005
- Provoq – 2008
- CTS Coupe – 2008
- Converj (PHEV) – 2009
- World Thorium Fuel (WTF) – 2009
- XTS Platinum – 2010
- Aera – 2010
- Urban Luxury Concept – 2010
- Ciel – 2011
- Elmiraj – 2013
- Escala – 2016
- Celestiq – 2020
- Lyriq – 2020
- Openspace – 2021
- Social Space – 2021
- InnerSpace – 2022
- GTP Hypercar Concept – 2022
- Personal Space
- Sollei – 2024
- Opulent Velocity – 2024
- V-One – 2026
