= Cadillac Model D =

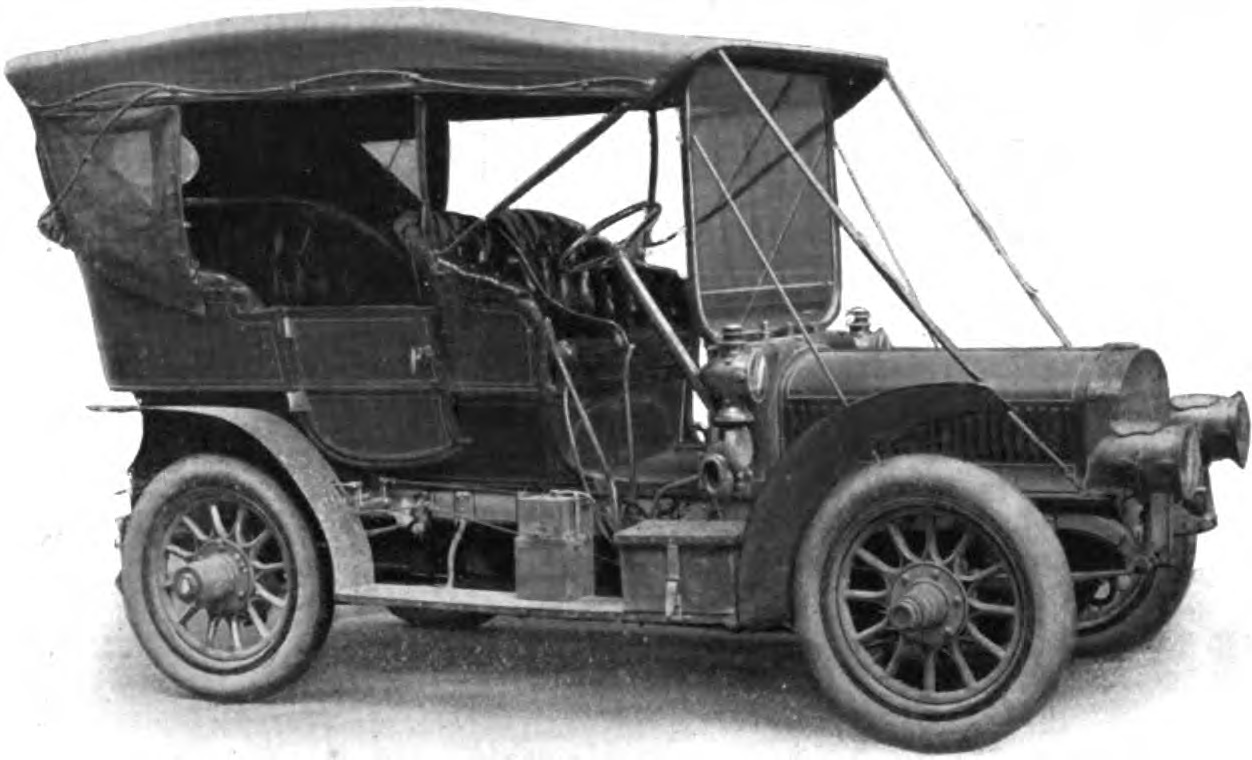
Model D 1905

The Cadillac Model D is an American brass age car that was introduced by Cadillac in January 1905, and sold throughout that year. It was a larger automobile than previous Cadillac offerings, and their first four-cylinder production model. Priced at $2800 ($100,333 in 2025 dollars), it can be seen as the first luxury car from the company.

The engine was a 300.7 in³ (4.9 L) four-cylinder L-head design producing a claimed 30 hp (22 kW). The car used a complicated 3-speed planetary transmission and had a governed throttle, essentially a primitive cruise control. The engine was designed by Alanson Partridge Brush, who left Cadillac shortly afterwards.

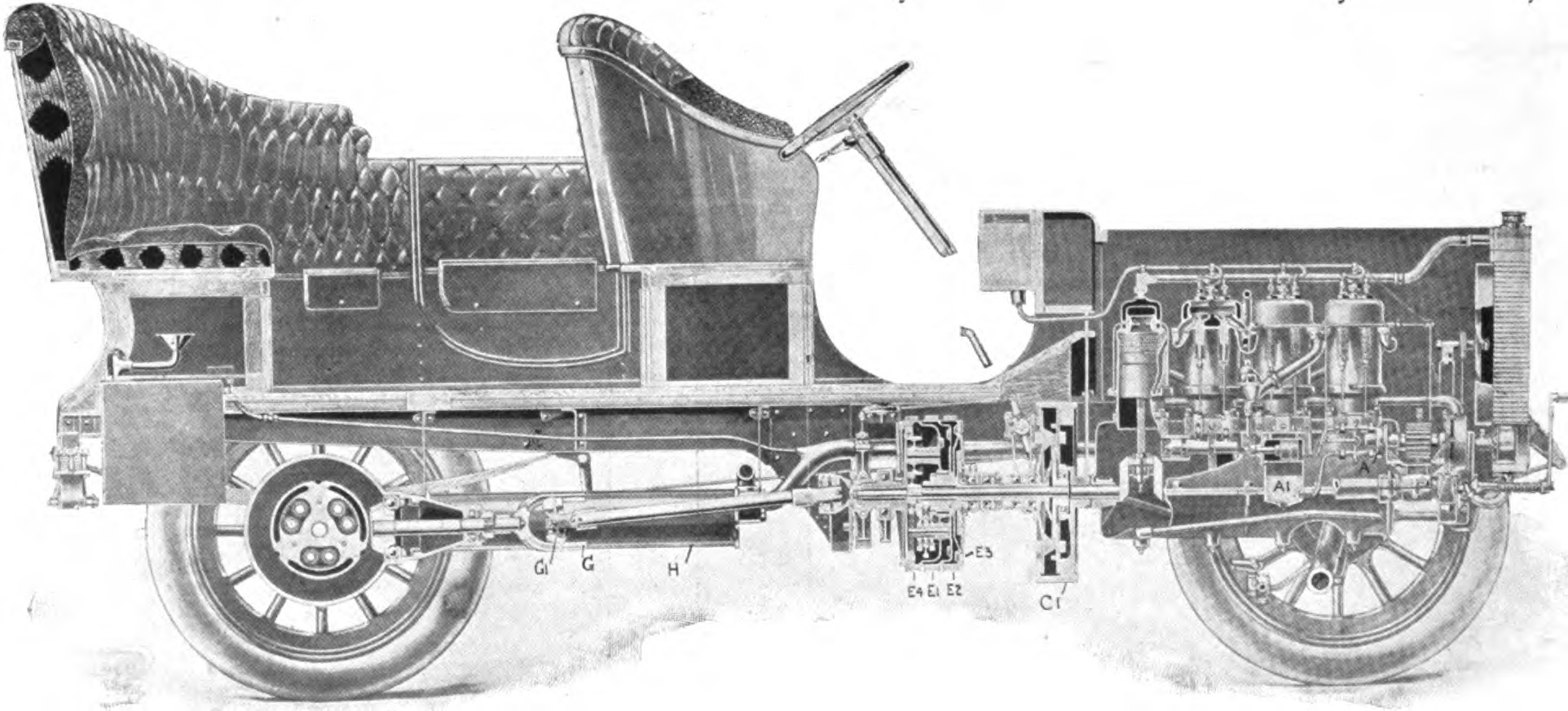
Cross-section

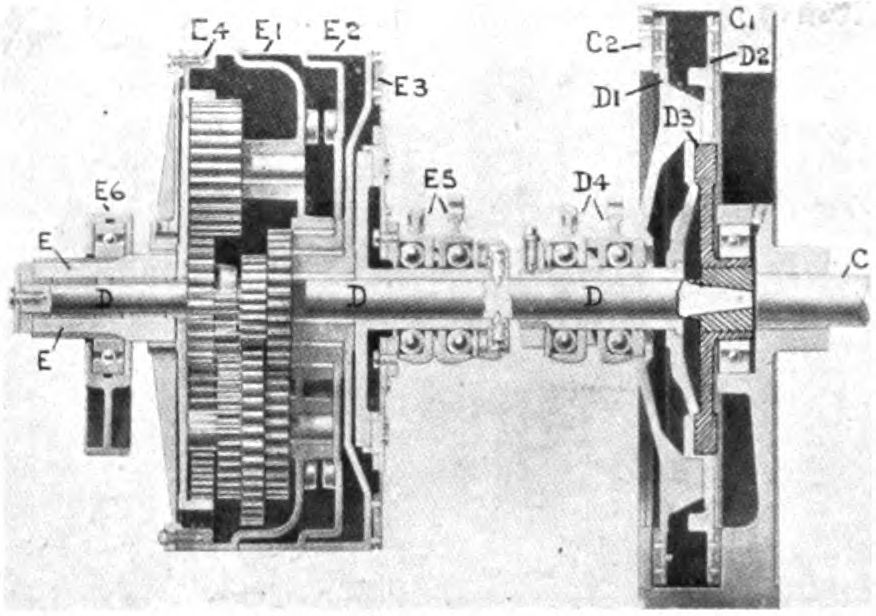
Planetary transmission, clutch

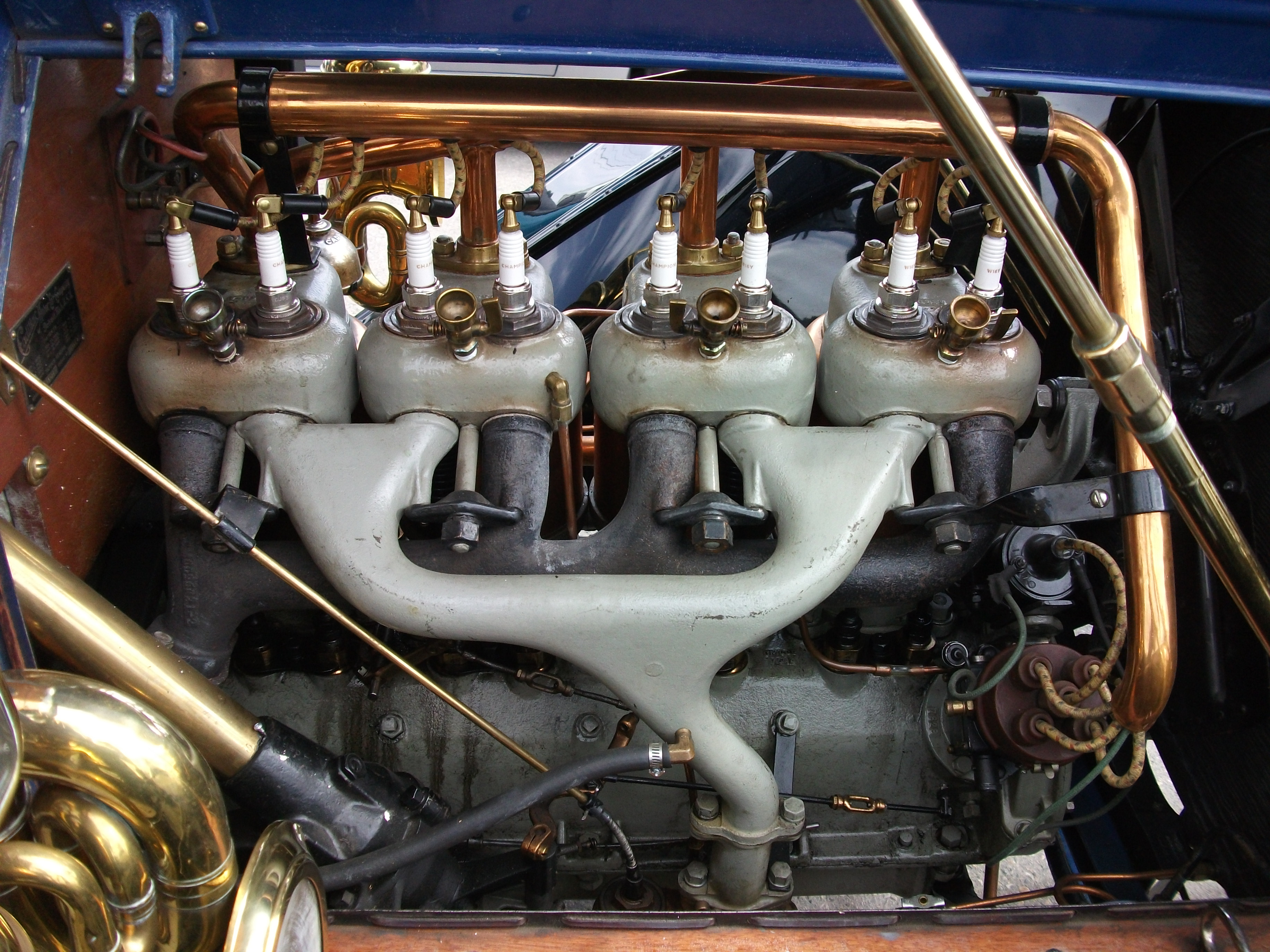
(Model 30) engine

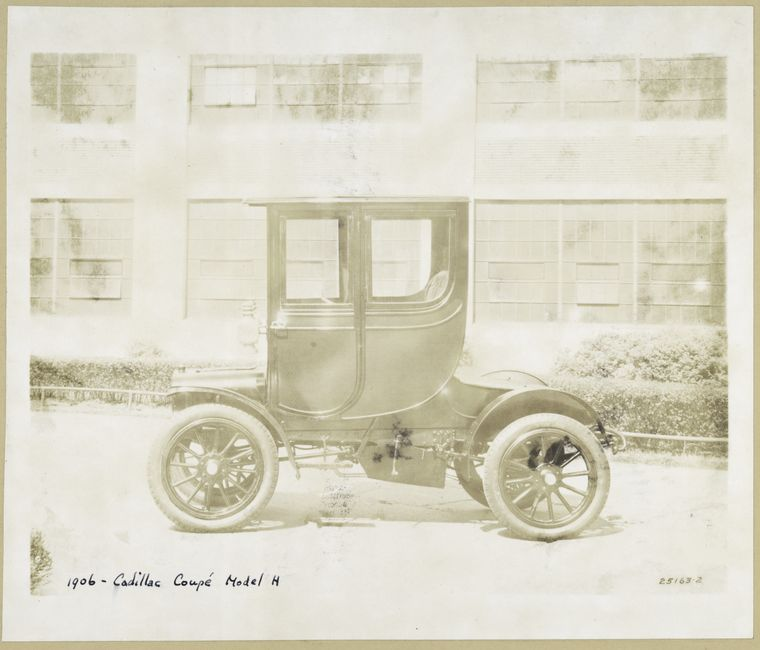
Model M Coupé 1907 Cadillac's first coupé

== Model H & L ==
The Model D was replaced for 1906 with the Model H and larger Model L. Both were based on the Model D, though the departure of Brush led Henry Leland to begin to purge his patented designs from the cars. Thus, the variable intake valve lift system and hydraulic governor were abandoned for more conventional designs.

The Model L used a large 392.7 in³ (6.4 L) engine with 5 in (127 mm) square bore and stroke, rated at 40 hp (30 kW). The smaller Model H continued with the 30 hp (22 kW) 300.7 in³ (4.9 L) engine size used in the Model D.

Both came in two or more body styles.

The Model H continued in production through 1908, while the Model L was cancelled, and a Limousine was added as a body style.

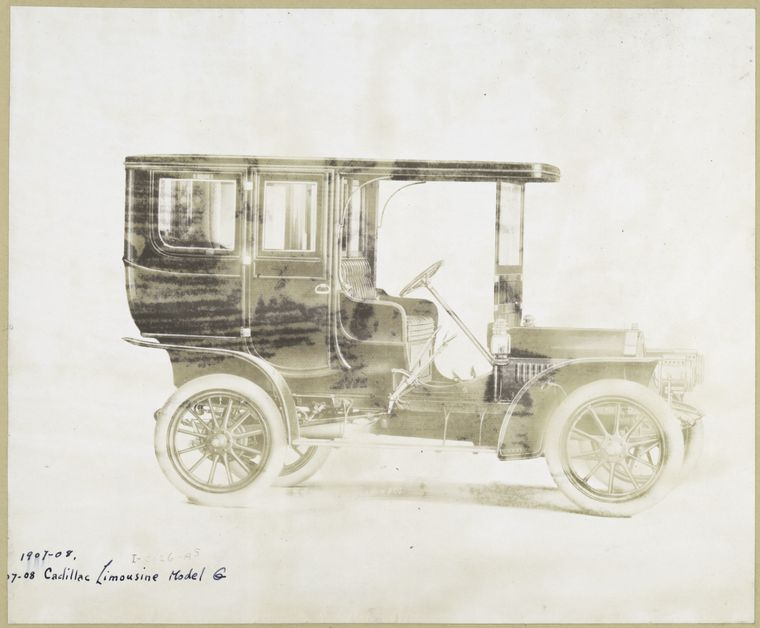
Model G limousine 1907

== Model G ==
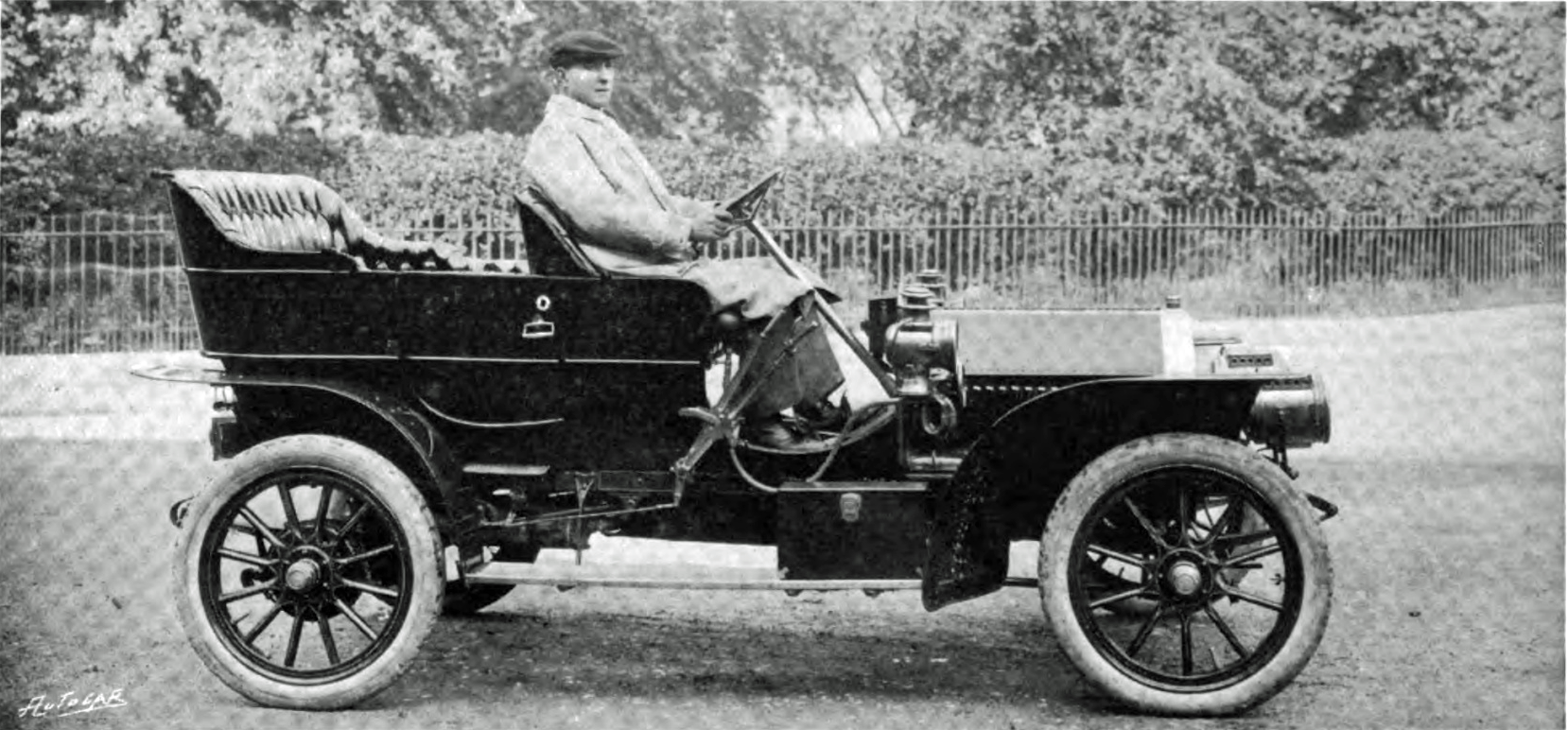
Model G side entrance tonneau

The Model G was a smaller version of the Model H, with a wheelbase of 100 in (2540 mm). It could be purchased as a tourer, roadster or limousine.

The engine was a 4" x 4½" 226.2 in³ (3.7 L) four-cylinder L-head design producing 20 hp (15 kW), which was re-rated to 25 for 1908 with no changes made. The Model G eschewed the complicated planetary transmission used on other luxury four-cylinder cars of the era for a less-complicated sliding gear system.

For the 1909 model year, Cadillac introduced the new Model Thirty. This new car was based on the Model G and replaced all 1908 Models. The Model 30 was bodied in various configurations and passenger capacities.

See List of Cadillac models
