= Cadillac Imaj =

Concept car developed by Cadillac

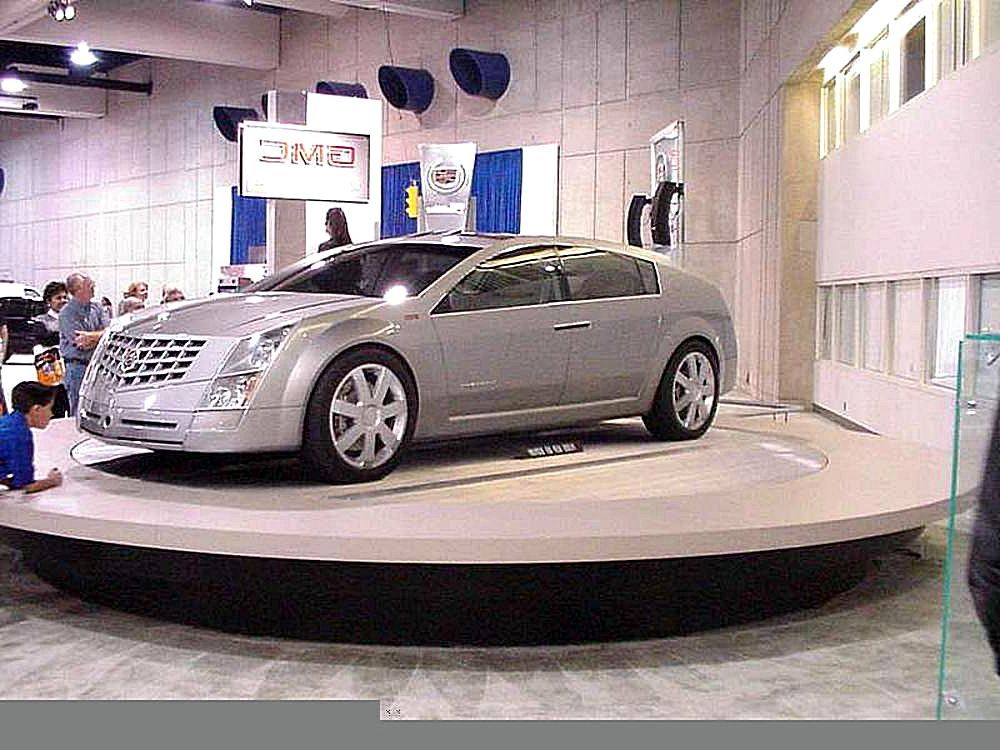

Overview
- Manufacturer: Cadillac (General Motors)
- Production: 2000

Body and chassis
- Class: Concept car
- Body style: 4-door liftback
- Layout: Front-engine, four-wheel-drive layout
- Related: Cadillac Evoq

Powertrain
- Engine: 4.2 L supercharged Northstar V8
- Transmission: 5-speed automatic

Dimensions
- Length: 5,100 mm (200.8 in)
- Width: 1,900 mm (74.8 in)
- Height: 1,420 mm (55.9 in)

The Cadillac Imaj is a concept car that was unveiled by Cadillac at the Geneva Motor Show in 2000. The luxurious liftback continued Cadillac's idea of the design Art and Science-design concept. It continued the sharp edges of the Evoq concept, unveiled a year earlier.

== Features ==
=== Interior and technology ===
==== Infotainment and display ====
The infotainment system featured a Delphi system using IBM ThinkPads and monitors for provide the internet, fax, navigation and services. An in-dashboard LCD screens were built for passengers and include a dual-function head-up display.

==== Safety and security ====
It features multiple high technology safety and security equipment including fingerprint-based biometric security, night vision, driving aids, radar parking alerts and adaptive cruise control.

==== Comfort ====
The interior features a "first-class" seating with ventilated front and rear seats, articulating footrests for rear seats and adjustable pedals.

==== Accessories ====
The interior also featured luxury accessories including all aluminium baggage and a fine clock from Bvlgari.

== Specifications ==
The Imaj was powered by a 4.2 L 32-valve supercharged Northstar V8 engine producing 425 hp (312.5 kW). A 5-speed automatic transmission was coupled to an all-wheel-drive setup. It came equipped with a StabiliTrak active suspension, Brembo brakes and Goodyear EMT run-flat tires.
