= General Motors C platform (RWD) =

GM C platform (RWD)
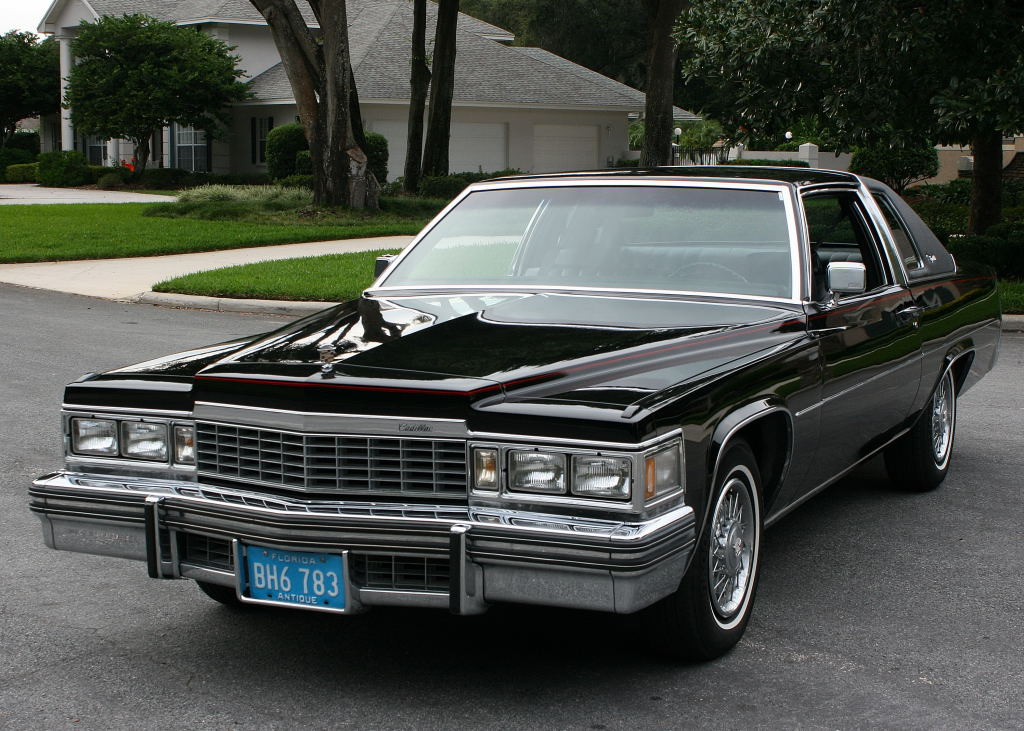
- 1977 Cadillac Coupe Deville

Overview
- Manufacturer: General Motors
- Production: 1925–1984

Body and chassis
- Class: Full-size car
- Layout: FR layout
- Related: GM D platform GM B platform

The GM C Platform was a rear wheel drive (RWD) automobile chassis used by General Motors for its full-sized cars from 1925 through 1984. From at least 1941, when the B-body followed suit in adopting the C-body's pioneering lower and wider bodystyle, abandoning running boards, it may be viewed as a larger and more upscale brother to the GM B platform. It was also related to the limousine D platform.

With the introduction of a severely downsized front-wheel drive new GM C platform in 1985, it was redesignated as GM's D platform and continued in production for a number of Cadillac models through 1996.

Among the earlier models the C-body was used for were the Pontiac Series 24/29 Torpedo, Oldsmobile 98, the Buick Roadmaster, Super and 1958 Limited, the LaSalle Series 52, and all mid-level Cadillacs starting with the Cadillac Series 355.

Generally the C-Body was for the top-of-the-line models of multiple General Motors divisions including the Oldsmobile 98 and Buick Electra, and the base model for multiple Cadillacs, including the Series 6200 Calais, the Series 6300 de Ville, the Series 6400 Eldorado, the Series 6000 Fleetwood Sixty Special and the Fleetwood Brougham.

== Use ==
Years	Model	Next platform
1925–1930	Cadillac Type V-63	-
1930–1935	Cadillac Series 355	-
1936	Cadillac Series 80	-
1936–1937	Cadillac Series 70	-
1937–1938	Cadillac Series 65	-
1940–1964	Cadillac Series 62	-
1942–1976	Cadillac Sixty Special (stretched for most of its existence)	GM C platform (FWD)
1948–1950	Cadillac Series 61	-
1959–1966	Cadillac Eldorado	GM E platform
1959–1984	Cadillac De Ville	GM C platform (FWD)
1965–1976	Cadillac Calais	-
1977–1984	Cadillac Fleetwood Brougham	GM D platform (1985)
1940	LaSalle Series 52	-
1936–1958	Buick Roadmaster	GM B platform
1940–1958	Buick Super	-
1958	Buick Limited	-
1959–1984	Buick Electra	GM C platform (FWD)
1971–1976	Buick Estate	GM B platform
1940–1984	Oldsmobile 90, 96 and 98	GM C platform (FWD)
1971–1976	Oldsmobile Custom Cruiser	GM B platform
1940–1941	Pontiac Series 24/29 Torpedo	-
1971–1976	full-sized Pontiac Safari, and Pontiac Grand Safari	GM B platform
1971–1976	Chevrolet Townsman/Brookwood/Kingswood/Kingswood Estate	GM B platform

== See also ==
- List of General Motors platforms
