= Cadillac Model Thirty =

Car introduced in 1909

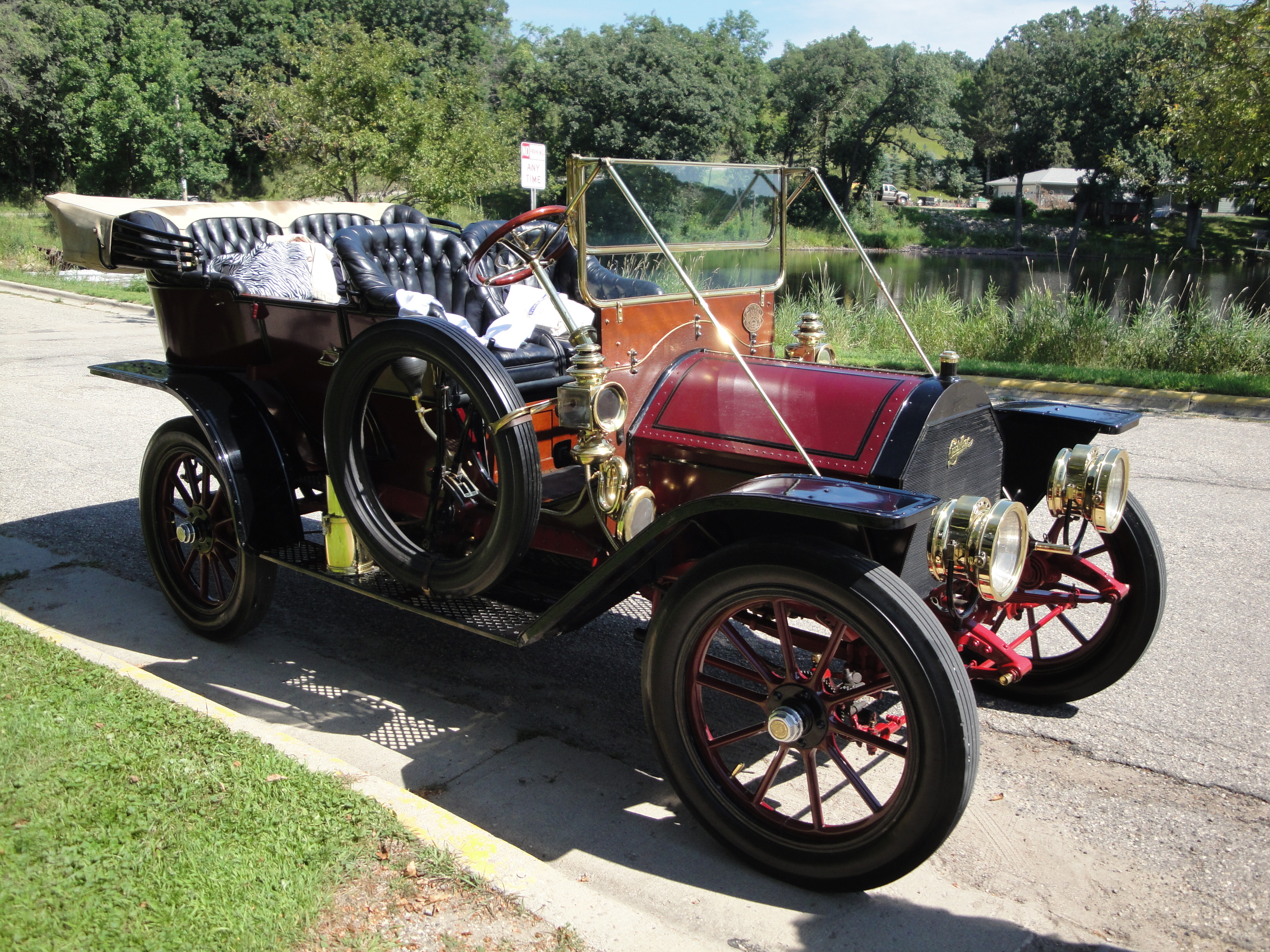
Cadillac Model 30 1908 tourer

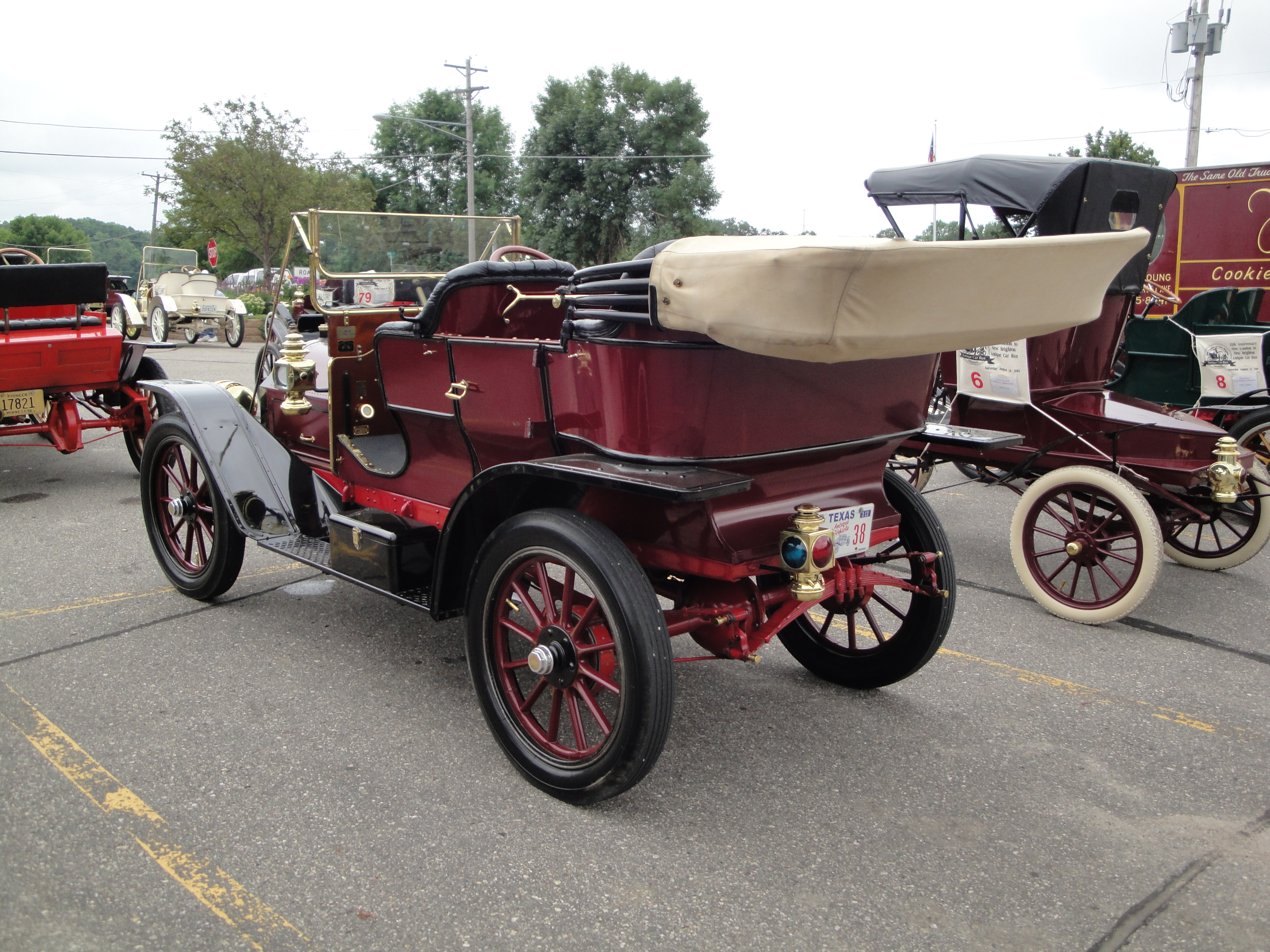
Rear view of 1908 tourer

The Cadillac Model Thirty was an American automobile introduced in December 1909 by the Cadillac Division of General Motors, and sold through 1911. It was the company's only model for those years and was based on the 1907 Model G. The 1912 Model 1912, 1913 Model 1913, and 1914 Model 1914 were similar, but used larger engines. This platform used Cadillac's 226.2 cu in (3.7 L) L-head four-cylinder engine. The 1912 Model 30 was the first production car to have an electric starter rather than a hand crank, spring, or other early method.

The Model Thirty was replaced in 1915 by the Cadillac Type 51, Cadillac's first V8 vehicle.

== Engine and bodies ==
The 1910 model was available with a closed body, the first time a US automobile manufacturer had offered this type.

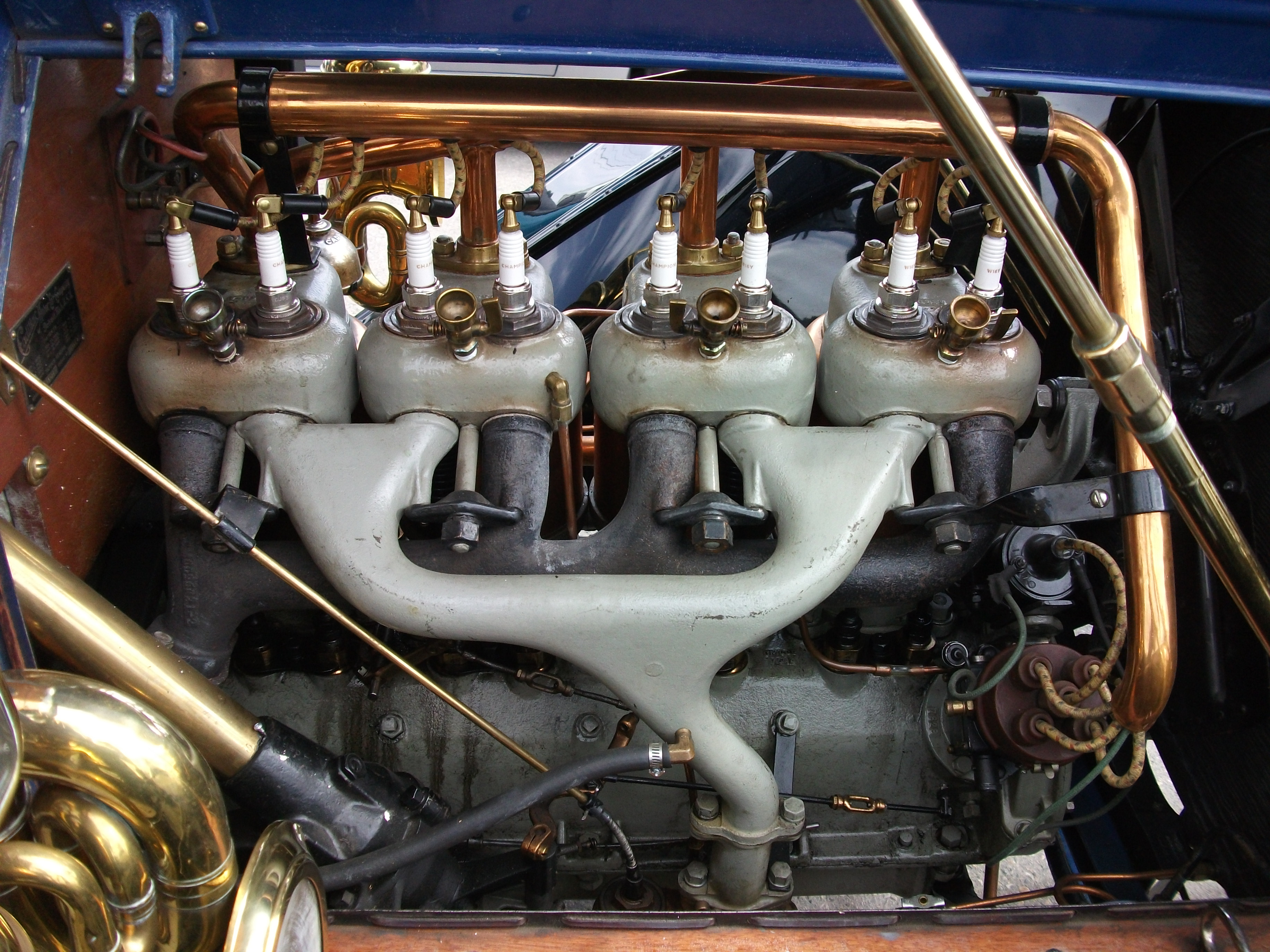
1911 Type 30 engine

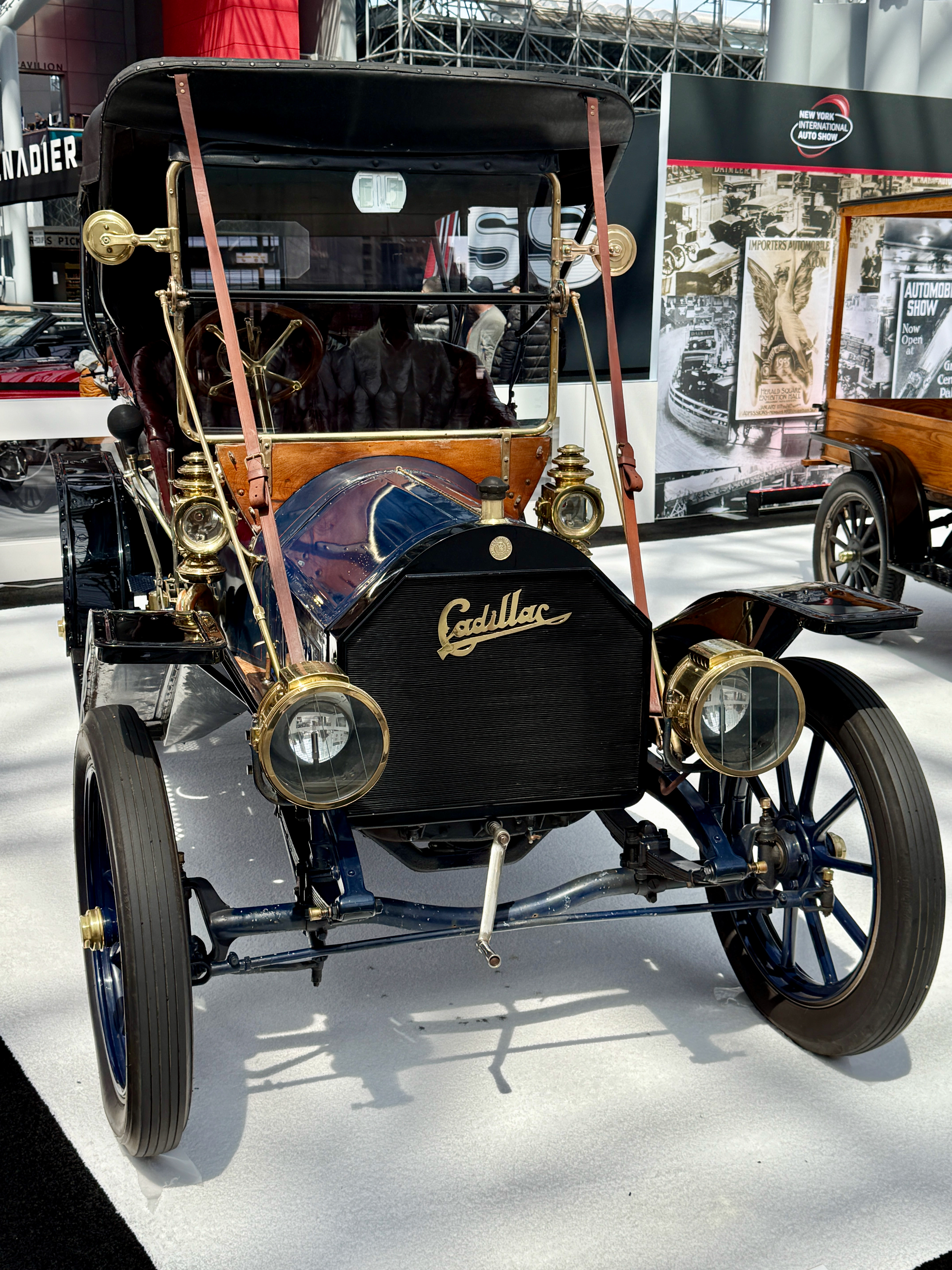
Front view of 1909 model

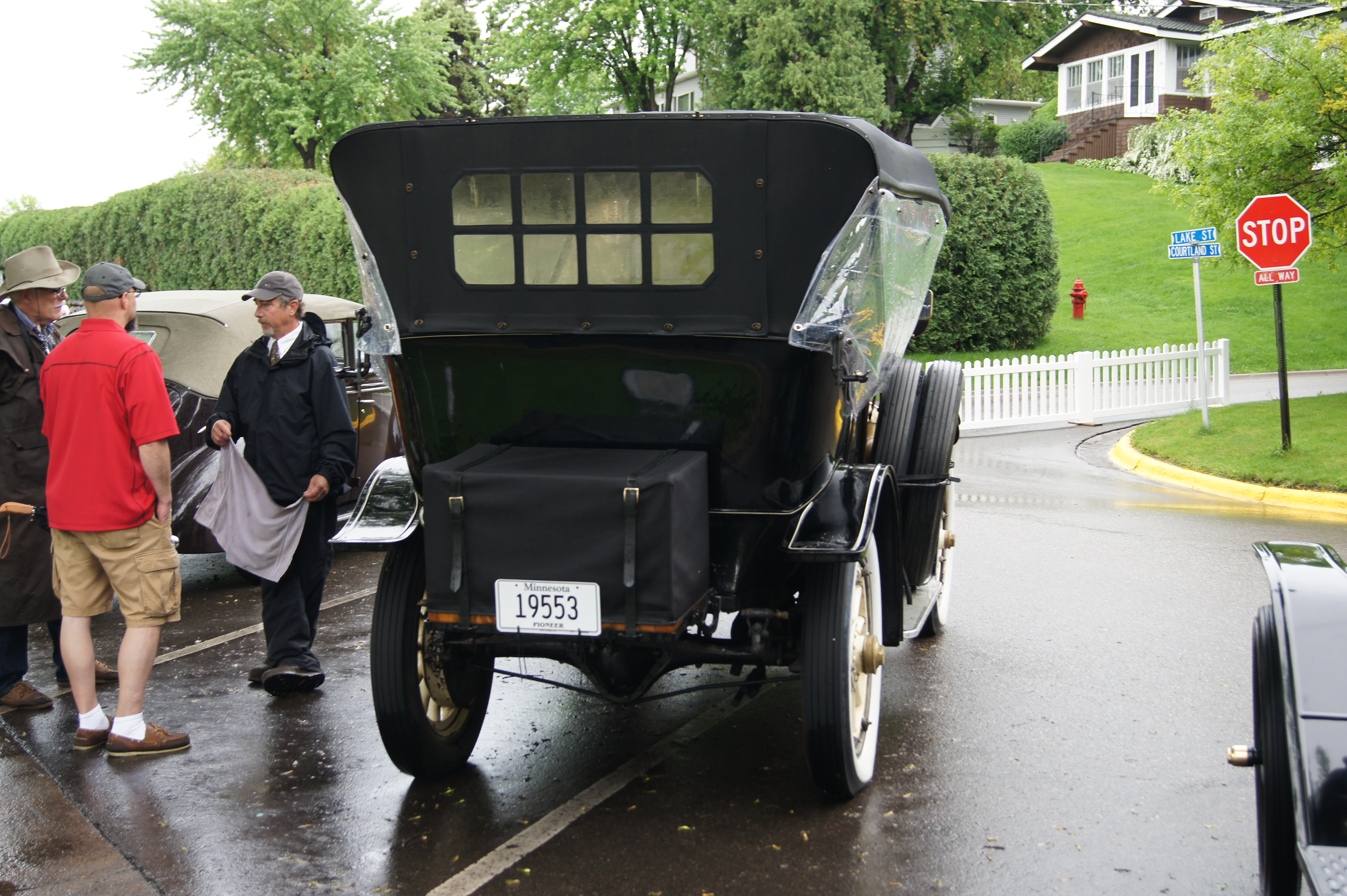
Rear view of 1912 model

The engine was the same 226.2 cu in (3.7 L) four-cylinder L-head design used in the Model G, and that model's simple sliding-gear transmission was also adopted. The engine was bored out to 255.4 in³ (4.2 L) for 1910 and 286.3 in³ (4.7 L) for 1911 and 1912. The engine was reworked with a longer stroke for 1913, giving 365.8 in³ (6.0 L) of displacement. This same engine served in 1914.

== Self starter ==
The 1912 model was awarded the Dewar Trophy for its electrical system, including its electric starter.
