= Cadillac Calais =

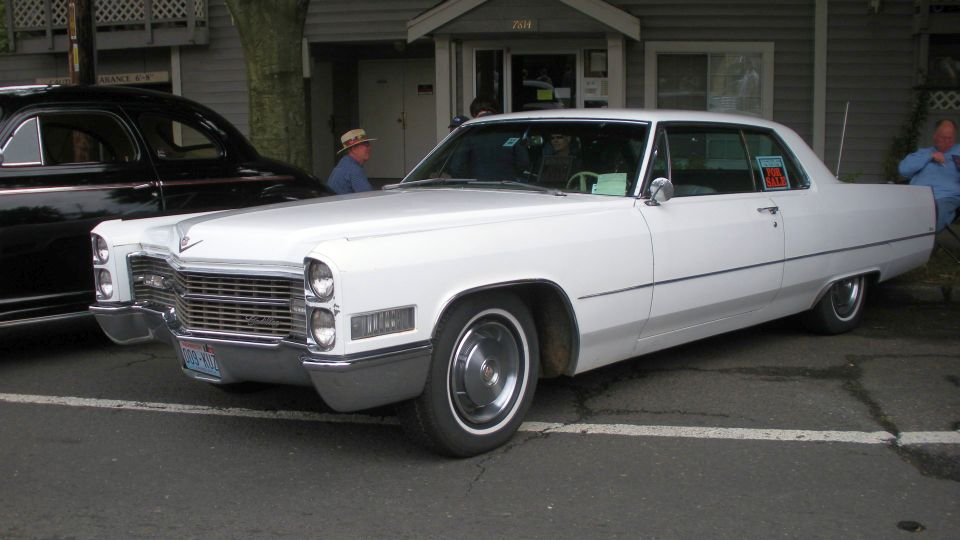
- 1966 Cadillac Calais Coupe

Overview
- Manufacturer: Cadillac
- Production: 1965–1976
- Designer: Bill Mitchell

Body and chassis
- Class: Full-size luxury car
- Layout: FR layout
- Platform: C-body

Chronology
- Predecessor: Cadillac Series 62
- Successor: Cadillac Seville

The Cadillac Calais is an automobile produced by Cadillac from 1965 to 1976. The Division renamed its entry-level Series 62 as the "Calais" in 1965, after the French port city, derived from the Greek mythological figure Calais. The Calais was identical in styling and mechanics to the better-equipped, more expensive Cadillac de Ville. No convertible model was offered in the Calais line.

The Calais name would be reused for future models of other GM divisions: the Oldsmobile Cutlass Calais, Holden Calais (VE) and Holden Calais (VF).

== 1965–1970 ==
First generation
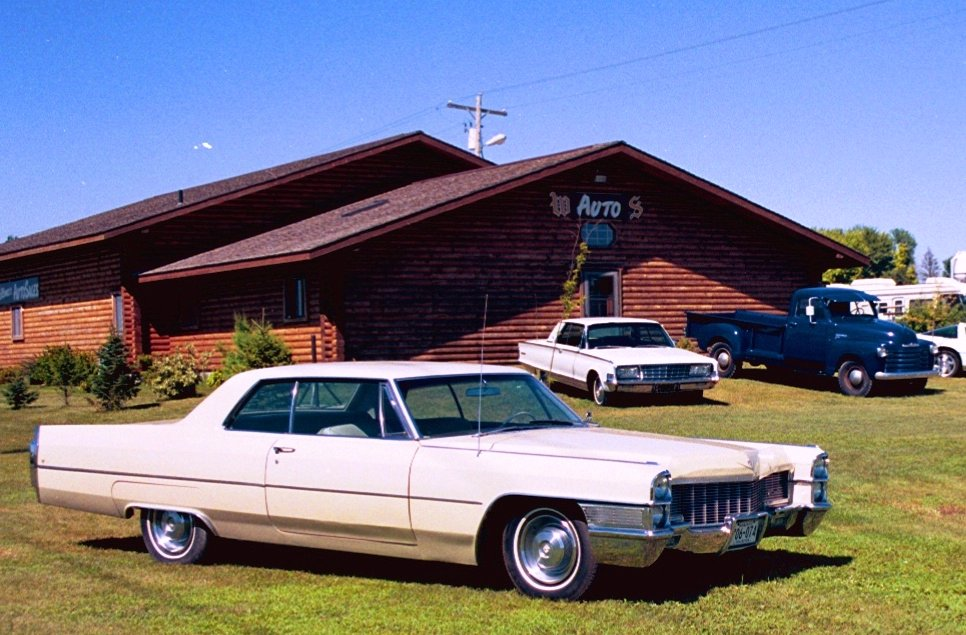
- 1965 Cadillac Calais Coupe

Overview
- Model years: 1965–1970
- Assembly: Detroit Assembly, Detroit, Michigan, United States

Body and chassis
- Body style: 4-door hardtop 4-door sedan 2-door hardtop
- Related: Cadillac Eldorado; Cadillac De Ville; Buick Electra; Oldsmobile 98

Powertrain
- Engine: 429 cu in (7.0 L) OHV V8; 472 cu in (7.7 L) OHV V8
- Transmission: 3-speed TH-400, automatic

Dimensions
- Wheelbase: 129.5 in (3,289 mm)
- Length: 1965–67: 224.0 in (5,690 mm); 1968: 224.7 in (5,710 mm); 1969–70: 225.0 in (5,715 mm)
- Width: 1965–68: 79.9 in (2,029 mm); 1969–70: 79.8 in (2,027 mm)
- Height: 1965–68: 55.6 in (1,412 mm); 1969–70: 56.2 in (1,427 mm)
- Curb weight: 4,600–4,900 lb (2,100–2,200 kg)

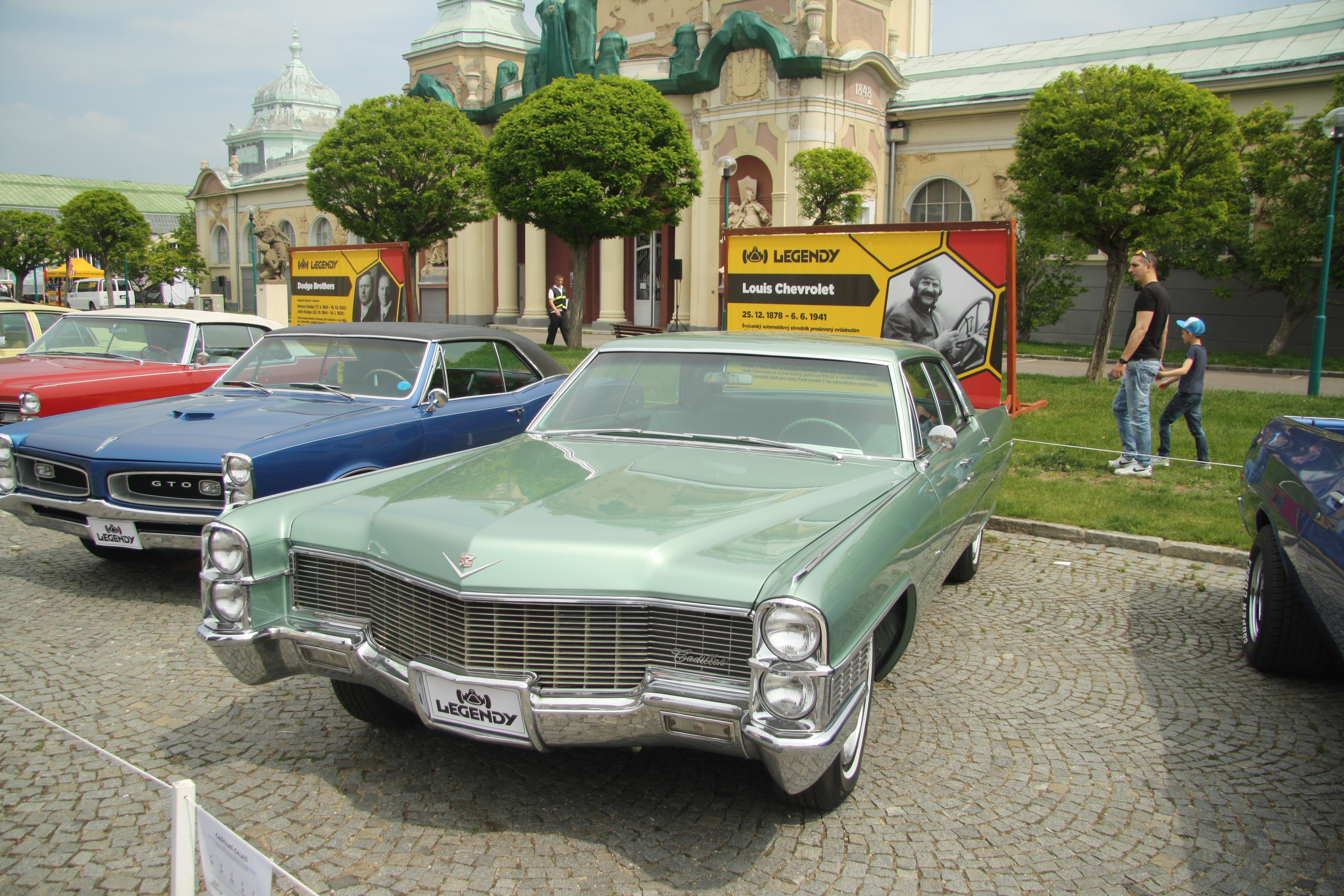
1965 Cadillac Calais Hardtop Sedan

In 1965, Calais tailfins were canted slightly downward, and sharp, distinct body lines were featured. The rear bumper was straight and the rear lamp clusters were vertical. The headlight pairs were vertical, permitting a wide grille. Side windows were curved and frameless. Perimeter frame construction allowed positioning of the engine forward in the frame, thus lowering the transmission hump and increasing interior room. Like the De Ville, the Calais was available as a 2- or 4-door hardtop as well as a "formal-roof" 4-door sedan, which was a hybrid with frameless, hardtop-like windows, but with a pillar between them.

The primary differences between the Calais and the De Ville were trim levels and standard equipment. While the De Ville was delivered with such standard amenities as AM/FM radio, power windows, and 2-way power seats, the Calais had hand-cranked windows and manual seat adjusters as standard, with the radio and power windows being US$165 ($1,686 in 2025 dollars) in 1965 and US$119 options ($1,216 in 2025 dollars) in 1965, respectively. Other standard equipment on the Calais included power brakes; power steering; automatic transmission; cornering lights; dual back-up lights; windshield washers and dual speed wipers; full wheel covers; remote controlled outside rear view mirror; visor vanity mirror; oil filter; five tubeless blackwall tires; heater; defroster; lamps for glove and rear passenger compartments and front and rear seat belts.

Unlike the De Ville, the Calais did not offer leather seating areas and vinyl roof trim was not offered initially. A high-grade cloth and vinyl, similar to what was seen on top-line GM C platform-based Buick Electras and Oldsmobile 98s, was standard. Another item not initially available on the Calais was the Cadillac-exclusive "firemist" paint, an extra-cost high gloss metallic paint.

Cadillac, always General Motors' technology leader, offered most De Ville options on the Calais, such as Twilight Sentinel and the GuideMatic headlight dimmer. In 1965, the new Turbo-Hydramatic automatic transmission, standard on the 1964 De Ville, but not the lower-priced Series 62, became standard throughout the Cadillac line, including the Calais. The 340 hp (254 kW) 429 cu in (7.0 L) V8 also remained the standard engine.

Pricing of the Cadillac Calais started at just under US$5,000 ($51,082 in 2025 dollars), almost US$1,000 ($10,216 in 2025 dollars) (or about 25%) more than the Electra 225 and Oldsmobile 98, and about US$500 ($5,108 in 2025 dollars) more than the top-line Buick Riviera.

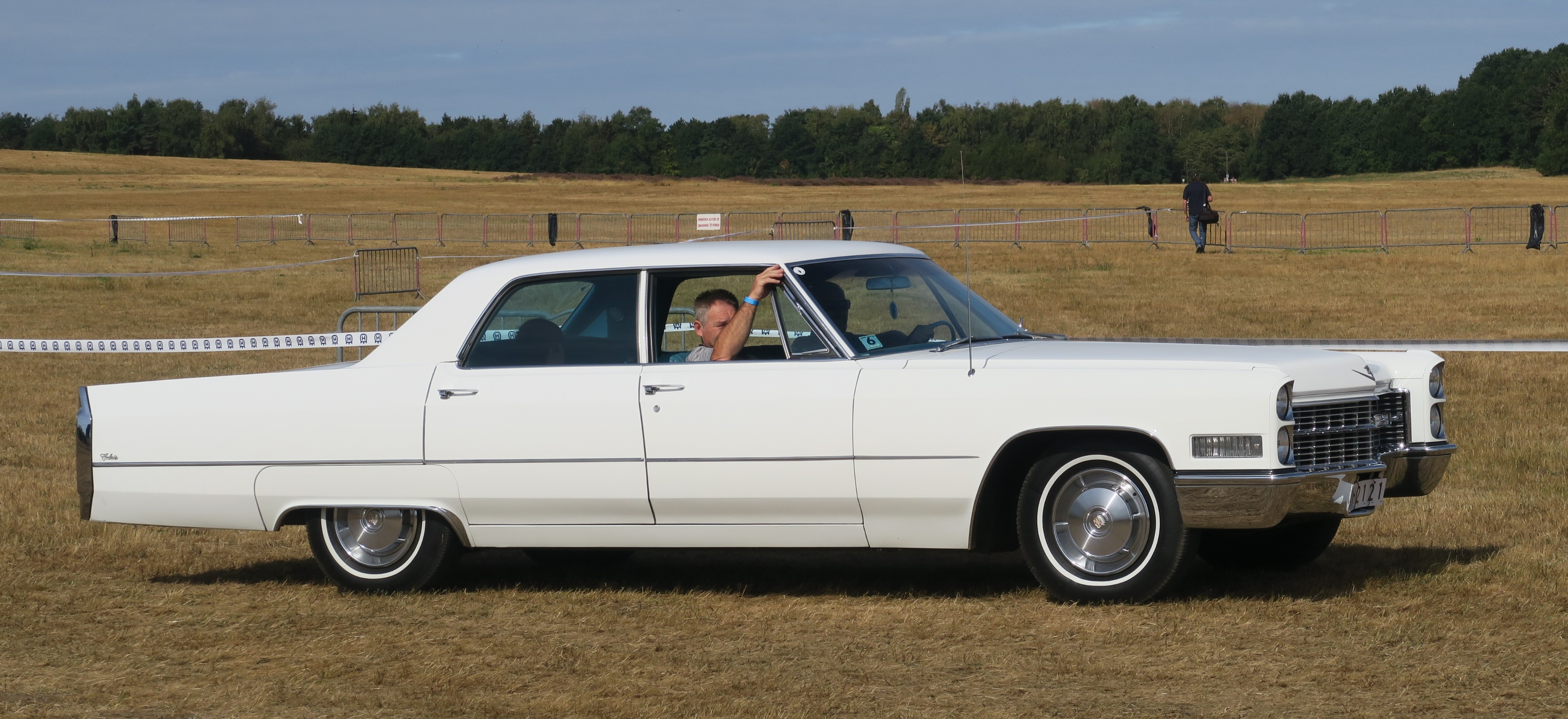
1966 Cadillac Calais Sedan

In 1966, changes included a somewhat coarser mesh for the radiator grille insert, which was became divided by a thick, bright metal horizontal center bar housing rectangular parking lamps at the outer ends. Separate rectangular side marker lamps replaced the integral grille extension designs. There was generally less chrome on all Cadillac models this year. Cadillac "firsts" this season included variable ratio steering and optional front seats with carbon cloth heating pads built into the cushions and seatbacks. Comfort and convenience innovations were headrests, reclining seats and an AM/FM stereo system. Automatic level control was available. Engineering improvements made to the perimeter frame increased ride and handling ease. Newly designed piston and oil rings and a new engine mounting system and patented quiet exhaust were used. Head rests became an option.

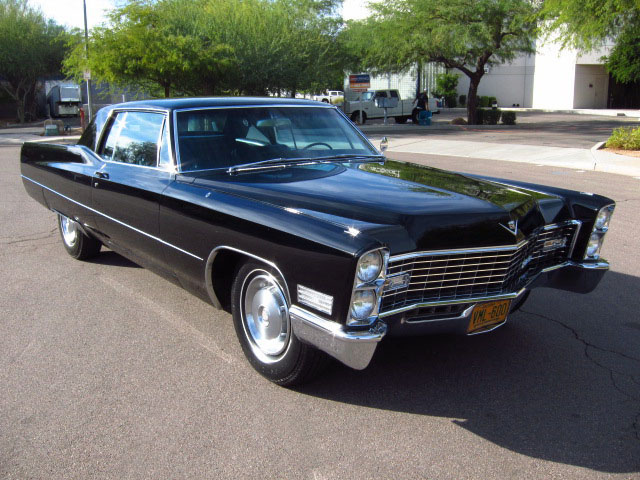
1967 Cadillac Calais Coupe

The Calais was extensively restyled for 1967. Prominent styling features were given a powerful frontal appearance with "forward-leaning" front end, long sculptured body lines, and redefined rear fenders that had more than just a hint of tail fins in them. The full-width forward-thrust "eggcrate" grille was flanked by dual stacked headlights for the third consecutive year. The squarer cornered grille insert had blades that seemed to emphasize its vertical members and it appeared both above the bumper and through a horizontal slot cut into it. Rectangular parking lamps were built into the outer edges of the grille. Rear end styling revisions were highlighted by metal divided taillamps and a painted lower bumper section. For 1967, power windows became standard on the Calais line, although power seats were still optional even in the 1970s models. Coupes got a new roofline, inspired by the Florentine show car created for the 1964 New York World's Fair, that gave rear seat passengers added privacy. As on that show car, the quarter window glass retracted rearward into a sail panel. New standard Calais features included non-glare rear-view mirror, electric clock, Automatic Climate Controls, padded dashboard, Hazard Warning system, outboard seatbelt retractors and rear cigarette lighters in all styles. A slide-out fuse box and safety front seat back lock for two-door models were additional Cadillac advances for the 1967 model year. Technical improvements included a revised engine valve train, different carburetor, Mylar printed circuit instrument panel, re-tuned body mounts, and a new engine fan with clutch for quieter operation. An energy absorbing steering column became optional. 1967 was the last model year for pillared sedans.

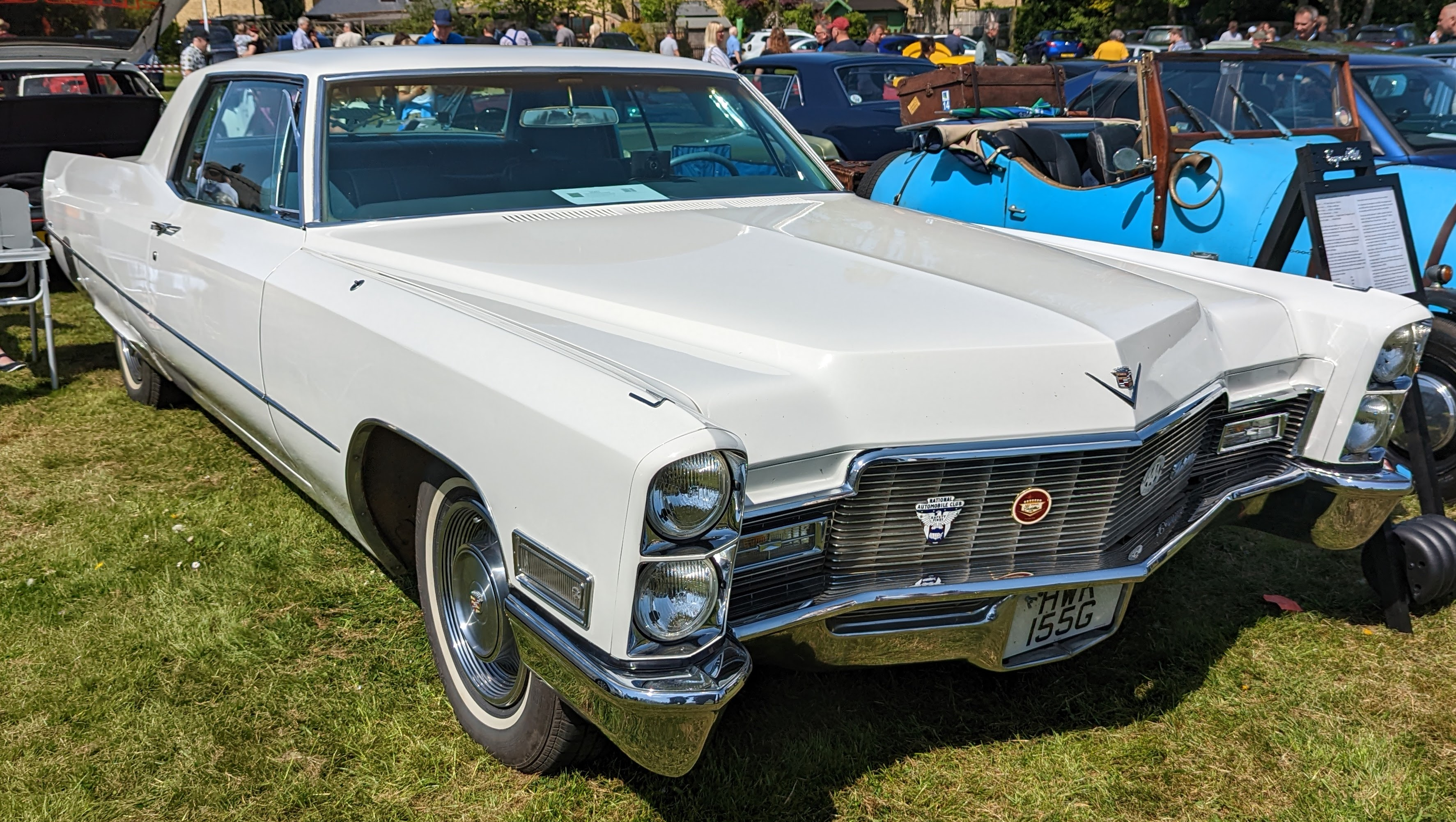
1968 Cadillac Calais Coupe

For 1968, grilles had an insert with finer mesh and step down outer section which held the rectangular parking lights slightly higher than before. Front and rear side marker lights were mandatory, beginning this year. Rear end styling was modestly altered with the deck lid having more of a rake. The hood was re-designed to accommodate recessed windshield wiper-washers, which became three speed as standard. Of 20 exterior paint color combinations, 14 were totally new. On the inside, enriched appointments included molded inner door panels with illuminated reflectors and a selection of 147 upholstery combinations, 76 in cloth, 67 in leather and four in vinyl. New standard features included a Light Group, a Mirror Group, a trip odometer and an ignition key warning buzzer. Like all other Cadillacs, the Calais received the 472 cu in (7.7 L) OHV V8 in 1968. 1968 was also the last year for the "stacked" dual headlights, which were replaced with horizontal dual headlights in 1969. 1968 was also the last year for vent windows. Shoulder belts became standard for both driver and right front passenger seating positions on all Cadillacs (except convertibles) built effective January 1, 1968.

In 1969, the Calais was restyled. A new front fender treatment similar to the Eldorado helped to emphasize a stronger horizontal design line. Rear quarters were extended to give the car a longer look. Dual horizontal headlamps were positioned in the outboard step down areas of the all-new grille. The roofline was squarer and the rear deck and bumper more sculptured. A new ventilation system eliminated the need for vent windows, which provided a longer sleeker look and improved visibility. New standard features included front center seat armrests. Front seat headrests were mandatory and the ignition switch was moved from the instrument panel to the steering column, which locked both the steering wheel and transmission selector lever when the key was removed.

In 1970, a facelift included a new grille with 13 vertical blades set against a delicately cross-hatched rectangular opening. The bright metal headlamp surrounds were bordered with body color to give a more refined look. Narrow vertical taillamps were seen again and had smaller bottom lenses extending downward in the bumper. Standard wheel covers and winged crest fender tip emblems were new. Exterior distinctions came from a Calais signature script above the rear end of the horizontal belt molding just ahead of the taillight dividers and from the use of small square back-up light lenses set into the lower bumper as opposed to the long rectangular lenses used on the De Ville. The Cadillac crest on the hood and decklid was slightly larger and the traditional 'V' emblem beneath the crest was removed from both the Calais and De Ville this year, not to return until 1972.

== 1971–1976 ==
Second generation
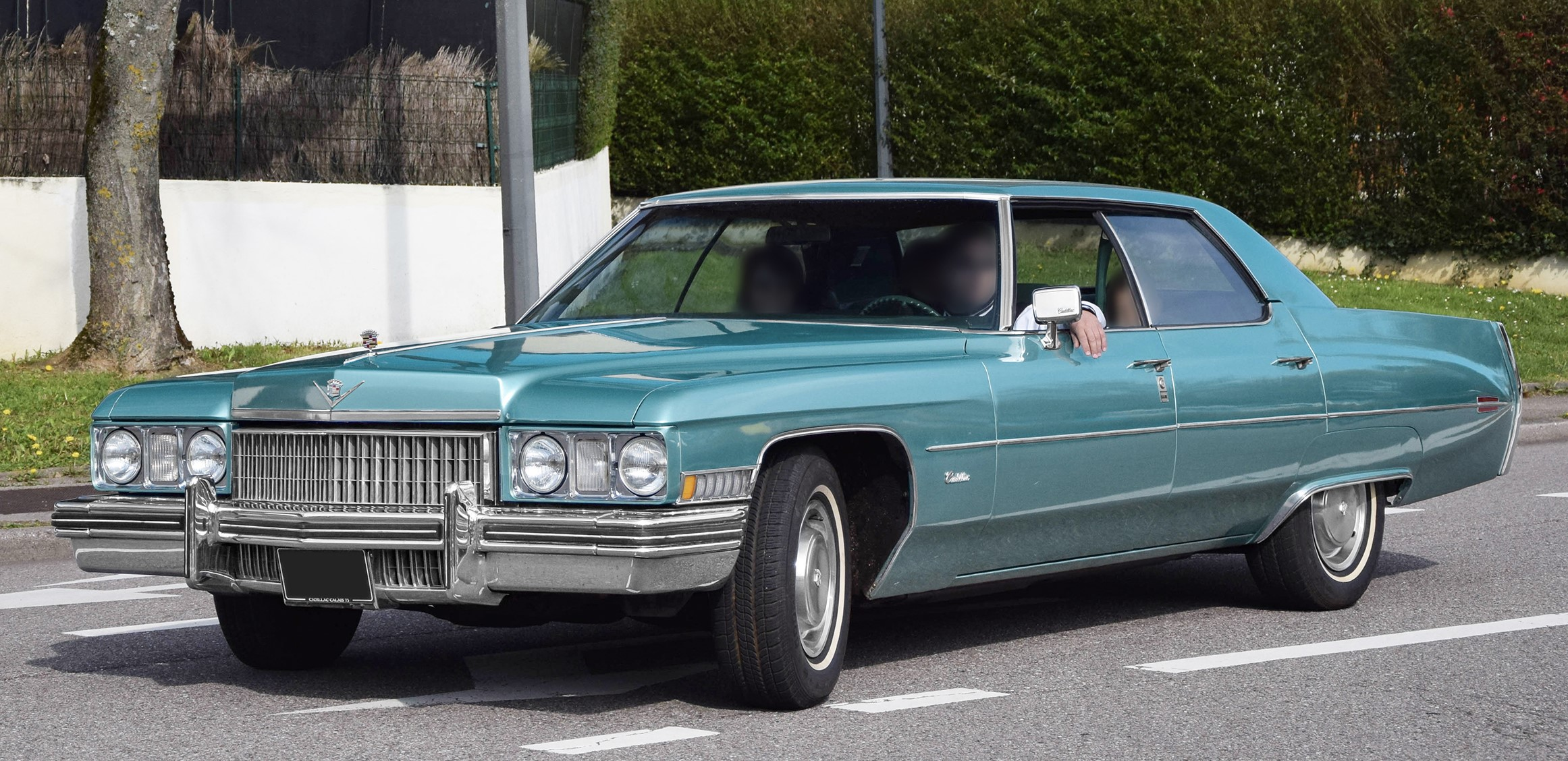
- 1973 Cadillac Calais Sedan

Overview
- Model years: 1971–1976
- Assembly: Detroit, Michigan, United States; Linden, New Jersey, United States

Body and chassis
- Body style: 4-door hardtop 2-door hardtop 2-door coupe
- Related: Cadillac De Ville; Buick Electra; Oldsmobile 98; Buick Estate

Powertrain
- Engine: 472 cu in (7.7 L) OHV V8; 500 cu in (8.2 L) OHV V8
- Transmission: 3-speed TH-400, automatic

Dimensions
- Wheelbase: 130.0 in (3,302 mm)
- Length: 1971: 225.8 in (5,735 mm); 1972: 227.4 in (5,776 mm); 1973: 227.8 in (5,786 mm); 1974–76: 230.7 in (5,860 mm)
- Width: 79.8 in (2,027 mm)
- Height: 1971–73: 54.5 in (1,384 mm); 1974: 54.6 in (1,387 mm); 1975–76: 54.3 in (1,379 mm)
- Curb weight: 4,800–5,300 lb (2,200–2,400 kg)

For 1971, all Cadillac models including the Calais were completely restyled, inside and out. The new 1971 GM full-size bodies, at 64.3" front shoulder room (62.1" on Cadillac) and 63.4" rear shoulder room (64.0" on Cadillac) set a record for interior width that would not be matched by any car until the full-size GM rear-wheel drive models of the early to mid-1990s. Pairs of individually housed round headlamps were wider apart, with a winged Cadillac crest set between each pair. The V-shaped grille had an eggcrate style insert and was protected by massive vertical guards framing a rectangular license plate indentation. A wide hood with full-length windsplints, a prominent center crease and recessed windshield wipers was used. A larger Cadillac crest (again, minus the traditional 'V' emblem) decorated the hood face and new optional fiber-optic lamp indicators were placed atop each front fender. A horizontal beltline molding ran from behind the front wheel housing almost to the rear, stopping where an elliptical bulge in the body came to a point and where thin rectangular side markers were placed above and below the chrome strip. The rear wheel openings were again covered by fender skirts. New vertical taillamps were no longer divided by a chrome bar. Long horizontal back-up lamps were set in the bumper, on either side of a deeply recessed license plate housing. The Calais wheelbase was extended to 130 in (3,302 mm). Interiors were redesigned featuring a new curved instrument panel available with brushed aluminum trim. Revised seating areas featured either standard cloth or optional vinyl upholstery.

In 1972, a minor facelift placed more emphasis on horizontal grille blades. The parking lamps were moved from the bumper to between the square bezeled headlamps, which were now set wider apart. After a two year absence, the traditional 'V' emblem was restored to the hood and deck lid. New standard features included a bumper impact system, automatic parking brake release, passenger assist straps and flow through ventilation system.

Energy absorbing bumpers were new on all GM cars in 1973. Styling refinements to the Calais included a wider grille with an intricate eggcrate design. Larger vertical rectangles housed the parking lamps between wide spaced headlamps which had square bezels but round lenses. Bumpers ran fully across the front and wrapped around each end. Vertical guards were spaced much further apart at a point outboard of the grille. The rear end had a bumper with a flatter upper section housing an angled license plate recess. Border outline moldings vertically "veed" paralleled the fender edge shape at the rear bodysides. Single horizontally mounted rectangular rear side marker lamps were placed over and under the rear tip of the thin beltline trim. 'Cadillac' script was seen on the front fender sides below the belt molding behind the wheel opening; 'Calais' script appeared on the lower right of the deck lid. Interior seating was revised this year, featuring standard cloth or optional vinyl upholstery. Also new were "soft-pillow" door panels with larger, sturdier pull-straps.

The 1974 Calais, De Ville and Fleetwood received a major facelift. A wider, eggcrate grille was used. Dual round headlamps were mounted close together in square bezels. Further outboard were double deck wraparound turn signal/parking lamps. Shorter vertical grille guards appeared in about the same position as before. Rear fender sides were flatter without the elliptical bulge. The thin beltline molding was positioned lower by several inches. The rear end had vertical chrome bumper ends with integrated side-marker lights. New horizontal taillamps and back-up lamps were positioned beneath the trunk lid. Both bumpers, especially the rear, protruded further from the body. Coupes were no longer hardtops, instead sporting large wide "coach" windows giving a thick center pillar look. All 1974 Cadillacs had a new, two-tiered, "space-aged" curved instrument panel that housed a new standard quartz controlled digital clock. Other standard features on the Calais included a removable litter receptacle and bias belted blackwall tires.

1974 also saw the introduction of the industry's first airbag system, the optional GM "Air Cushion Restraint System". This option provided dual airbag protection for front seat occupants in the case of a frontal collision. One airbag was located in the steering wheel hub, while the other was placed on the lower passenger side of the dashboard. To accommodate the passenger airbag, the glove compartment was replaced by a rectangular storage box, with a lockable wood-tone hinged front panel, located under the center of the dashboard. Additionally, there was a driver's side knee bolster panel with an ashtray to the right of the steering column and a small hinged-door storage compartment on the left side. Although the "ACRS" system (also available on top of the line Buick and Oldsmobile models) saved lives, the option was quite expensive and therefore unpopular with customers. It was discontinued after 1976 and Cadillac would not offer airbags again until the 1990 model year.

Styling changes for 1975 included a new hood with sharper lines; dual rectangular headlamps flanked by rectangular turn signal/parking lights wrapped around squared-off front fenders resulted in a more unified front-end appearance. A new cross hatched grille also appeared with Cadillac script on the header. Sedans now featured slim fixed triangular quarter windows. New standard equipment included the lamp monitor system, power door locks, high energy ignition and steel-belted radial tires. The big 500 cu in (8.2 L) engine, an Eldorado exclusive since 1970, was now standard in all Cadillacs except the new, smaller Seville. Vinyl seating areas were of the same configuration since 1973; Cloth upholstery was available in more colors.

In 1976, the grille saw a new finer crosshatching pattern. Cornering lamps received new horizontal silver trim, while taillamps bezels also gained chrome-like trim. Eight different color accent stripes were available. Optional padded vinyl roof coverings were now stamped with an Elk grain pattern. Vinyl seats were continued and new interior trim included plaids, plush velours and knits. Coupe models equipped with the available cabriolet vinyl top, covering the rear-half of the roof, were trimmed with a lower molding that served as a continuation of the door "belt" molding. A Controlled (limited-slip) Differential was included for extra traction. An optional illuminated entry and theft deterrent system was available. A new Delco Freedom battery never needed water. Simulated wire wheel covers were newly available. Other new options included a push-button Weather Band built into the AM/FM stereo signal-seeking radio, plus power passenger and manual driver seatback recliners for 50/50 front seats. Of the 15 standard and six optional Firemist body colors, 13 were new this year. New standard features included Soft-Ray tinted glass, spare tire cover, trunk mat, washer fluid level indicator, and steel belted radial whitewall tires.

1976 was the 11th and final year for the slow-selling Cadillac Calais. Sales had never been strong, and had been declining steadily since the introduction of the model in 1965; the difference in cost between the entry-level Calais and the base De Ville had become basically negligible, and Cadillac customers saw little reason to purchase a Calais when a better equipped De Ville cost only slightly more. For 1977, the totally redesigned and downsized Cadillac De Ville would become the lowest priced model in the Cadillac lineup; prices would also increase significantly.
