= Cadillac Series 65 =

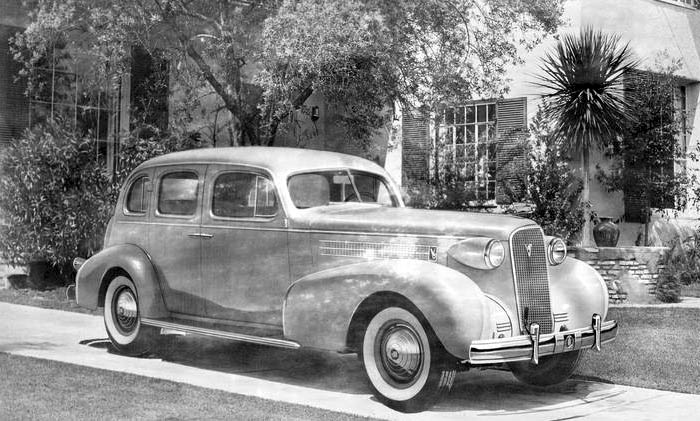

Overview
- Manufacturer: General Motors
- Model years: 1937–1938
- Assembly: Detroit, Michigan, United States
- Designer: Harley Earl

Body and chassis
- Class: Full-size luxury car
- Body style: 4-door sedan 4-door convertible
- Layout: FR layout
- Platform: C-body
- Related: Cadillac Series 70; Buick Roadmaster

Powertrain
- Engine: 346 cu in (5.7 L) Monobloc V8
- Transmission: 3-speed synchromesh manual

Dimensions
- Wheelbase: 1937: 131.0 in (3,327 mm); 1938: 132.0 in (3,353 mm); Commercial: 160.0 in (4,064 mm)
- Length: 1937: 208.2 in (5,288 mm); 1938: 211.4 in (5,370 mm)
- Width: 1937: 74.4 in (1,890 mm); 1938: 77.6 in (1,971 mm)
- Height: 1937: 69.5 in (1,765 mm); 1938: 68.0 in (1,727 mm)

Chronology
- Successor: Cadillac Series 61; Cadillac Sixty Special

The Cadillac Series 65, after the Series 60, represented Cadillac's second, and, being built on the C-body instead of the B-body, somewhat physically larger entry into the mid-priced vehicle market when it appeared in 1937. It was slightly higher in status than the LaSalle, also offered by Cadillac.

== Overview ==
In 1937 it was offered in only one body style, a 4-door 5-seat sedan, built by Fisher on the same 131.0 in (3,327 mm) wheelbase as used by the Cadillac Series 70 and the Buick Roadmaster. The car offered a longer heavier car than the Series 60 at a price below that of the Fleetwood bodied Series 70.

Under the hood was the Monobloc V8. The only displacement that was available was the 346 cu in (5.7 L). This engine produced 135 hp (101 kW) at 3400 R.P.M. The car had Bendix dual-servo brakes, "Knee-Action" independent suspension in front and a Stromberg carburetor ('37: AA-25; '38: AAV-25) with an electric choke.

In 1938 the Series 65 and the Series 75 shared a new front end style featuring a massive vertical cellular grille, three sets of horizontal bars on the hood sides, alligator hood, and headlights on the filler space between the fenders and the hood. Optional sidemount covers were hinged to the fenders. Quarter windows were of sliding rather than hinged construction. The rear of the body had rounder corners and more smoothly blended lines. Trunks had more of an appearance of being an integral part of the body. Bodies were all steel except for wooden main sills. New chassis details included a column gear shift, horns just behind the grille, battery under the right hand side of the hood, transverse muffler just behind the fuel tank, wheels by a different manufacturer, "Synchro-Flex" flywheel, hypoid rear axle and the deletion of the oil filter.
