= Cadillac Type 51 =

Car model

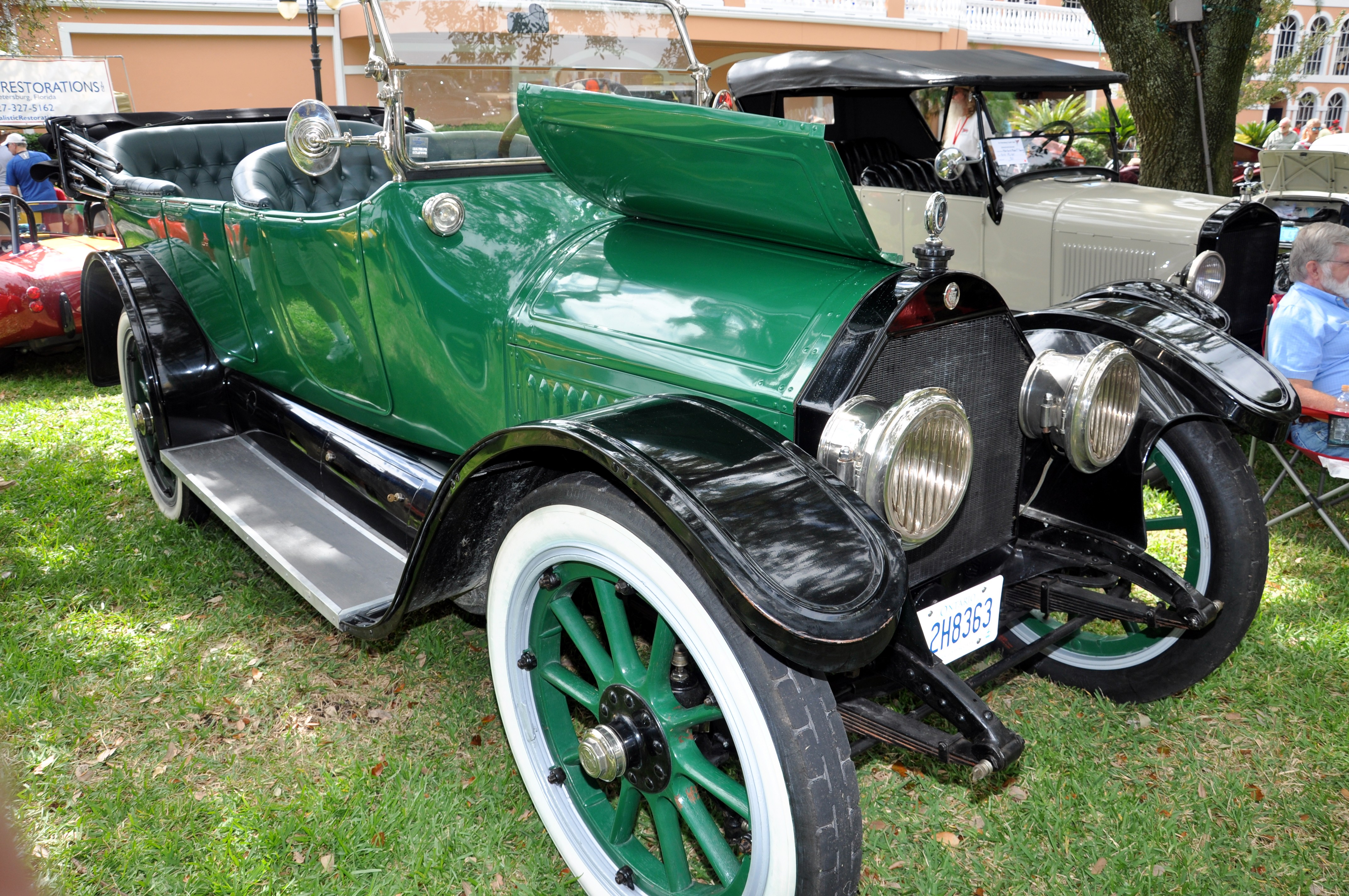
- 1915 Cadillac Type 51 Phaeton

Overview
- Manufacturer: Cadillac (General Motors)
- Model years: 1915–1923
- Assembly: United States Detroit, Michigan (Cass Street Factory)

Body and chassis
- Class: luxury car
- Layout: Front-engine, rear-wheel-drive

Powertrain
- Engine: 314 cu in (5.1 L) L-head V8
- Transmission: 3-speed manual

Dimensions
- Wheelbase: 122 in (3,099 mm); 125 in (3,175 mm); 132 in (3,353 mm); 145 in (3,683 mm) (commercial use)

Chronology
- Successor: Cadillac V-63

The Cadillac V8, introduced as the Type 51 (but also the Types 53, 55, 57, 59, and 61) is a large luxury car that was introduced in September 1914 by Cadillac as a 1915 model. It was Cadillac's first V8 automobile, replacing the four-cylinder Model 30, and used the all new GM A platform for the entire series shared with all GM division brands using a 122 in (3,099 mm) wheelbase.

The Types 53, 55, 57, 59, and 61 were introduced every year through 1923 with yearly improvements until an all new platform was substantially updated and introduced as the V-63 using the business philosophy called planned obsolescence. It was built at the Cass Street and Amsterdam Avenue factory in Detroit, with the coachwork provided by Fisher Body. The chassis could be purchased separately and sent to the clients choice of coachbuilder optionally.

== Models ==
When GM decided to enter Cadillac as their top level luxury car as an alternative to luxury brands already established, it was a competitor to the all-new Packard Twin Six. The most expensive coachwork option offered from Cadillac for 1915 was the Berline Limousine at US$3,600 ($114,572 in 2025 dollars).

All of these models used a new L-head V8 engine, one of the first V8 engines ever mass-produced and a substantial differentiator for the marque. All bodies were built by Fisher. Wheelbases varied in those years, with 122 in (3099 mm) at the low end and 145 in (3683 mm) as the longest.

=== Type 51 ===
The Type 51 was Cadillac's first V8 automobile, and used the all new GM A platform shared with all GM division brands using a 122 in (3,099 mm) wheelbase, with a 145 in (3,683 mm) chassis offered separately for custom coachwork. It was also the first left-hand drive Cadillac—all previous models had been right-hand drive, which was continued as an option.

=== Type 53 ===
The 1916 Type 53 introduced the control layout for the modern automobile with the gear lever and hand brake in the middle of the front two seats, a key started ignition, and three pedals for the clutch, brake and throttle in the modern order. This Cadillac was driven by a 77 horsepower V8 engine. The Type 53 designation was used one year only, then each year the designation number would update for each model year. Nine body styles were offered, and for the first time, from 1916 until 1919, Cadillac offered three commercial use platforms, described as Police Patrol (US$2,955), Ambulance (US$3,455) and Hearse (US$3,880) ($114,798 in 2025 dollars).

In May 1916, Erwin "Cannonball" Baker and William Sturm drove a Cadillac Roadster from Los Angeles to New York in 7 days, 11 hours, and 52 minutes.

=== Type 55 ===
The 1917 Type 55 was introduced with appearance changes, and cast aluminum is used when constructing the 2-door, 4-passenger Coupe. The choice of available body styles increases to 12, including the commercial versions. The Berline coach choice is renamed Imperial due to WWI as Cadillac did not want to associate its products with Imperial Germany. This was also the year that cross town rival Lincoln offered a V8 luxury sedan and several different coachwork choices, while the introduction of the Packard Twin Six appeared in 1916.

In July 1917, the United States Army needed a dependable staff car and chose the Cadillac Type 55 Touring Model after exhaustive tests on the Mexican border during the Mexican Border War (1910–1919). 2,350 of the cars were supplied for use in France by officers of the American Expeditionary Force in World War I.

=== Type 57 ===
The Type 57 appeared for model year 1918, with Cadillac offering a new coachwork option called the Type 57 Suburban which could accommodate seven passengers with a 132 in (3,353 mm) wheelbase, and was the first time GM used that description for one of their products with a retail price of US$4,090 ($87,546 in 2025 dollars). A new commercial coach choice labeled US Government Limousine was offered in addition to the ambulance, police patrol and hearse, and the cylinder heads on the V8 engine were now detachable for maintenance .

The 1919 Type 57 again saw minor appearance changes and body styles offered, while removing the landaulet, town landaulet and hearse and adding the Imperial Suburban with a 132 in (3,353 mm) wheelbase and renaming the Town Limousine as Town Brougham. The Victoria Coupe was no longer a convertible and used aluminum in the roof construction. Body types were now identified as either 57-A or 57-B while this was not a Type designation for the vehicle affected.

=== Type 59 ===
The Type 59 was produced for model years 1920 and 1921,which were essentially combined due to the postwar economy, material shortages, and the Great Railroad Strike of 1922, while Cadillac was in transition from the Cass Street Factory to the new Detroit Assembly factory nearing completion on Clark Street. Fisher Body continued the tradition of making minor appearance, equipment and feature changes, changing the angle of the windshield, or positioning of exterior lighting elements. Body style changes were now documented as First, Second and Third design and choices were now reduced to 10. The previous Type 57 had earned a favorable reputation with its deployment during the war, and orders for the latest model contributed to long waiting lists. The top level Imperial Limousine was now listed at US$5190 ($93,681 in 2025 dollars). A new manufacturer entered the competition, focusing on engineering excellence called Duesenberg and offered a few body styles that were premium priced in 1921.

=== Type 61 ===
The Type 61 was the last vehicle built at the Cass Street Factory, and due to various contributing factors carried over from the previous Type 59, was manufactured for model years 1922 and 1923. As before, there were various appearance, equipment, standard and optional feature changes to include an extendable trunk rack on the rear of the most body styles, running board kick plates on five-passenger sedan and phaeton, along with the inclusion of nickel-plated exterior lights and radiator shell offered. The diameter of the wheels was reduced to lower the center of gravity, while the 132 in (3,353 mm) wheelbase was the only choice. Body style continued to be documented as First, Second and Third Design, and 41,001 vehicles were produced. For the first time, the prices were reduced across all models following an automobile industry trend due to increased production schedules, improved manufacturing efficiency and economic pressures. The top level Landaulet Sedan was US$5290 ($101,751 in 2025 dollars) while the Imperial Limousine was US$4950 ($95,211 in 2025 dollars).

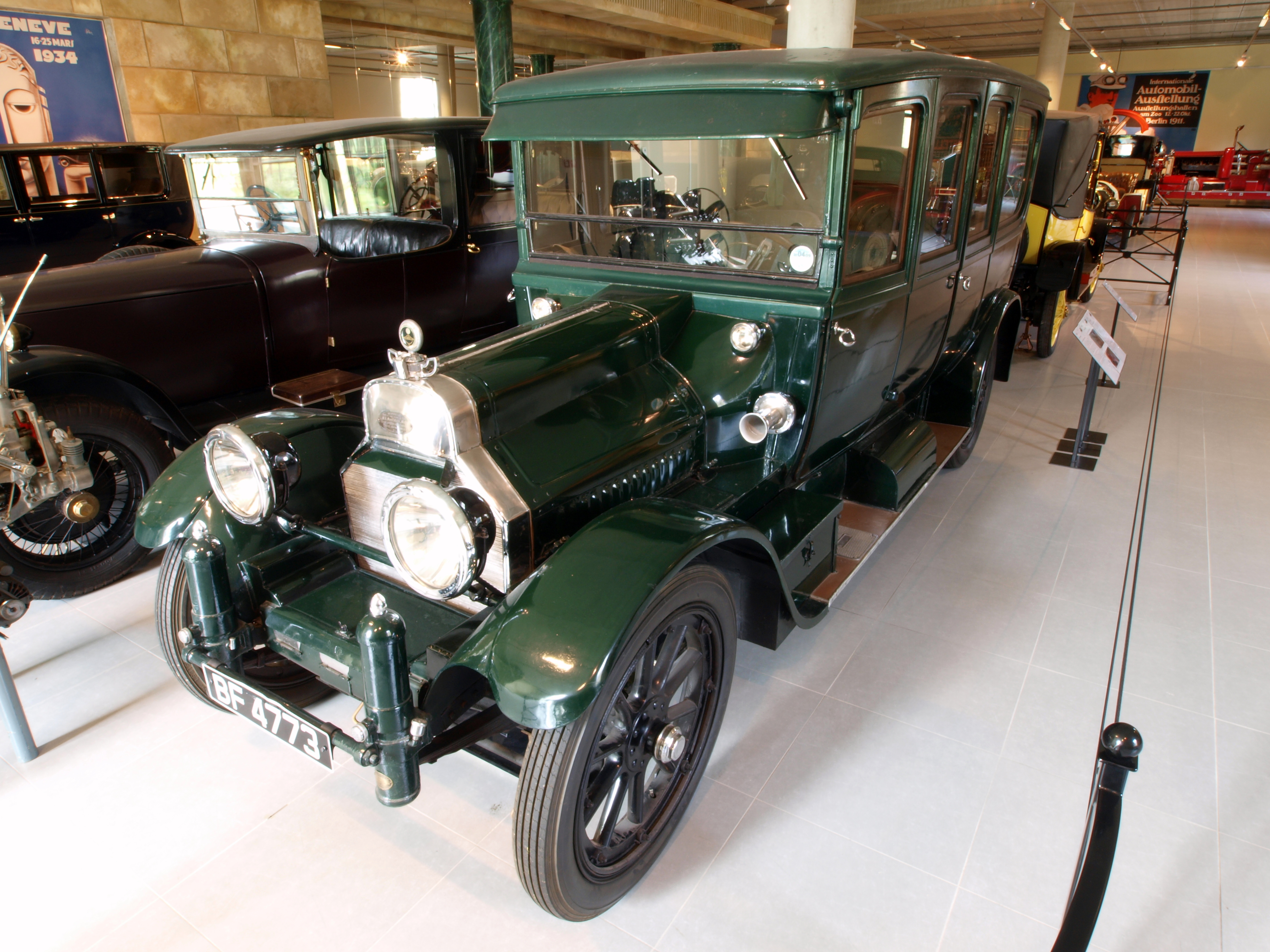
Type 51 Imperial limousine 1915

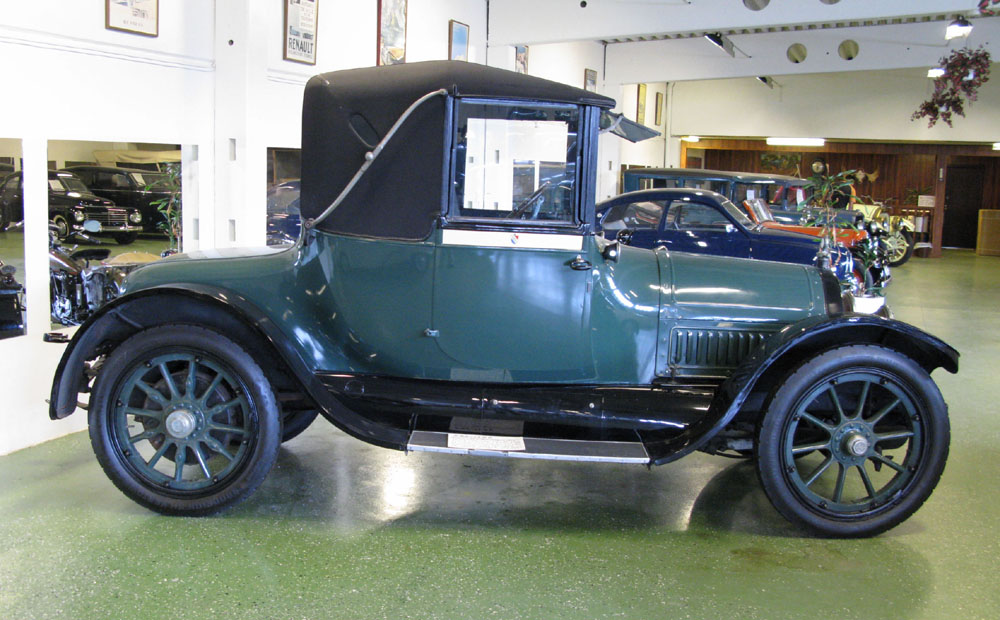
Type 53 Victoria 1916

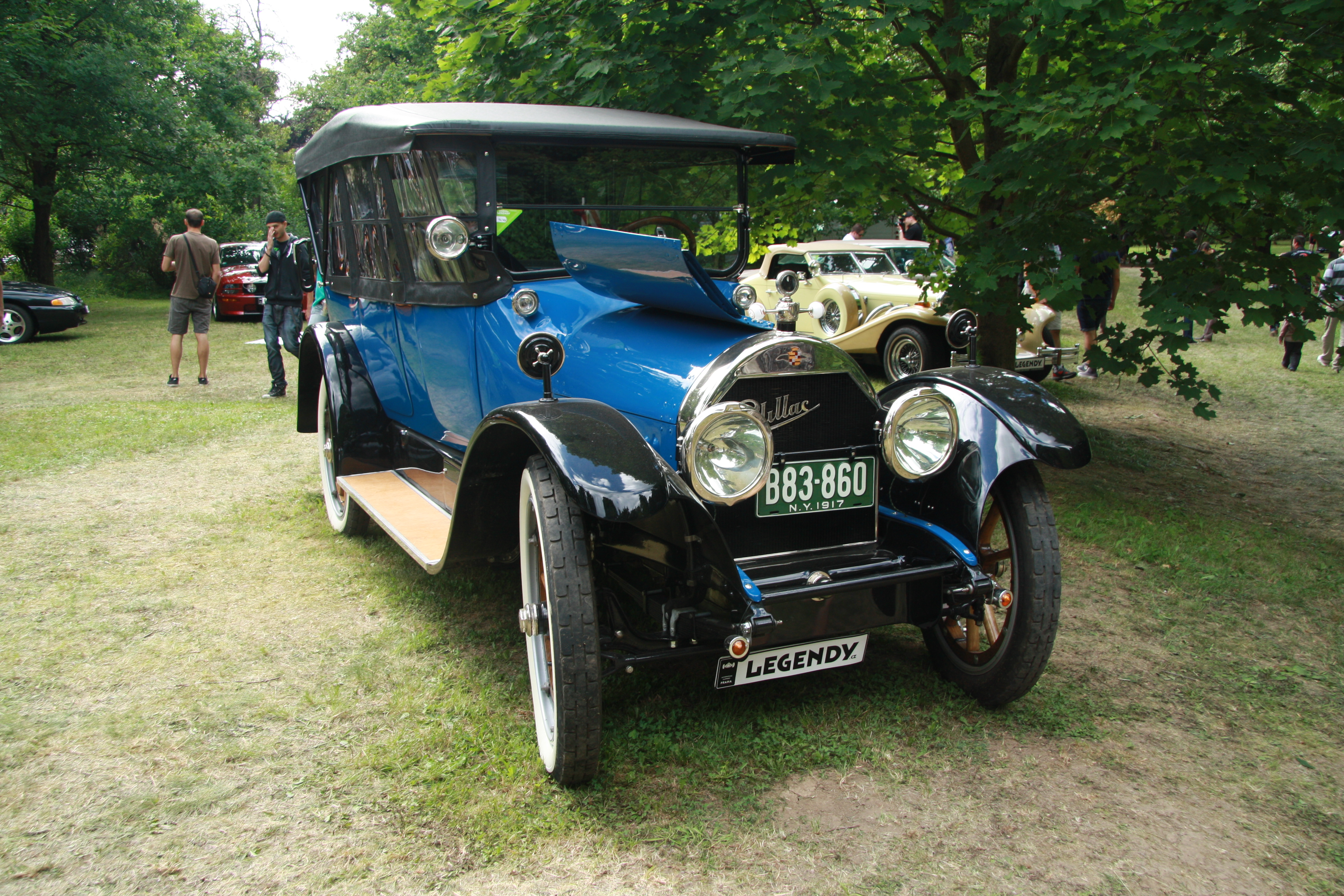
Type 55 Suburban 1917

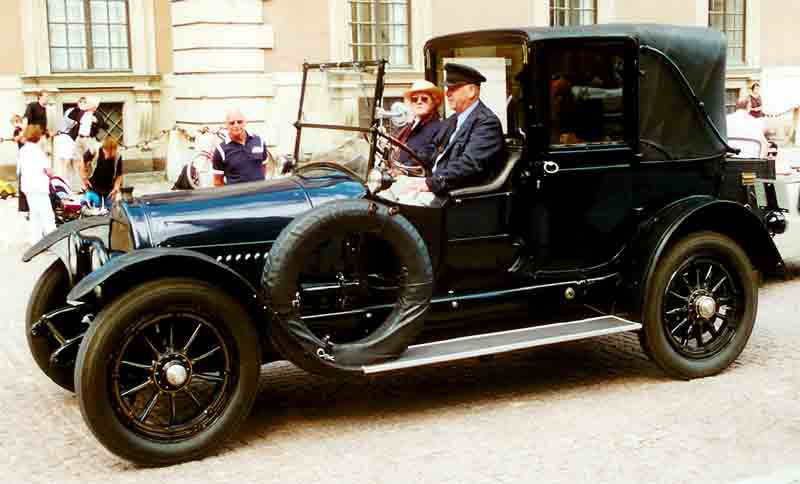
Type 57 Town Car 1919

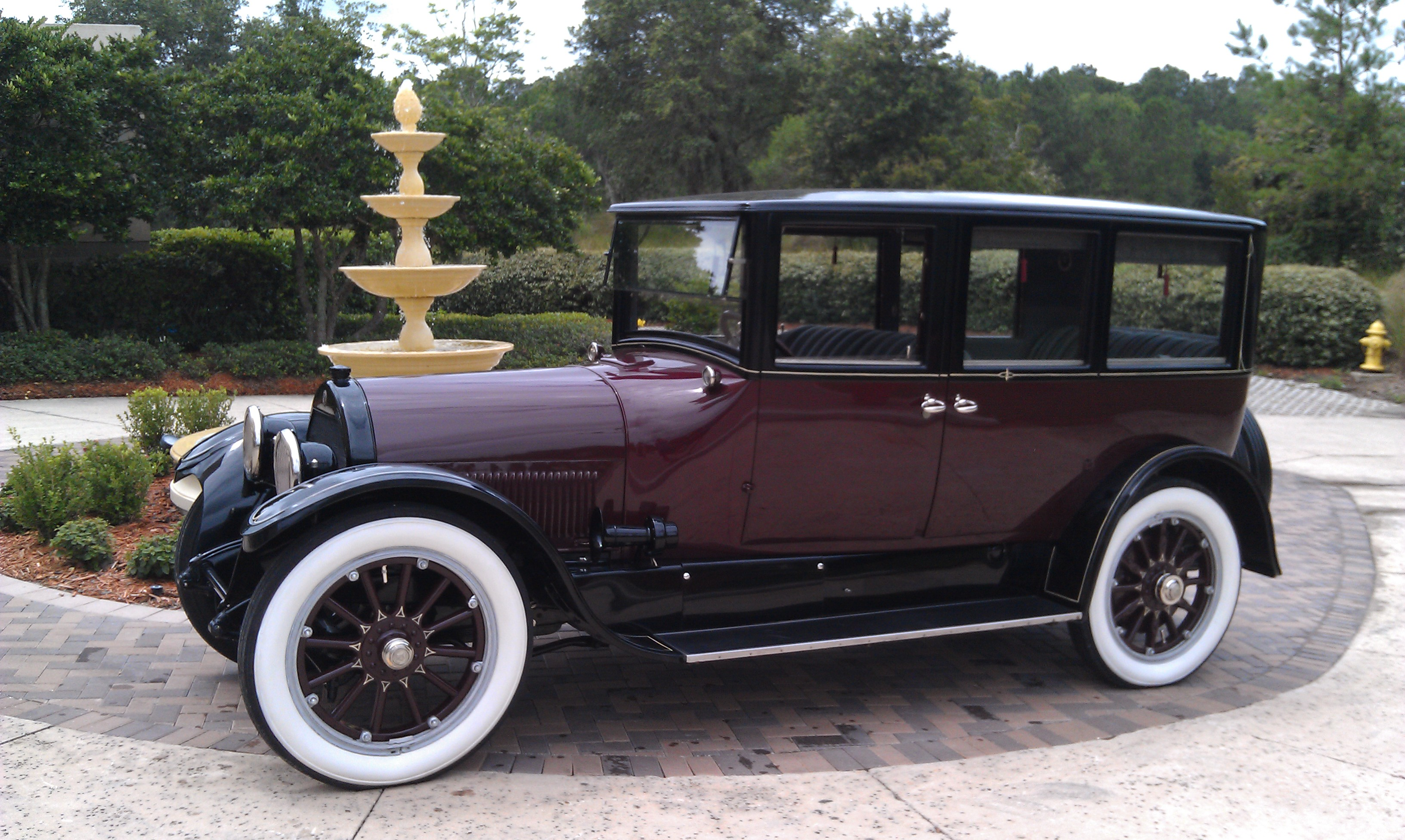
Type 59 Suburban 1921

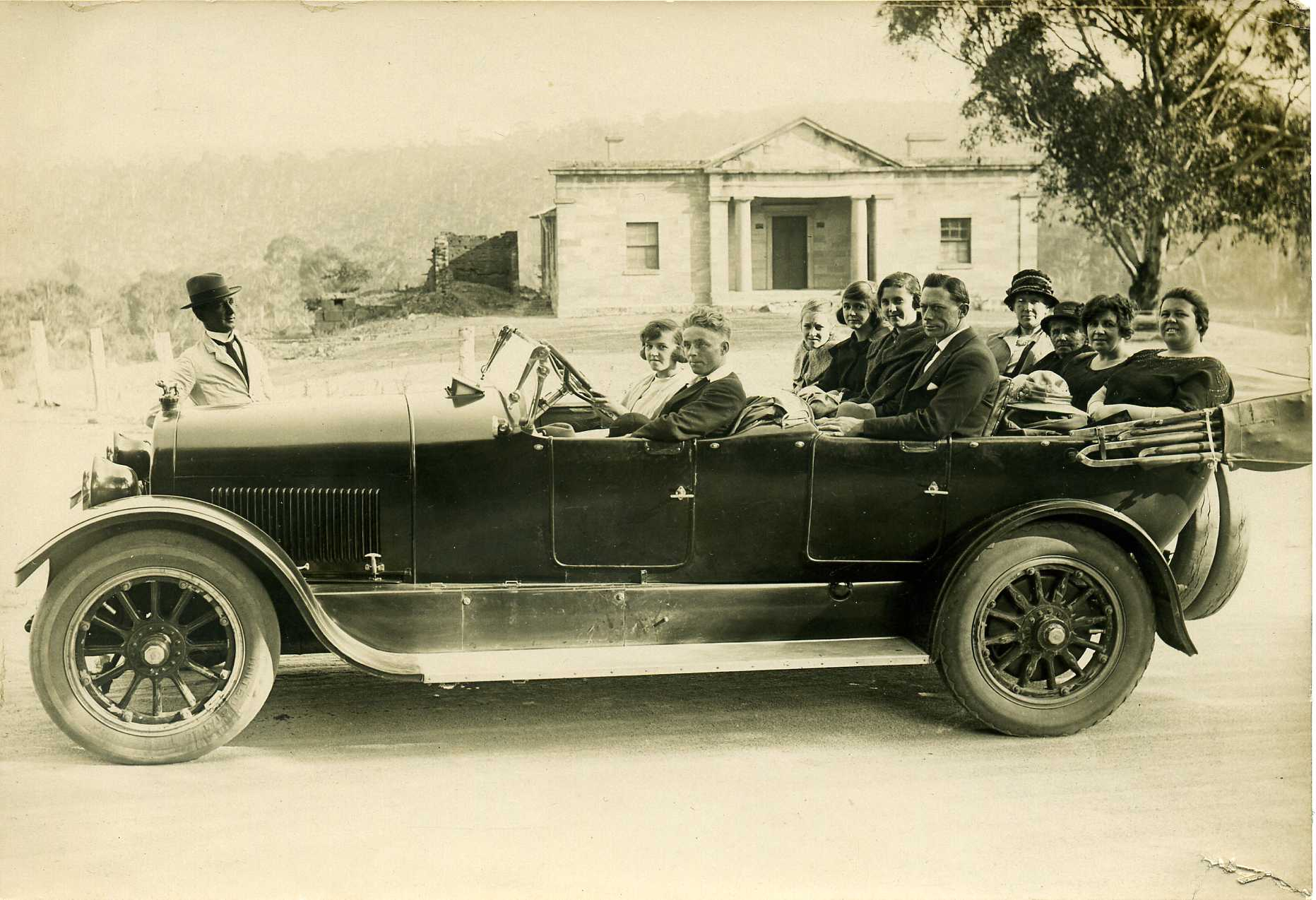
Type 61 Phaeton 1922

== See also ==
- Buick Six
- Oldsmobile Light Eight
- Oldsmobile Model 42
- Oakland Six
- Chevrolet Series FA
