= Cadillac Evoq =

Concept car developed by Cadillac

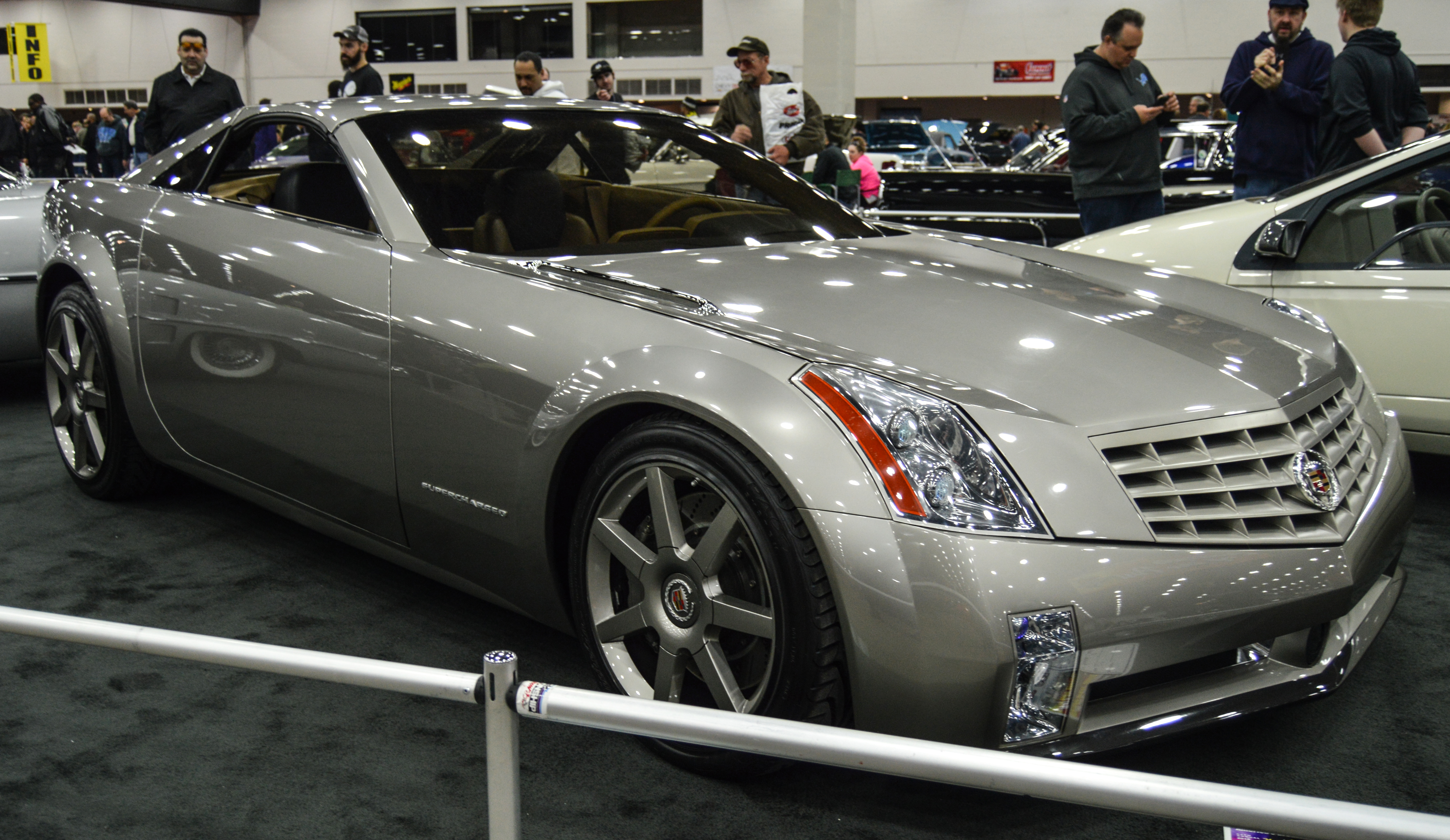
- The Evoq concept photographed in 2016

Overview
- Manufacturer: Cadillac (General Motors)
- Designer: Kip Wasenko

Body and chassis
- Class: Concept car
- Body style: Coupe
- Related: Cadillac XLR

Powertrain
- Engine: V8
- Transmission: 4-speed automatic

Dimensions
- Wheelbase: 275.6 cm (108.5 in)
- Length: 428.2 cm (168.6 in)
- Width: 183.4 cm (72.2 in)
- Height: 124.7 cm (49.1 in)
- Curb weight: 1769 kg (3900 lbs)

The Cadillac Evoq (pronounced "evoke") is a two-passenger, rear drive, retractable hardtop concept convertible designed by Cadillac and presented at the 1999 Detroit Auto Show.

Using Cadillac's newly developed Art and Science design language, conceived by Kip Wasenko with key contributions from Thomas Kearns and Mike Torpey, many of the Evoq's design styling elements were used with subsequent production models.

Noted automotive journalist, Dan Neal, described the design language as a "fractal geometric style" and suggested that GM's Art and Science concept cars, including the Evoq as well as the Imaj sedan, Vizon sport wagon and the Cien supercar, worked to acclimate the public to the new design language. The Evoq thus became a statement of brand identity, leading to numerous subsequent production models, including the Cadillac XLR, CTS and SRX.

The Evoq was hand built by Metalcrafters of California in 1998 using the first Northstar designed for a rear drive application.
