= Cadillac Series 62 =

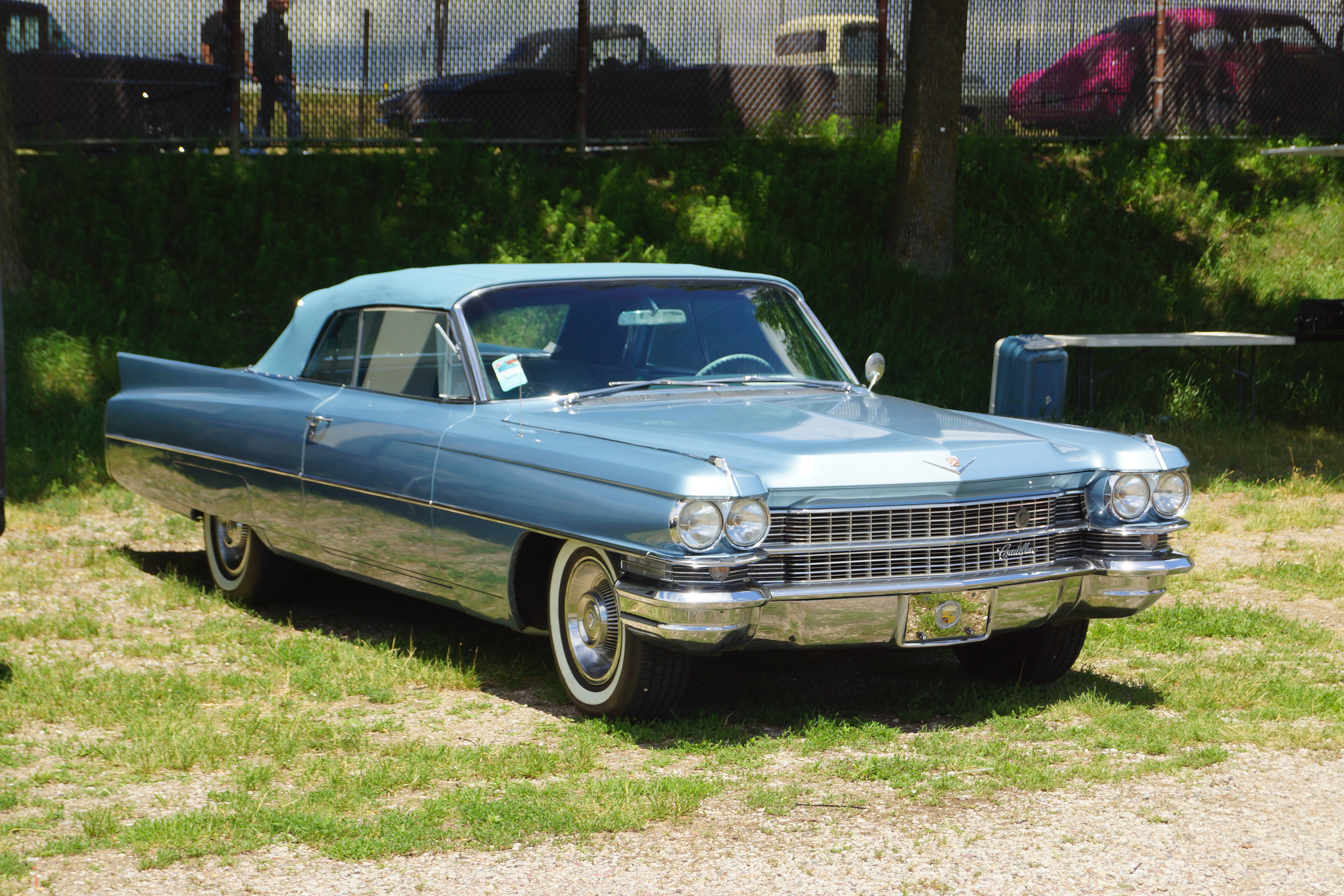
- 1963 Cadillac Series Sixty-Two Convertible

Overview
- Manufacturer: Cadillac
- Production: 1940–1942; 1946–1964
- Assembly: Detroit Assembly, Detroit, Michigan, United States

Body and chassis
- Class: Full-size luxury car
- Layout: Front-engine, rear-wheel-drive

Chronology
- Predecessor: Cadillac Series 61; Cadillac Series 65
- Successor: Cadillac Calais; Cadillac de Ville

The Cadillac Series 40-62 is a series of cars which was produced by Cadillac from 1940 through 1964. Originally designed to complement the entry-level Series 61, it became the Cadillac Series 6200 in 1959, and remained that until it was renamed to Cadillac Calais for the 1965 model year. The Series 62 was also marketed as the Sixty-Two and the Series Sixty-Two. The Series 62 was used to introduce the Cadillac Coupe de Ville and the Cadillac Eldorado, which started out as special appearance packages that were later placed into production.

== First generation (1940–1941) ==
First generation
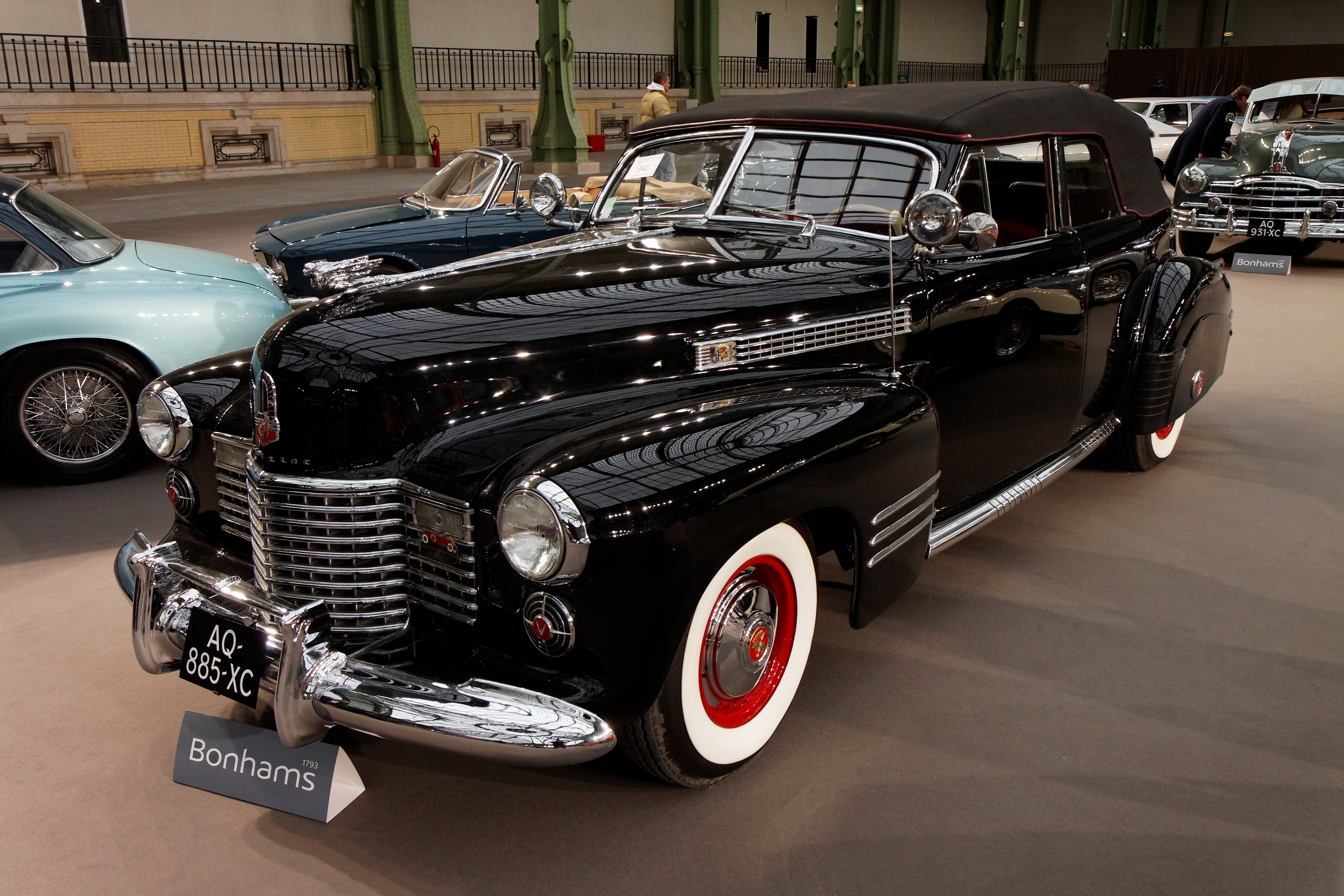
- 1941 Cadillac Series 41-62 convertible sedan

Overview
- Model years: 1940–1941
- Designer: Harley Earl

Body and chassis
- Body style: 2-door coupe 4-door sedan 2-door convertible 4-door convertible
- Platform: C-body
- Related: Buick Roadmaster; Buick Super; Oldsmobile 90/96/98; Pontiac Custom Torpedo

Powertrain
- Engine: 346 cu in (5.7 L) Monobloc V8
- Transmission: 3-speed selective synchromesh manual 4-speed Hydra-Matic automatic

Dimensions
- Wheelbase: 1940: 129.0 in (3,277 mm); 1941: 126.0 in (3,200 mm) Commercial: 163.0 in (4,140 mm)
- Length: 1940: 216.1 in (5,489 mm); 1941: 216.0 in (5,486 mm); Commercial: 252.9 in (6,424 mm)
- Width: 1940: 75.6 in (1,920 mm); 1941: 80.0 in (2,032 mm)
- Height: 64.5 in (1,638 mm)
- Curb weight: 4,100–4,400 lb (1,900–2,000 kg)

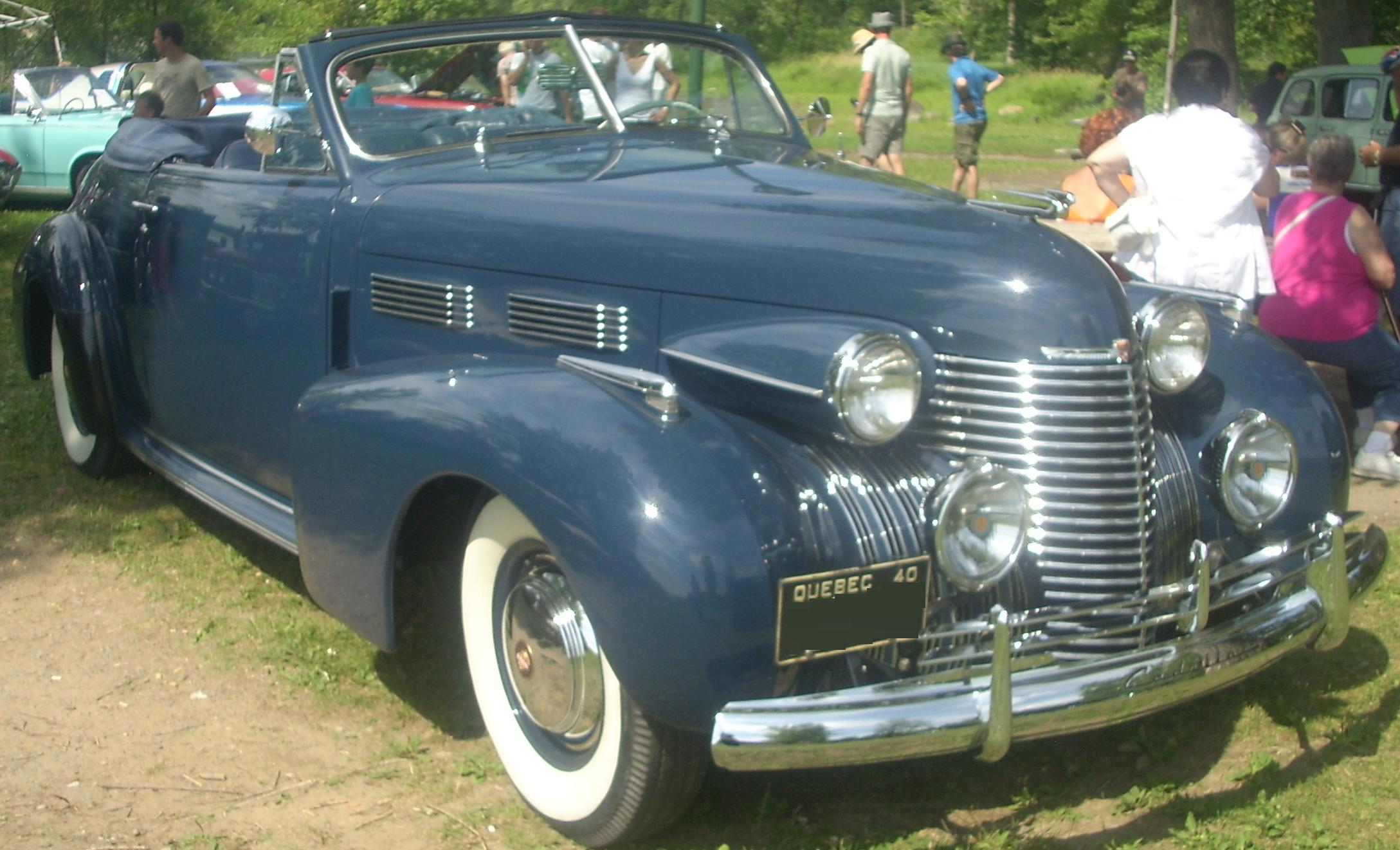
1940 Cadillac Series 40-62 2-door convertible

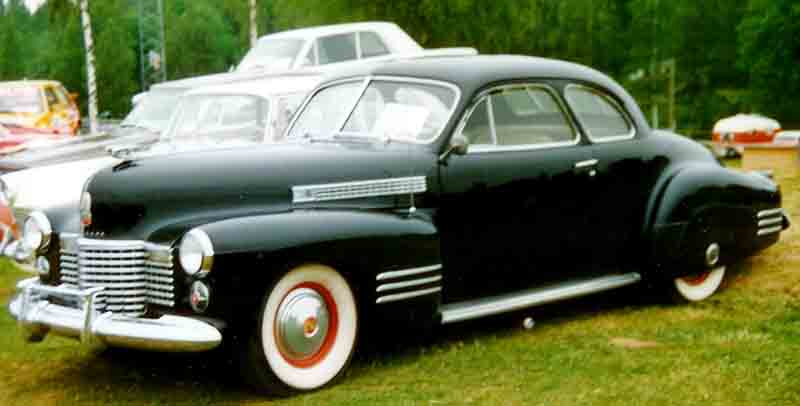
1941 Cadillac Series 41-62 coupe

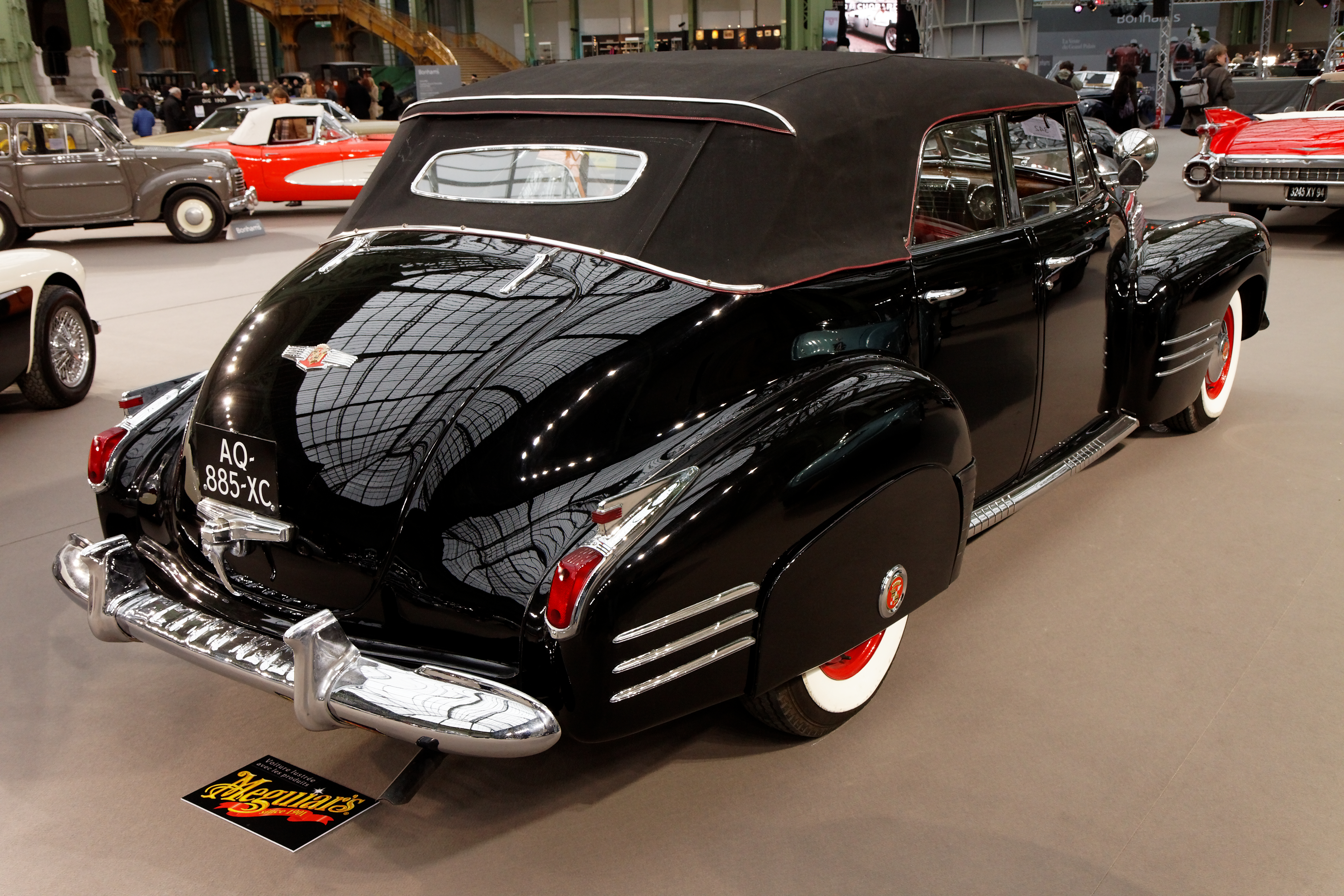
1941 Cadillac Series 41-62 4-door convertible

The Fisher-bodied Series 40-62 was the new entry-level product for the 1940 model line and was upgraded with a low, sleek "torpedo" style C-body with chrome window reveals, more slant in the windshield, and a curved rear window. The new C-body that the 1940 Cadillac Series 62 shared with the Buick Roadmaster and Super, the Oldsmobile Series 90 and the Pontiac Custom Torpedo featured shoulder and hip room that was over 5 inches wider, the elimination of running boards and exterior styling that was streamlined and 2-3 inches lower. When combined with a column-mounted shift lever connected to the Hydramatic automatic transmission, the cars offered true six-passenger comfort. It was GM's competitor to the popular-selling Packard One-Twenty.

These changes were carried over to the Cadillac Sixty Special borrowing a naming convention from the entry-level Buick Special. The styling feature distinguishing all V-8 Cadillacs was once again the grille. Although grilles had the same pointed shape as in 1939, the grille bars were heavier and fewer in number. Two sets of louver bars appeared on each side of the hood. Running boards were a no cost option. The Series 62 was available as a club coupe or a sedan, with 2-door and 4-door convertibles introduced mid-year. Sales totaled 5,903 in its inaugural year accounting for about 45% of Cadillac's sales. The 2-passenger Coupe was listed for US$1,685 ($38,723 in 2025 dollars), the 5-passenger Touring Sedan was US$1,745 ($40,102 in 2025 dollars), and the 4-door Convertible Sedan was US$2,195 ($50,443 in 2025 dollars). While the 2-door could only accommodate 2 passengers, they were labeled as "coupes" instead of the more accurate roadster, then in 1941 passenger capacity increased to four.

In 1941, the one piece hood came down lower in the front, included the side panels and extended sideways to the fenders. A single rectangular panel of louver trim was used on each side of the hood. The rectangular grille was wide, vertical, and bulged forward in the middle. Rectangular parking lights were built into the top outer corners of the grille. Headlights were now built into the nose of the fenders, and provision for built in accessory fog lights was provided under the headlights. Three chrome spears appeared on the rear section of all four fenders. Rear fender skirts were standard. The Series 62 offered the only 4-door convertible built by Cadillac in 1941 and it would be the last time this bodystyle was ever made by the marque. All Cadillacs shared the same 346 cu in (5.7 L) 135 hp (101 kW) L-head V8 that year, with power rising to 150 hp (112 kW).

Sales more than quadrupled to 24,734, accounting for 37% of Cadillac sales in a sales year that well more than doubled the previous Cadillac sales rate record set during the two model years of 1926–27, in part due to the huge popularity of the new Series 61. Evidently the new "torpedo" style with its low streamlined runningboardless bodies and expansive shoulder room had proved a big hit. The following model year, abbreviated as it was by a world war, would set no such sales record.

== Second generation (1942, 1946–1947) ==
Second generation
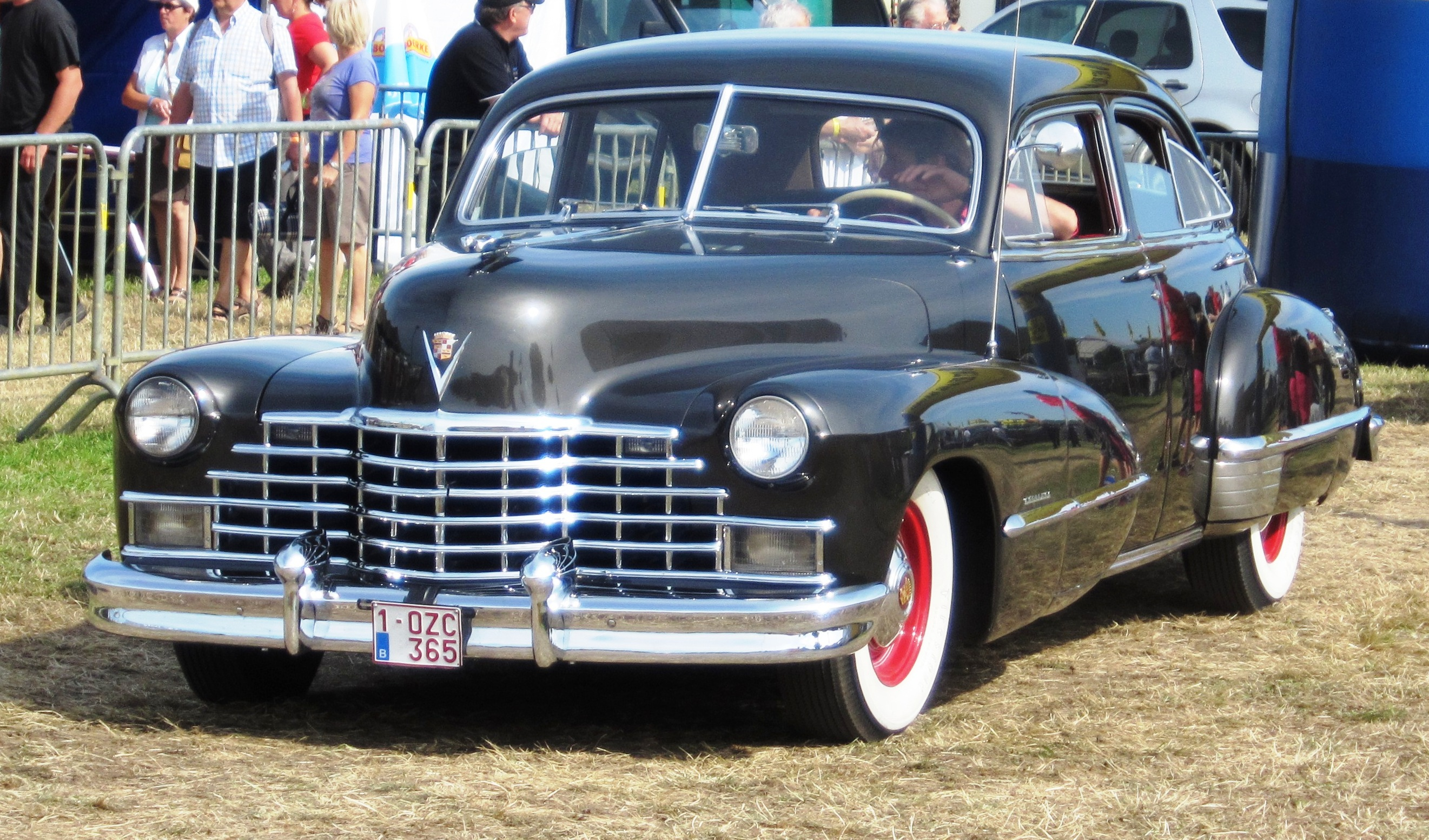
- 1946 Cadillac Series 62 4-door Sedan

Overview
- Model years: 1942, 1946–1947
- Designer: Harley Earl

Body and chassis
- Body style: 2-door coupe 4-door sedan 2-door convertible
- Platform: C-body
- Related: Cadillac Sixty Special; Buick Roadmaster; Buick Super; Oldsmobile 98

Powertrain
- Engine: 346 cu in (5.7 L) Monobloc V8
- Transmission: 3-speed selective synchromesh manual 4-speed Hydra-Matic automatic

Dimensions
- Wheelbase: 129.0 in (3,277 mm)
- Length: 1942: 220.0 in (5,588 mm); 1946–47: 219.2 in (5,568 mm)
- Width: 80.8 in (2,052 mm)
- Height: 63.1 in (1,603 mm)
- Curb weight: 4,300–4,700 lb (2,000–2,100 kg)

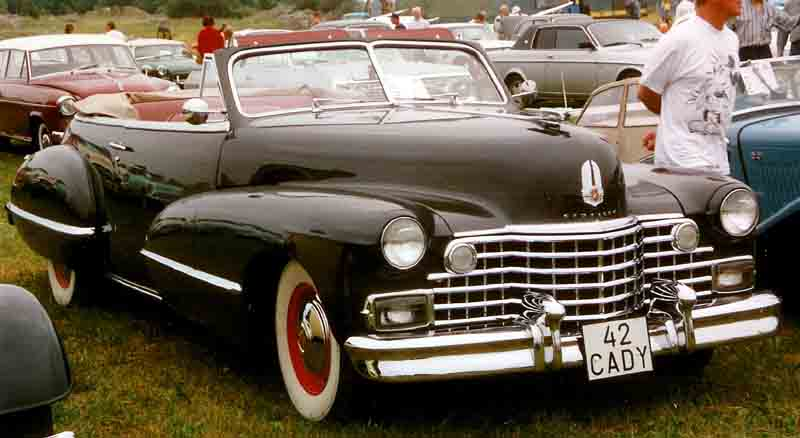
1942 Cadillac Series 62 Convertible Club Coupe

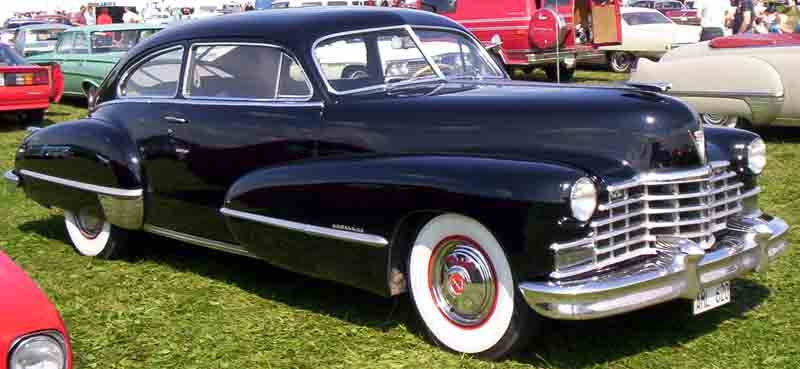
1946 Cadillac Series 62 Club Coupe

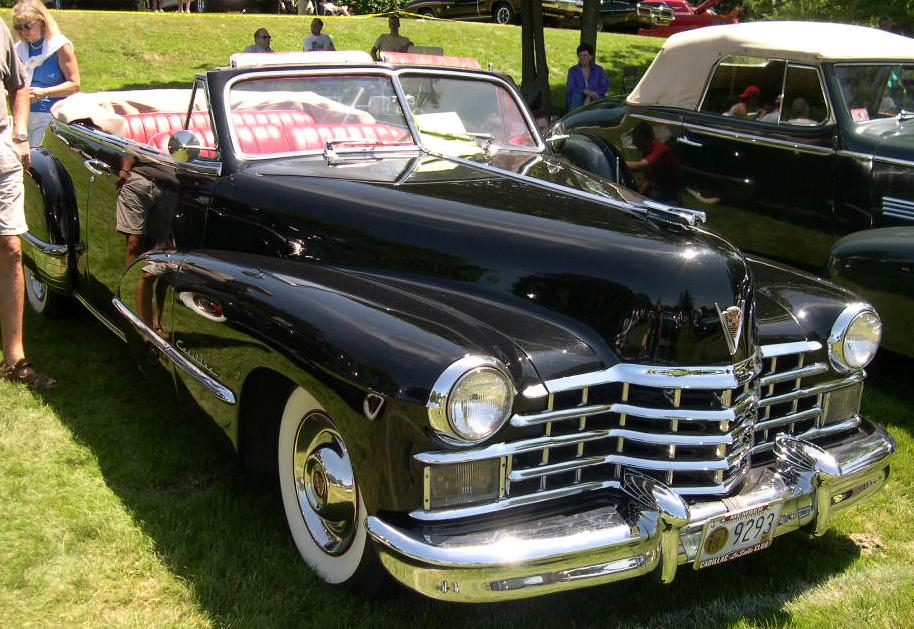
1947 Cadillac Series 62 Convertible

The grille became more massive in 1942, with even fewer bars and was the beginning of the traditional "egg crate" appearance that all future products adopted. Parking lights became round and fog light sockets became rectangular and were included in the grille area. A bullet shape appeared on the tops of the bumper guards. Fenders were rounded and longer and no longer featured side ventilation grilles. Front fender character outlines now extended into the front doors, a feature GM called "Airfoil" for all products for that year, and rear fenders extended forward into the rear door. The new fenders had heavy moldings along the sides. The appearance was more expressive and expansive in comparison to the all-new Packard Clipper introduced at the same time. A new fresh air ventilating system with air ducts leading from the grille replaced cowl ventilators. Handbrake control was changed from lever to tee-shaped pull handle. Radiator shutter control of engine temperature was replaced by a blocking type thermostat in the water return fitting in the radiator. Vehicles that were built until February 1942 could be identified as lacking chrome trim starting in January when it was prohibited due to wartime production and trim pieces including bumpers were painted.

The first postwar Cadillac rolled off the line on October 7, 1945, and for several months, only Series 62s were produced. 1946 Cadillacs were not significantly altered from 1942 outside a few styling changes and the addition of a negative ground battery. The Series 62 retained the same lineup of body styles as in 1942—coupe, sedan, and convertible, and 18,565 total were produced for the model year, approximately 65% of Cadillac's total 1946 output of 29,000 vehicles. Resuming civilian production was a difficult task for the entire automobile industry and demand for new cars much exceeded supply. Cadillac had as many as 100,000 unfilled orders into 1947. Due to materials shortages, some Cadillacs shipped from the factory with wooden bumpers, dealers being expected to install proper ones as they became available. Postwar inflation pushed the sticker price of a 1946 Cadillac over $1000 higher than 1942.

In 1946, the Series 62 used GM's C-body platform, as did the Cadillac Sixty Special, Buick Super and Buick Roadmaster, and Oldsmobile 98. Notchback styling characterized the cars except for the Club Coupe which had fastback styling. It was easy to distinguish the Series 62 coupe from the Series 61 because the door skins did not flare out above the rocker panel moldings, and the side window openings were lower and the reveal window moldings circled each window individually instead of looping around all the windows. The Series 62 sedan featured ventiplanes on both the front and rear door windows. It was also the first Cadillac to enter production after World War II. Interior styling and technical features were similar to those seen on the Cadillac Series 61 but with slightly richer interior appointments. Late 1946 models introduced technical changes to the V8 engine in the form of hardened ball seats for the hydraulic lifters.

The 1947 models received minor styling changes and the addition of Hydro-Lectric window lifts on the Series 62 convertible, which remained the sole convertible in Cadillac's lineup. 1947 grilles featured five horizontal blades in place of the six blades used for 1946. Polished metal stone guards on the fenders replaced the rubber ones used on 1946 models. As before, Series 62s remained Cadillac's best-selling model with 39,834 produced, 84% of the make's total 1947 volume.

== Third generation (1948–1953) ==
Third generation
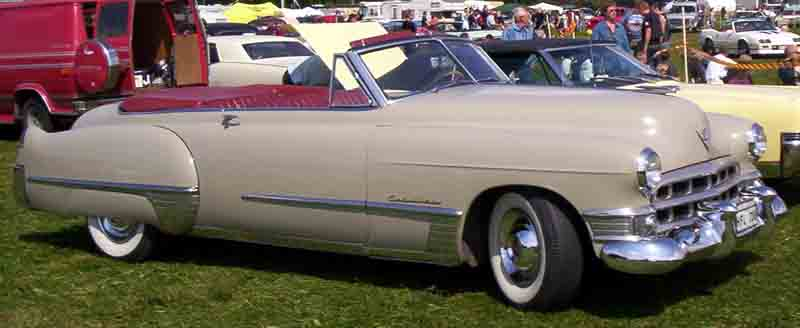
- 1949 Cadillac Series Sixty-Two Convertible

Overview
- Model years: 1948–1953
- Designer: Harley Earl

Body and chassis
- Body style: 2-door coupe 2-door hardtop 4-door sedan 2-door convertible 2-door Eldorado convertible
- Platform: C-body
- Related: Cadillac Series 61; Cadillac Sixty Special; Buick Roadmaster; Buick Super; Oldsmobile 98

Powertrain
- Engine: 346 cu in (5.7 L) Monobloc V8; 331 cu in (5.4 L) OHV V8
- Transmission: 3-speed selective synchromesh manual 4-speed Hydra-Matic automatic

Dimensions
- Wheelbase: 126.0 in (3,200 mm)
- Length: 1948–1950: 214.0 in (5,436 mm); 1951: 215.8 in (5,481 mm); 1952–53 4-door: 215.8 in (5,481 mm); 1952–53 2-door: 220.8 in (5,608 mm)
- Width: 1948: 79.0 in (2,007 mm); 1949: 78.9 in (2,004 mm); 1950–1953: 80.1 in (2,035 mm)
- Height: 62.7 in (1,593 mm)
- Curb weight: 4,400–5,000 lb (2,000–2,300 kg)

The first all-new postwar Cadillacs arrived in 1948, sporting tail fins inspired by the Lockheed P-38 fighter plane on a Cadillac. Series 62 Cadillacs had a slightly shortened wheelbase, but the track width was increased by two inches, increasing interior room. However, updated drivetrains would have to wait another year and for the time being, the new Cadillacs were still powered by the same 346 CID flathead V8 used across the board since 1941, which delivered only fair performance (0-60 in 16 seconds with a top speed of 93 mph). Fuel mileage was an estimated 14 mpg highway, 10 mpg city with the Hydramatic transmission, which was rapidly becoming the norm — by 1949, only 10% of Cadillacs were ordered with the 3-speed manual gearbox. Series 62 production totaled 34,213 vehicles for the 1948 model year, accounting for 68% of Cadillac's volume. The 1948 models had been slow to get into production and did not arrive in showrooms until February 1948, consequently Cadillac produced only 50,599 total vehicles for the abbreviated model year.

The new Cadillac OHV V8 was the big news for 1949, with minor trim differences otherwise. This 331 cu in (5.4 L) engine produced 160 hp (119 kW) and weighed 200 pounds less than the old flathead V8 in addition to being shorter and lower. The 331 V8 could also handle higher compression levels to take advantage of improved, higher octane postwar gasoline formulations. The major difference between Series 61 and Series 62 models of similar body style was minor trim variations. The higher-priced series again had grooved, front fender stone shields and bright rocker panel moldings. Chevrons below the taillights were no longer seen. The convertible was an exclusive offering. A heater was optional. Sales reached a record 55,643.

The Cadillac Series 62 Coupe de Ville was introduced late in the 1949 model year. Along with the Buick Roadmaster Riviera, and the Oldsmobile 98 Holiday, it was among the first pillarless hardtop coupes ever produced. At $3,496 ($47,306 in 2025 dollars) it was only a dollar less than the Series 62 convertible, and like the convertible, it came with power windows standard. It was luxuriously trimmed, with leather upholstery and chrome 'bows' in the headliner to simulate the ribs of a convertible top.

55,643 Series 62 Cadillacs were produced in 1949 out of a total volume of 92,554 vehicles.

For 1950, major styling changes were performed. The cars were lower and sleeker, with longer hoods, and one-piece windshields were fitted. Hydra Matic transmission was now standard. The Series 61 was again a short wheelbase model, having been reduced to 122 in (3099 mm). Sales set yet another record at 59,818.

Full-length chrome rocker panels set off the 1951 model, and the Coupe de Ville was now marked with noticeably-improved trim, including Coupe de Ville script on the rear roof pillar. Sales were 81,844, or a record of over 74% of all Cadillacs sold. Popular Mechanics reported about 12-MPG at 45 mph.

In 1952, to commemorate the 50th anniversary of Cadillac, the V-shaped hood and deck emblems were done as gold castings. The Series 62 sedan was also characterized by a higher rear deck lid contour. This provided additional luggage space. Back up lights were now standard equipment and were incorporated in the taillights. The grille wraparound panels were redesigned once again having broad chrome trim below each headlight with side scoop styling and gold-colored winged emblem mounted in the center. At the rear all Cadillacs adopted a through the bumper dual exhaust system. Deck ornamentation took the form of a Cadillac crest over a broad golden "V". New standard features included self-winding clocks, improved direction signal indicators, glare proof mirrors, stannate treated pistons, and four barrel carburetion. Engine output for the 331 was up to 190 hp (142 kW). Sales fell to 70,255, but with the Series 61 out of the way, Series 62 sales accounted for a record 78% of all Cadillacs.

The 1953 Series 62 saw a redesigned grille with heavier integral bumper and bumper guards, the repositioning of parking lamps directly under the headlights, chrome "eyebrow" type headlamp doors, and one piece rear windows without division bars. Wheel discs were fashioned in an attractive new disced design. Series 62 bodystyles were identified by non louvered rear fenders, the use of thin bright metal underscores on the bottom rear of the cars only and the decoration of both hood and deck lid with Cadillac crests and V-shaped ornaments. The Club Coupe model disappeared. Two door Series 62 were now all hardtops (including the better equipped Coupe de Ville) or convertibles. Another familiar name appeared on 1953's Series 62. The top-of-the-line subseries Eldorado was one of three specialty convertibles produced in 1953 by General Motors, the other two being the Oldsmobile 98 Fiesta and the Buick Roadmaster Skylark. The Eldorado was a limited-edition luxury convertible, and would eventually become its own series. It featured a full assortment of deluxe accessories, including wire wheels, and introduced the wraparound windshield to Cadillac standard production. Sales set a new record at 85,446.

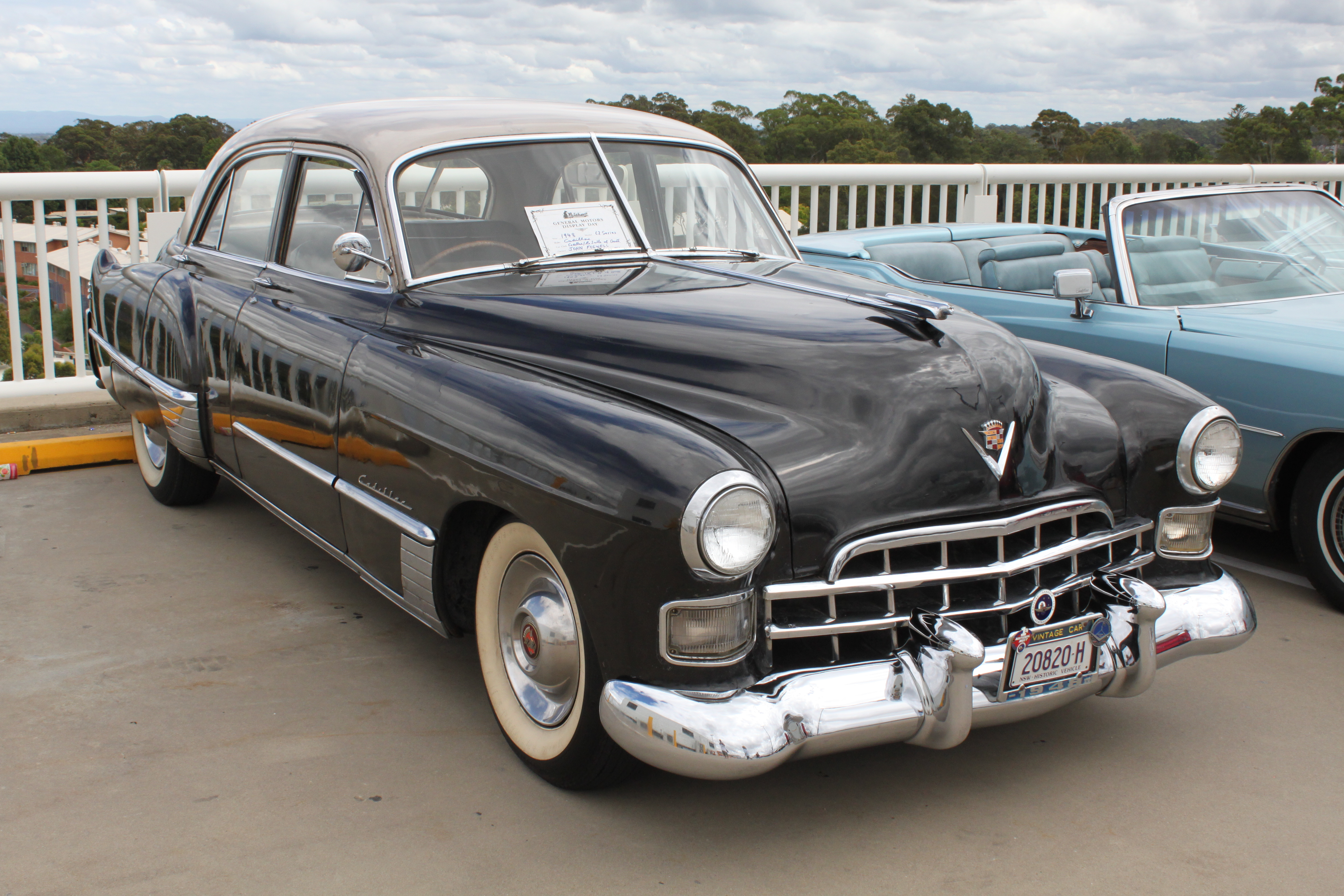
1948 Cadillac Series 62 Touring Sedan

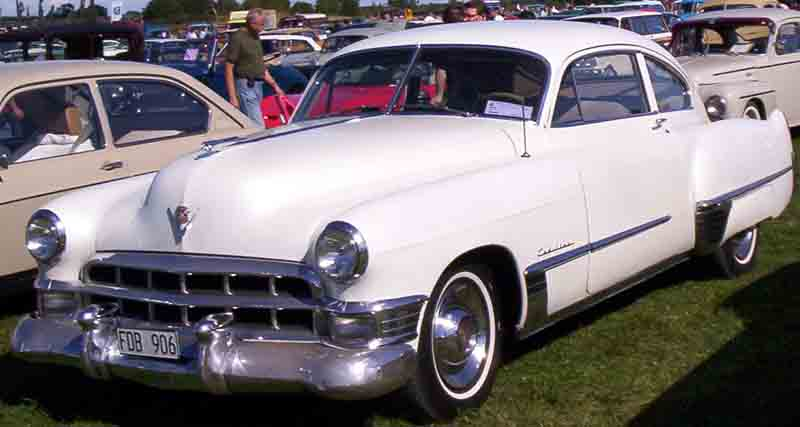
1949 Cadillac Series 62 Club Coupe

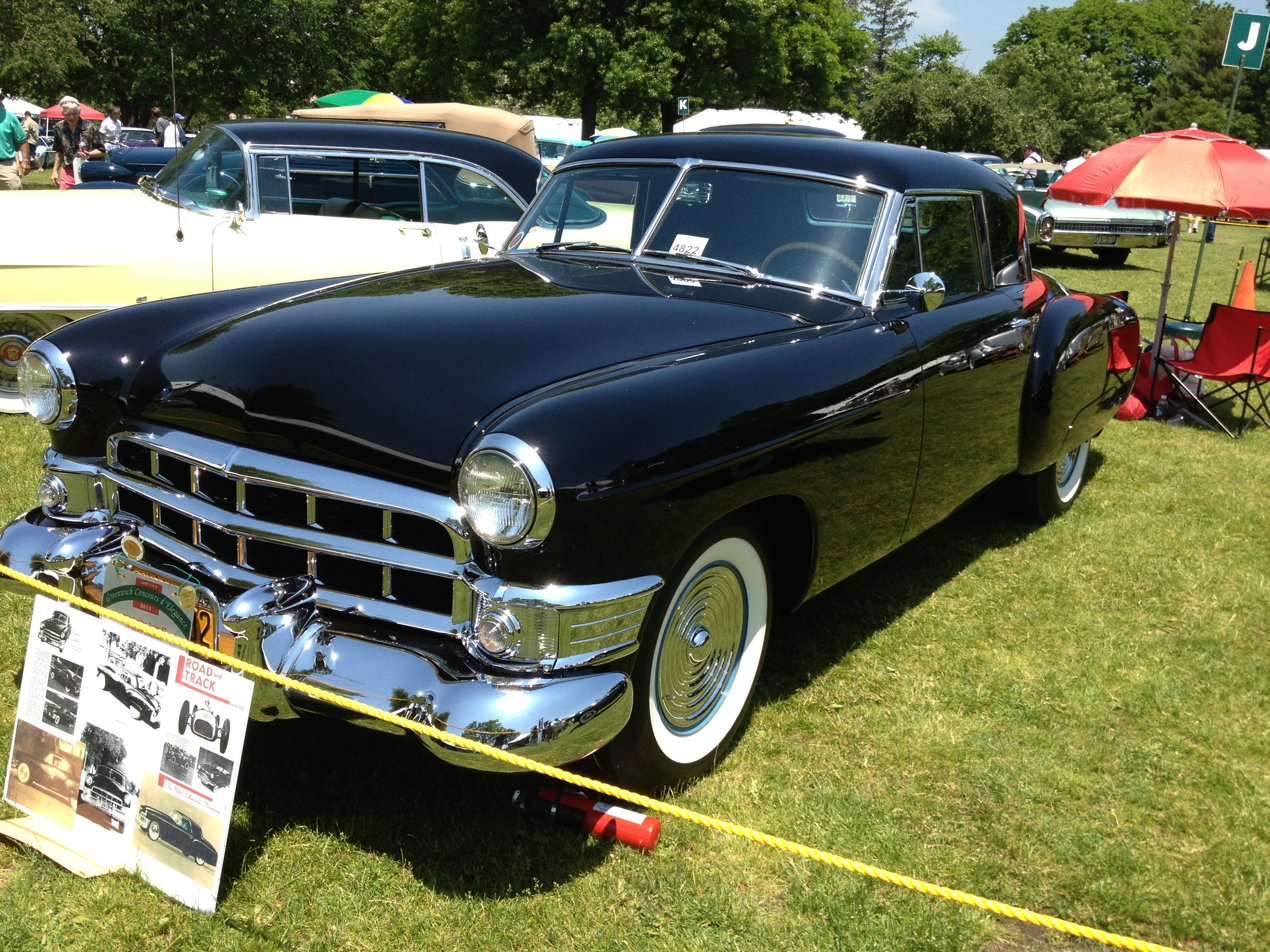
1949 Cadillac Series 62 coupe with a custom body built by Coachcraft Ltd.

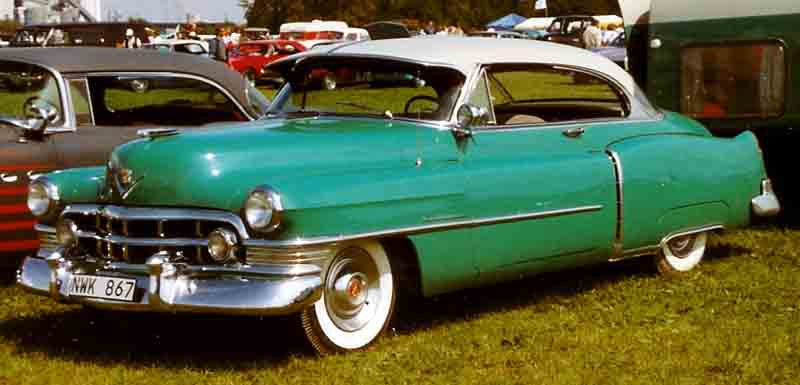
1950 Cadillac Series 62 Coupe de Ville

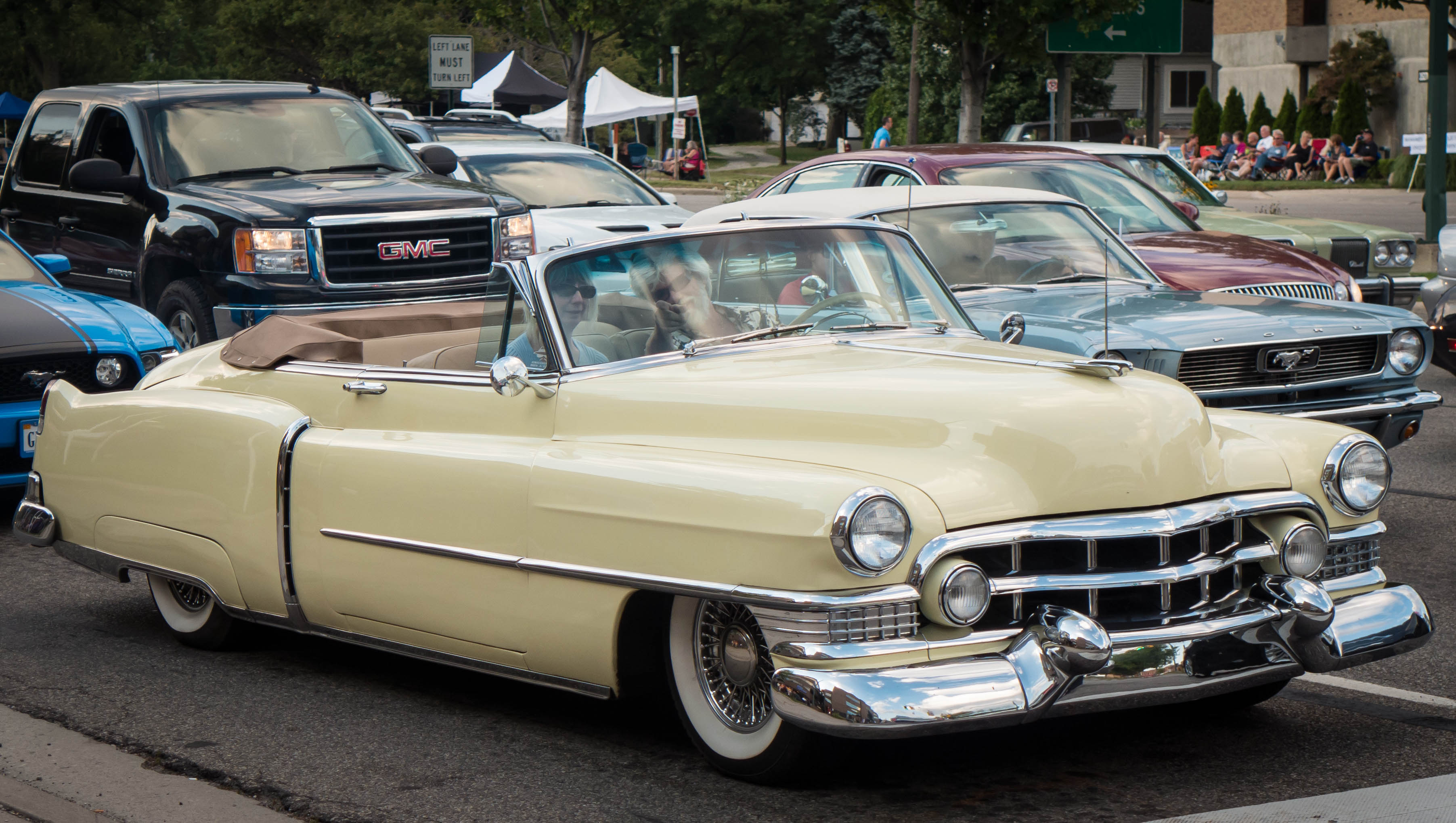
1951 Cadillac Series 62 Convertible

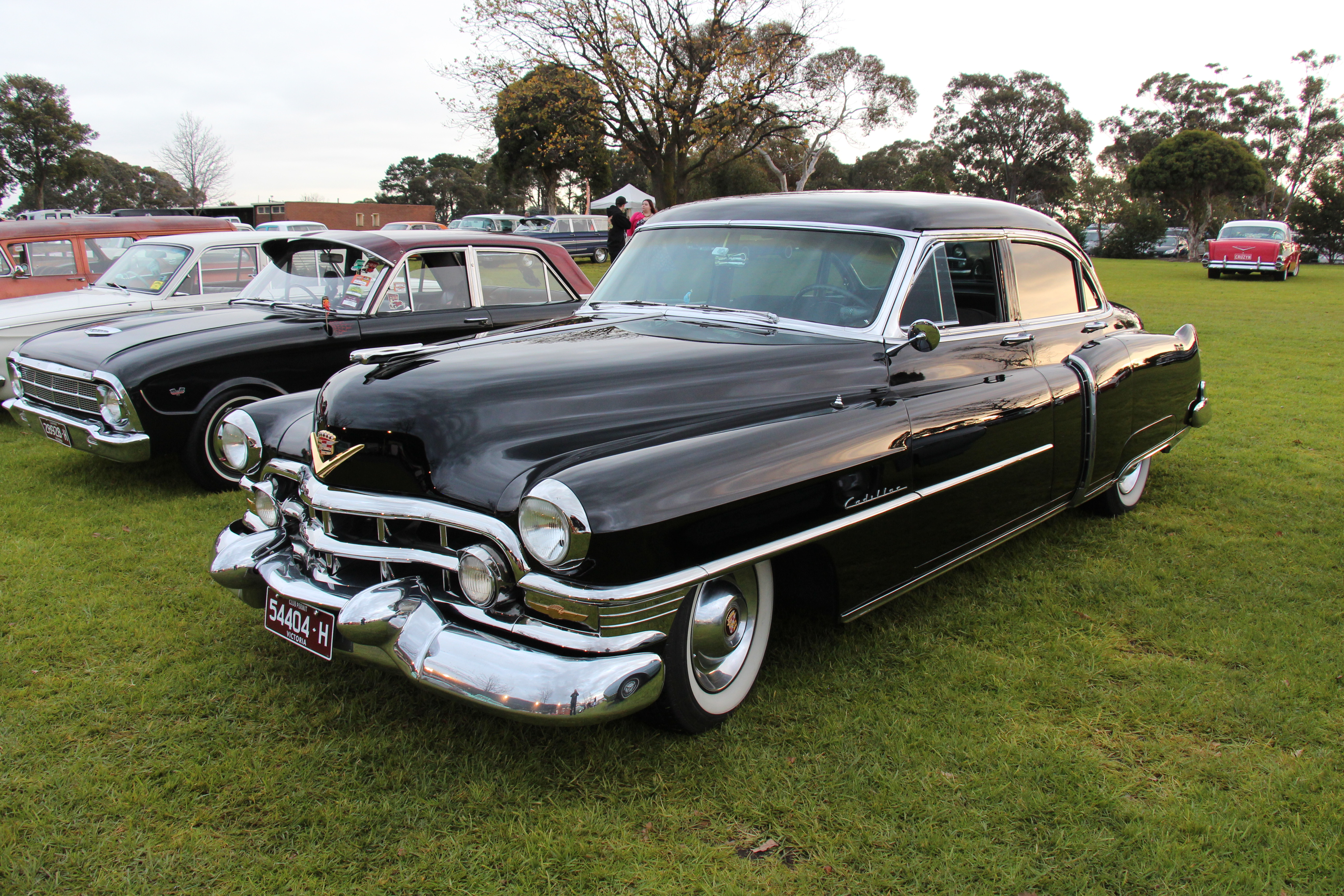
1952 Cadillac Series 62 Sedan

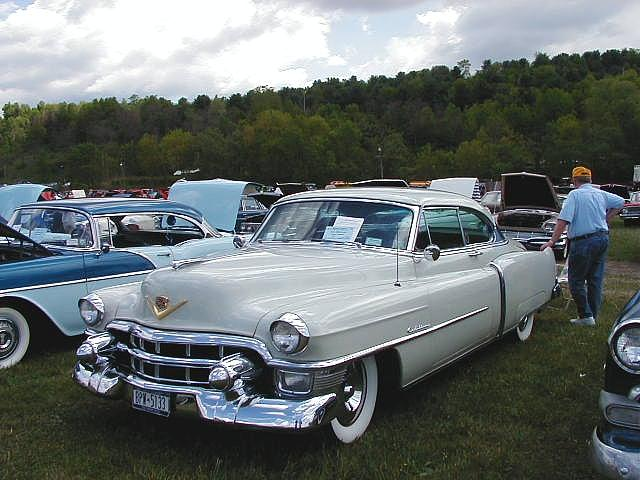
1953 Cadillac Series 62 Coupe

== Fourth generation (1954–1956) ==
Fourth generation
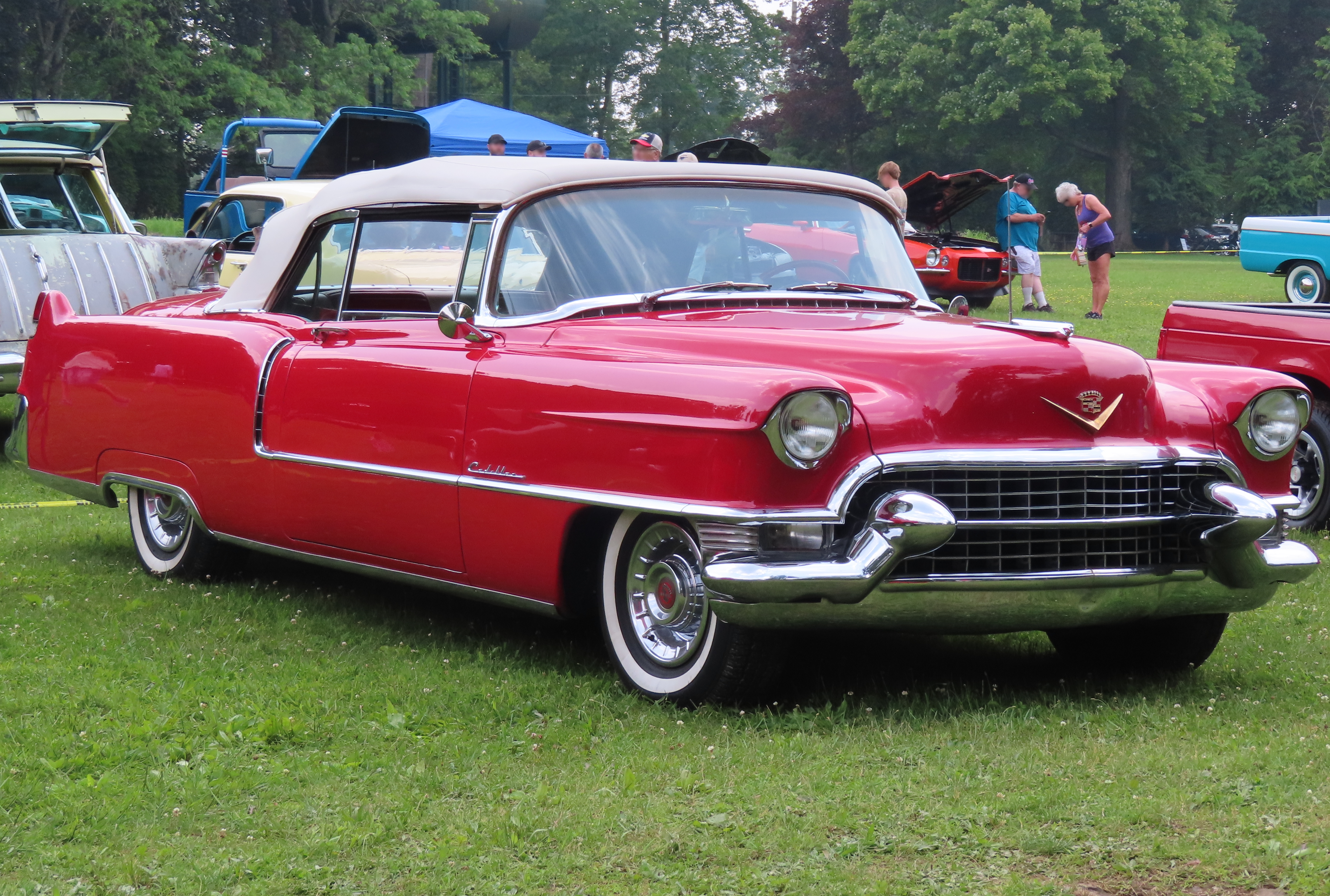
- 1955 Cadillac Series 62 Convertible

Overview
- Model years: 1954–1956
- Designer: Harley Earl

Body and chassis
- Body style: 2-door hardtop 2-door Eldorado Seville hardtop 4-door sedan 4-door Sedan de Ville hardtop 2-door convertible 2-door Eldorado convertible
- Platform: C-body
- Related: Cadillac Sixty Special; Buick Roadmaster; Buick Super; Oldsmobile 98

Powertrain
- Engine: 331 cu in (5.4 L) OHV V8; 365 cu in (6.0 L) OHV V8
- Transmission: 4-speed Hydra-Matic automatic

Dimensions
- Wheelbase: 129.0 in (3,277 mm)
- Length: 1954 4-door: 216.4 in (5,497 mm); 1954 2-door: 223.4 in (5,674 mm); 1955 4-door: 216.3 in (5,494 mm); 1955 2-door: 223.2 in (5,669 mm); 1956 4-door: 214.9 in (5,458 mm); 1956 2-door: 221.9 in (5,636 mm)
- Width: 1954: 79.6 in (2,022 mm); 1955: 79.8 in (2,027 mm); 1956: 80.1 in (2,035 mm)
- Height: 1954–55: 62.1 in (1,577 mm); 1956: 62.0 in (1,575 mm)
- Curb weight: 4,500–5,100 lb (2,000–2,300 kg)

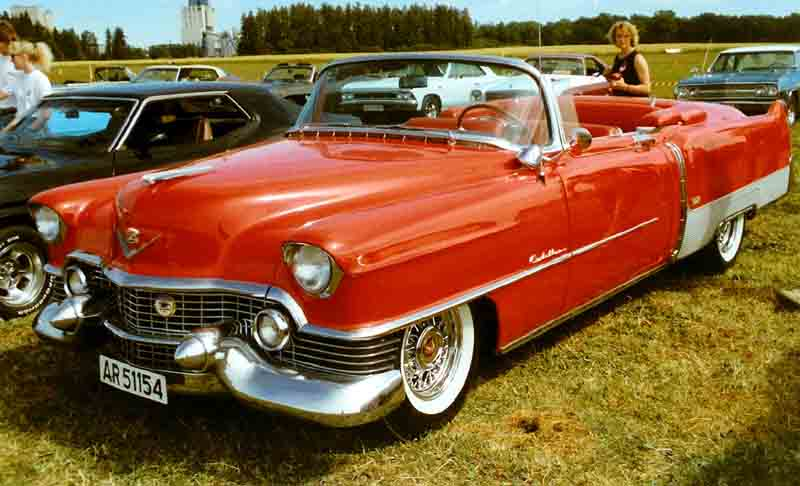
1954 Cadillac Series 62 Eldorado

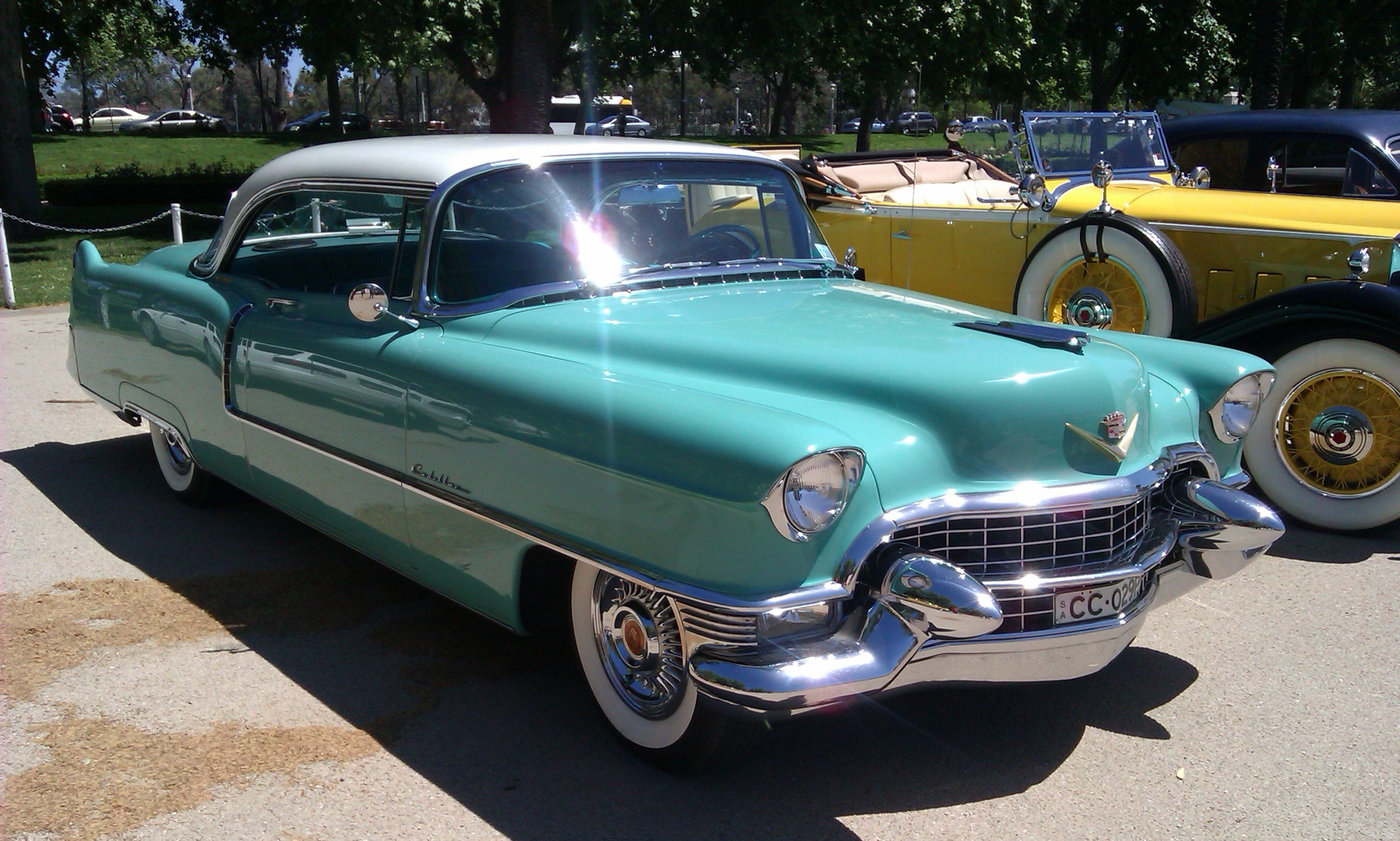
1955 Cadillac Series 62 Coupe

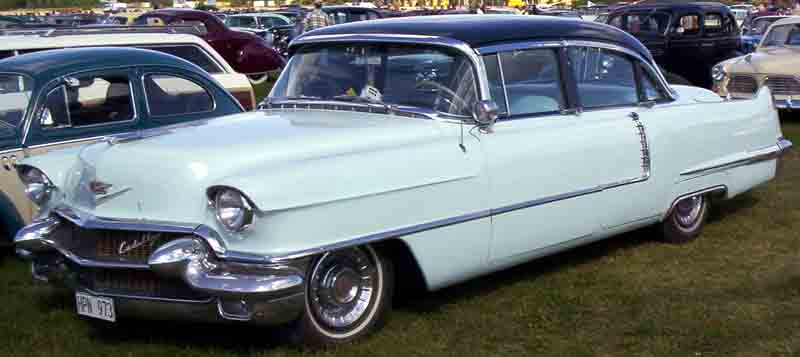
1956 Cadillac Series 62 Sedan

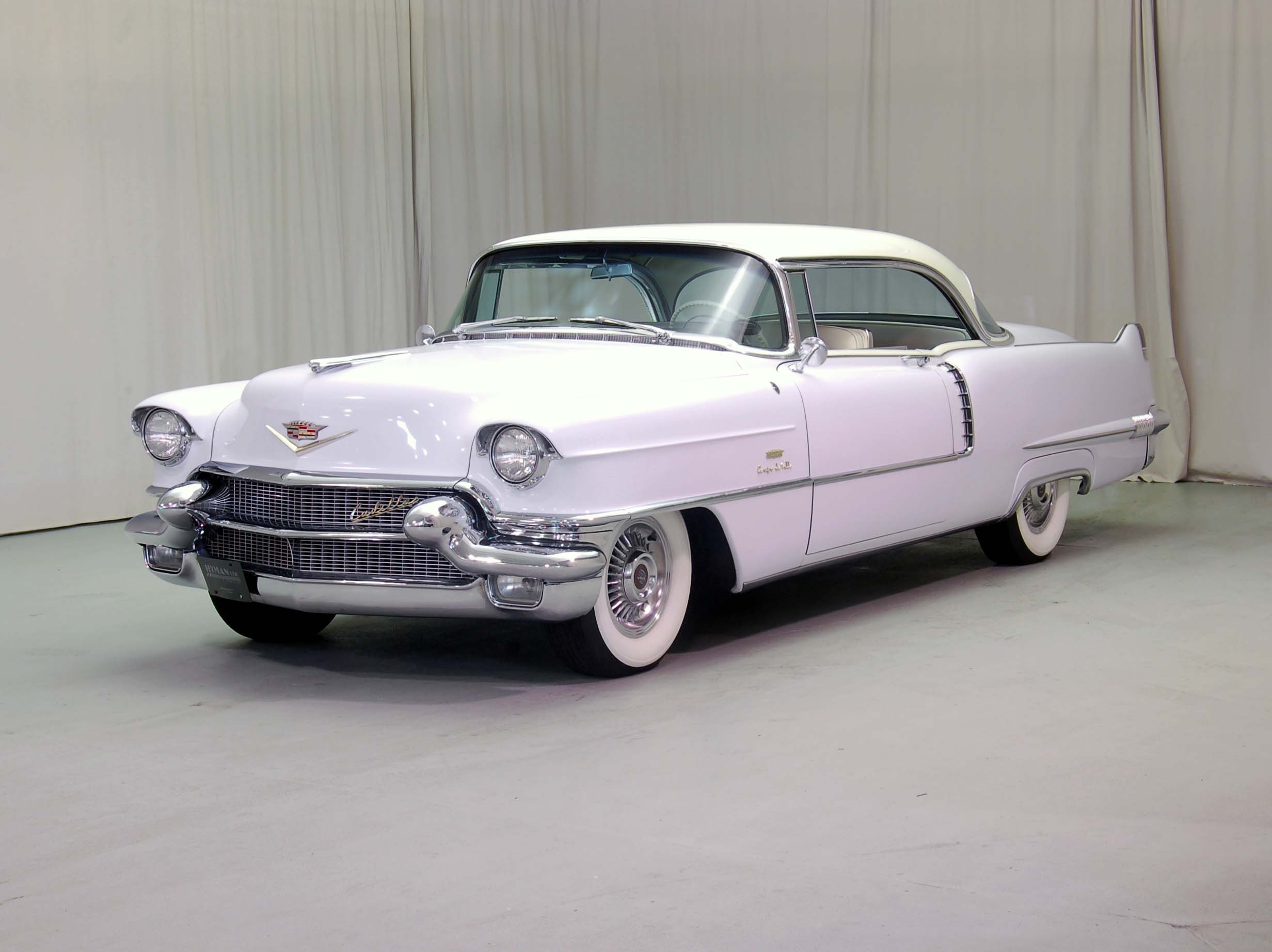
1956 Cadillac Series 62 Coupe de Ville

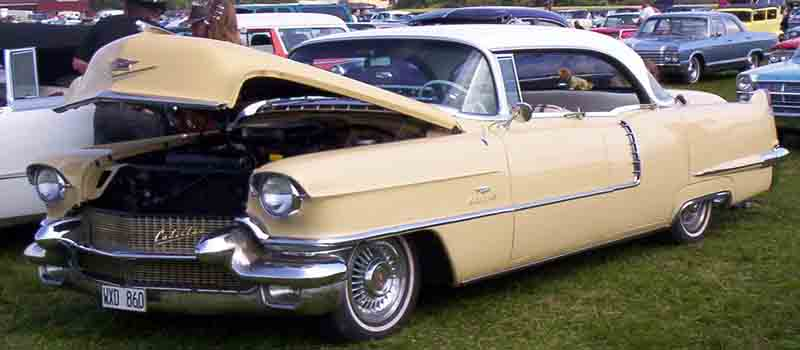
1956 Cadillac Series 62 Sedan de Ville

The Series 62 featured a lower, sleeker body, a new cellular grille insert, inverted gull-wing front bumpers, and tapered dagmar-style bumper guards. Round jet-style dual exhaust outlets were incorporated into the vertical bumper extensions, and the rear bumper was entirely redesigned. An Eldorado-style wraparound windshield was seen on all models. Sedans featured a distinctive style of window reveal molding that created a built-in sun visor effect. For coupes, a smoothly curved wraparound backlight was referred to as the "Florentine"-style rear window. A wide ventilator intake was now stretched across the base of the windshield on all body styles, and the chrome visored headlamp look was emphasized. The Series 62 could be distinguished by the lack of rear fender louvers. V-shaped ornaments and crests were used in the hood and deck, and there were full-length body underscores in bright metal. Coupe de Ville script was seen on rear corner pillars of the luxury hardtop, which also had wider sill moldings. The Eldorados had golden identifying crests centered directly behind the air-slot fender breaks and wide fluted beauty panels to decorate the lower rear body sides. These panels were made of extruded aluminum and also appeared on a unique one-of-a-kind Eldorado coupe built for the Reynolds Aluminum Corporation. Also included in the production Eldorado convertible were monogram plates on the doors, wire wheels, and custom interior trimmings with the Cadillac crest embossed on the seat bolsters. Automatic windshield washers, power steering, a 12-volt electrical system, and aluminum alloy pistons were added to the standard equipment list for the first time this year. Power steering, windows, seats, and auto-dimming headlights were optional. A parking brake release reminder light was new. Popular Mechanics rated the 0-60 mph time as 17.3 seconds. Air conditioning was provided by Frigidaire optionally on sedans and hardtops, which consisted of a self-contained unit that was retrofitted at the customer's request.

In 1955, the grille was redesigned with wider spaces between the blades, and the parking lamps were repositioned beneath directly below the headlights. On the sides of the body the rub-rail moldings formed a right angle with the vertical trim on the rear doors or fenders. This accentuated the character line in the sheet metal. The Florentine curve rear window treatment was adopted for sedans. Three chrome moldings bordered the rear license plate on either side, and deck lid decorations consisted of a V-shaped ornament and a Cadillac crest. The Coupe de Ville had a golden script nameplate at the upper body belt just forward of the rear window pillar. The Eldorado sport convertible featured extras such as wide chrome body belt moldings, a distinctive rear fender design, with twin round taillights halfway up the fenders and flatter pointed tailfins. Tubeless tires were a new standard Cadillac feature. Sales reached a record 118,190, accounting for nearly 84% of all Cadillacs sold. Standard equipment included back-up lights, turn signals, and automatic transmission.

In 1956, there was a new grille, with finer textured insert, and the repositioning of the parking lights in the bumpers, below the wing guards. Buyers were given an option of the standard satin finish grille or an optional gold finish. Cadillac script was found on the left side. A narrow chrome molding and nine vertical louvers were seen. The Coupe de Ville had a model nameplate and a Cadillac crest on the sides of the front fenders. The Coupe de Ville was joined by the Series 62 Sedan de Ville, Cadillac's first standard production 4-door hardtop. Similarly to the Coupe de Ville, it was also more expensive and more luxuriously trimmed that the standard 4-door Series 62. With 41,732 sold, it also easily outsold the Series 62 sedan in its very first year. Given their sales success, it was only natural that the Coupe de Ville and Sedan de Ville were moved to their own separate series in 1959, the Series 6300, being joined by a De Ville convertible in 1964. The Eldorado subseries also gained a new bodystyle, a 2-door hardtop called the Seville. An Eldorado script finally appeared with fender crest on the car which was further distinguished by a twin hood ornament. Extras featured on the Eldorado convertible, now known as the Biarritz in order to distinguish it from the Seville, were a ribbed chrome saddle molding extending from the windshield to the rear window pillar along the beltline and flat, pointed rear fender fins. Power steering was now standard. The turning circle was 43.5 ft. wide and ground clearance is 8.25 inches. Popular Mechanics rated a 0-60 mph time of 12.0 seconds, fuel economy for a traffic route at 8.3mpg, and a very accurate speedometer.

Series 62 sales reached an all-time record in 1956 at 134,502 units, accounting for an all-time record 86.4% of all Cadillacs sold. This included 66,818 De Villes and 6050 Eldorados.

In a Popular Mechanics survey of 1956 Series 62 owners, the two most serious complaints: Was one, with 23.7% responding to the survey, slipshod workmanship during assembly; and two, with 22.7% of responses, were transmission problems. The major items they liked, with 35% of responses, was one, riding quality; and two, with 32.7% of responses, power and performance.

== Fifth generation (1957–1958) ==
Fifth generation
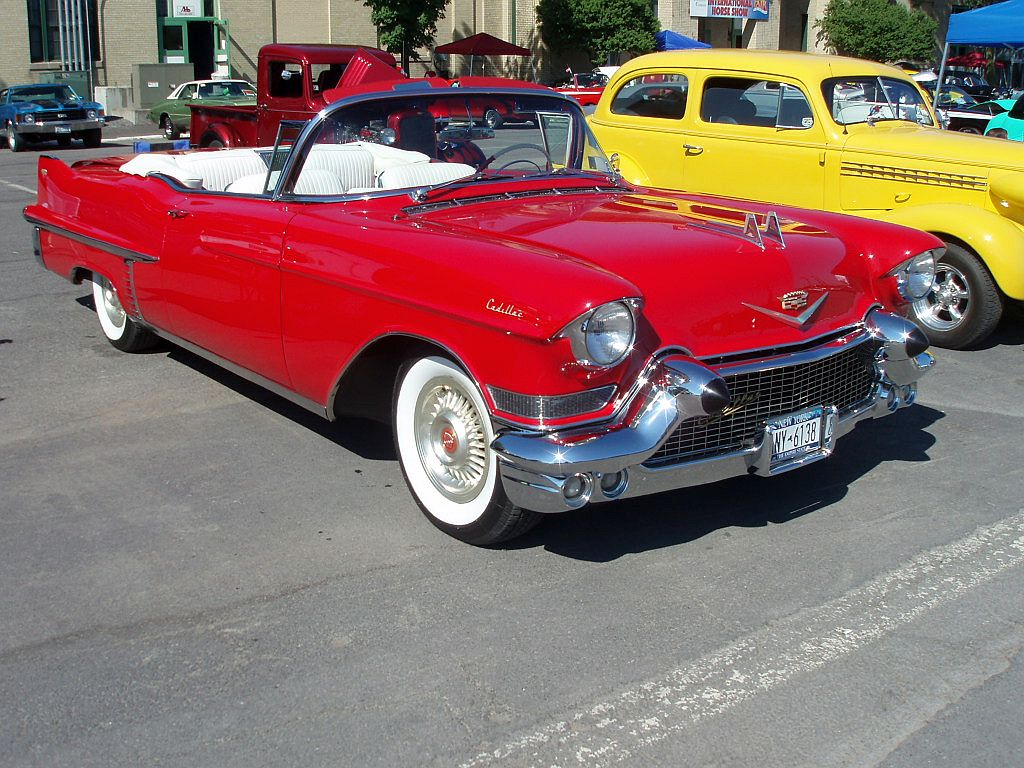
- 1957 Cadillac Series 62 Convertible

Overview
- Model years: 1957–1958
- Designer: Harley Earl

Body and chassis
- Body style: 2-door hardtop 2-door Eldorado Seville hardtop 4-door hardtop 2-door convertible 2-door Eldorado Biarritz convertible
- Platform: C-body
- Related: Cadillac Sixty Special; Buick Limited; Buick Roadmaster; Buick Super; Oldsmobile 98

Powertrain
- Engine: 365 cu in (6.0 L) OHV V8
- Transmission: 4-speed Hydra-Matic automatic

Dimensions
- Wheelbase: 129.5 in (3,289 mm)
- Length: 1957 4-door: 215.9 in (5,484 mm); 1957 2-door (except for Eldorado Biarritz and Seville): 220.9 in (5,611 mm); 1957 Eldorado Biarritz and Seville: 222.1 in (5,641 mm); 1958 short deck 4-door: 216.8 in (5,507 mm); 1958 2-door (except for Eldorado Biarritz and Seville): 221.8 in (5,634 mm); 1958 4-door extended deck and Sedan de Ville: 225.3 in (5,723 mm); 1958 Eldorado Biarritz and Seville: 223.4 in (5,674 mm)
- Width: 80.0 in (2,032 mm)
- Height: 59.1 in (1,501 mm)
- Curb weight: 4,800–5,300 lb (2,200–2,400 kg)

For 1957, a tubular X-frame without side rails was adopted, which Cadillac claimed resulted in lower body without a loss of usable space and increased torsional strength. These frames gained controversy as being unsafe, and other manufactures, such as Ford, touted that their "perimeter" frames were safer. Front end styling was marked by rubber bumper guard tips and dual circular lamps set into the lower bumper section. Side trim was revised and a dual taillight theme was used. Identifying the standard 62 models were bright metal moldings, just forward of the rear wheel openings, highlighted by seven horizontal wind slits. At the upper end this fender brake trim joined a horizontal molding that ran along a conical flare extending towards both taillamps. A crest medallion was seen on the forward angled rear fins. De Villes had special nameplates on the front fenders. Series 62 Eldorados (as distinct from the Series 70 Eldorado Brougham) were further distinguished by the model name above a V-shaped rear deck ornament and on the front fenders. The rear fender and deck contour was trimmed with broad, sculptured stainless steel beauty panels. Also seen were "shark" style fins pointing towards the back of the cars. A three section built in front bumper was another exclusive trait of the Series 62 Eldorados, which came with a long list of standard features. A new body style was added to the subseries, a 4-door Eldorado Sedan Seville, but only four were actually sold, and it was cancelled the following year.

For 1958, there was a new grille featuring multiple round "cleats" at the intersection of the horizontal and vertical members. The grille insert was wider and new bumper guards were positioned lower to the parking lamps. New dual headlamps were used and small chrome fins decorated the front fenders. Tailfins were less pronounced and trim attachments were revised. The word Cadillac appeared in block letters on the fins of base models. On the sides of the car were five longer horizontal wind splits ahead of the unskirted rear wheel housing and front fender horizontal mouldings with crests placed above the trailing edge and no rocker sill trim. The convertible and the De Villes used solid metal trim on the lower half of the conical projection flares, while other models had a thin ridge molding in the same location. On Series 62 Eldorados, a V-shaped ornament and model identification script were mounted to the deck lid. Series 62 Eldorados also had ten vertical chevron slashes ahead of the open rear wheel housings and crest medallions on the flank of the tailfins. Broad, sculptured beauty panels decorated the lower rear quarters on all Series 62 Eldorados and extended around the wheel opening to stretch along the body sills. Standard equipment on all Series 62s was the same as the previous year. All new was an extended deck Series 62 sedan which, along with the Series 62 Sedan deVille, stretched 8.5 inches longer than the regular 4-door Series 62, and a special order Series 62 Eldorado Seville of which only one was actually built. Excluding export sedans and chassis only, the Series 62 offered an all-time record of nine bodystyles this year. The infamous Cadillac Air-Suspension was optional. The following year De Ville and Eldorado were spun off onto their own series.

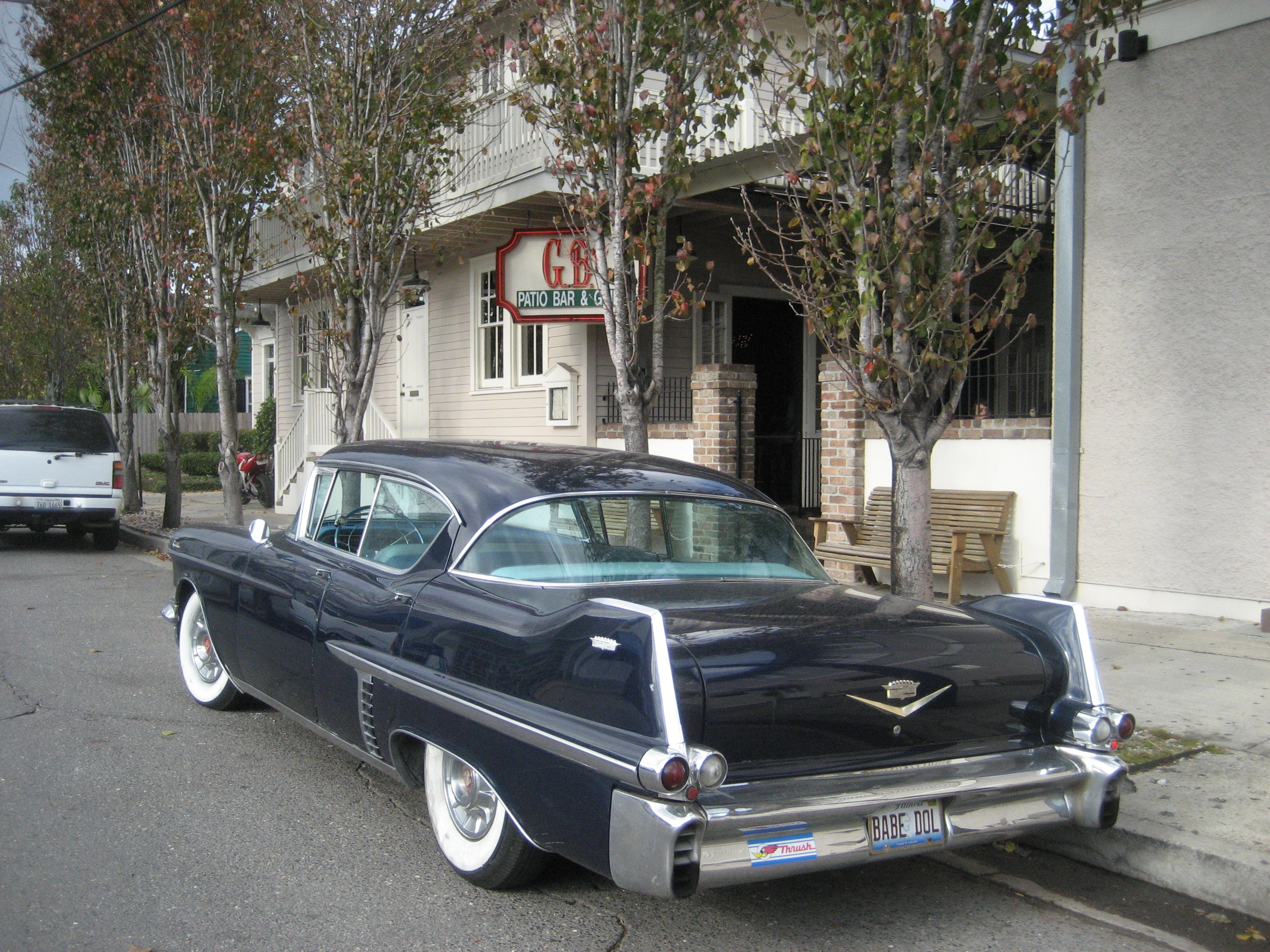
1957 Cadillac Series 62 Sedan

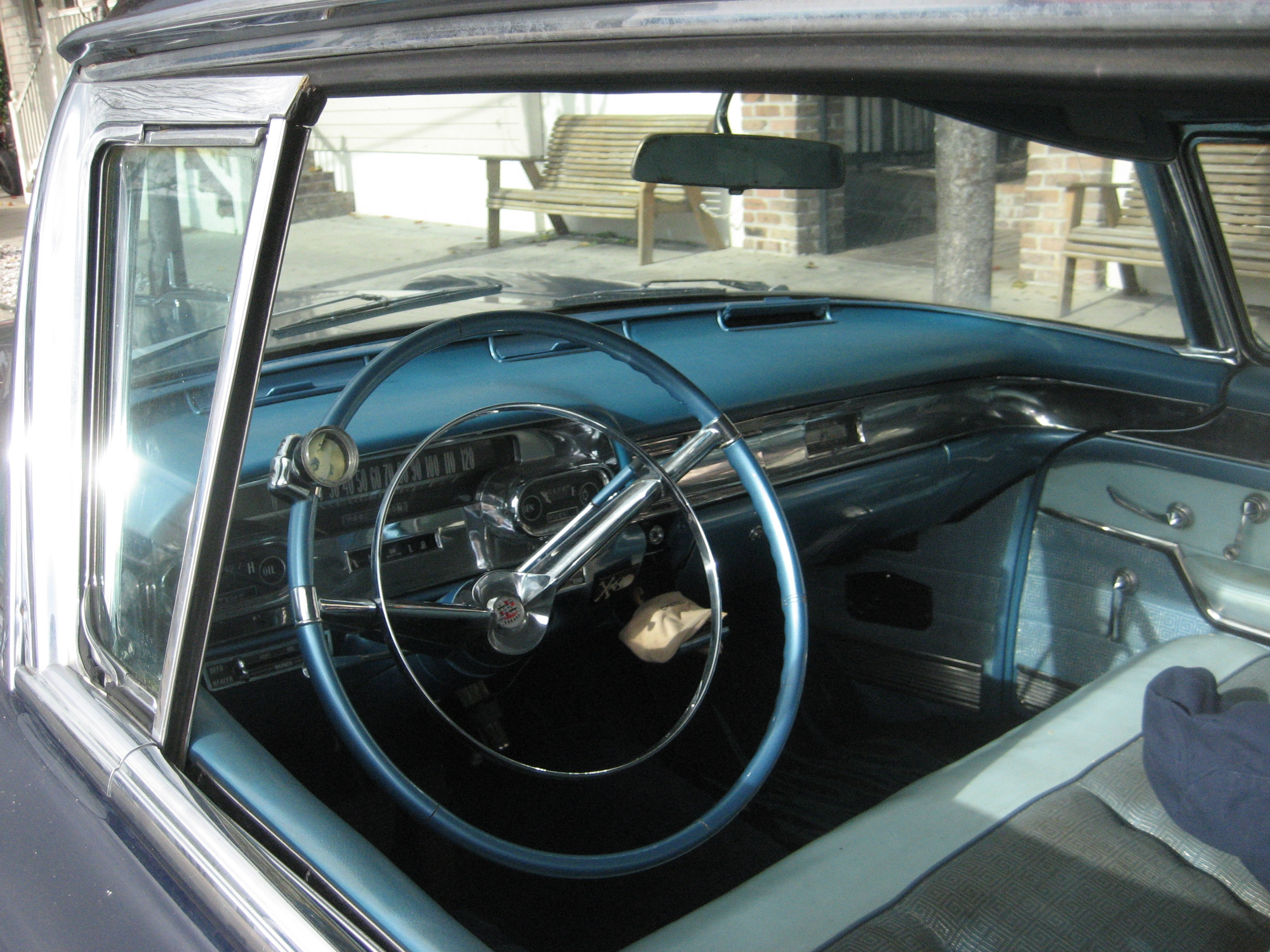
1957 Cadillac Series 62 Sedan interior

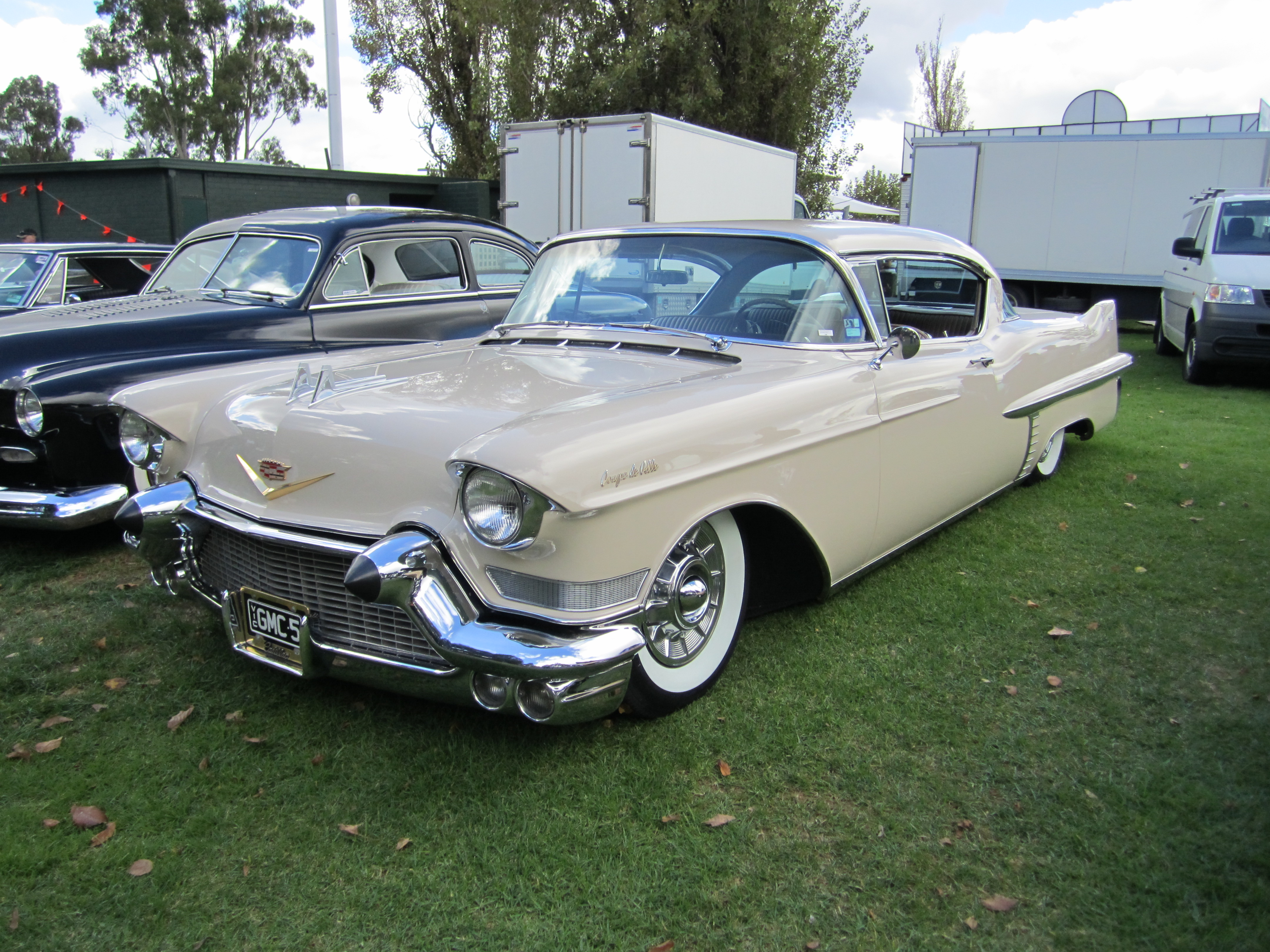
1957 Cadillac Series 62 Coupe de Ville

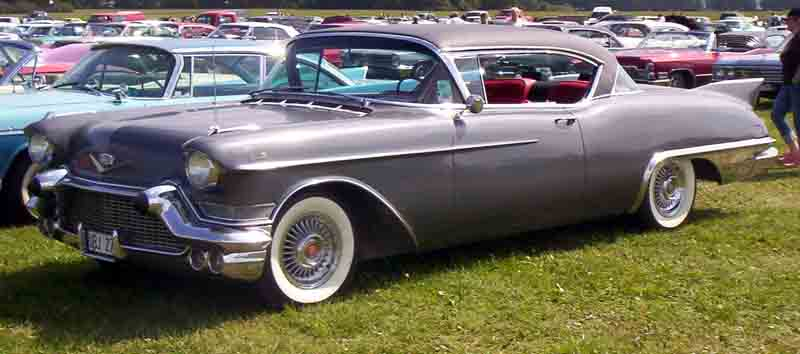
1957 Cadillac Series 62 Eldorado Seville

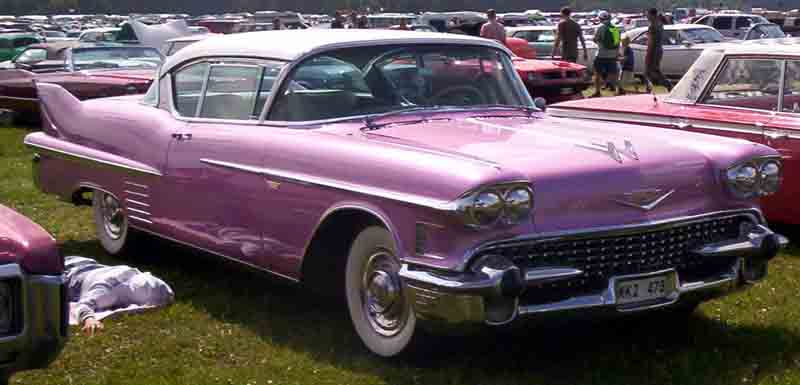
1958 Cadillac Series 62 coupe

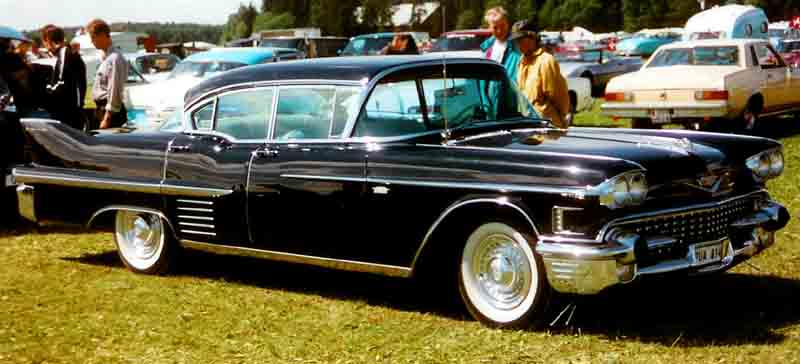
1958 Cadillac Series 62 Sedan de Ville

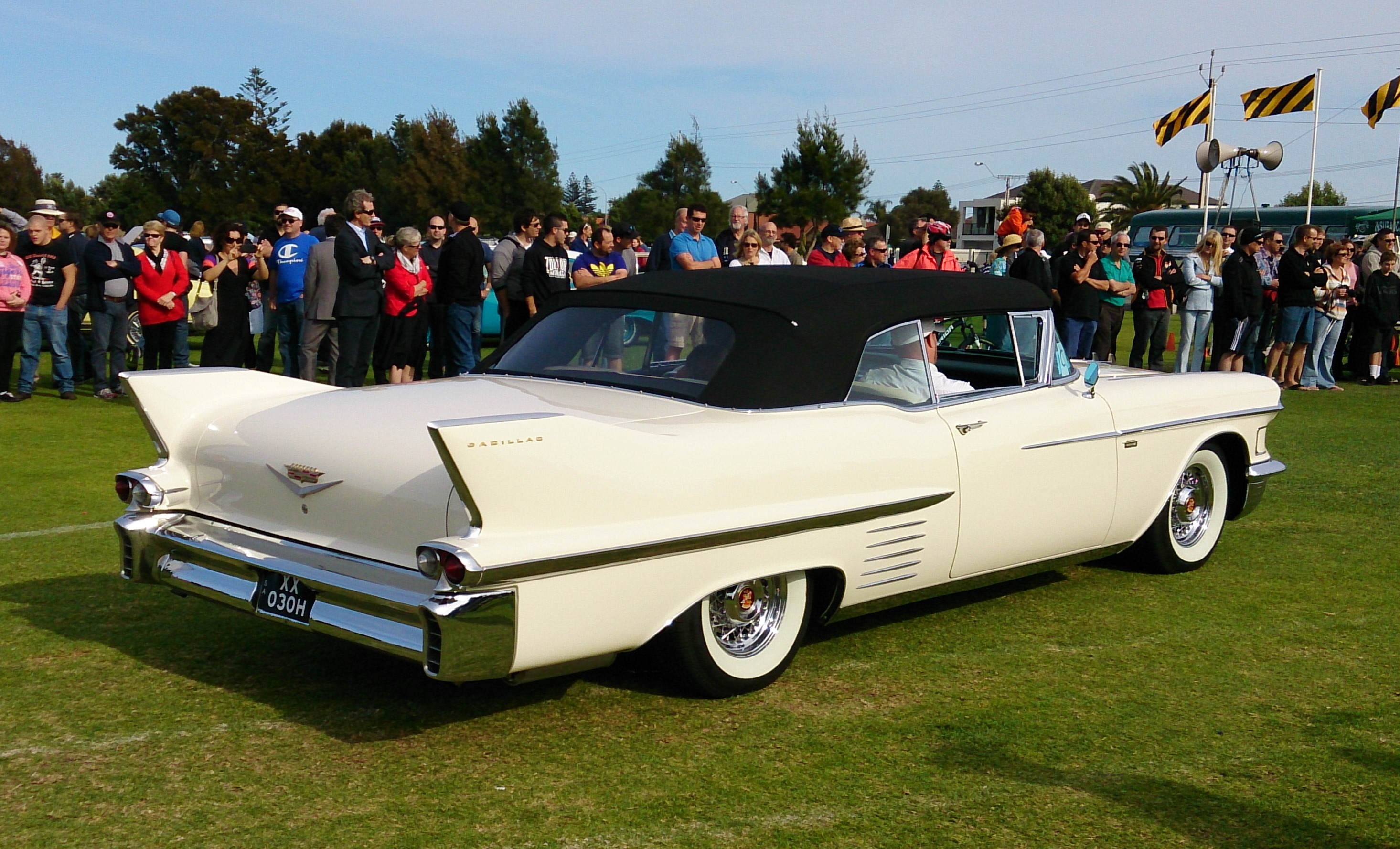
1958 Cadillac Series 62 Convertible

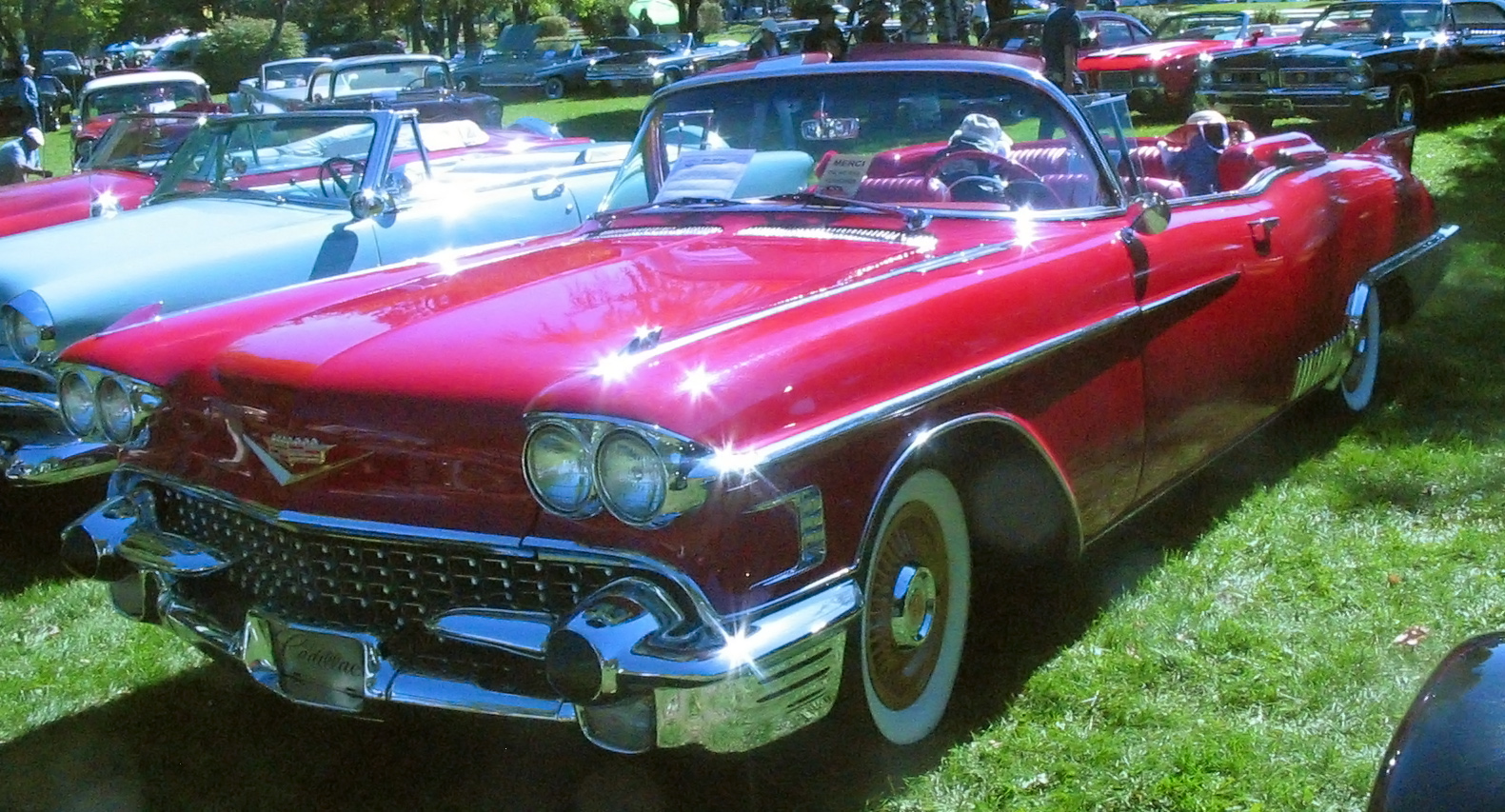
1958 Cadillac Series 62 Eldorado Biarritz

== Sixth generation (1959–1960) ==
Sixth generation
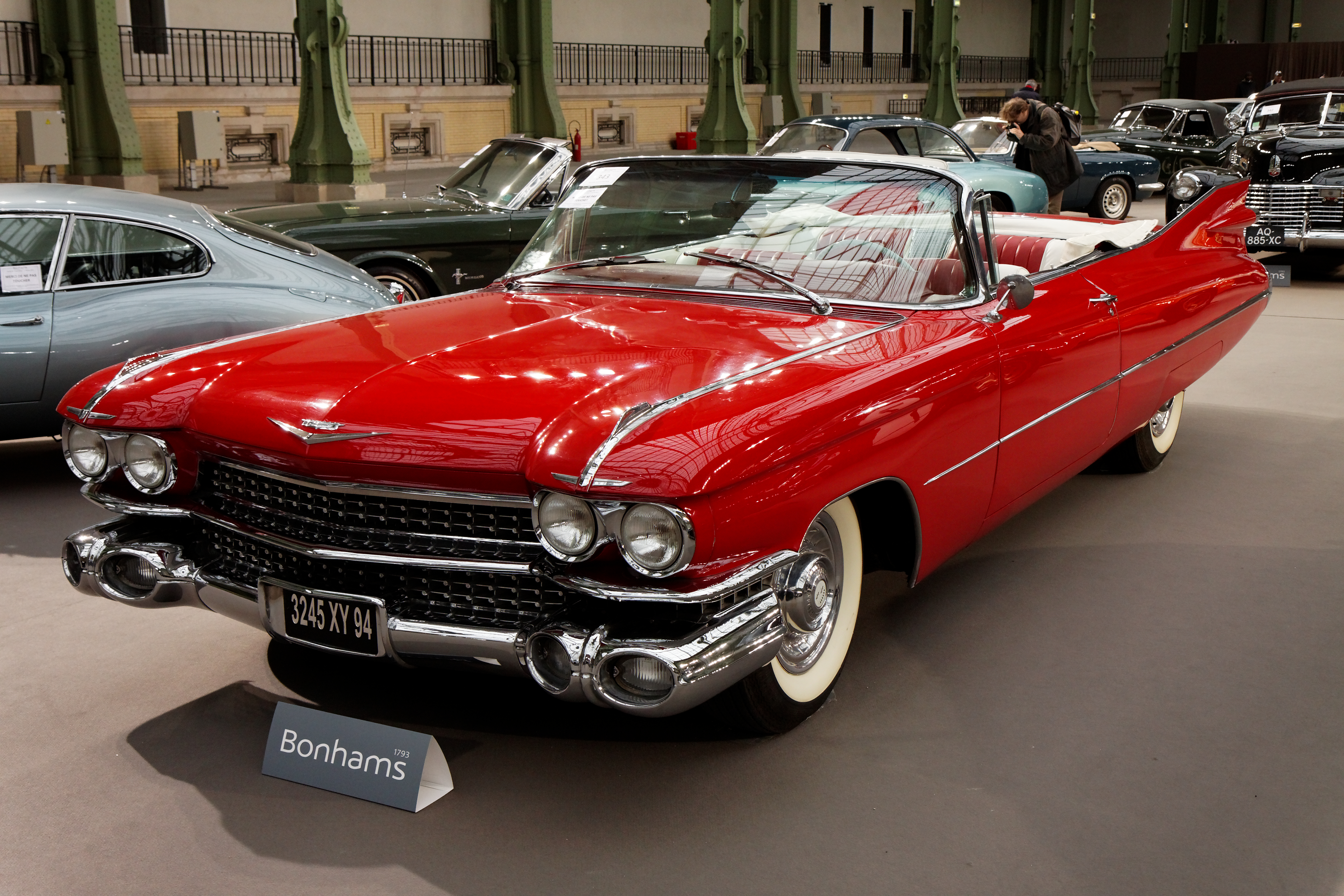
- 1959 Cadillac Series 62 Convertible

Overview
- Model years: 1959–1960
- Designer: Bill Mitchell

Body and chassis
- Body style: 2-door hardtop 4-door 6-window hardtop 4-door 4-window hardtop 2-door convertible
- Platform: C-body
- Related: Cadillac Eldorado; Cadillac Sixty Special; Cadillac De Ville; Buick Electra; Oldsmobile 98

Powertrain
- Engine: 390 cu in (6.4 L) OHV V8
- Transmission: 4-speed Hydra-Matic automatic

Dimensions
- Wheelbase: 130.0 in (3,302 mm)
- Length: 225.0 in (5,715 mm)
- Width: 1959: 80.2 in (2,037 mm); 1960: 79.9 in (2,029 mm)
- Height: 56.2 in (1,427 mm)
- Curb weight: 4,900–5,100 lb (2,200–2,300 kg)

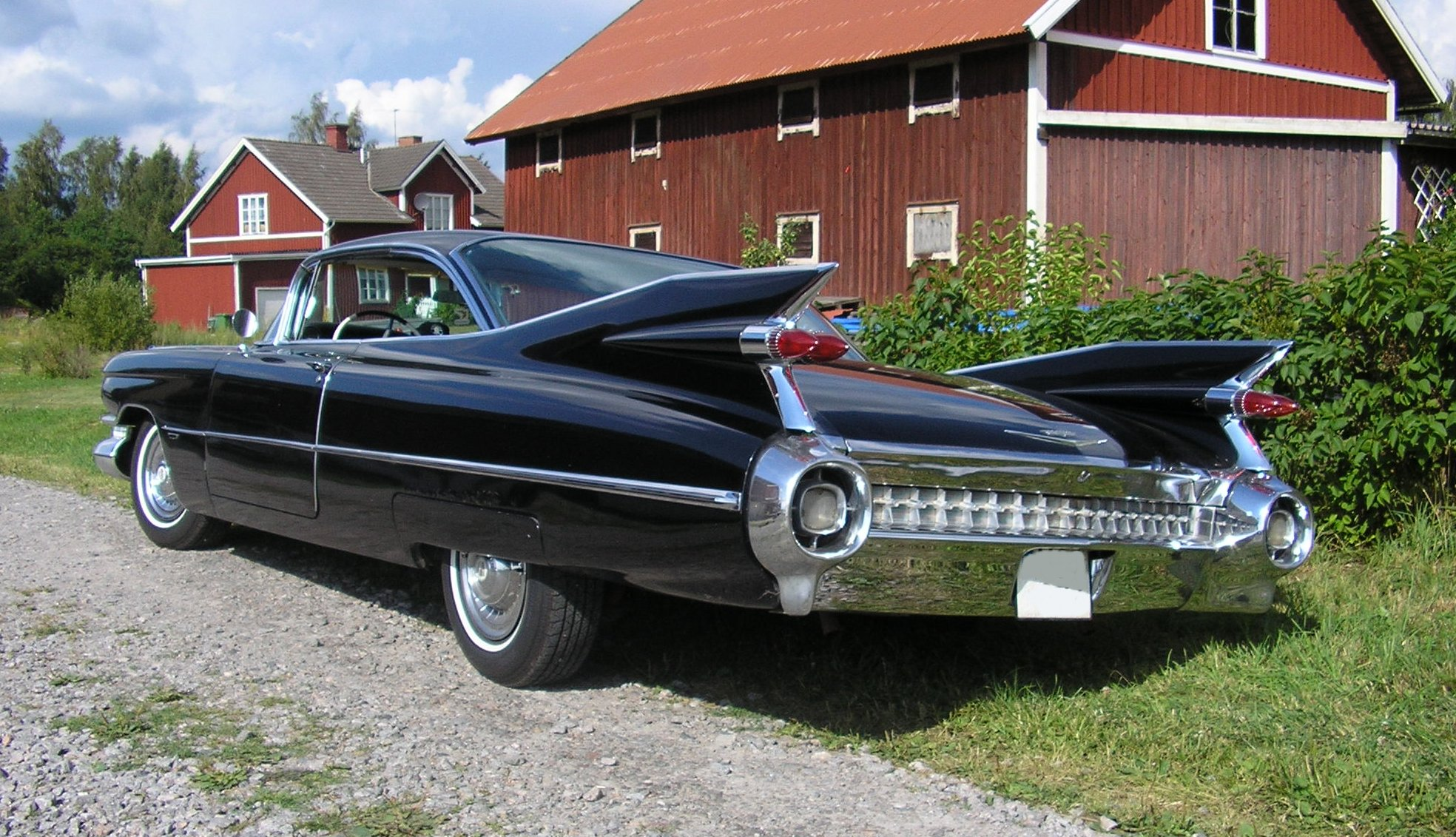
1959 Cadillac Series 62 coupe

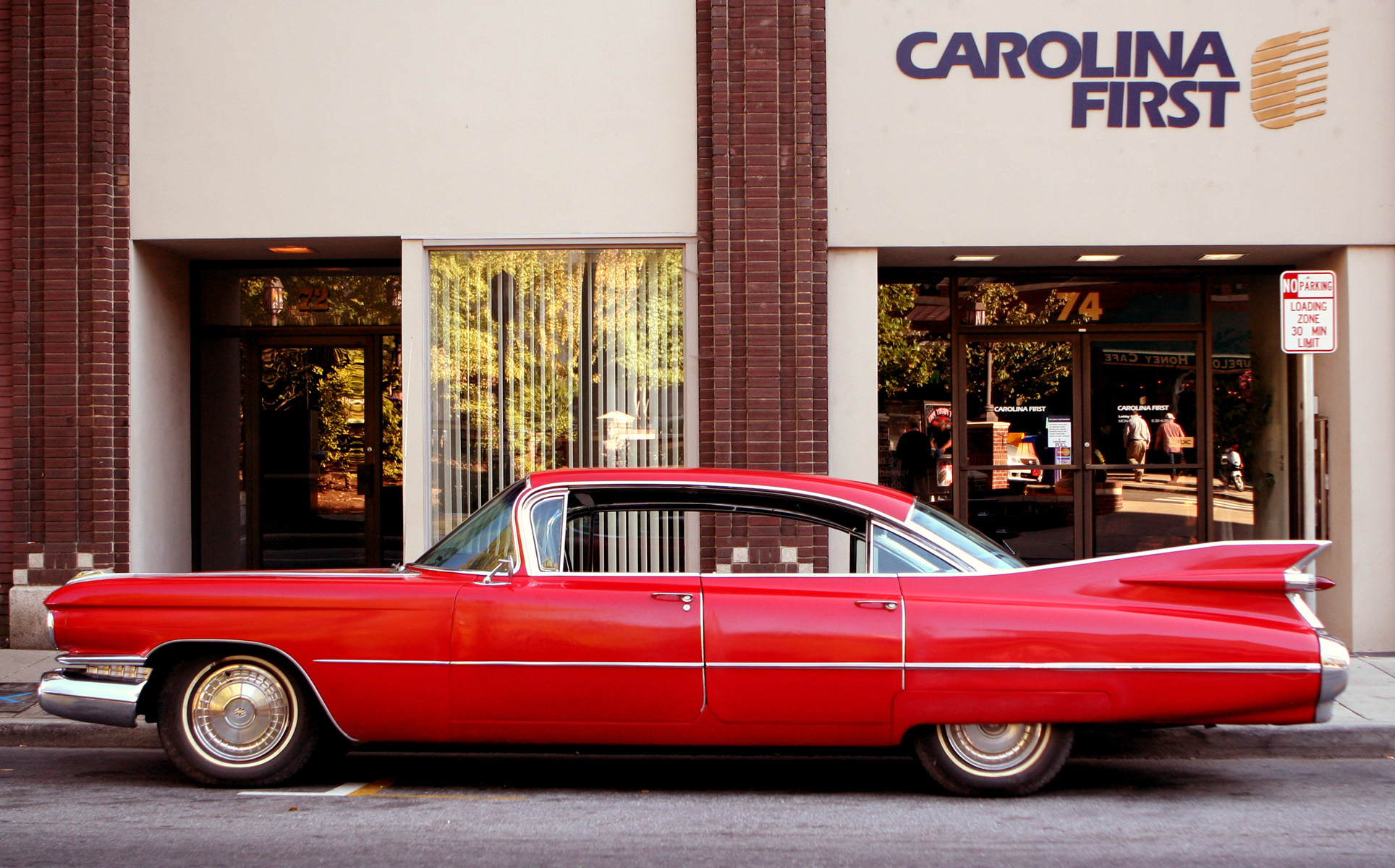
1959 Cadillac Series 62 6-window sedan

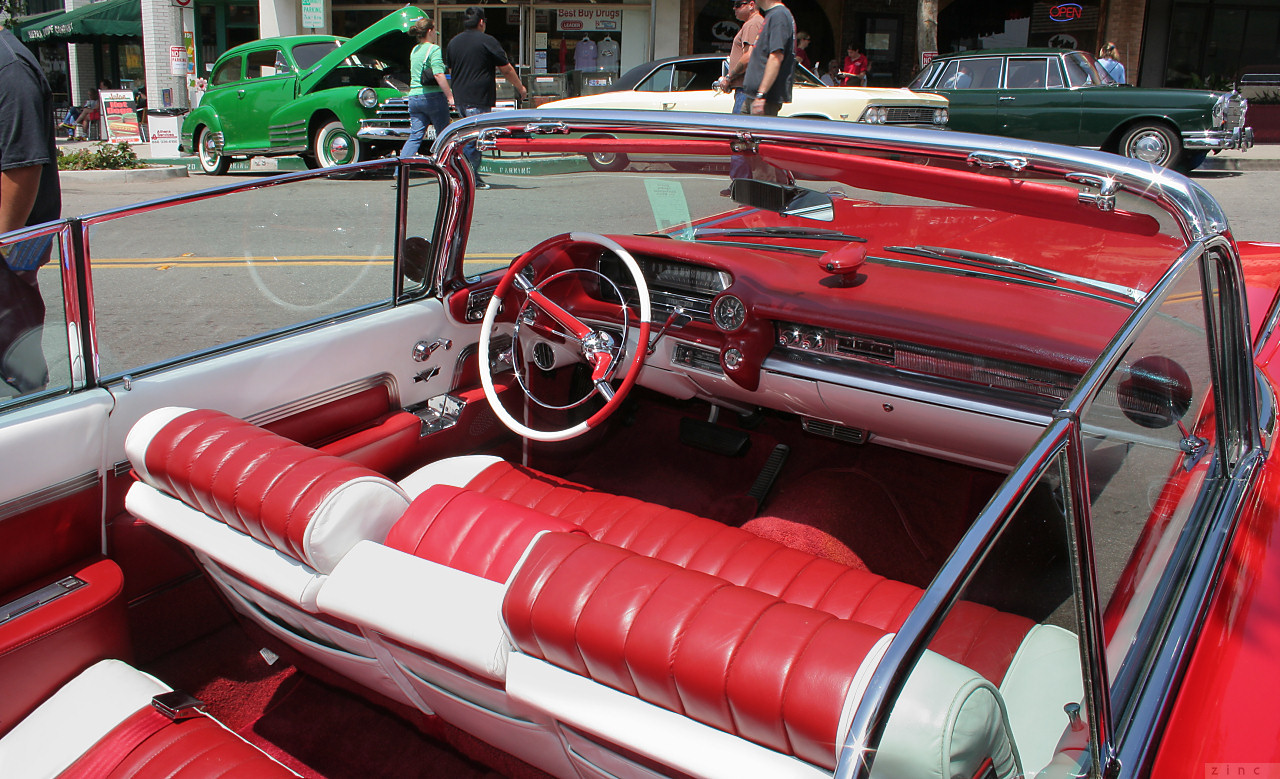
1959 Cadillac Series 62 convertible interior

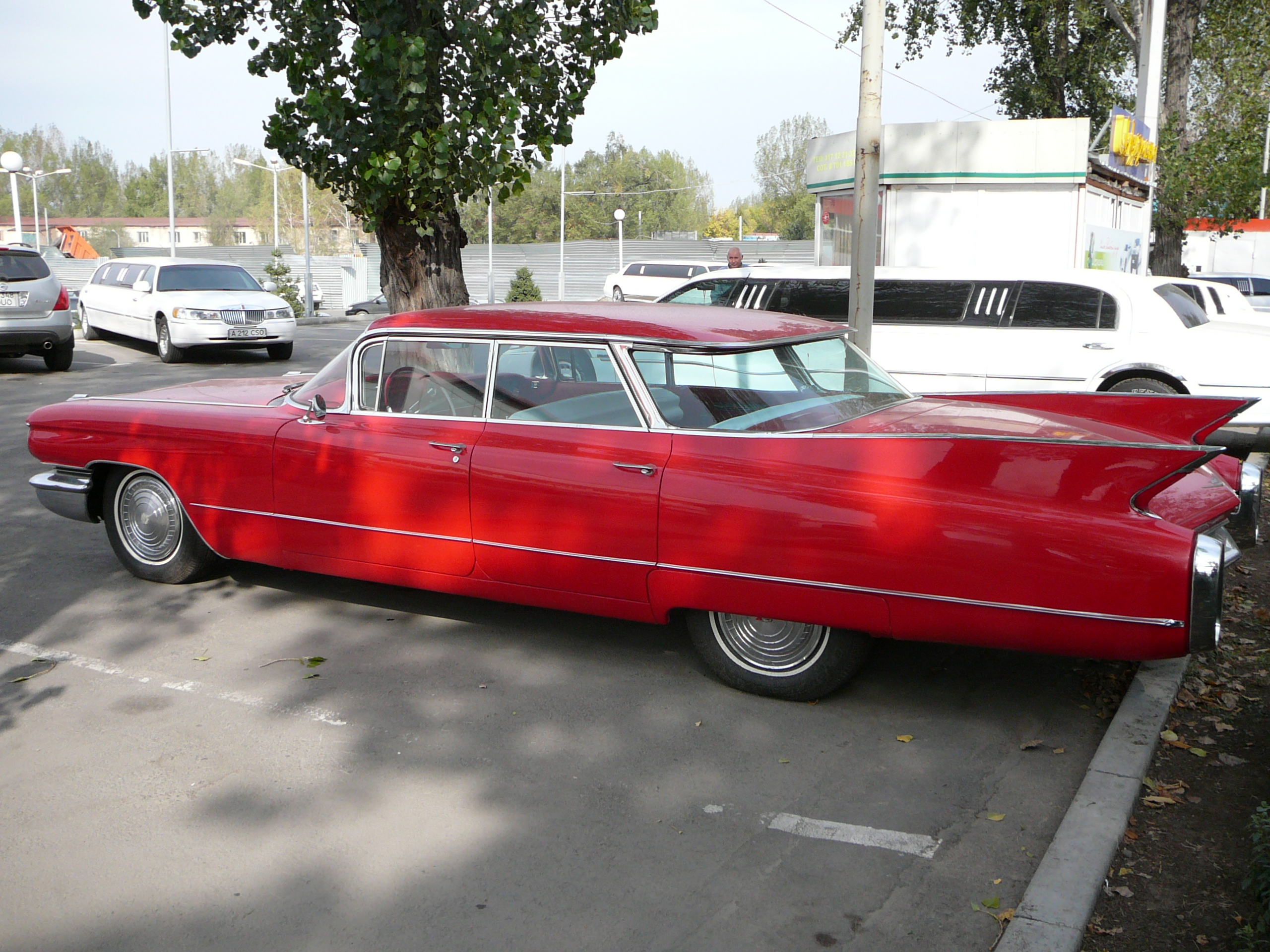
1960 Cadillac Series 62 4-window sedan

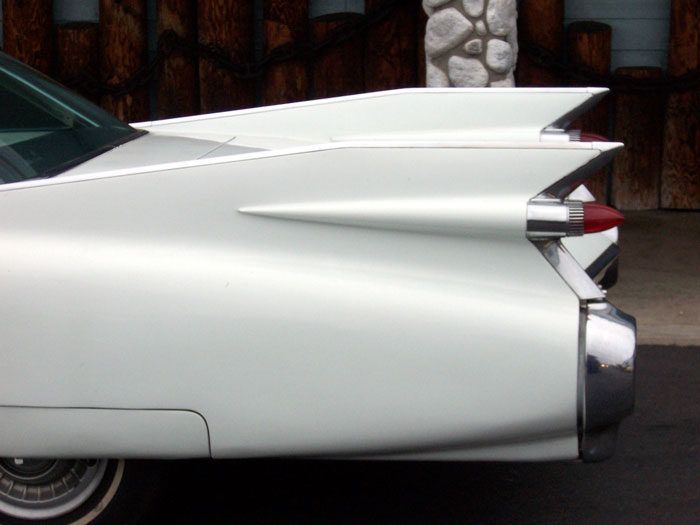
With the exception of the Eldorado Brougham, 1959 Cadillacs were famous for high tailfins with double tail lights in mid-fin. This marked the peak of 1950s car tail fin extension.

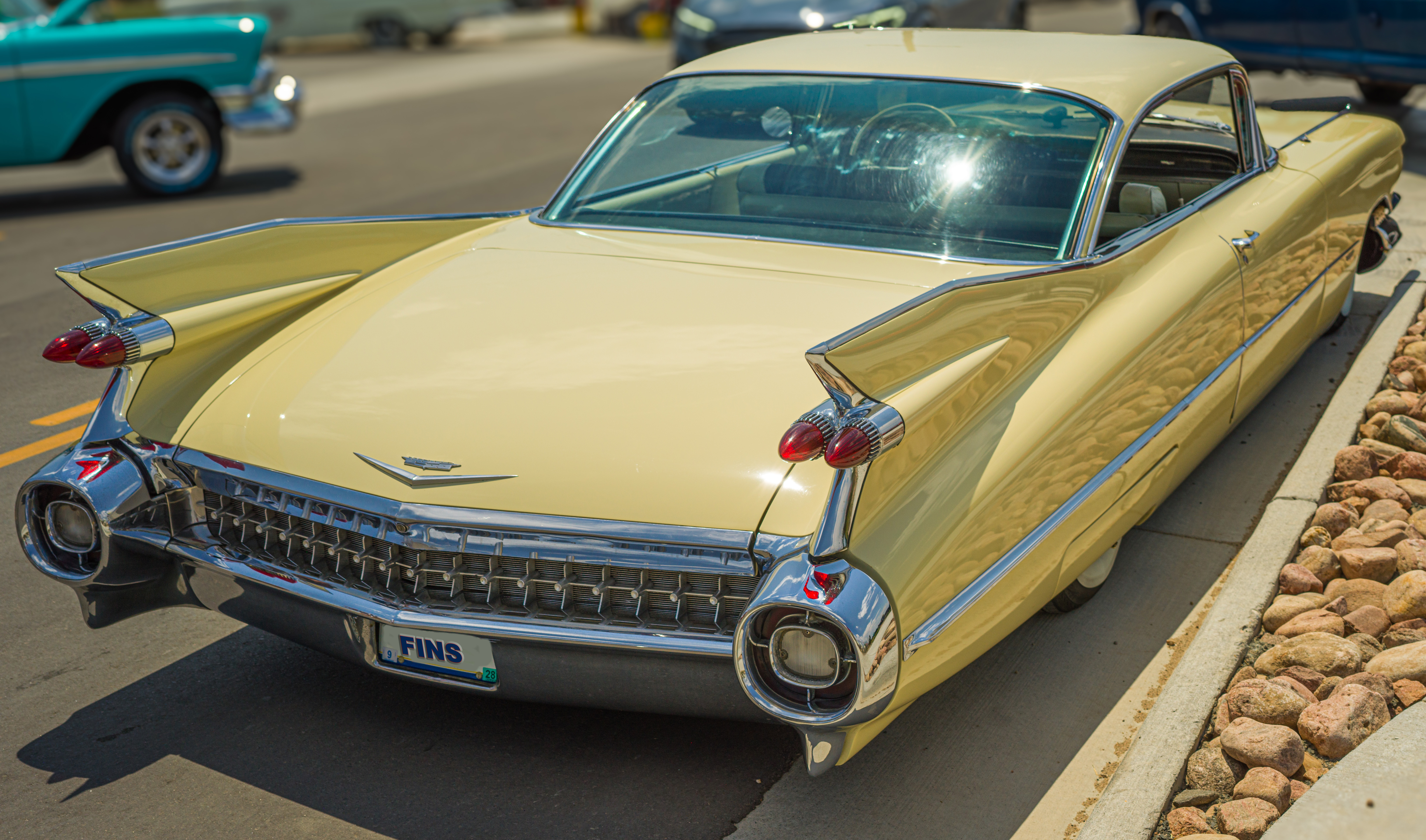
1959 Cadillac Series 62 Hardtop

The 1959 Cadillac is remembered for its iconic huge tailfins with dual bullet tail lights. The new model year also saw two distinctive rooflines and roof pillar configurations, new jewel-like grille patterns and matching deck lid beauty panels. For 1959, the Series 62 became the Series 6200. De Villes and 2-door Eldorados were moved from the Series 6200 to their own series, the Series 63 and Series 64 respectively, though they all, including the 4-door Eldorado Brougham (which was moved from the Series 70 to Series 69), shared the same 130 in (3,302 mm) wheelbase. Engine output was an even 325 hp (242 kW) from the 390 cu in (6.4 L) engine. The Series 62 was identifiable by its straight body rub moldings, running from front wheel opening to back bumpers, with crest medallions below the spear. A one-deck jeweled rear grille insert was seen. Standard equipment included power brakes, power steering, automatic transmission, back-up lamps, windshield wipers, two-speed wipers, wheel discs, outside rearview mirror, vanity mirror and oil filter. The convertible model had power windows and a two-way power seat. Plain fender skirts covered the rear wheels and 4-doors were available in either four-window or six-window hardtop configurations. With the De Villes and 2-door Eldorados in their own series sales plunged to only 70,736, the lowest since the 1950 model year.

The 1960 Series 62 had smoother, more restrained styling. General changes included a full-width grille, the elimination of pointed front bumper guards, increased restraint in the application of chrome trim, lower tailfins with oval shaped nacelles and front fender mounted directional indicator lamps. Series 62 models were distinguished by plain fender skirts, thin three-quarter length bodyside spears and Cadillac crests and lettering on short horizontal front fender bars mounted just behind the headlights. Four-window and six-window hardtop sedans were offered again. The former featured a one-piece wraparound backlight and flat-top roof, while the latter had a sloping rear window and roofline. Standard equipment included power brakes, power steering, automatic transmission, dual back-up lamps, windshield wipers, two-speed wipers, wheel discs, outside rearview mirror, vanity mirror and oil filter. The convertible model had power windows and a two-way power seat. Technical highlights were finned rear drums and an X-frame construction. Interiors were done in Fawn, Blue or Gray Cortina Cord or Turquoise, Green, Persian Sand, or Black Caspian cloth with Florentine vinyl bolsters. Convertibles were upholstered in Florentine leather single or two-tone combinations or monochromatic Cardiff leather combinations.

== Seventh generation (1961–1964) ==
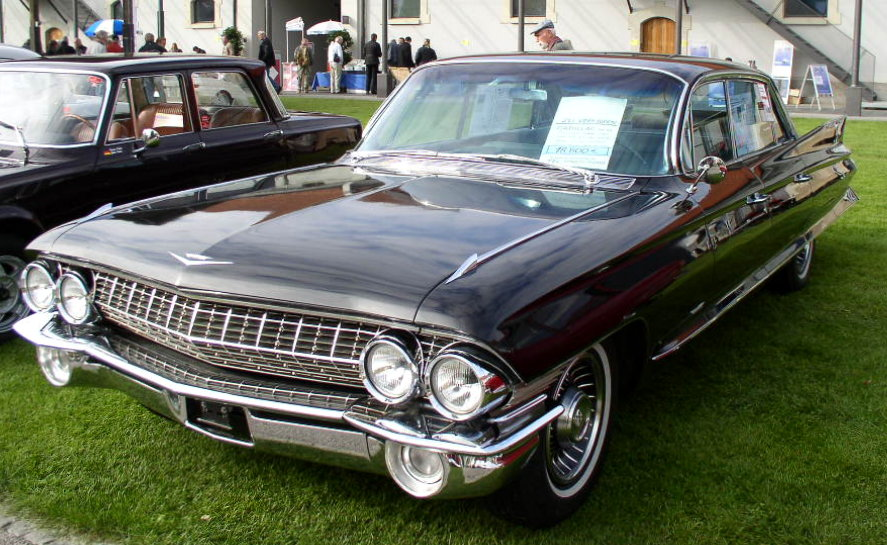
1961 Cadillac Series 62 6-window sedan

Seventh generation
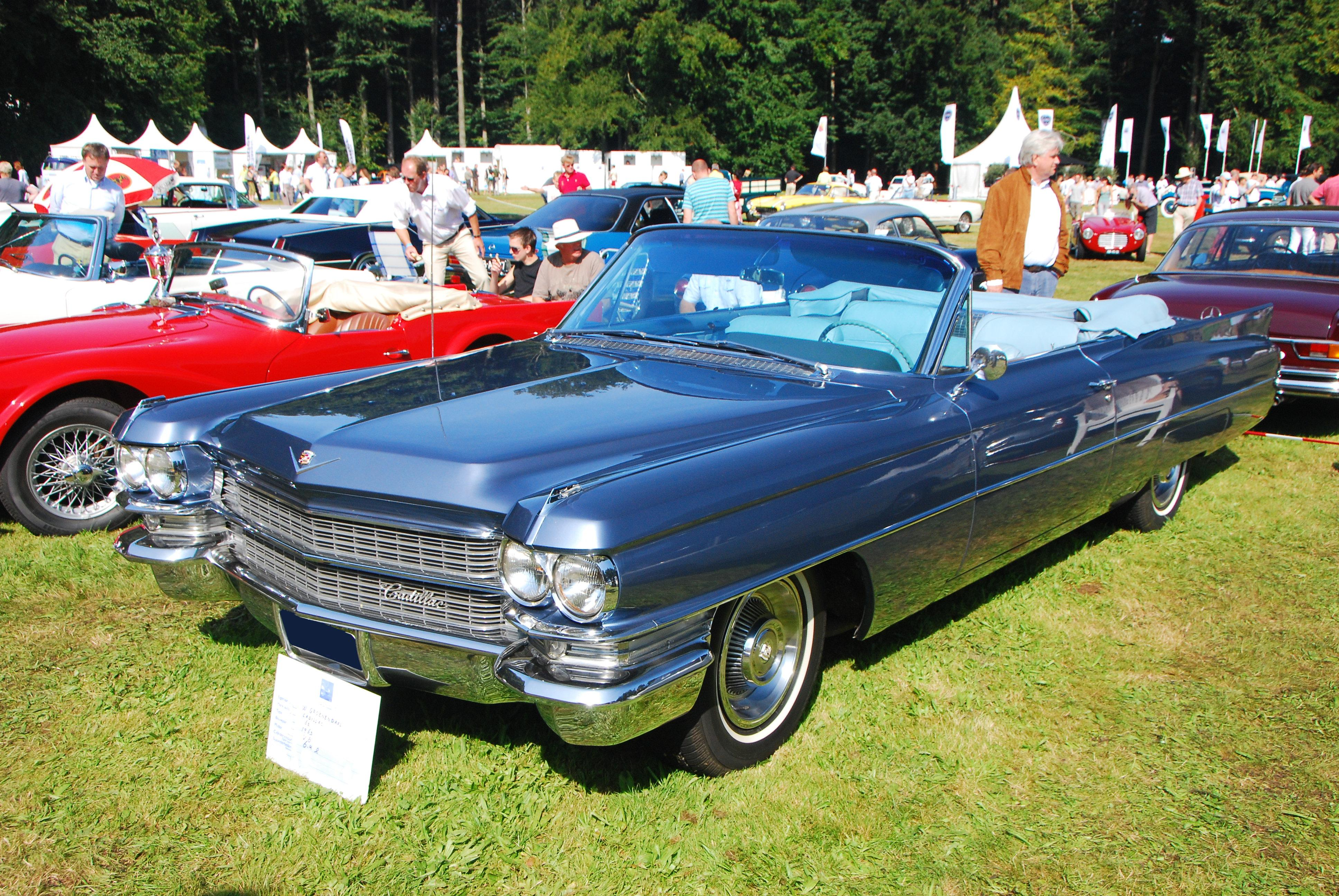

Overview
- Model years: 1961–1964
- Designer: Bill Mitchell

Body and chassis
- Body style: 2-door hardtop 4-door 6-window hardtop 4-door 4-window hardtop 4-door Town Sedan hardtop 2-door convertible
- Platform: C-body
- Related: Cadillac Eldorado; Cadillac Sixty Special; Cadillac De Ville; Buick Electra; Oldsmobile 98

Powertrain
- Engine: 390 cu in (6.4 L) OHV V8; 429 cu in (7.0 L) OHV V8
- Transmission: 4-speed Hydra-Matic automatic 3-speed TH-400, automatic

Dimensions
- Wheelbase: 1961–64: 129.5 in (3,289 mm)
- Length: 1961–62 (except Town Sedan): 222.0 in (5,639 mm); 1962 Town Sedan: 215.0 in (5,461 mm); 1963: 223.0 in (5,664 mm); 1964: 223.5 in (5,677 mm)
- Width: 1961: 79.8 in (2,027 mm); 1962: 79.9 in (2,029 mm); 1963: 79.7 in (2,024 mm); 1964: 79.5 in (2,019 mm)
- Height: 1961–62: 56.3 in (1,430 mm); 1963–64: 56.6 in (1,438 mm)
- Curb weight: 4,700–4,900 lb (2,100–2,200 kg)

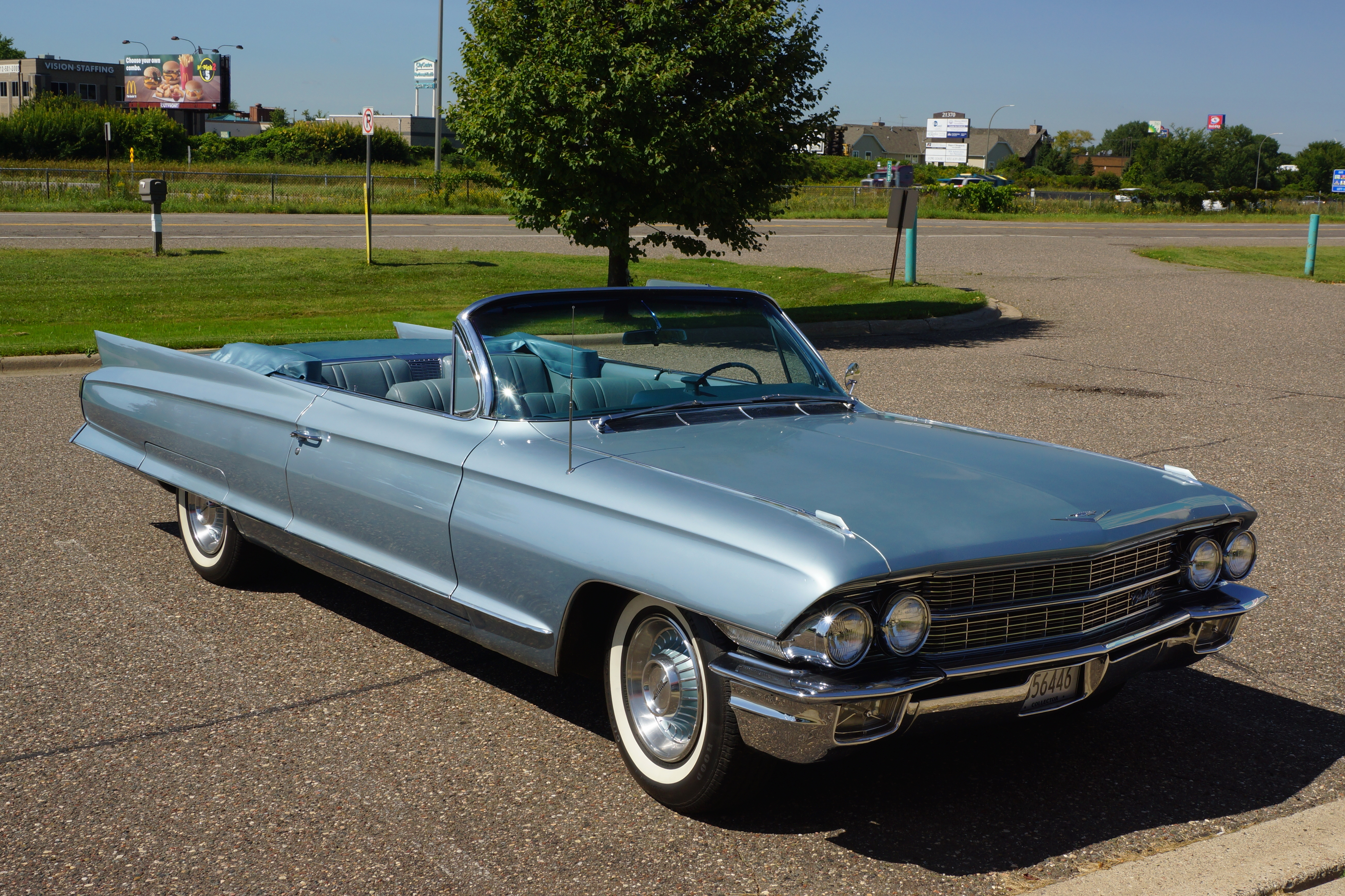
1962 Cadillac Series 62 Convertible

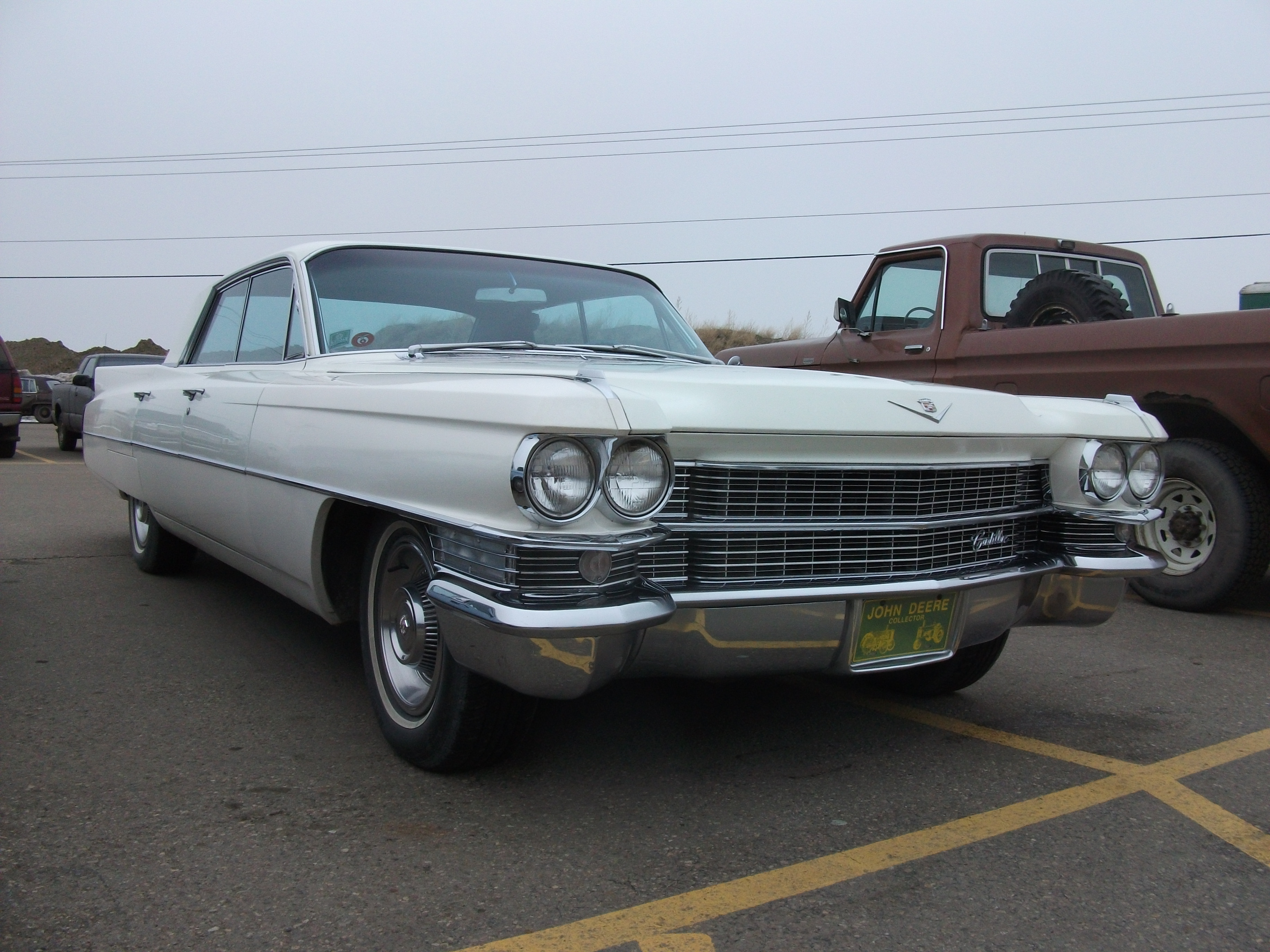
1963 Cadillac Series 62 4-window sedan

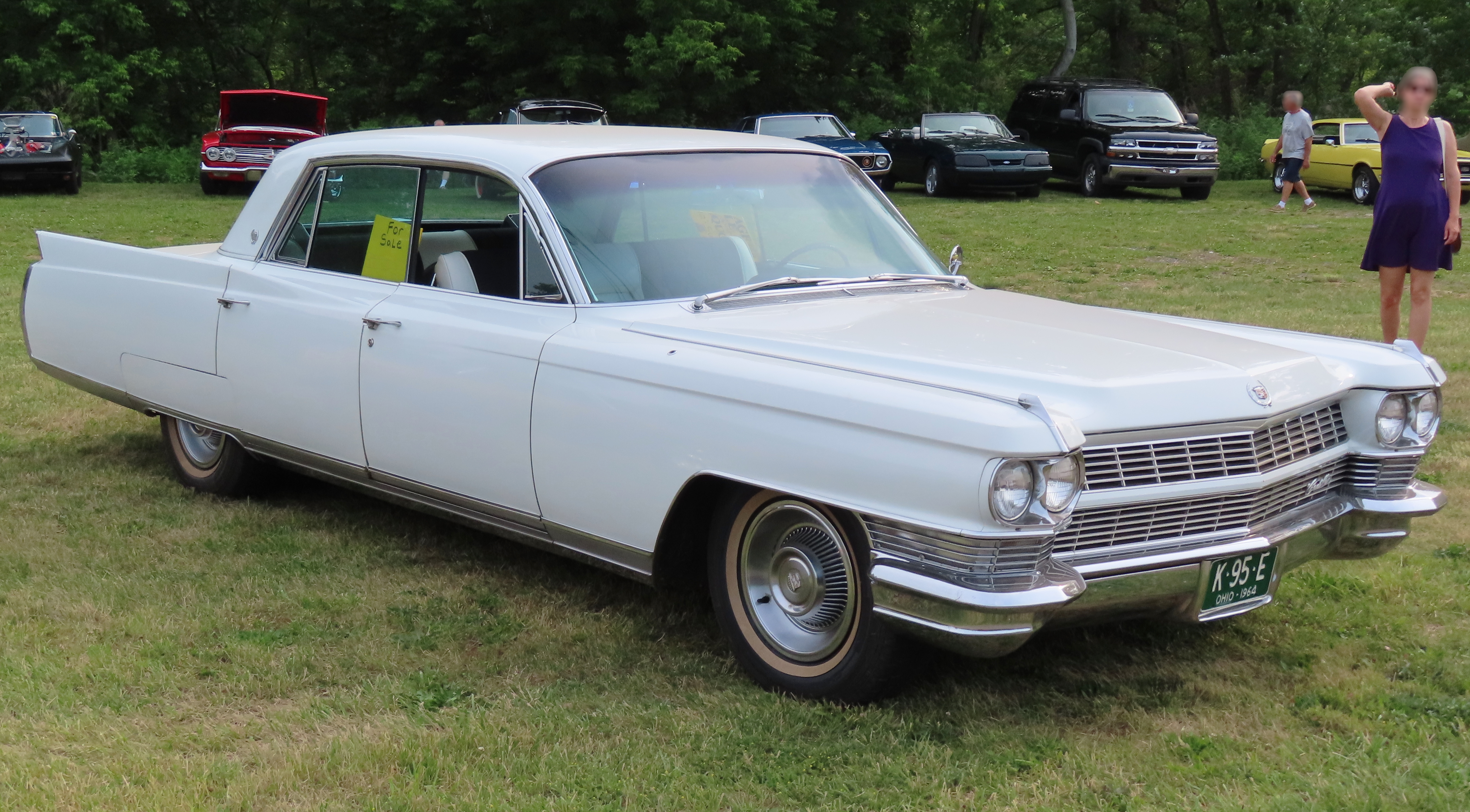
1964 Cadillac Series 62 6-window sedan

Cadillac was restyled and re-engineered for 1961. The new grille slanted back towards both the bumper and the hood lip, along the horizontal plan, and sat between dual headlamps. New forward slanting front pillars with non-wraparound windshield glass were seen. The revised backlight treatment had crisp angular lines with thin pillars on some models and heavier semi-blind quarter roof posts on others. Standard equipment power brakes, power steering, automatic transmission, dual reverse lights, windshield washer, dual speed wipers, wheel discs, plain fender skirts, outside rearview mirror, vanity mirror and oil filter. Rubberized front and rear coil springs replaced the trouble prone air suspension system. Four-barrel induction systems were now the sole power choice and dual exhaust were no longer available.

A mild face lift characterized Cadillac styling trends for 1962. A flatter grille with a thicker horizontal center bar and more delicate cross-hatched insert appeared. Ribbed chrome trim panel, seen ahead of the front wheel housings for 1961, were now replaced with standard cornering lamps and front fender model and series identification badges were eliminated. More massive front bumper end pieces appeared and housed rectangular parking lamps. At the rear tail lamps were now housed in vertical nacelles designed with an angled peak at the center. A vertically ribbed rear beauty panel appeared on the deck lid latch panel. Cadillac script also appeared on the lower left side of the radiator grille. The short-deck hardtop Town Sedan was moved from the Series 6300 to the Series 6200, being replaced by a short-deck Sedan de Ville Park Avenue in the Series 6300. In addition all short deck Cadillac models went from being 6-window sedans for 1961 to 4-window sedans for 1962 and 1963. The Town Sedan would disappear for 1963, with only 4,900 sold (of 134,572 Series 62s in all), though the Sedan de Ville Park Avenue sold even fewer, 4,175 (out of 150,882 De Villes). Standard equipment included all of last year's equipment plus remote controlled outside rearview mirror, five tubeless black wall tires, heater and defroster and front cornering lamps. Cadillac refined the ride and quietness, with more insulation in the floor and behind the firewall.

1963 brought another restyle. Exterior changes imparted a bolder and longer look. Hoods and deck lids were redesigned. The front fenders projected 4.625" further forward than for 1962 while the tailfins were trimmed down somewhat to provide a lower profile. Body side sculpturing was eliminated. The slightly V-shaped radiator grille was taller and now incorporated outer extensions that swept below the flush-fender dual headlamps. Smaller circular front parking lamps were mounted in those extensions. A total of 143 options including bucket seats with wool, leather or nylon upholstery fabrics and wood veneer facings on dash, doors and seatbacks, set an all-time record for interior appointment choices. Standard equipment was the same as the previous year. Convertibles were equipped with additional features. The engine displacement and output remained the same, 390 cu in (6.4 L) and 325 hp (242 kW).

A minor facelift for 1964 featured a new bi-angular grille that formed a V-shape along both its vertical and horizontal planes. The main horizontal grille bar was now carried around the body sides. Outer grille extension panels again housed the parking and cornering lamps. It was the 17th consecutive year for the Cadillac tailfins with a new fine-blade design carrying on the tradition. Performance improvements including a larger V-8 were the dominant changes for the model run. Equipment features were same as in 1963 for the most part. Comfort Control, a completely automatic heating and air conditioning system controlled by a dial thermostat on the instrument panel, was introduced as an industry first. The engine was bumped to 429 cu in (7 L), with 340 hp (253.5 kW) available. In its final year only 35,079 Series 62s were sold, the smallest number since 1946 and little more than a quarter of their all-time sales record in 1956. The 62 convertible was dropped for 1964.

The Series 62 (née 6200) designation was dropped after 1964. Cadillac's entry-level car was renamed Calais for 1965–1976.
