= V63 =

V63 may refer to:

- Cadillac Type V-63, an American automobile
- MÁV Class V63, a Hungarian locomotive
- Vanadium-63, an isotope of vanadium
