= Detroit Assembly =

Former automobile factory in Detroit

Coordinates: 42.331807°N 83.1012442°W

Detroit Assembly (also known as Detroit Cadillac, Cadillac Assembly, Cadillac Main, or Clark Street Assembly) was a General Motors automobile factory in Detroit, Michigan on Clark Street, south of Michigan Avenue (U.S. Route 12). It began operations in 1921 and Cadillac bodies were supplied by Fleetwood Metal Body in 1921 after Fisher Body assumed operations. It was the second location that built Cadillacs, when Cadillac originally started out as the Henry Ford Company which was located at the intersection of Cass Avenue and Amsterdam Street. Engine block and cylinder heads were cast at Saginaw Metal Casting Operations then assembled at Tonawanda Engine before delivery to Detroit Assembly for installation.

In 1903, the Cadillac Motor Company began operations at a factory built at 450 Amsterdam Street (now an apartment complex, although the original factory window style is still visible to this day), Detroit, and began building cars at the all new Clark Street facility in 1921, where the factory manufactured Cadillac models until December 23, 1987, when production of Cadillac's full-size D-bodies moved to Arlington Assembly in Arlington, Texas, while production of downsized FWD DeVille/Fleetwood/Seville models were relocated to Detroit/Hamtramck Assembly and Orion Assembly by 1985. It is approximately 2 miles southeast of the original Lincoln factory located at 6200 West Warren Avenue.

All Cadillac vehicles were built only at this home factory, with production of popular selling models later added to Linden, New Jersey, South Gate, California or Arlington, Texas in "knock down kits" starting in the 1930s to meet demand. The bodies were built by Fisher at Fleetwood Plant #18 at 261 W End St, and transferred by rail to Clark Street for final assembly.

From 1984 to 1987, the plant also built the Oldsmobile 88 and Custom Cruiser and the Chevrolet Caprice.

Detroit Assembly used the VIN codes "Q" and "9."

The site of the plant was redeveloped into the 88-acre Clark Street Technology Park in 1997 by General Motors and three other partners. It is now the location for Inland Waters Pollution Control.

== LaSalle Factory/DeSoto Factory ==
For a brief time Cadillac's LaSalle was built at a separate factory in Detroit called Wyoming Assembly at 6000 Wyoming Avenue just north of Ford Road east of the Ford Drive-In Theatre. It was built in 1917 to manufacture Liberty Engines for airplanes used during WW I, then the factory was used by Chalmers Automobile to build the Saxon automobile until 1922. General Motors bought the Chalmers Plant in 1926 and 1927 built LaSalle cars there. The factory is adjacent to the Dearborn neighborhood and is 2.75 miles west of the Clark Street Factory location. After LaSalle was no longer manufactured, it was purchased by Chrysler in 1934 and became a DeSoto factory until that brand was cancelled in the early 1960s. The factory is nearby railroad tracks which were very busy supplying coachwork from the Fleetwood Factory or other Fisher factories within Detroit and shipping finished product to cities across the United States.

=== Vehicles Manufactured ===
==== Historical and classic, 1902-1949 ====
===== Early Antique =====
- 1902-1903 Cadillac Runabout and Tonneau — 72 in wheelbase single-cylinder engine
- 1903-1904 Cadillac Model A — 72 in wheelbase single-cylinder engine
- 1904 Cadillac Models A and B
  - Model A — 72 in wheelbase single-cylinder engine
  - Model B — 76 in wheelbase single-cylinder engine
- 1905 Cadillac Models B, C, D, E and F
  - Model B — 76 in wheelbase single-cylinder engine
  - Model C — 72 in wheelbase single-cylinder engine
  - Model D — 100 in wheelbase four-cylinder engine
  - Model E — 74 in wheelbase single-cylinder engine
  - Model F — 76 in wheelbase single-cylinder engine
- 1906 Cadillac Models H, K, L, and M
  - Model H — 102 in wheelbase four-cylinder engine
  - Model K — 74 in wheelbase single-cylinder engine
  - Model L — 110 in wheelbase four-cylinder engine
  - Model M — 76 in wheelbase single-cylinder engine
- 1907 Cadillac Models G, H, K, and M
  - Model G — 100 in wheelbase four-cylinder engine
  - Model H — 102 in wheelbase four-cylinder engine
  - Model K — 74 in wheelbase single-cylinder engine
  - Model M — 76 in wheelbase single-cylinder engine
- 1908 Cadillac Models G, H, M, S and T
  - Model G — 100 in wheelbase four-cylinder engine
  - Model H — 102 in wheelbase four-cylinder engine
  - Model M — 76 in wheelbase single-cylinder engine
  - Model S — 82 in wheelbase single-cylinder engine
  - Model T — 82 in wheelbase single-cylinder engine
- 1909-1911 Cadillac Model Thirty
  - 1909 — 106 in wheelbase four-cylinder engine
  - 1910 — 110 in wheelbase; 120 in wheelbase (limousine) four-cylinder engine Fisher
  - 1911 — 116 in wheelbase four-cylinder engine Fisher
- 1912 — Cadillac Model 1912; 116 in wheelbase four-cylinder engine Fisher
- 1913 — Cadillac Model 1913; 120 in wheelbase four-cylinder engine Fisher
- 1914 — Cadillac Model 1914; 120 and 134 in wheelbase four-cylinder engine Fisher
- 1915 — Cadillac Type 51; 122 and 145 in wheelbase V8 Fisher
- 1916 — Cadillac Type 53; 122 132 and 145 in wheelbase V8 Fisher
- 1917 — Cadillac Type 55; 125 and 145 in wheelbase V8 Fisher
- 1918-1919 Cadillac Type 57; 125 132 and 145 in wheelbase V8 Fisher

===== 1920s =====
- 1920-1921 Cadillac Type 59; 122 and 132 in wheelbase V8 Fisher
- 1922-1923 Cadillac Type 61; 132 in wheelbase V8 Fisher

All vehicles listed below were manufactured at Clark Street Assembly

- 1924 — Cadillac Type V-63; 132 and 145 in wheelbase V8 Fisher
- 1925 — Cadillac Type V-63; 132 138 and 145 in wheelbase V8 Fisher Fleetwood
- 1926-1927 Cadillac Series 314; 132 138 and 150 in wheelbase V8 Fisher Fleetwood
- 1928 — Cadillac Series 341-A; 140 and 152 in wheelbase V8 Fisher Fleetwood
- 1929 — Cadillac Series 341-B; 140 and 152 in wheelbase V8 Fisher Fleetwood

===== 1930s =====
- 1930 Cadillac Series 353, 370 and 452 Fisher Fleetwood
  - Series 353 — 140 and 152 in wheelbase V8 Fisher Fleetwood
  - Series 370 — 140 143 and 152 in wheelbase V12 Fisher Fleetwood
  - Series 452 — 148 in wheelbase V16 Fisher Fleetwood
- 1931 Cadillac Series 355, 370-A and 452-A Fisher Fleetwood
  - Series 355 — 134 and 152 in wheelbase V8 Fleetwood
  - Series 370-A — 140 143 and 152 in wheelbase V12 Fleetwood
  - Series 452-A — 148 in wheelbase V16 Fisher Fleetwood
- 1932 Cadillac Series 355-B, 370-B and 452-B Fisher Fleetwood
  - Series 355-B — 134 and 156 in wheelbase V8 Fisher Fleetwood
  - Series 370-B — 140 and 156 in wheelbase V12 Fisher Fleetwood
  - Series 452-B — 143 and 149 in wheelbase V16 Fisher Fleetwood
- 1933 Cadillac Series 355-C, 370-C and 452-C Fisher Fleetwood
  - Series 355-C — 140 and 156 in wheelbase V8
  - Series 370-C — 134 140 and 156 in wheelbase V12
  - Series 452-C — 143 and 149 in wheelbase V16
- 1934 Cadillac Series 10, 20, 30 and 452-D Fisher Fleetwood
  - Series 10 — 128 in wheelbase V8
  - Series 20 — 136 in wheelbase V8
  - Series 30 — 146 in wheelbase V8
  - Series 355-D
  - Series 370-D — 146 in wheelbase V12
  - Series 452-D — 154 in wheelbase V16
- 1935 Cadillac Series 10, 20, 30 and 452-D Fisher Fleetwood
  - Series 10 — 128 in wheelbase V8
  - Series 20 — 136 in wheelbase V8
  - Series 30 — 146 in wheelbase V8
  - Series 370-D — 146 and 160 in wheelbase V12
  - Series 452-D or 60 — 154 in wheelbase V16
- 1936 Cadillac Series 36–60, 36–70, 36–75, 36–80, 36–85, 36-90 Fisher Fleetwood
  - Series 36-60 — 121 in wheelbase V8
  - Series 36-70 — 131 in wheelbase V8
  - Series 36-75 — 138 in wheelbase V8
  - Series 36-80 — 131 and 160 in wheelbase V12
  - Series 36-85 — 138 in wheelbase V12
  - Series 36-90 — 154 in wheelbase V16
- 1937 Cadillac Series 36–60, 37–65, 37–70, 37–75, 37–85, 37-90 Fisher Fleetwood
  - Series 37-60 — 124 and 160.75 in wheelbase V8
  - Series 37-65 — 131 in wheelbase V8
  - Series 37-70 — 131 in wheelbase V8
  - Series 37-75 — 138 and 156 in wheelbase V8
  - Series 37-85 — 138 in wheelbase V12
  - Series 37-90 — 154 in wheelbase V16
- 1938 Cadillac Series 38–60, 38-60S, 38–65, 38–75, 38-90 Fisher Fleetwood
  - Series 38-60 — 124 and 160 in wheelbase V8
  - Series 38-60S — 127 in wheelbase V8
  - Series 38-65 — 132 in wheelbase V8
  - Series 38-75 — 141 and 160 in wheelbase V8
  - Series 38-90 — 141 in wheelbase V16
- 1939 Cadillac Series 39-60S, 39–65, 39–75, 39-90 Fisher Fleetwood
  - Series 39-60S — 127 in wheelbase V8
  - Series 39-61 — 126 and 162_ in wheelbase V8
  - Series 39-75 — 141 and 161_ in wheelbase V8
  - Series 39-90 — 141 in wheelbase V16

===== 1940s =====
- 1940 Cadillac Series 40-60S, 40–62, 40–72, 40–75, 40-90 Fisher Fleetwood
  - Series 40-60S — 127 in wheelbase V8
  - Series 40-62 — 129 in wheelbase V8
  - Series 40-72 — 138 and 165_ in wheelbase V8
  - Series 40-75 — 141 and 161_ in wheelbase V8
  - Series 40-90 — 141 in wheelbase V16
- 1941 Cadillac Series 41-60S, 41–61, 41–62, 41–63, 41–67, 41-75 Fisher Fleetwood
  - Series 41-60S — 126 in wheelbase V8
  - Series 41-61 — 126 in wheelbase V8
  - Series 41-62 — 126 and 163 in wheelbase V8
  - Series 41-63 — 126 in wheelbase V8
  - Series 41-67 — 139 in wheelbase V8
  - Series 41-75 — 136 and 163 in wheelbase V8
- 1942 Cadillac Series 42-60S, 42–61, 42–62, 42–63, 42–67, 42-75 Fisher Fleetwood
  - Series 42-60S Fleetwood — 133 in wheelbase V8
  - Series 42-61 — 126 in wheelbase V8
  - Series 42-62 — 129 in wheelbase V8
  - Series 42-63 — 126 in wheelbase V8
  - Series 42-67 — 139 in wheelbase V8
  - Series 42-75 — 136 and 163 in wheelbase V8
- 1946 Cadillac Series 60S, 61, 62, 75 Fisher Fleetwood
  - Series 60S Fleetwood — 133 in wheelbase V8
  - Series 61 — 126 in wheelbase V8
  - Series 62 — 129 in wheelbase V8
  - Series 75 — 136 in wheelbase V8
- 1947 Cadillac Series 60S, 61, 62, 75 Fisher Fleetwood
  - Series 60S Fleetwood — 133 in wheelbase V8
  - Series 61 — 126 in wheelbase V8
  - Series 62 — 129 in wheelbase V8
  - Series 75 — 138 in wheelbase V8
- 1948-1949 Cadillac Series 60S, 61, 62, 75 Fisher Fleetwood
  - Series 60S Fleetwood — 133 in wheelbase V8
  - Series 61 — 126 in wheelbase V8
  - Series 62 — 126 in wheelbase V8
  - Series 75 — 136 in wheelbase V8

==== Modern Era ====
- Cadillac Seville
- Cadillac Calais
- Cadillac DeVille
- Cadillac Eldorado
- Cadillac Fleetwood
- Cadillac Fleetwood Brougham

== See also ==
- List of GM factories
- List of Chrysler factories
- List of former automotive manufacturing plants
