= Cadillac Runabout and Tonneau =

Automobiles built in 1902

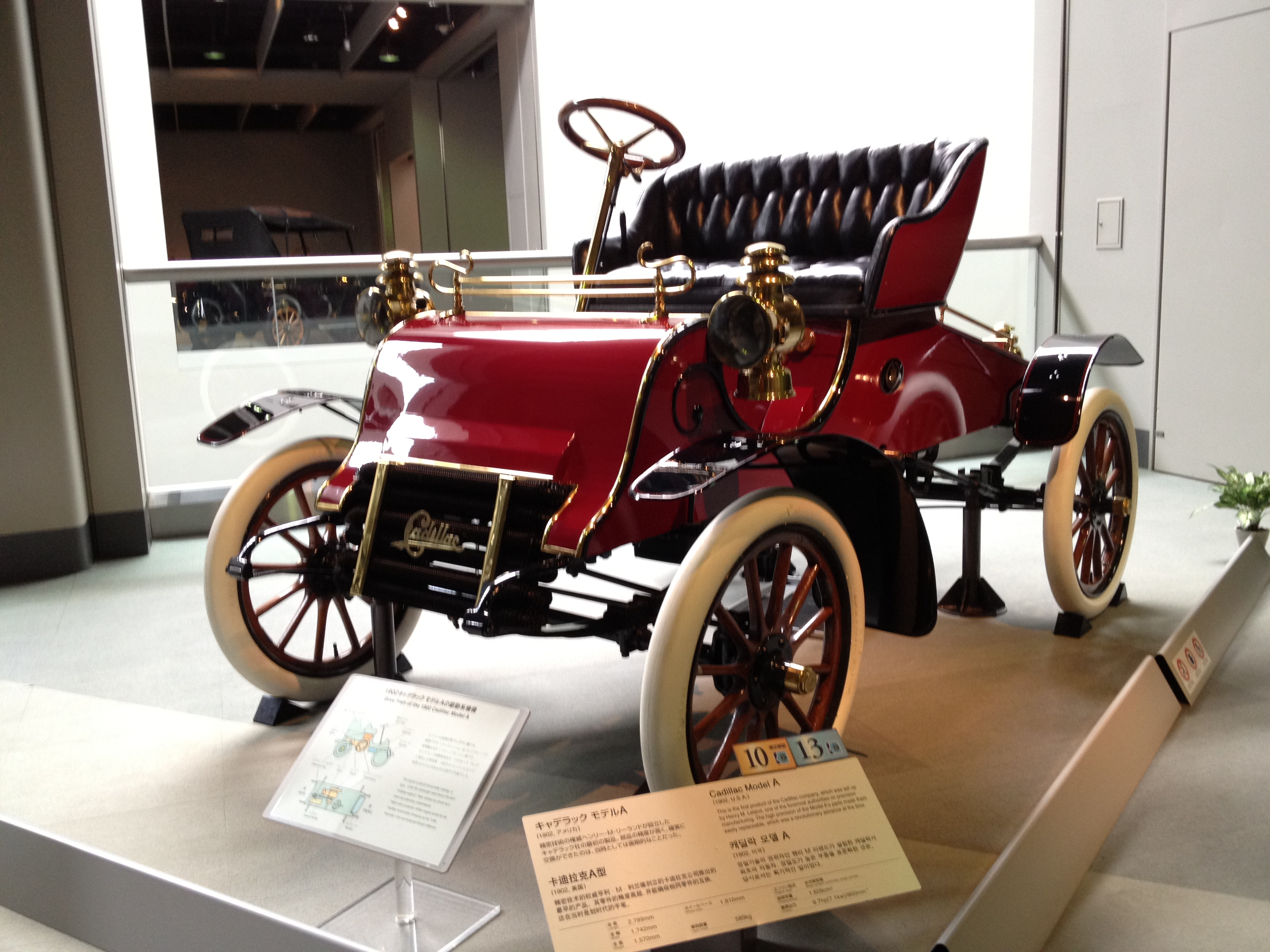
The Cadillac 1903 Model Runabout introduced in 1902

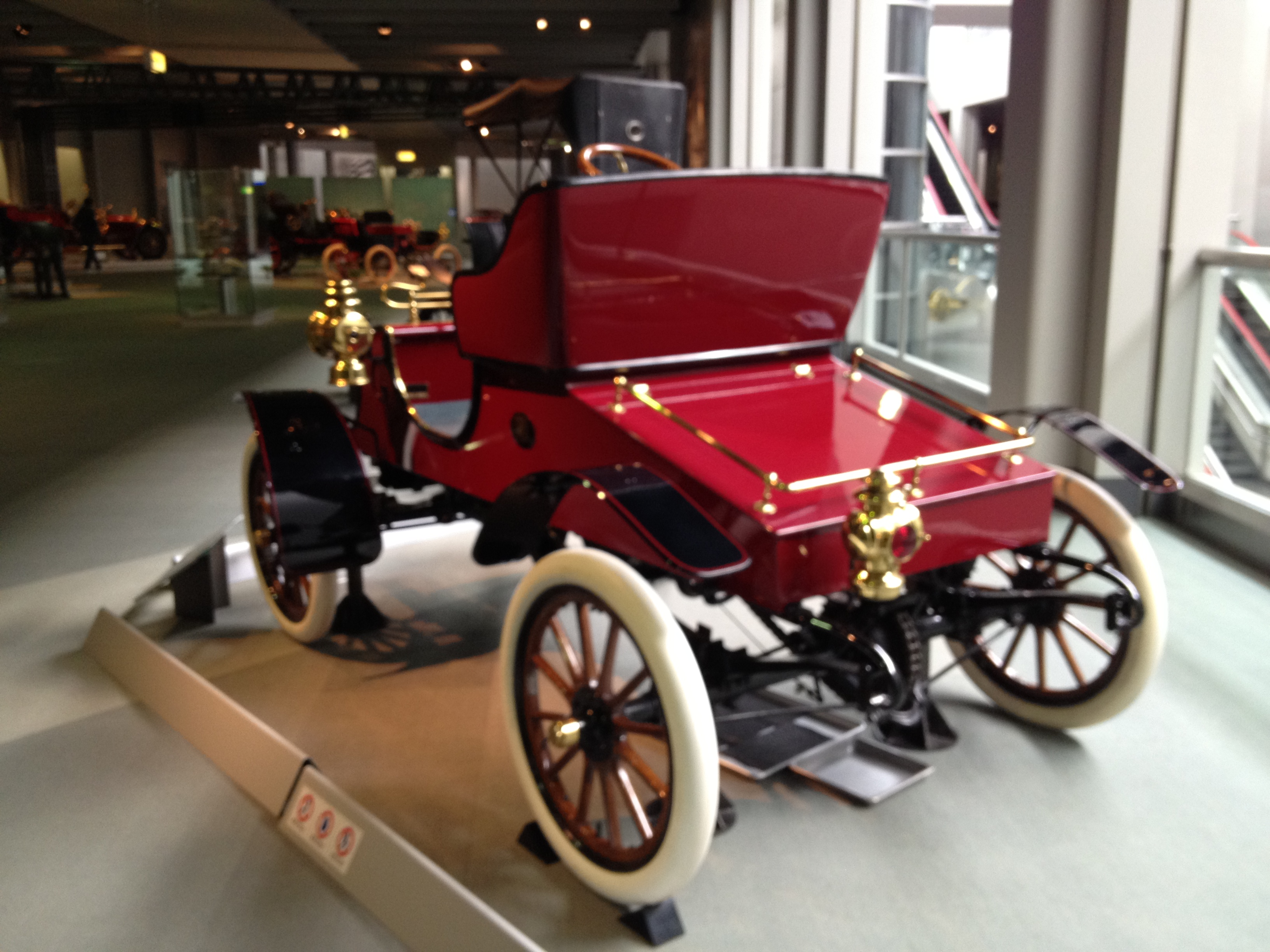

The first Cadillac automobiles were the 1903 Model built in the last quarter of 1902. These were 2-seater "horseless carriages" powered by a reliable and sturdy 10 hp (7 kW) single-cylinder engine developed by Alanson Partridge Brush and built by Leland and Faulconer Manufacturing Company of Detroit, of which Henry Leland was founder, vice-president and general manager.

Reformed as the Cadillac Automobile Company in August 1902, it began manufacturing the runabouts and named them "Cadillac" after the city's founder Antoine Laumet, the self-styled Antoine Laumet de La Mothe, sieur de Cadillac at the re-purposed Detroit Assembly. The 1904 Model B was a refinement of the 1903 and while still a mid-engined, one cylinder automobile, it now had an extended front and transverse front suspension. With the introduction of the Model B, the 1903 style became known as the Model A . Both the Model A and B were available as a two-passenger runabout or four passenger rear tonneau. Catalogs also show a light delivery.

The one cylinder Cadillac continued to be offered through 1908 in the runabout, tonneau or delivery bodies under a variety of Model designations which are delineated below.

== Single-cylinder engine ==
The Models A, B, C, E, and F shared a single-cylinder 98.2 cu in (1,609 cc) engine rated from 6.5 to around 9 hp (7 kW) depending on model. The cylinder was horizontal, pointing rearward, and was cast from iron with a copper water jacket. Bore and stroke were square at 5 in (130 mm). The engine was named by its manufacturers, Leland and Faulconer, "Little Hercules".

The engine employed a patented variable-lift intake valve licensed from Alanson Partridge Brush. The restrictions of this design using Brush's patents led the company to develop their own four-cylinder engine for the later Models D, L, G, and H.

== Rear entrance tonneau ==
When the street was muddy or dirty the car would be backed up to the sidewalk so tonneau passengers did not need to walk in the mud.

== Model A ==
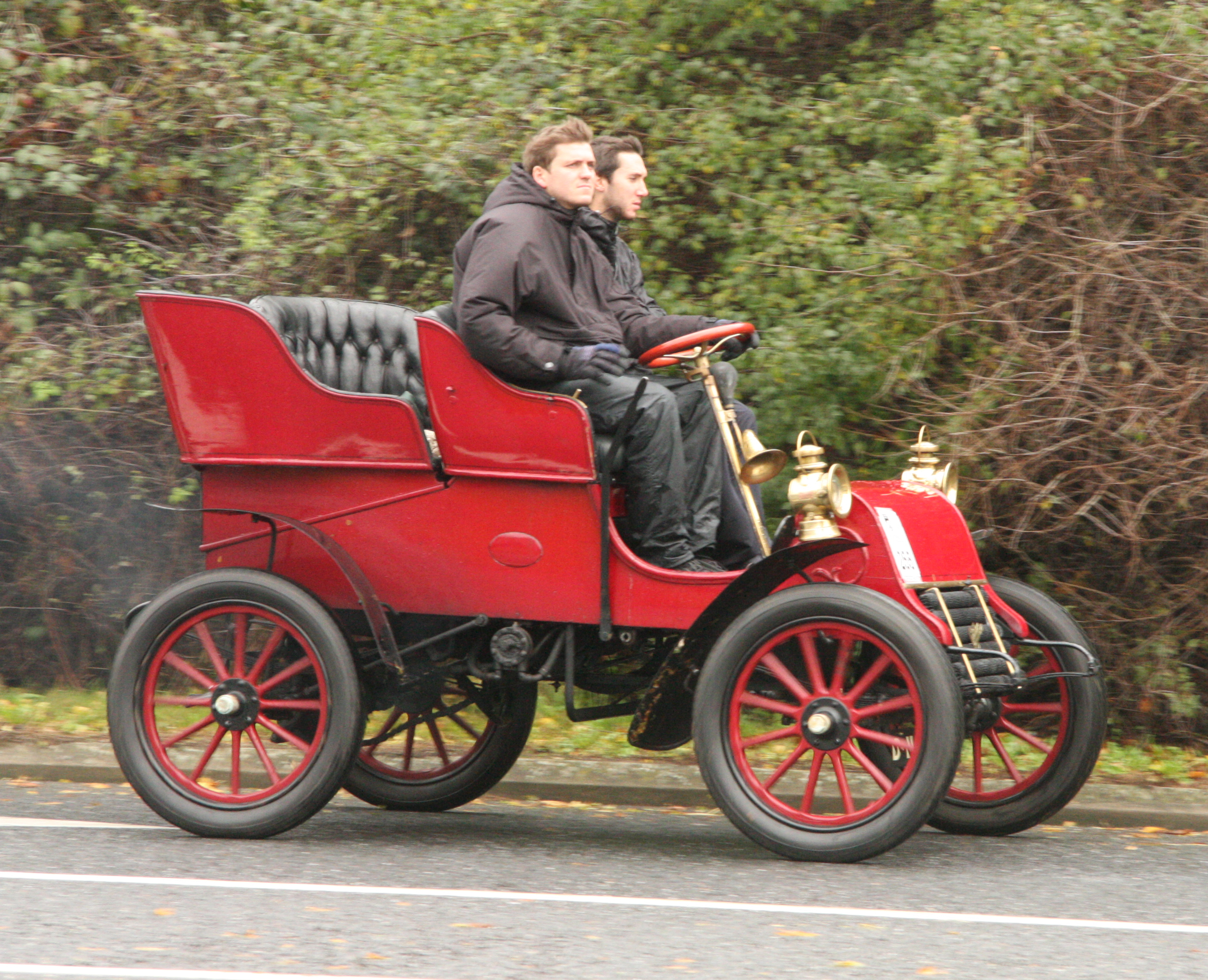
Tonneau 1903 rear-entrance

Three cars were completed in time for the New York Auto Show staged in January, 1903. All three cars were sold at the show and by mid-week orders had been taken for 2,286 further units, each one requiring a deposit of US$10 ($358 in 2025 dollars). The cars had some similarities to the Ford Model A; however, the Cadillac was designed by Alanson Partridge Brush.

Throughout 1903, 2,497 units were built. Production began in March 1903 and output totalled 1,895 units from March 1903 to March 1904. The 2-seater runabout cost US$750 ($26,875 in 2025 dollars); an optional rear entrance detachable tonneau cost $100 and doubled the occupant capacity. The entire body was bolted to the chassis and could be lifted without removing or disconnecting any plumbing or wiring.

Cadillacs of 1903 sometimes are identified erroneously as the Model A; in fact, they were known simply as the "Cadillac Runabout" and the "Cadillac Tonneau". When a new Cadillac was introduced in 1904, it was designated the "Model B"; meanwhile, production of the earlier runabout and tonneau models continued through a second year. Only at that time did Cadillac began to designate them as Model A cars to distinguish them from the new, 1904 models.

The front of the car had a sloping, curved, false hood and radiator. The car was advertised as having 6 1/2 horsepower (4.8 kW). Power was transmitted the rear wheels by chain-drive through a planetary transmission. Pedal operated brakes on rear axles were supplemented by engaging reverse gear. The 22-inch wood wheels had 12 spokes and the car's wheelbase was 72 in (1,800 mm).

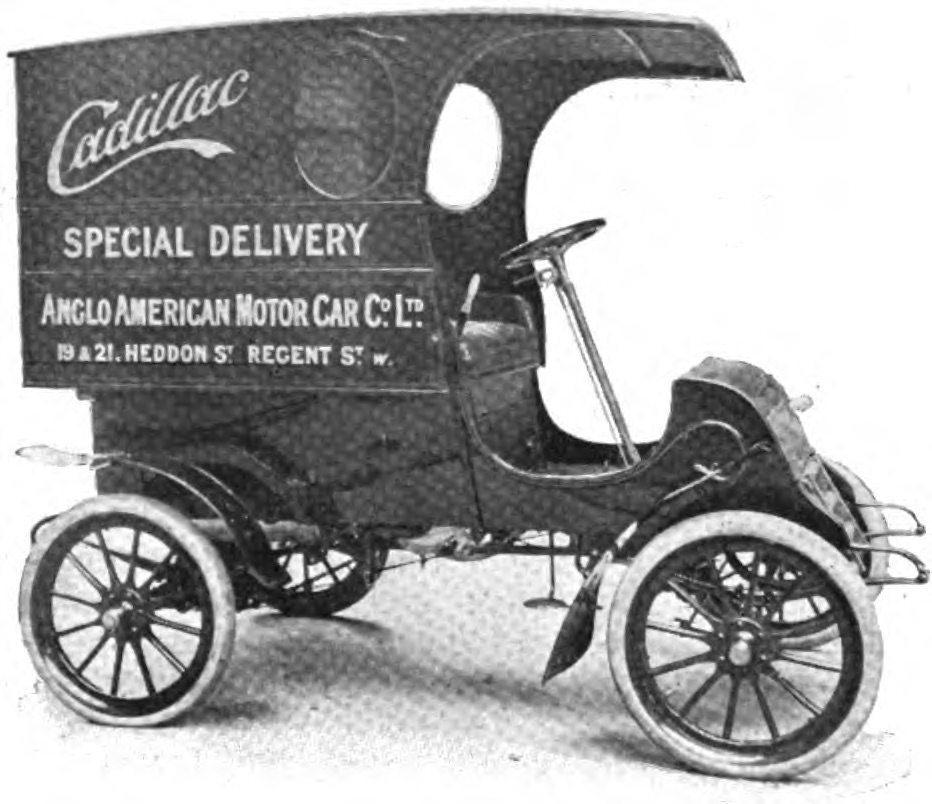
Delivery

Options

- Bolt-on rear-entrance tonneau containing two more seats $100 ($3,583 in 2025 dollars)
- Leather top, side curtains etc. $50 ($1,792 in 2025 dollars)
- Rubber top, side curtains etc. $300 ($10,750 in 2025 dollars)
- Head and side-lamps
- Alternative chain sprockets to adjust road speed

=== Reputation ===
The Cadillac earned a reputation for reliability, ease and economy of maintenance and for being a car with a remarkable ability for climbing and pulling. In 1903, F. S. Bennett, Cadillac's importer into the UK, entered the car in the Sunrising Hill Climb, where it was the only single-cylinder car to finish, and in the 1,000 Miles Reliability Trial, where it came fourth in its price class in overall points but first in its class in points scored for reliability.

Production continued into 1904 but with an 8 1/4 horsepower (6.2 kW) engine. A pressure-fed multiple oiler was added.

== Model B (1904) ==
Model F 1905 custom bodied open-drive limousine with running boards and full fenders

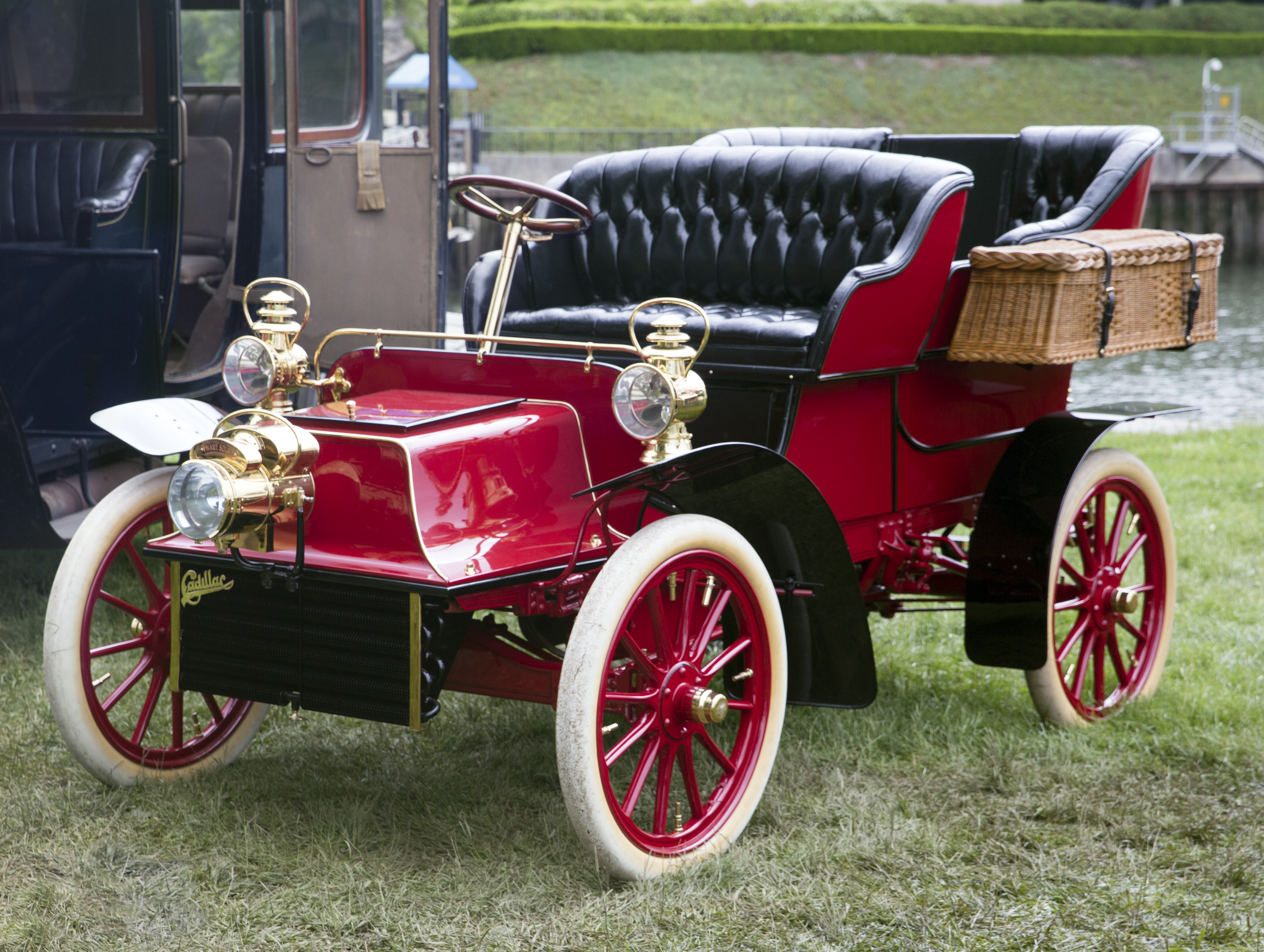
Model B 1904 Tonneau rear-entrance (C front)

Introduced in January 1904 Cadillac's Model B was similar to their Model A, sharing its engine but using a pressed-steel frame and axles and the Model B was on a longer 76 in (1,930 mm) wheelbase. The front axle is described as girder-style. It supported the car through a single transverse half-elliptic spring. The sloping dash was replaced by a detachable box-like front to the body and a vertical radiator. All body styles lost as much as 70 pounds weight. Prices went up $50. The car was advertised as having 8 1/4 horsepower (6.2 kW) but there were no changes to the design of the engine.

The Model B was available as a runabout or a touring car with a detachable rear-entrance tonneau and optional surrey top, or with a delivery body. The passenger cars were both priced at $900 and weighed roughly 1,450 lb (658 kg). Options now included a bulb horn and a deck to replace the tonneau. The Model B continued in production through 1905 when an alternative tubular front axle was available and the power was advertised as 9 hp (6.7 kW).

== Model C (1905) ==
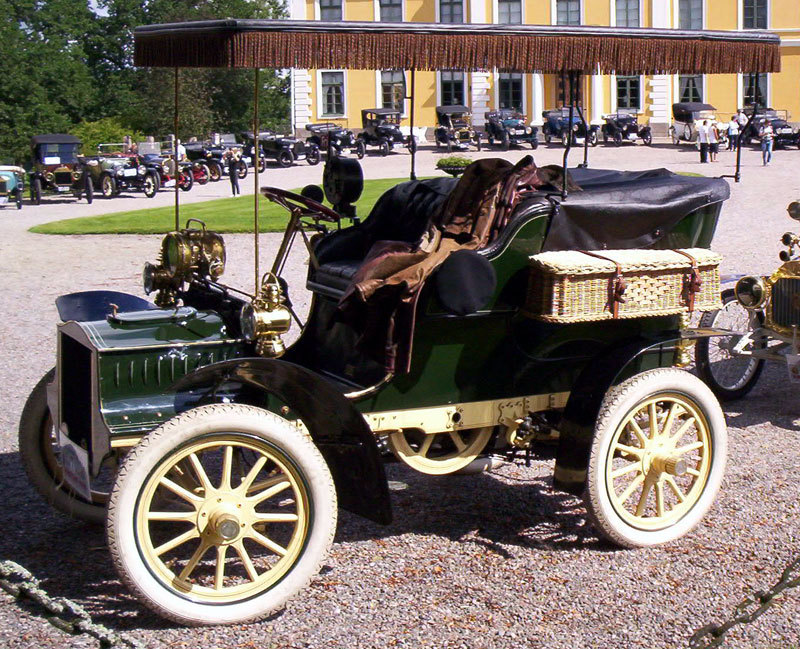
Model C touring car 1905 rear-entrance tonneau, surrey top

The Model C was a short-wheelbase car intended to replace the old Models A and B for the summer of 1905. It shared much of the Model B chassis components, but used the hood and radiator of the Model F. The tonneau was detachable, unlike the Model F.

Riding on a 72 in (1,800 mm) wheelbase, Model C was available as either a runabout, priced at $750, or touring car, priced at $850, with a detachable rear-entrance tonneau and optional surrey top. The lightweight runabout weighed just 1,330 lb (600 kg), 120 pounds (54 kg) less than the touring model.

== Model D (1905) ==
Four cylinder engine, see separate article Cadillac Model D

== Model E (1905) ==
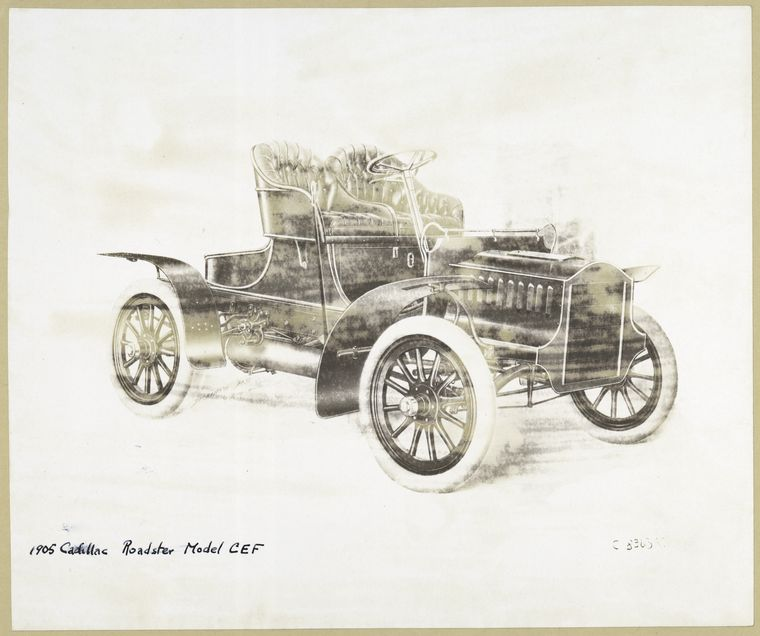
Model E Runabout 1905

The Model E was released in January, 1905. It was a featherweight 1,100 lb (500 kg) runabout model with seating for two, priced at $750 in 1905. It used a 74 in (1,900 mm) wheelbase, splitting the difference between the C and the B/F.

No detachable tonneau to make it a four-seater was available. The arched front axle was tubular. The axle was given a truss and added mid-year was a rocker shaft between it and the spring. Single cylinder 98.2 cu in (1,609 cc) engine with an advertised output of 9 horsepower. The planetary transmission which had balanced linkage on its bands provided two speeds and reverse. Drive was taken to the back axle by chain.

One of the first closed-body coupes was first built using a Model E, called the Cadillac Osceola, at the C. R. Wilson Company. The Osceola was requested by Mr. Leland to determine the feasibility of a car body that was closed to the elements, and the construction was supervised by Fred J. Fischer, who, with Charles T. Fisher and his other brothers, later founded Fisher Body. Named for a Seminole Indian Chief whom Henry Leland admired, the Osceola remained with the Leland family for years.

== Model F (1905) ==
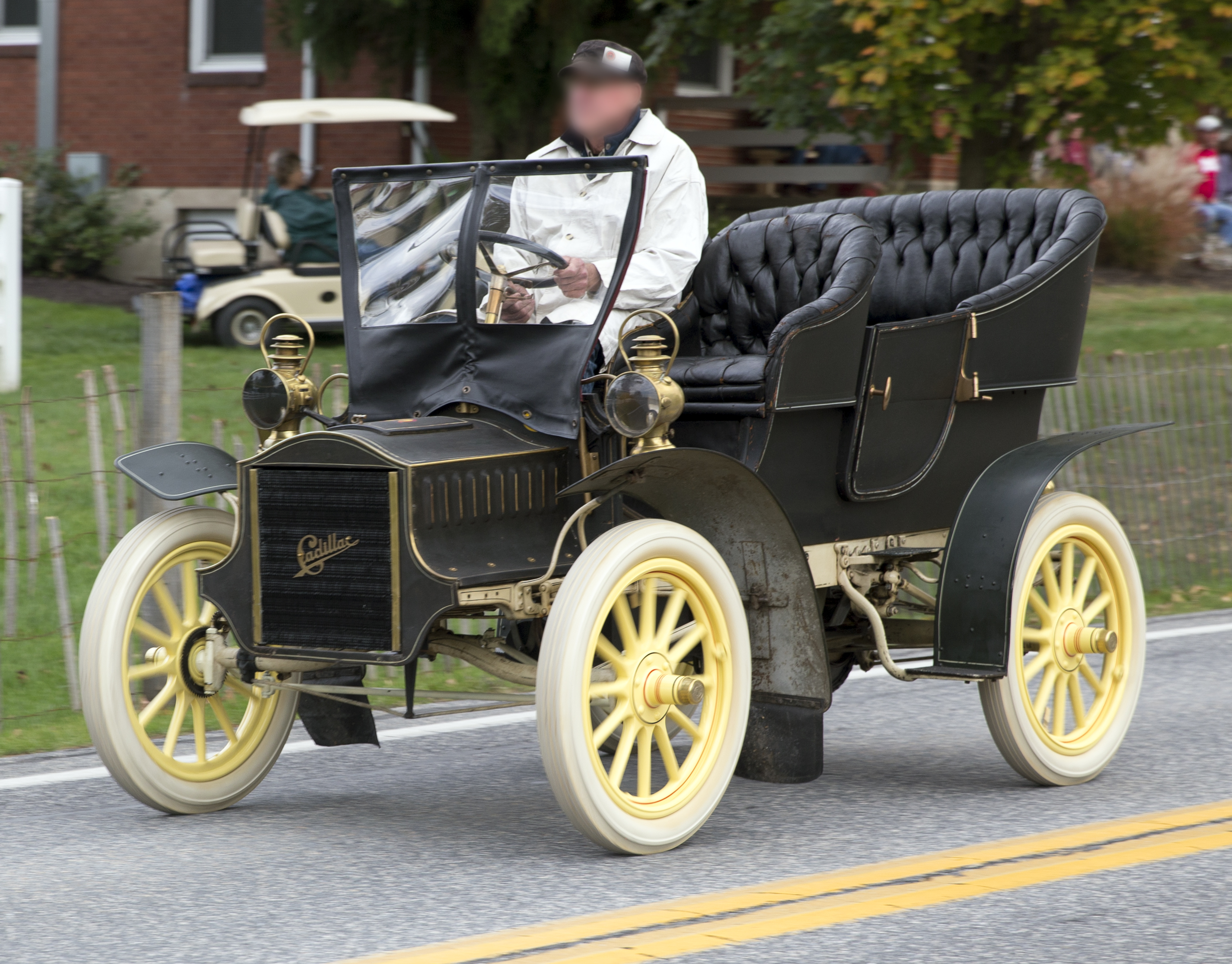
Model F touring car 1905 side-entrance tonneau

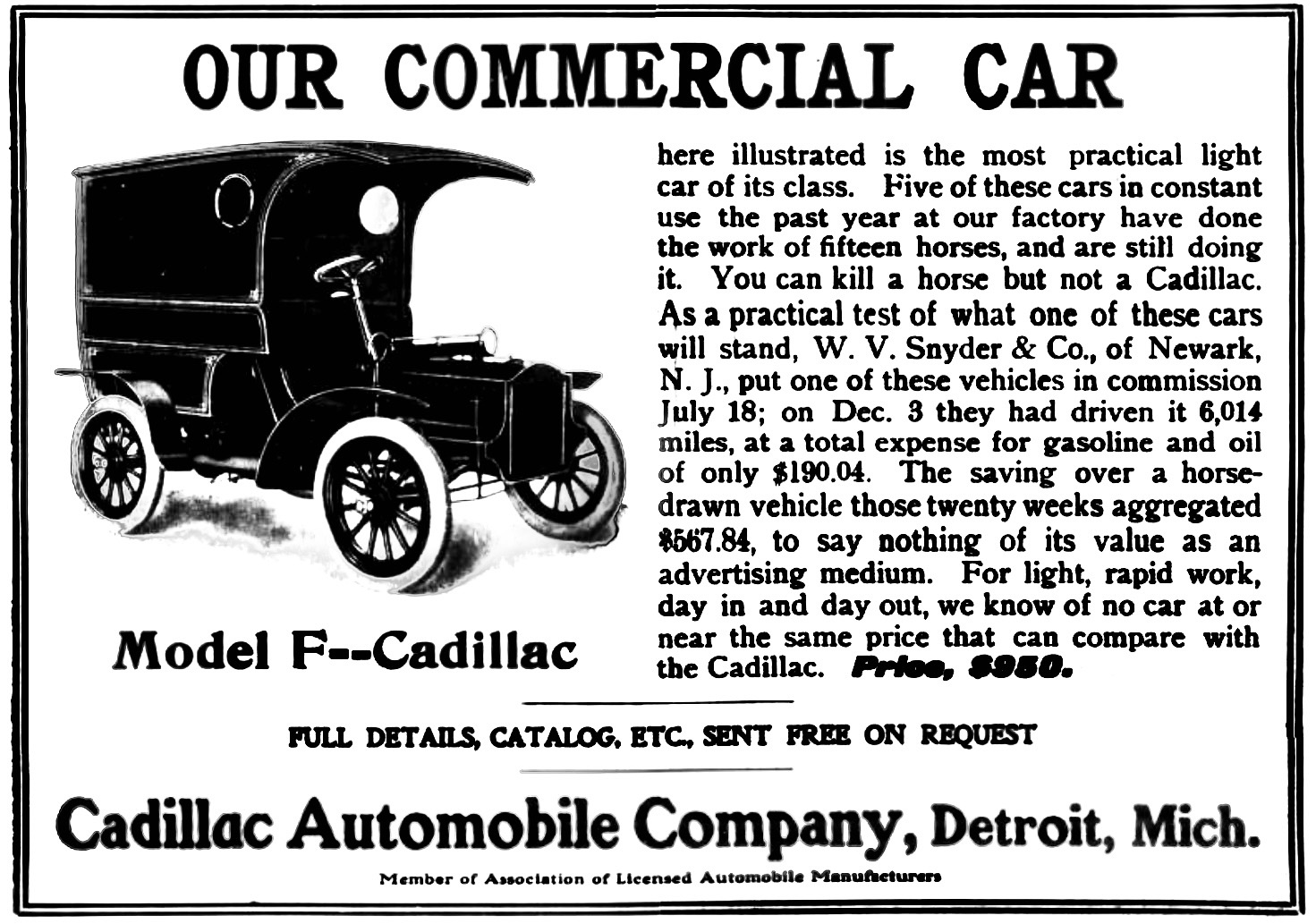
Cadillac Model F Delivery Wagon (1905) 0,5 to

The Model F was the primary new Cadillac model of 1905. It had a sharper hood and radiator, prompting the update of the Model B (which became the Model C) and even spawning an aftermarket of updates to existing Model A and Model B cars. Models E and F shared the same chassis, though the latter was lengthened by two inches

The Model F was available as either a 4-seater 2-door touring car with side-entrance to the fixed tonneau or a 2-seater delivery vehicle. Both were priced at $950 in 1905. The Model F shared the same 76 in (1,900 mm) wheelbase as had been used on the Model B.

== Model G, Model H and Model L (1906) ==
Four cylinder engine, see separate article Cadillac Model D

== Model K and Model M (1906–1908) ==
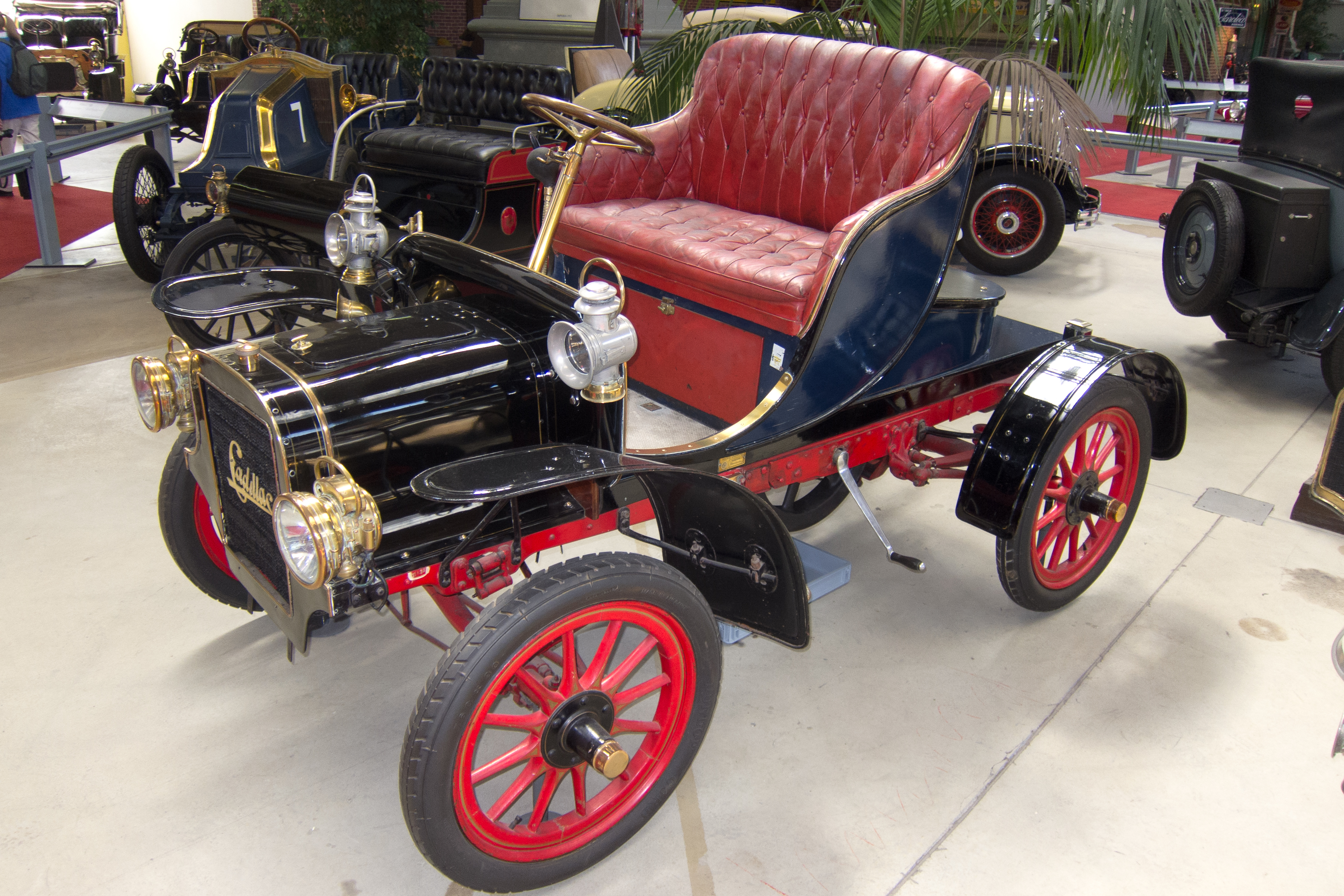
Model K runabout 1907

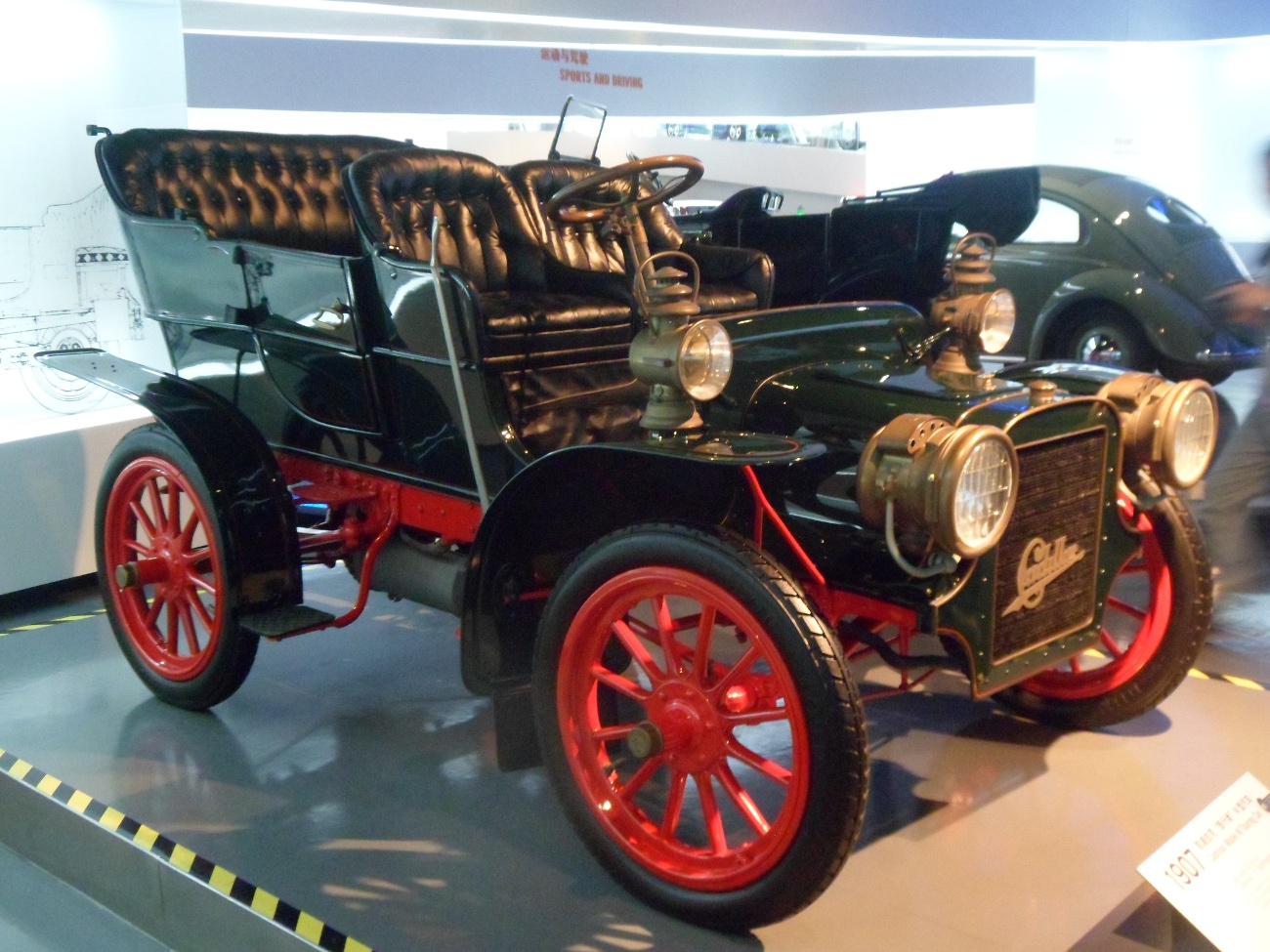
Model M touring car 1907

Cadillac's single-cylinder lineup was consolidated into two models for 1906, the short wheelbase Model K and long wheelbase Model M. Priced at $750 for the Model K or $950 for the Model M, 3,650 units were sold that year. The K and M were essentially similar to the Models E and F from 1905 but with updated bodies. Production and sale of the Models K and M continued in 1907 in both the Tulip and straight lined body styles. The Model M was offered with a delivery body in 1906 and again for the 1907 model year.

Three 1907 Model Ks were used in the famous Dewar Trophy test of the Royal Automobile Club in England. They were disassembled, the parts mixed, and then reassembled without problems. This test cemented the Cadillac's reputation for precision and quality and brought fame to the marque.

The Model M continued only as a commercial delivery vehicle for 1908, priced at US$950 ($32,826 in 2025 dollars).

== Model S and Model T (1908) ==
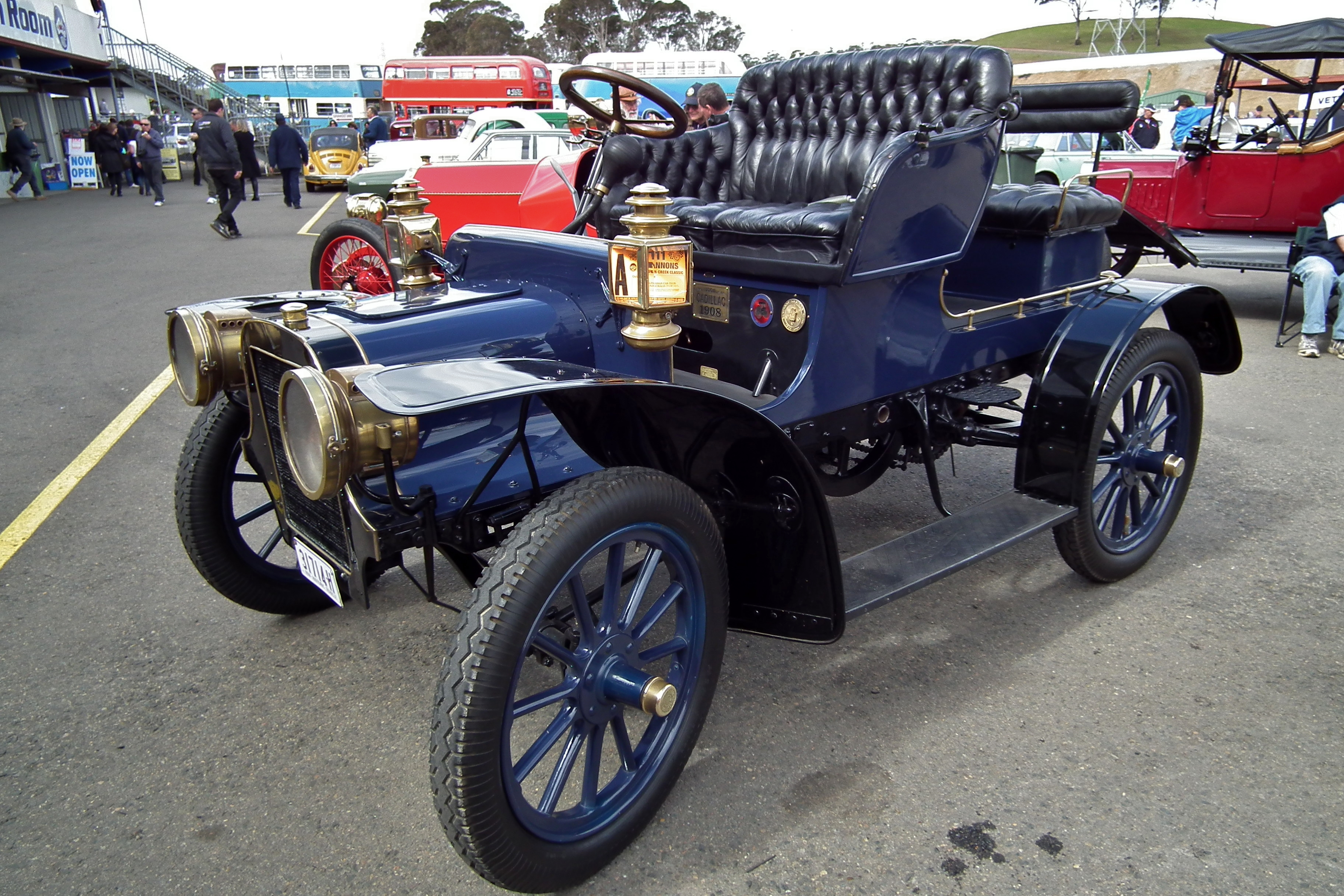
Model S runabout with dickey seat

The Model S and Model T of 1908 were essentially versions of the K/M from previous years with the wheelbase extended to 82 in (2,100 mm). These would be the last single-cylinder Cadillacs. For 1909 the lineup standardized on the four-cylinder Model Thirty. The main difference between the S and T was that the latter lacked running boards.

== See also ==
- List of Cadillac models
