= Cadillac Series 355 =

Cadillac Series 355/A/B/C/D/E
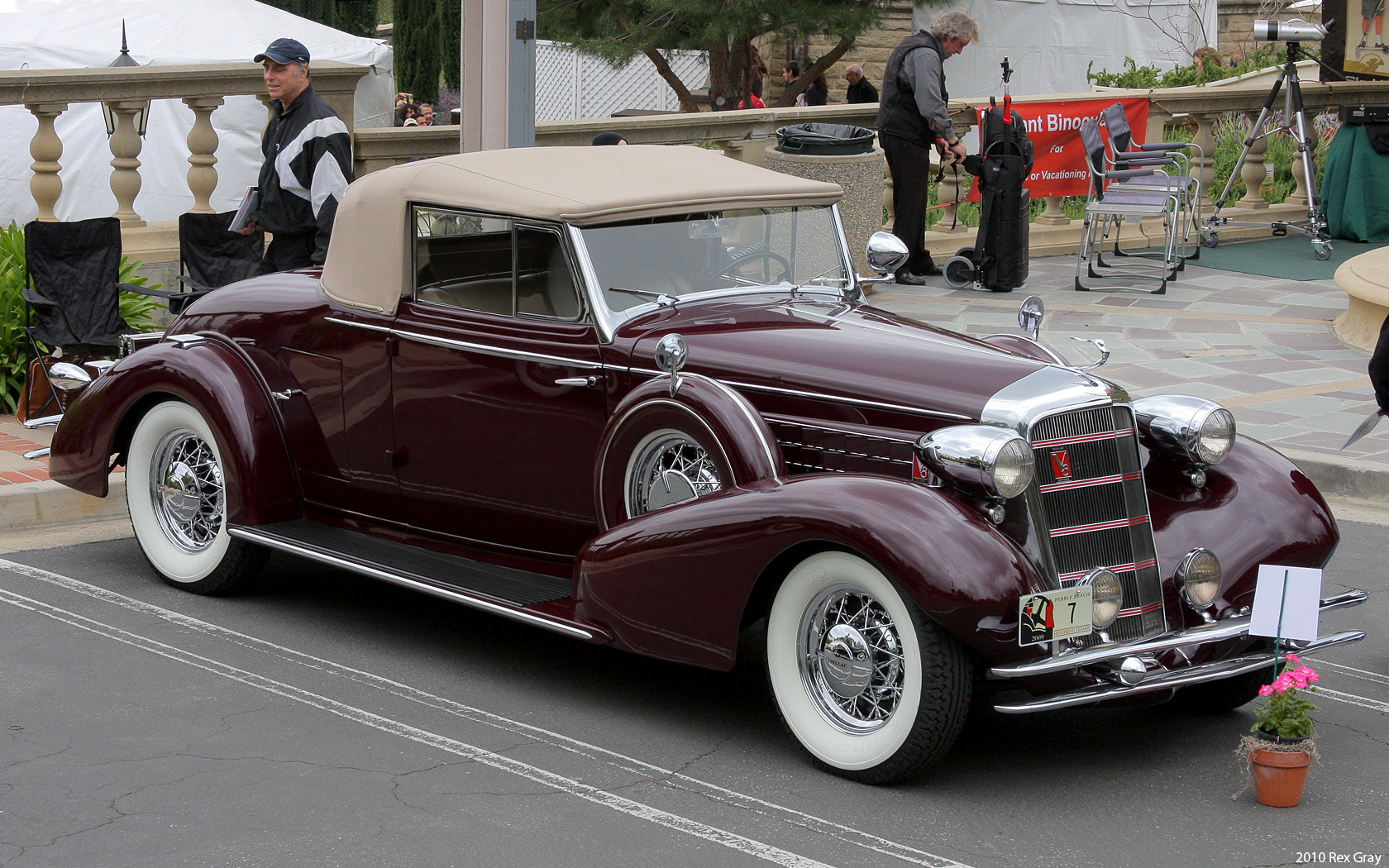
- 1934 Cadillac Series 355D

Overview
- Manufacturer: Cadillac (General Motors)
- Model years: 1931–1935
- Assembly: Detroit Assembly, Detroit, Michigan, United States
- Designer: Harley Earl

Body and chassis
- Class: Full-size luxury car
- Body style: 2-door convertible 4-door convertible 2-door coupe 4-door sedan 4-door town car 4-door limousine
- Layout: Front-engine, rear-wheel-drive
- Platform: GM C platform
- Related: Cadillac Series 452; Cadillac Series 370; Buick Limited; Buick Roadmaster; Oldsmobile L-Series

Powertrain
- Engine: 355 cu in (5.8 L) L-Head V8
- Transmission: 3-speed synchromesh manual

Dimensions
- Wheelbase: 1931: 134.0 in (3,404 mm); 1932–33: 134.0 in (3,404 mm) and 140.0 in (3,556 mm); 1934–35: 128.0 in (3,251 mm) and 136.0 in (3,454 mm); Commercial: 1931: 152.0 in (3,861 mm); 1932–33: 156.0 in (3,962 mm); 1935: 160.0 in (4,064 mm)
- Length: 1931: 203.0 in (5,156 mm); 1932–33: 207.0 in (5,258 mm) and 213.0 in (5,410 mm); 1934–35: 207.5 in (5,270 mm) and 215.5 in (5,474 mm)
- Width: 1931: 73.6 in (1,869 mm); 1932–35: 77.0 in (1,956 mm)
- Height: 1931: 72.5 in (1,842 mm); 1932–33: 71.5 in (1,816 mm); 1934–35: 69.5 in (1,765 mm)
- Curb weight: 4,600–5,100 lb (2,100–2,300 kg)

Chronology
- Predecessor: Cadillac Series 353
- Successor: Cadillac Series 70/75

The Cadillac Series 355 is a V8-powered luxury car manufactured by Cadillac from 1931 until 1935. It was offered as a 2-door club coupe, 2-door convertible, 4-door convertible, 4-door sedan, 4-door town car, and 4-door limousine. It provided a range of Cadillac below the maker's larger V-12 and V-16 lines. It was succeeded by the Cadillac Series 70/75.

== Models ==
=== 355A (1931) ===
The 1931 Series 355A was very similar to the Series 353 except it was longer and lower, had a longer hood with five hood ports, with matching doors in the cowl. There was a modified coach sill with no compartments in the splash pan. The battery and tool compartment were relocated under the front seat. Floor boards were made of metal for the first time. The instrument panel was oval with the same gauge groupings as in the Series 353. The Series 355 featured a radiator screen, a single bar bumper and dual horns. The headlight diameter was reduced by one inch. There was a new frame with divergent side rails. The suspension springs gained metal covers. The radiator was mounted lower in the frame and there and received a condenser tank for cooling operation. The engine was the same 353 cu in (5.8 L) L-Head V8 as on the Series 353, thus the series designation no longer matched the displacement as had been the basis for the "series" naming convention. Engine horsepower was 95. A five-point engine suspension, similar to the V-16 was used. An intake muffler was added, and the distributor was mounted 1.5 in (38 mm) higher. The fan was mounted lower to match the lower radiator. Model year sales totaled 10,717.

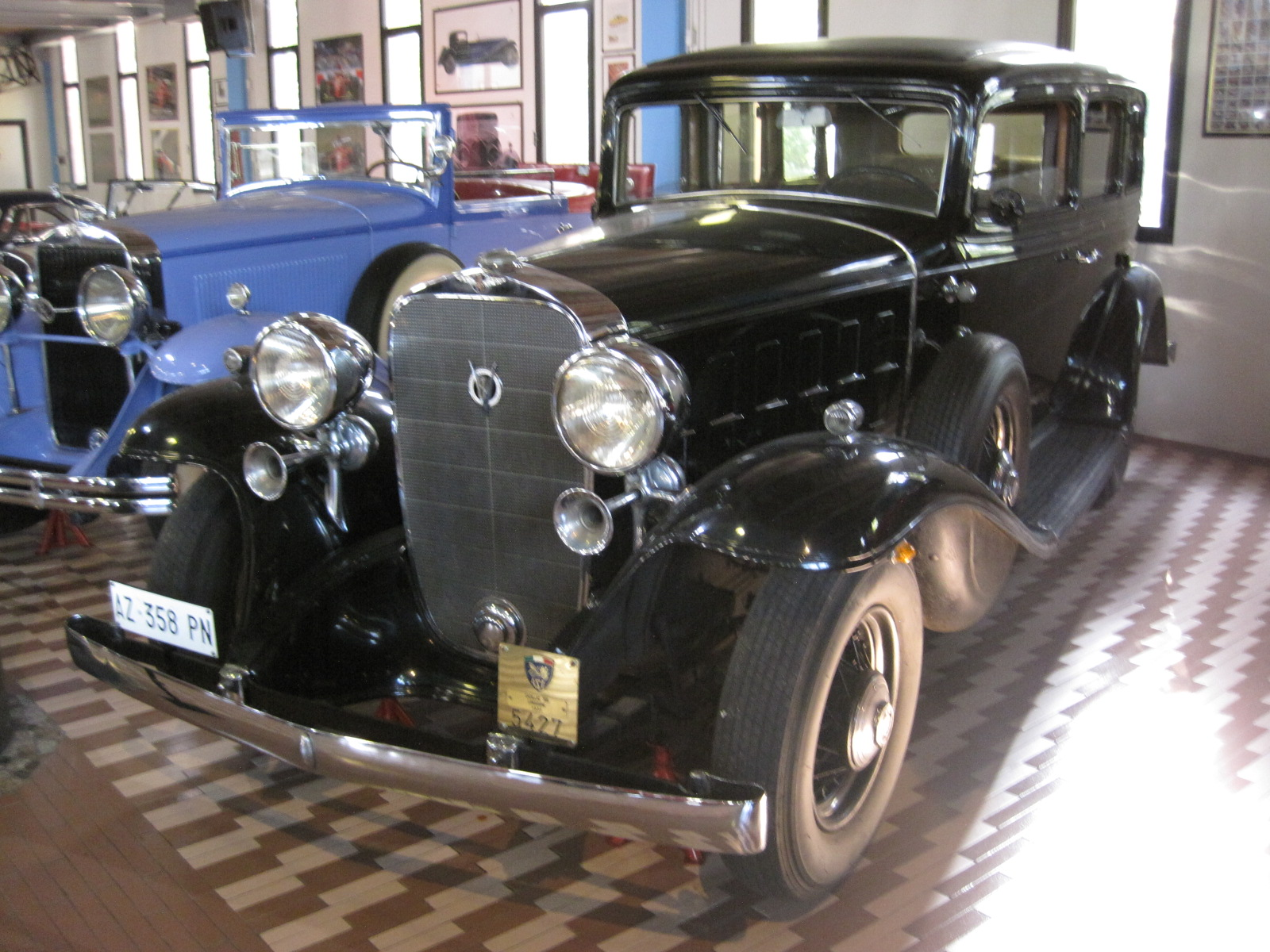
1931 Cadillac Series 355A

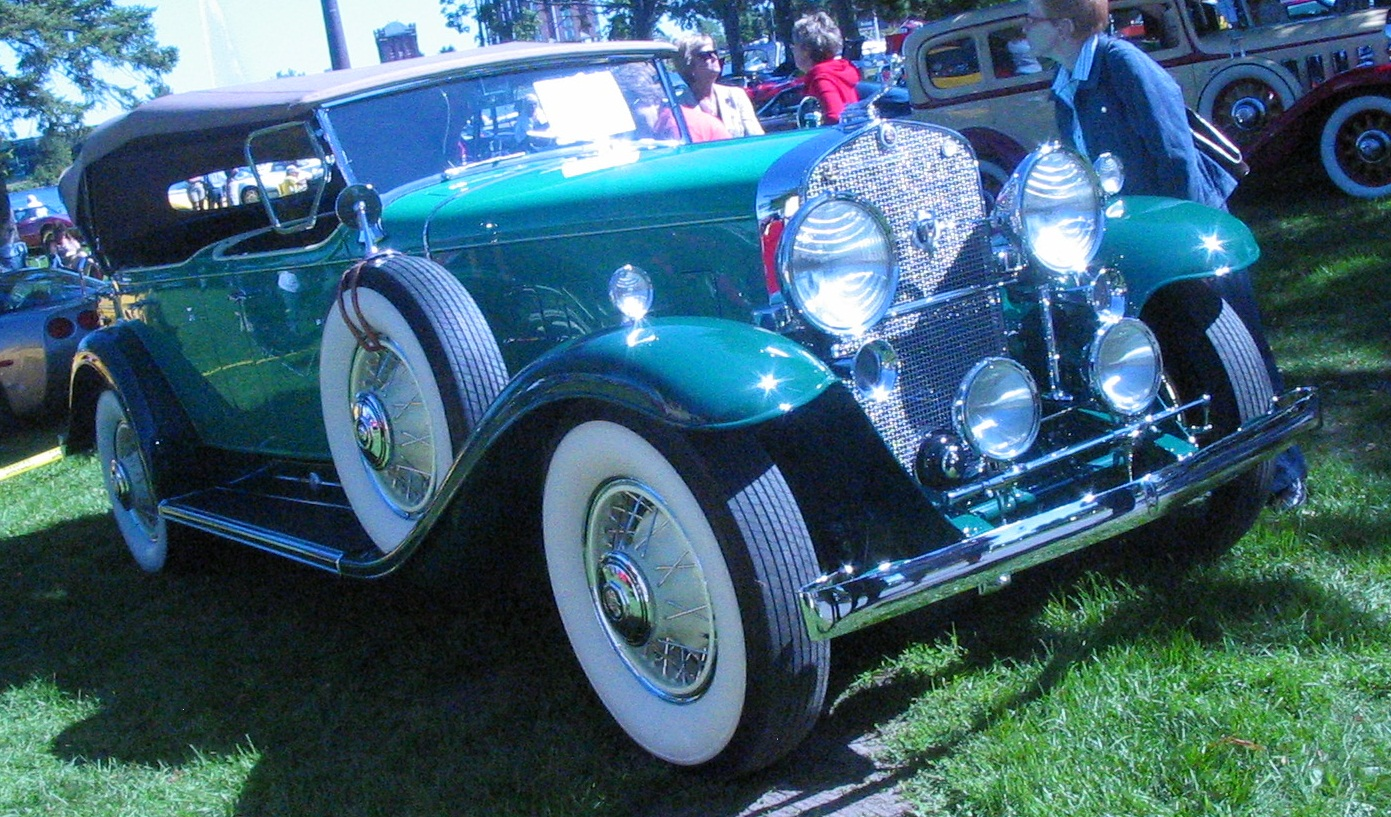
1931 Cadillac Series 355A Phaeton

=== 355B (1932) ===
The 1932 Series 355B was even longer and lower, with an entirely restyled front assembly. The roof line was lowered 1–3 in (25–76 mm). The longer hood had six hood ports. The new front end styling included a flat grille built into the radiator shell, head and side lights of streamlined bullet shape and the elimination of the fender tie bar and monogram bar. The trumpets of the dual horns projected through the headlight stanchions. The headlight lenses were 9.5 in (241 mm) in diameter. The dual taillights matched the headlights. Headlights featured three filament bulbs and four contour positions for degree and angle of illumination. The front license plate was mounted on the bumper. Running boards curved to match the sweep of the front fenders and blended into the rear fenders. The tail of the rear fenders blended into the fuel tank valence. The trunk on the town sedan, town coupe and five-passenger convertible coupe was integral with the body. The vision of the driver was improved by 30 percent as a result of the elimination of the outside visor and the construction of a 12 degree sloping windshield and corner posts. There was a large ventilator on top of the cowl and none on the sides. All separate body moldings were eliminated. A three spoke steering wheel enabled an unobstructed view of the instrument cluster when in the straight ahead position. The right side of the instrument panel was occupied by a "locker." Engine horsepower increased to 115. The deepening Great Depression caused sales plummet to 2,700.

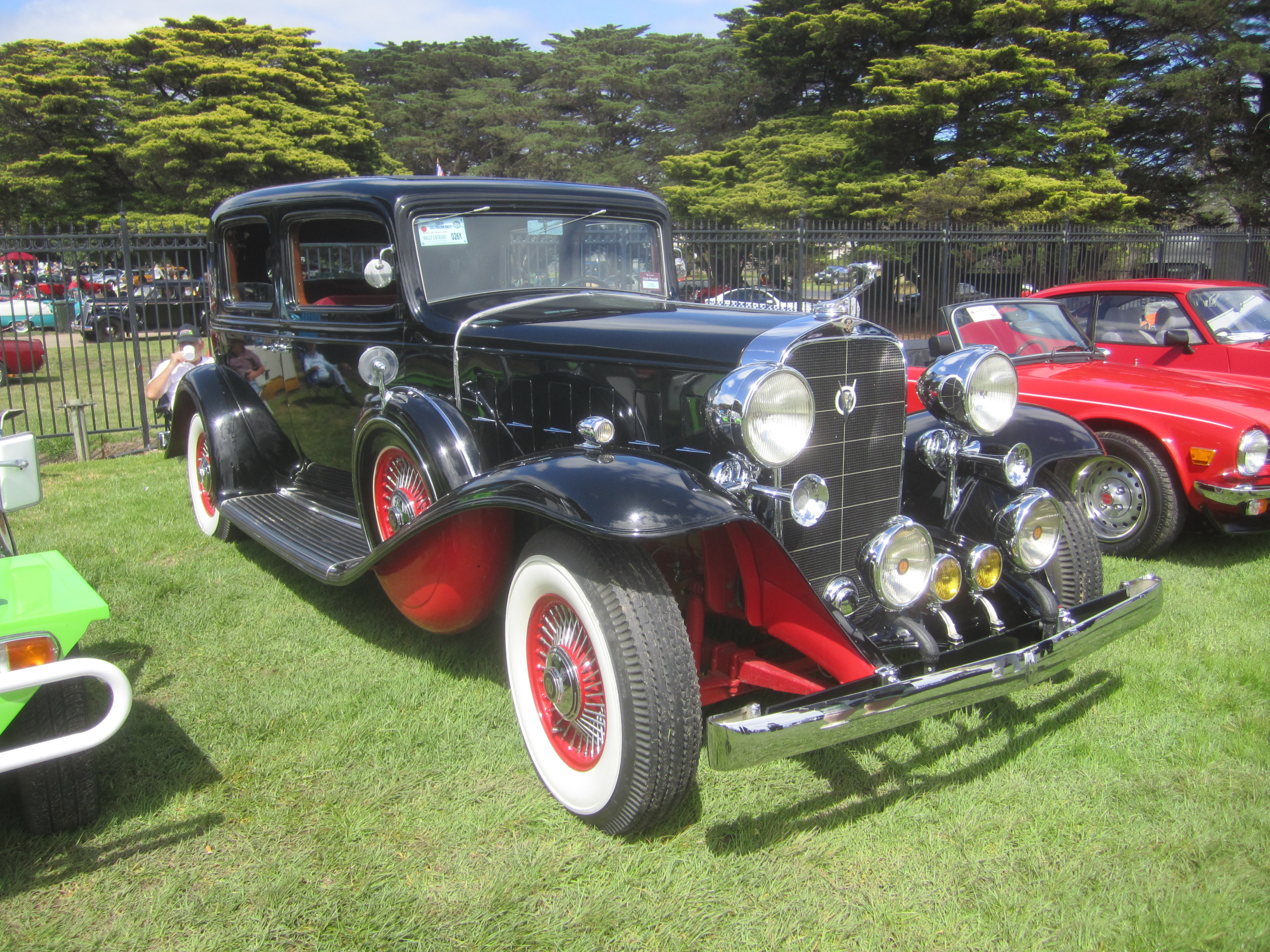
1932 Cadillac Series 355B

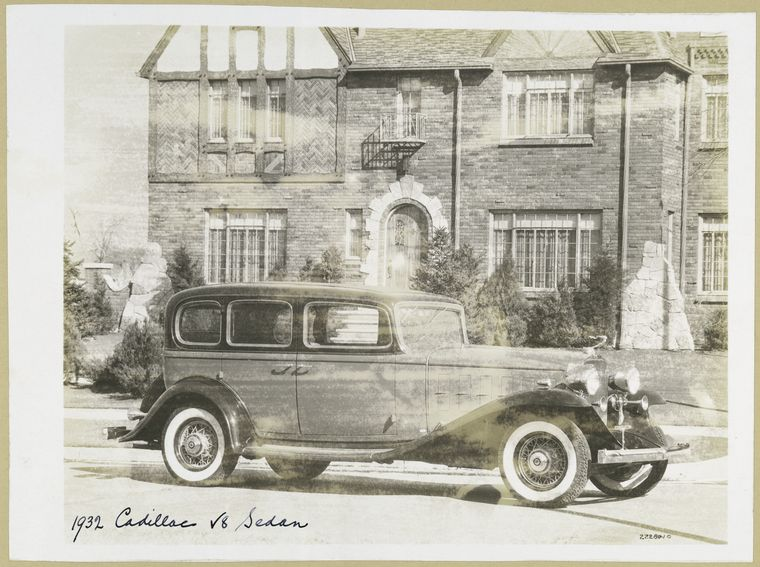
1932 Cadillac Series 355B

=== 355C (1933) ===
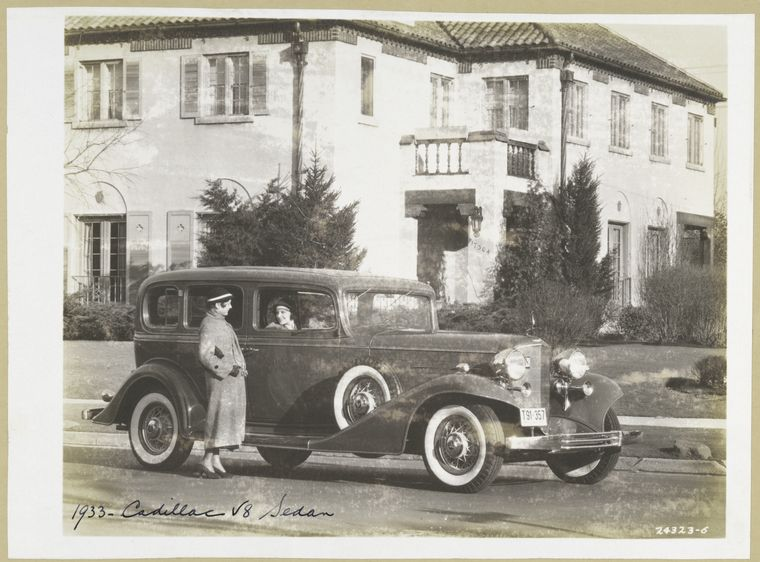
1933 Cadillac Series 355C

In 1933, the aesthetics of all Cadillacs were updated with a new, corporate "streamlined" appearance shared with all GM cars for that year credited to GM's Art and Color Studio headed by Harley Earl. The bumpers on the 1933 Series 355C were sectioned, with plain ends and a three bar center. The grille was made V-shaped and blended into the painted (chrome optional) radiator shell. The radiator cap disappeared under the hood on the right side (same side as the oil level gauge). The fender tie bar, after a year's absence was sectioned and the center section was hidden behind the grille. Six horizontal doors replaced the vertical hood doors. Front and rear fender skirts were optional. The most significant change in body detail was the introduction of "No Draft Individually Controlled Ventilation" (ICV) or pivoting vent windows in the front doors and the rear quarter or rear door windows. In early production the front door window had to be lowered to disengage the channel at its front edge from the vent window to allow the vent window to pivot. In later production the sealing channel was attached to the door frame rather than to the window glass so that the vent window could be operated independently of the window glass. Windshield and rear quarter windows were made stationary. The vent windows were an optional feature on all GM vehicles beginning in 1933. Absence of a windshield operating mechanism on the closed car allowed room to conceal the wiper motor behind the headboard. The cowl ventilator was baffled and drained in such a way as to be rainproof. Chassis changes were few and minor in nature. Controlled free wheeling was discontinued. Vacuum assist was added to the brake system. Changes in shock absorber valves extended the range of the ride control system. During the model year the dual point four lobe distributor was replaced by a single point eight lobe unit. A radio was optional. Model year sales were 2,100.

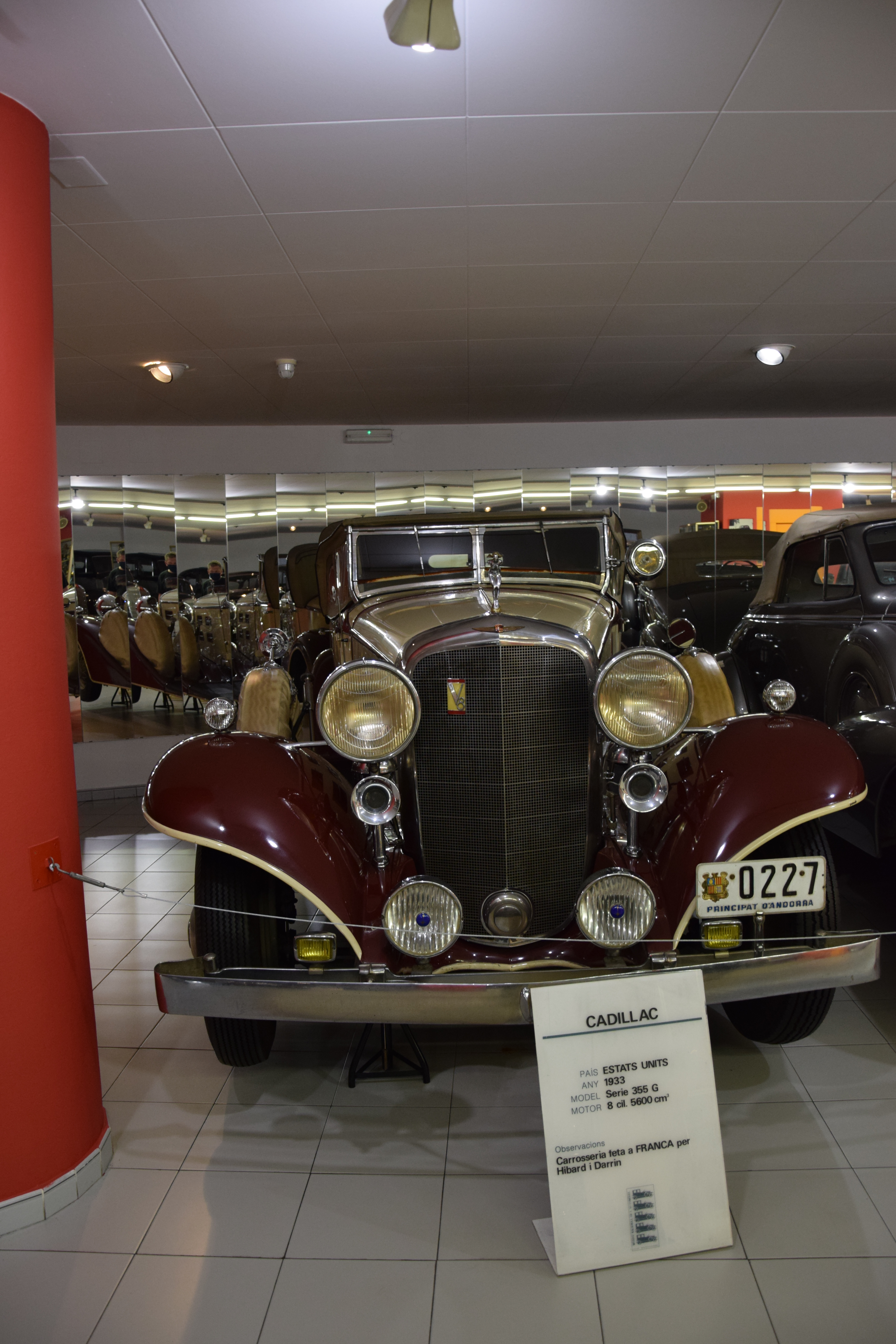
1933 Cadillac Series 355C Coupe by Hibbard & Darrin

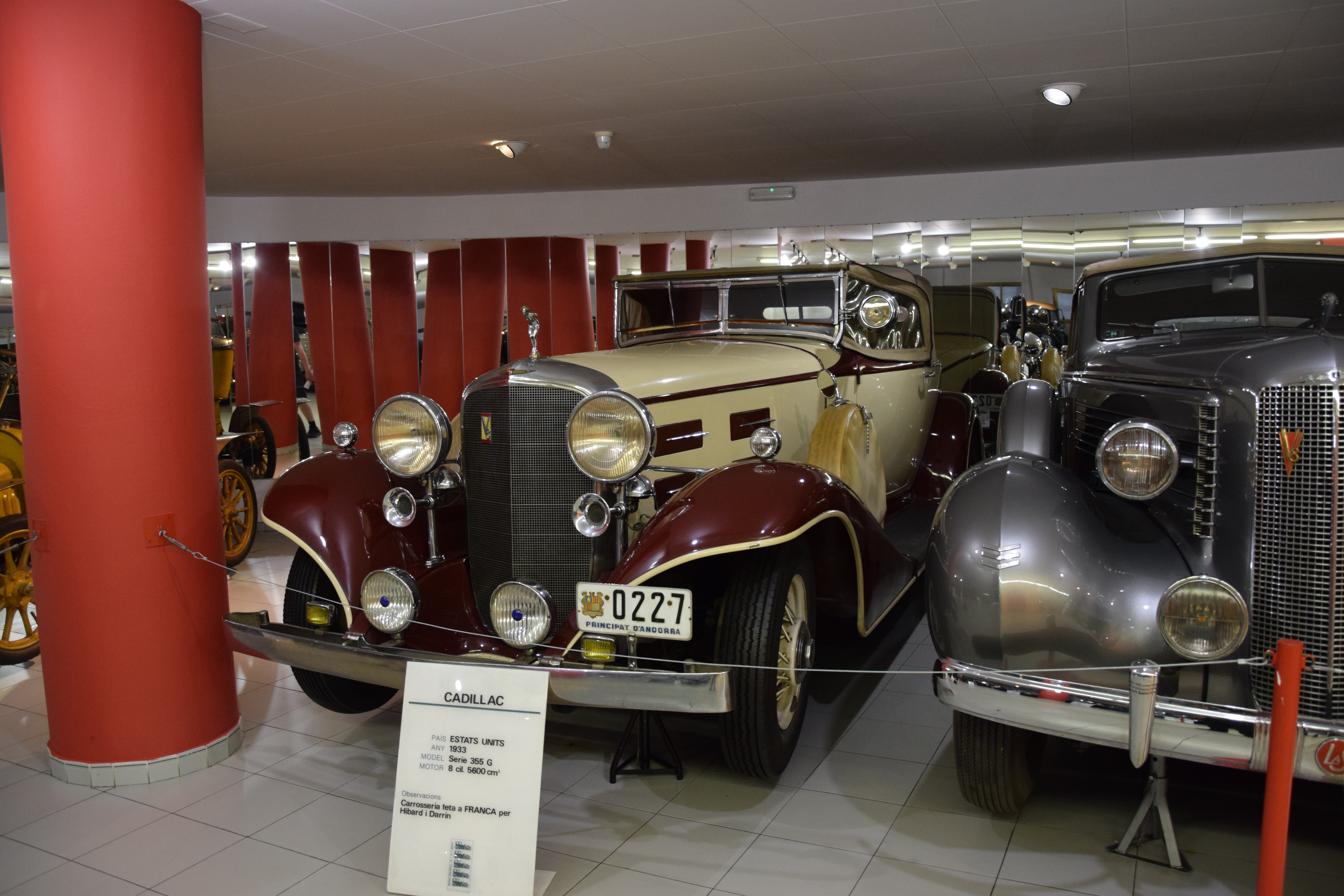
1933 Cadillac Series 355C Coupe by Hibbard & Darrin

=== 355D (1934) ===
The 1934 Model 355D was completely restyled and mounted on an entirely new chassis but used the same engine as in 1933. The Model 355 was divided into three series, the Series 10, 20 and 30. Bodies on the Series 10 and 20 were built by Fisher and on the Series 30 by Fleetwood, the latter shared with the Cadillac V-12 and V-16. Styling emphasized streamlining, including concealment of all chassis features except the wheels. Body construction was improved for better insulation against engine heat and reduction of engine, road and wind noise. Bumpers were a stylish but ineffective biplane design, mounted against telescoping springs. The grille was V-shaped and sloping, set into a painted shell. Although restricted use of chrome was a feature of the overall ornamentation, a chrome plated radiator shell was available as an option. Horns and radiator filler cap were concealed under the hood. Teardrop Guide Multibeam headlights were mounted on streamlined supports attached to the fenders. Parking lamps were mounted on the headlight supports. Airfoil shaped fenders were brought low over the chassis. The hood sills were high with the entire fender shape molded into the radiator shell. Hoods extending nearly to the windshield carried shutter-type louvers in the side panel. Windshields were fixed and steeply sloping; 18 degrees on Fisher bodies, 25 degrees flat or a 29.5 degree V on Fleetwood bodies. Cowl vents opened toward the windshield; one vent on flat windshield bodies, two vents projecting through openings in the hood on V-shaped windshield bodies. Bodies were 2.0 in (51 mm) lower than on previous models. Added passenger space in the front compartment was achieved by moving the hand brake lever to the left of the driver, under the instrument panel. Rear fenders were airfoil shaped and carried rear lights that matched the headlights. The gas tank filler was on the left side at the rear of the body, on Fleetwood bodies in the left rear fender. All bodies featured beaver tail deck that completely covered the chassis. On Fleetwood bodies, the spare was concealed under the rear deck, unless optional fender mounts were specified. Independent front suspension was introduced, called "knee-action". Engine horsepower increased to 120.

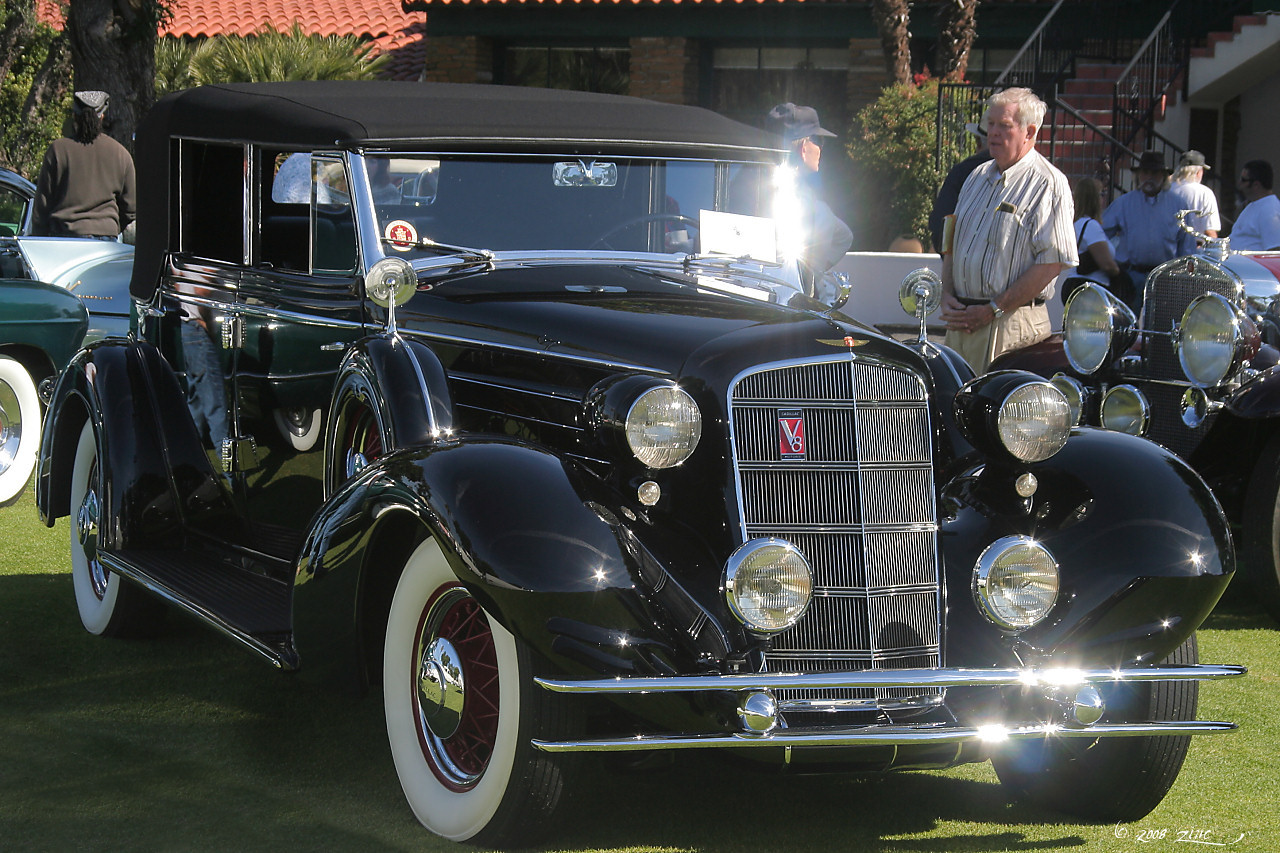
1934 Cadillac Series 355D Convertible Sedan

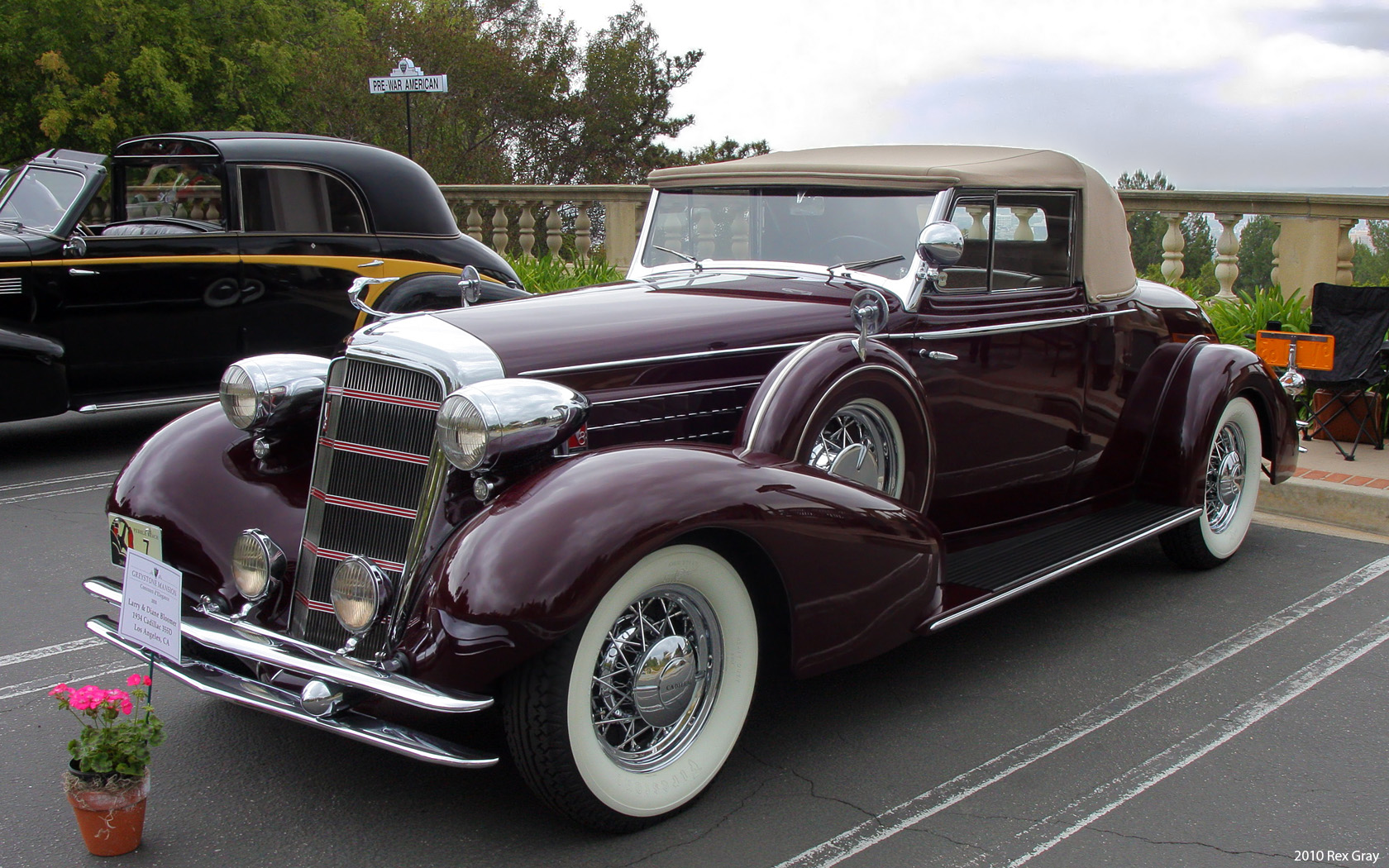
1934 Cadillac Series 355D Coupe

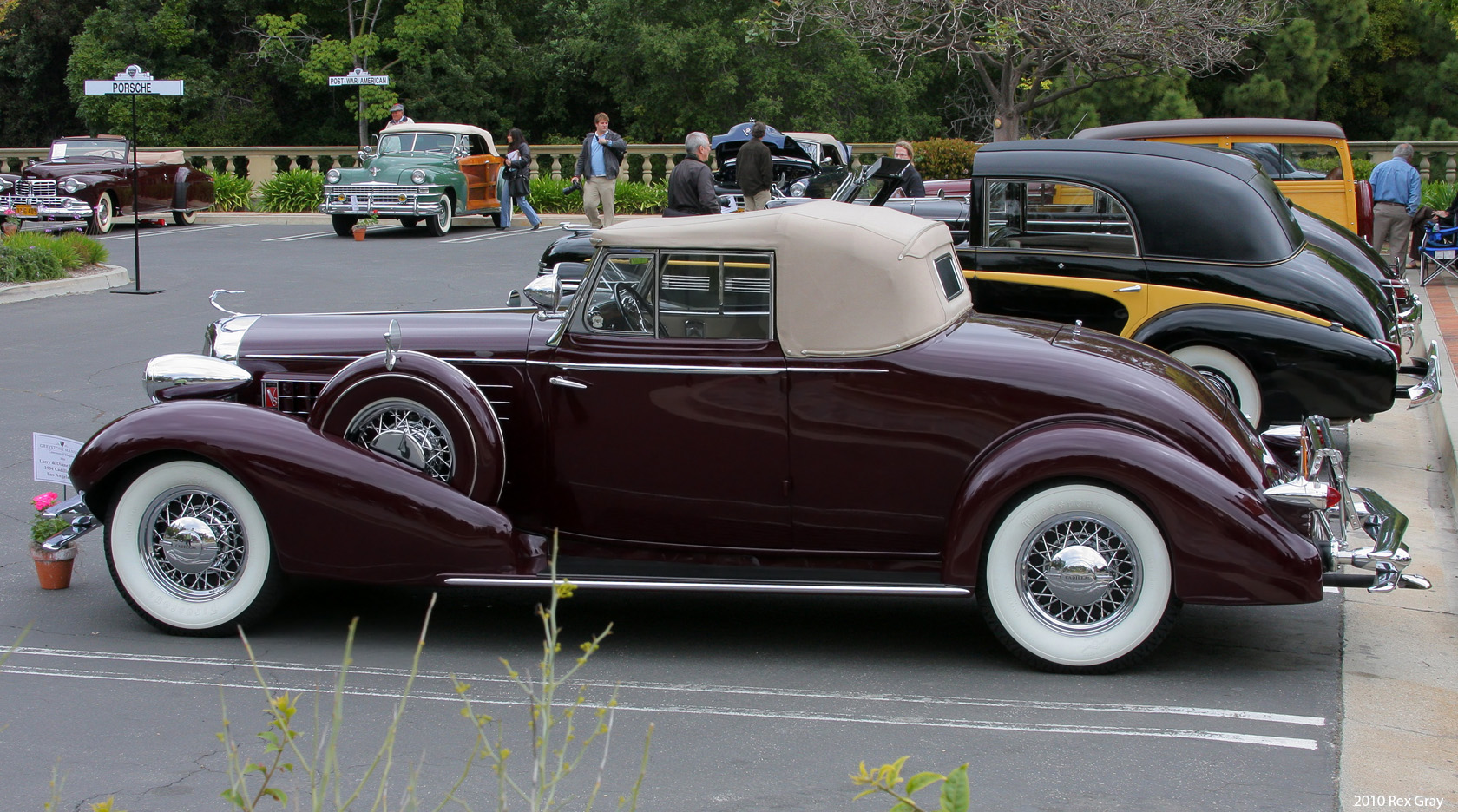
1934 Cadillac Series 355D

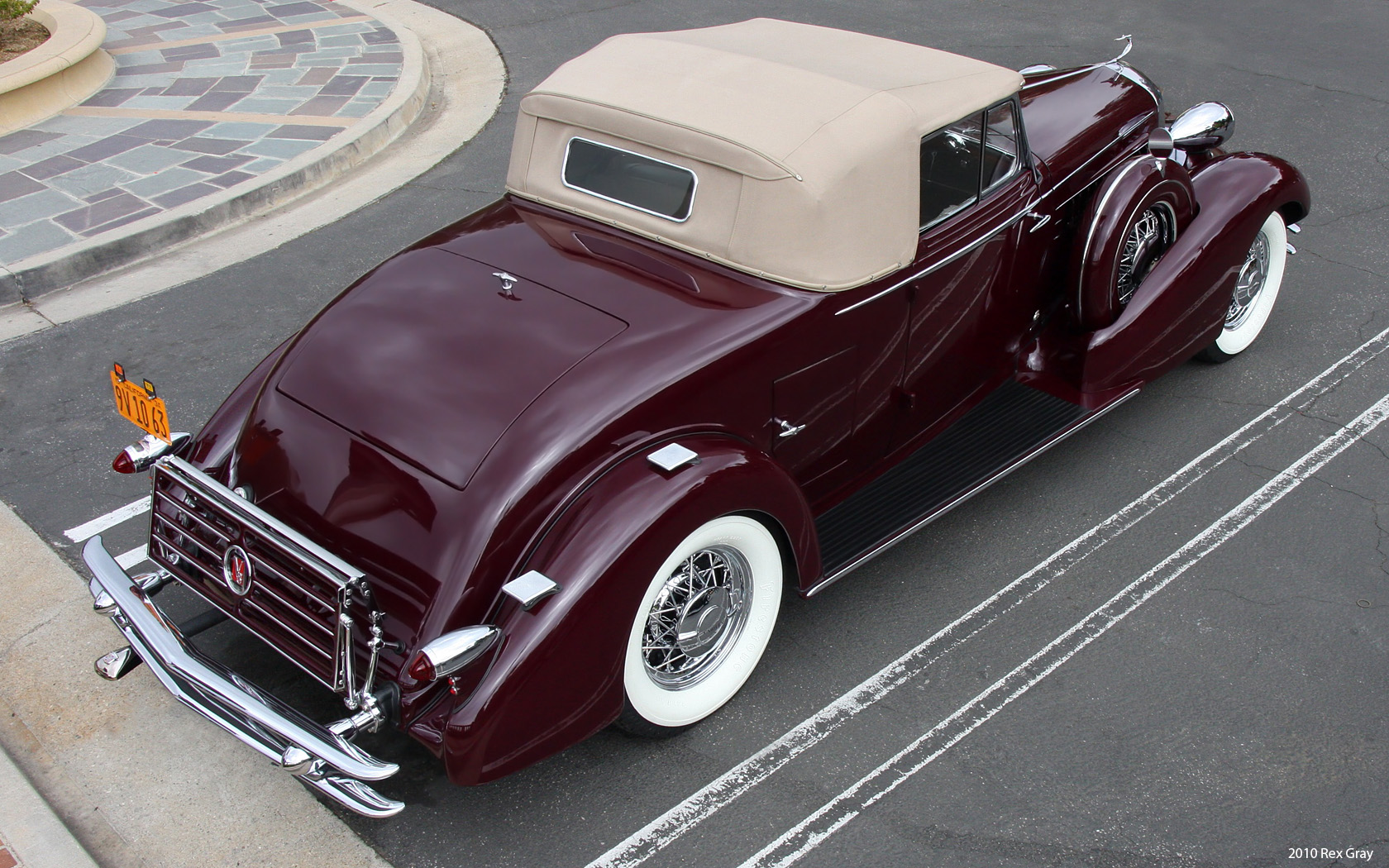
1934 Cadillac Series 355D (rear)

=== 355E (1935) ===
The 1935 Model 355E remained virtually unchanged from 1934. The biplane bumpers of 1934 were replaced with more conventional units. One major change was introduced on Fisher bodies, the all steel "Turret Top", extended to Fleetwood bodies as well the following year. Having been associated with funeral and ambulance equipment for many years, Cadillac embarked on an extra effort to consolidate this business in 1935 in its Fleetwood works. Three Fleetwood bodied seven passenger livery sedans were offered on the Series 30 chassis. Additionally a 160 in (4,060 mm) wheelbase commercial chassis was offered for hearse and ambulance adaptation. Engine horsepower increased yet again to 130. Combined model year sales for 1934 and 1935 totaled 8,318.

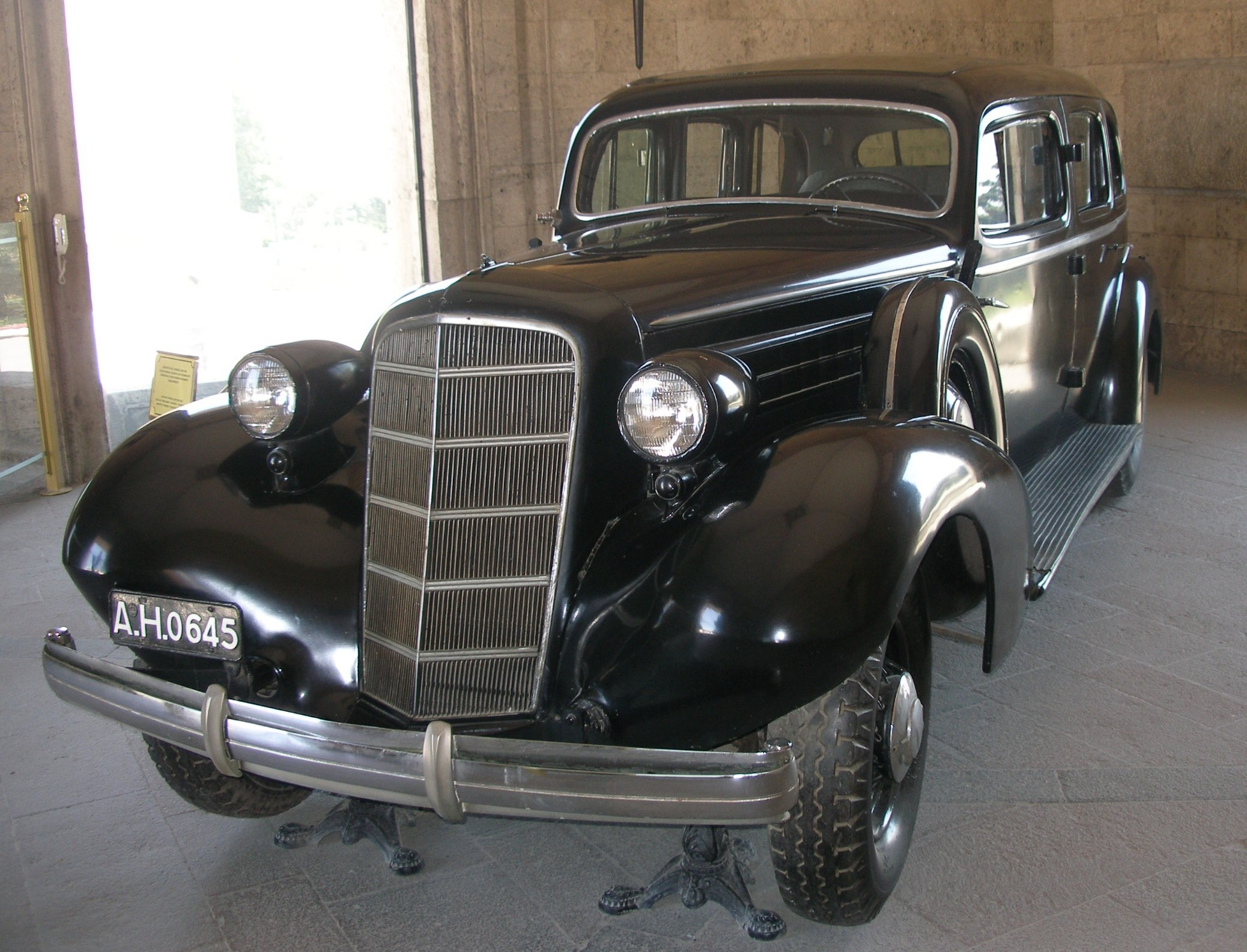
Kemal Atatürk's 1935 Cadillac Series 355E

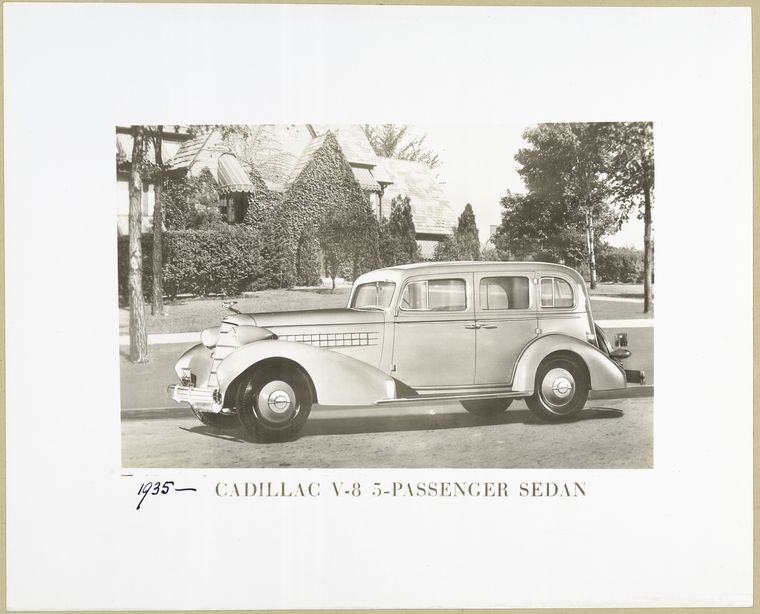
1935 Cadillac Series 355E
