= Cadillac Type V-63 =

Cadillac V-63
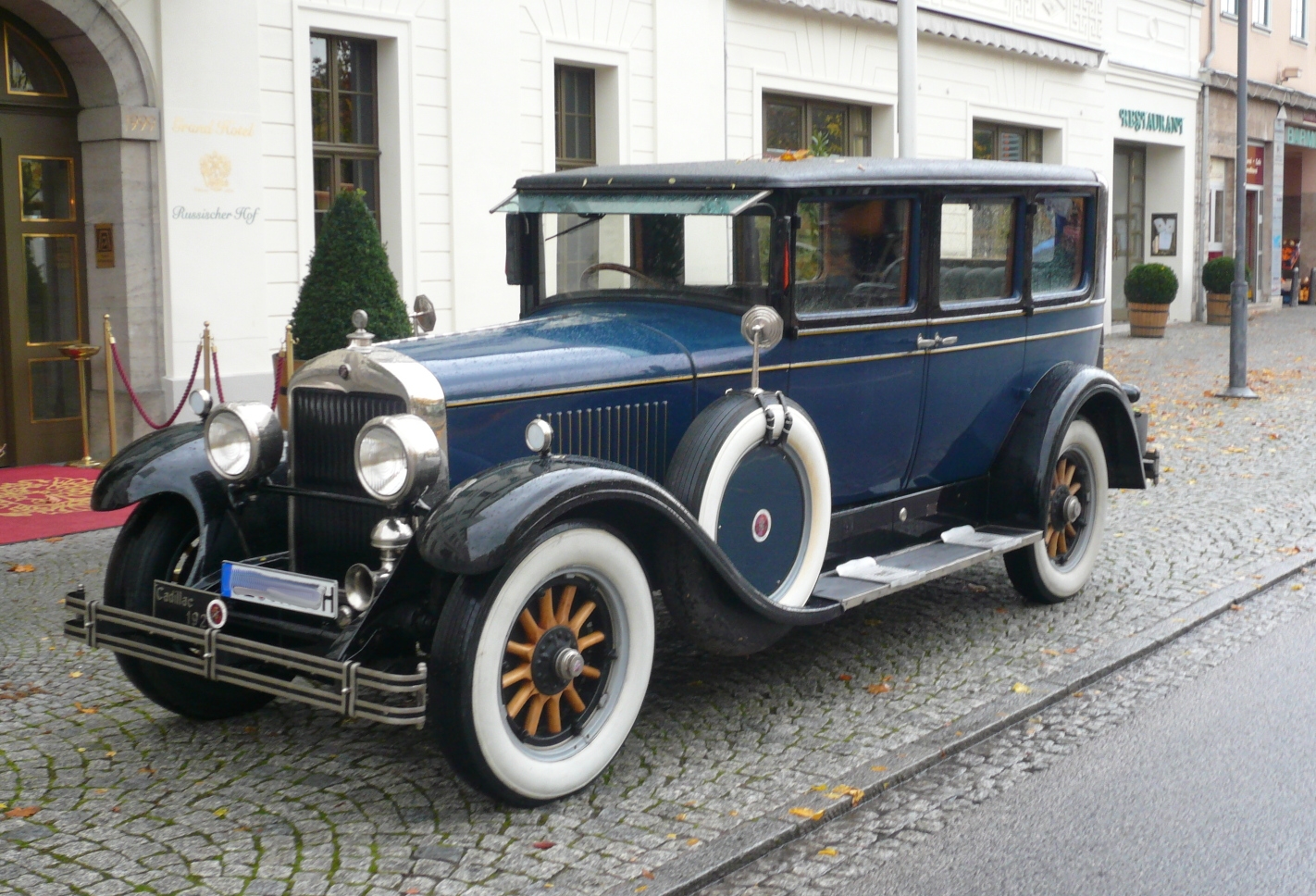
- 1927 Cadillac Series 314 Sedan

Overview
- Manufacturer: Cadillac (General Motors)
- Model years: 1924–1931
- Assembly: United States: Detroit, Michigan (Detroit Assembly)

Body and chassis
- Class: luxury car
- Layout: Front-engine, rear-wheel-drive
- Platform: GM C platform

Powertrain
- Engine: 314 cu in (5.1 L) L-head V8; 341 cu in (5.6 L) L-head V8; 353 cu in (5.8 L) L-head V8
- Transmission: 3-speed synchromesh manual

Dimensions
- Wheelbase: 132 in (3,353 mm); 138 in (3,505 mm); 140 in (3,556 mm); 145 in (3,683 mm); 150 in (3,810 mm); 152 in (3,861 mm)

Chronology
- Predecessor: Cadillac Type 51
- Successor: Cadillac Series 355

The Cadillac V-63 is a large luxury automobile that was introduced in September 1923 by Cadillac as a 1924 model, replacing the previous Type 61. It used the GM C platform. It was replaced by the Cadillac Series 355 in 1931. It retained the name Cadillac V8 introduced with the previous generation Cadillac Type 51.

The V-63 used an improved version of the L-head V8 engine that made Cadillac famous. The main innovation was a cross-plane crankshaft which improved balance and smoothness. This design required complex mathematical analysis, and was simultaneously patented by Peerless. Both companies agreed to share the innovation, which became a market distinction being able to exclusively offer a V8. For model year 1924, the Packard Eight straight-eight was now a competitor due to its reduced vibration. The body style choices were expanded to 14 while commercial applications weren't offered. New innovations included the availability of Balloon tires mounted on either wire wheels or steel pressed discs, while wooden wheels made of hickory were standard equipment along with the availability of front-wheel brakes.

The most noticeable update for 1925 was the introduction of two classifications of body style choices. The "Standard" bodies was added for 1925 that offered a five-passenger Brougham, two passenger Coupe, four passenger Victoria, a five- and seven passenger Sedan and a seven-passenger Imperial limousine. A higher content "Custom" body styles offered a Roadster, Touring Car, Phaeton, five passenger Coupe and Sedan, seven passenger Suburban with the top level seven passenger Imperial limousine, while the mechanicals and chassis were otherwise largely unchanged. Coachwork continued to be offered by Fisher Body who was the primary supplier of all GM products at this time, and Duco automotive lacquer paint, introduced by DuPont was the first quick drying multi-color line of nitrocellulose lacquers made especially for the automotive industry. The introduction of lacquer paint afforded the clients with a choice of 24 matched color choices along with 10 different upholstery patterns. The retail prices listed started as low as US$2,995 ($54,984 in 2025 dollars) for the Brougham, while the top level Imperial limousine was listed at US$4,485 ($82,338 in 2025 dollars).

== Series 314, 341 and 353 (1926-1930) ==
The naming convention was refreshed for 1926 as the Series 314 signifying the engine displacement, with a further enlargement to 341 in 1928. The previous "Custom" line used the 138" wheelbase while the "Standard" line remained with the 132" wheelbase. The New V8 was introduced as the "New Ninety Degree Cadillac" making note of engineering improvements while retaining the flathead architecture. The chassis, body and engineering was shared with the all-new LaSalle Series 303 and also used the V8 but with a 303 cu in (5.0 L) engine displacement. The commercial chassis returned, offering both an ambulance and hearse while bodywork was now supplied by Superior. 1926 was the year the Chrysler Imperial was first introduced, and the rivalry continued for several decades.

Cadillac identified all products built every year by engraving a number on the engine and all changes made during a model production were recorded by engine number, which affected parts for repair and correct paint number codes. Starting with the Series 314 a unit and car number was instituted which meant each car was assigned an engine number engraved on the engine block and a corresponding plate attached to the firewall to aid in vehicle registration. Cadillac also instituted marketing changes for its products to break away from industry established trends every year. Previously, cars were advertised with the model or series designation along with the name "Cadillac". With the introduction of the Series 314, it was simply advertised as "Cadillac" and every new model thereafter was introduced as "The New Cadillac" with series or model changes only mentioned when the vehicle needed service.

Fleetwood Metal Body in Fleetwood, Pennsylvania began to supplement premium level coachwork in tandem with Fisher Body beginning in 1927. Standard and Custom body style choices were supplied by Fisher, while Brunn & Company offered four choices, and Willoughby Company offered a Town Cabriolet for US$4,800 ($88,966 in 2025 dollars). With the list of available customized coachwork choices continuing to expand, starting with fifty body style and types, five hundred color and upholstery combinations were available while utilizing a 132" wheelbase. 1927 was also the year the LaSalle Series 303 was introduced, allowing Cadillac to pursue ever increasing exclusivity of body style and luxurious appointments in competition with the Packard Eight and the Lincoln L series with their expanding list of coachbuilders.

The first displacement upgrade to the Cadillac V8 was introduced in 1928, the first change since the engine was introduced in 1915, and while the internal designation was now known as the Series 341-A, the car was advertised simply as "The New Cadillac" along with the introduction of LaSalle junior companion brand and was the first time there were more than one product line from Cadillac. GM had successfully purchased Fisher Body and Fleetwood Metal Body earlier in 1925, and provided the Cadillac customer 15 separate coachwork choices from Fisher on a 140" wheelbase, and a separate 25 individual choices from Fleetwood also on a 140" wheelbase. The most exclusive Fleetwood choice listed was the Touring Town Collapsible Cabriolet at US$6,200 ($116,250 in 2025 dollars) Ambulance and Hearse choices were on a 152" wheelbase provided by Superior. As before, visual, equipment and mechanical changes separated it from the previous year. A monogram plaque engraved with "V8" first appeared attached to a rod connecting the massive 12" headlights. Fleetwood bodies featured a "sweep panel" which was a styling flourish that started at the top of the hood next to the radiator and gradually progressed outward towards the cowl then down the sides of the engine covers. Sometimes this trim device was used to separate different complementing colors if desired. One of the documented distinctions between the Series 314 and Series 341 is the positioning of the starter; 314's had it installed vertically while 341's were horizontally positioned.

The 1929 Type 341-B continued the tradition of appearance, engineering and equipment available upgrades, introducing a synchromesh transmission, Security-Plate safety glass installed for all windows, and electrically powered windshield wipers. Fisher Body coachwork selections offered 12 choices, while Fleetwood offered 33 documented selections; the "sweep panel" introduced the previous year was now a standard feature on all Fleetwood products and some vehicles had two-tone paint appearances while others used a single color with the "sweep panel" used. The Cadillac hood ornament made its appearance as an extra cost option of US$12 ($222 in 2025 dollars)for the "Herald" ,"Heron" or "Goddess", while a heater for occupants was US$32 ($593 in 2025 dollars) and a rear folding trunk rack was US$25 ($463 in 2025 dollars).

September 1929 is when Cadillac introduced its all-new 1930 Series 353, one month before the Cadillac V-12 and the Wall Street crash of 1929. Luxury, optional equipment, interior and exterior choices and exclusivity had become expected of the order catalog for Cadillac products and the list was refined and expanded. All Fisher coachwork choices were now identified as "Fisher Custom" and reduced to seven closed bodies, while the more exclusive "Fleetwood Special Custom" choices were consolidated into 11 basic bodies with many variations. With the introduction of the wireless radio, all bodies were prewired for the optionally installed AM radio for US$175 ($3,373 in 2025 dollars) with the radio antenna concealed inside the roof. The Fleetwood catalog consisted of 37 distinct variations in an array of color and upholstery types, to include mohair, leather or any other choice desired with the most exclusive choice documented was the 4-door Collapsible Touring Limousine Brougham at US$5,945 ($110,188 in 2025 dollars). Model year sales were recorded at 14,995.

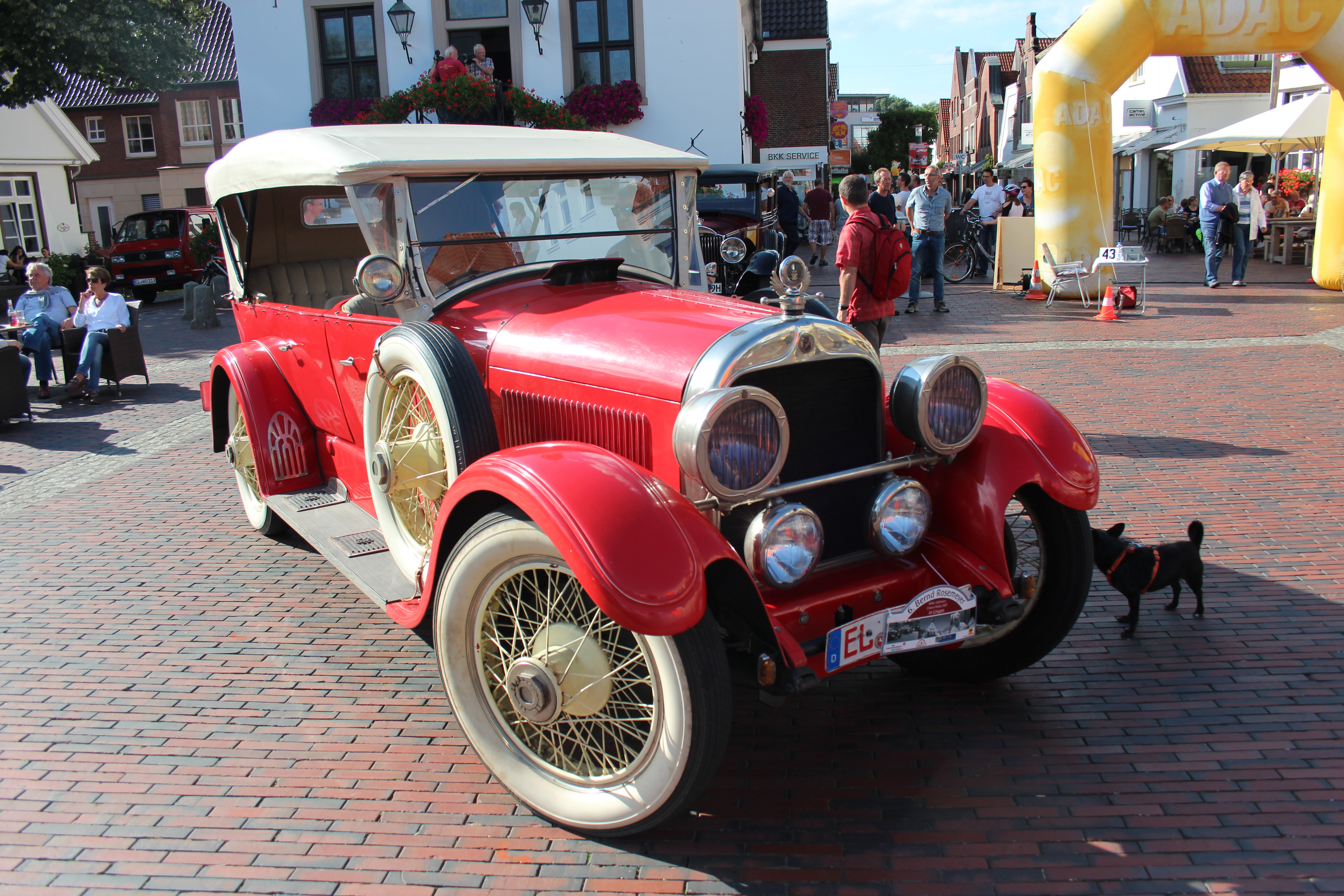
1924 Cadillac V-63 Standard Touring Sedan

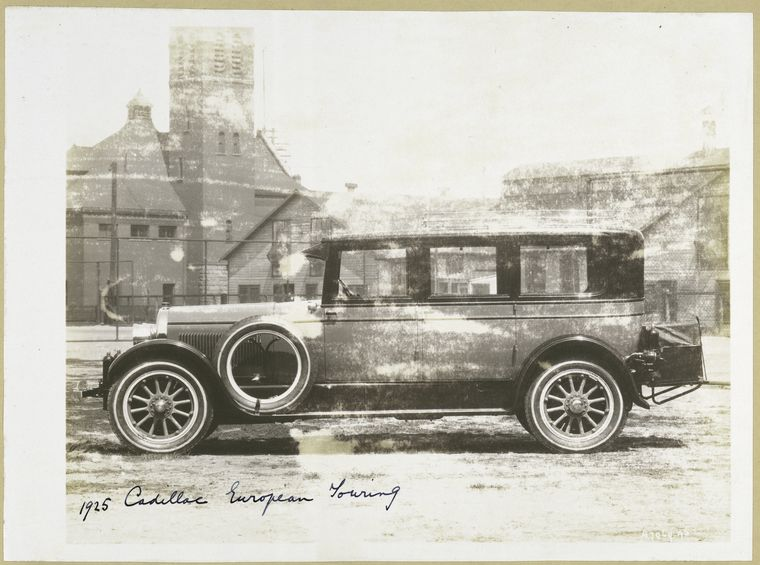
1925 Cadillac V-63 Custom Suburban Sedan

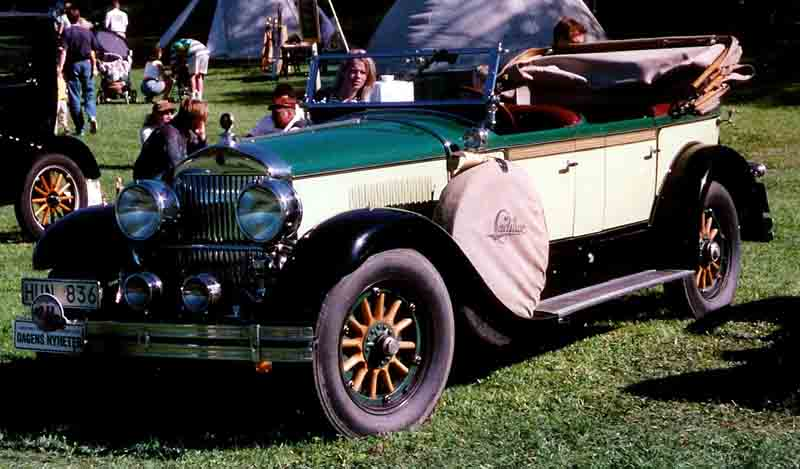
1926 Cadillac Series 314 Touring Sedan

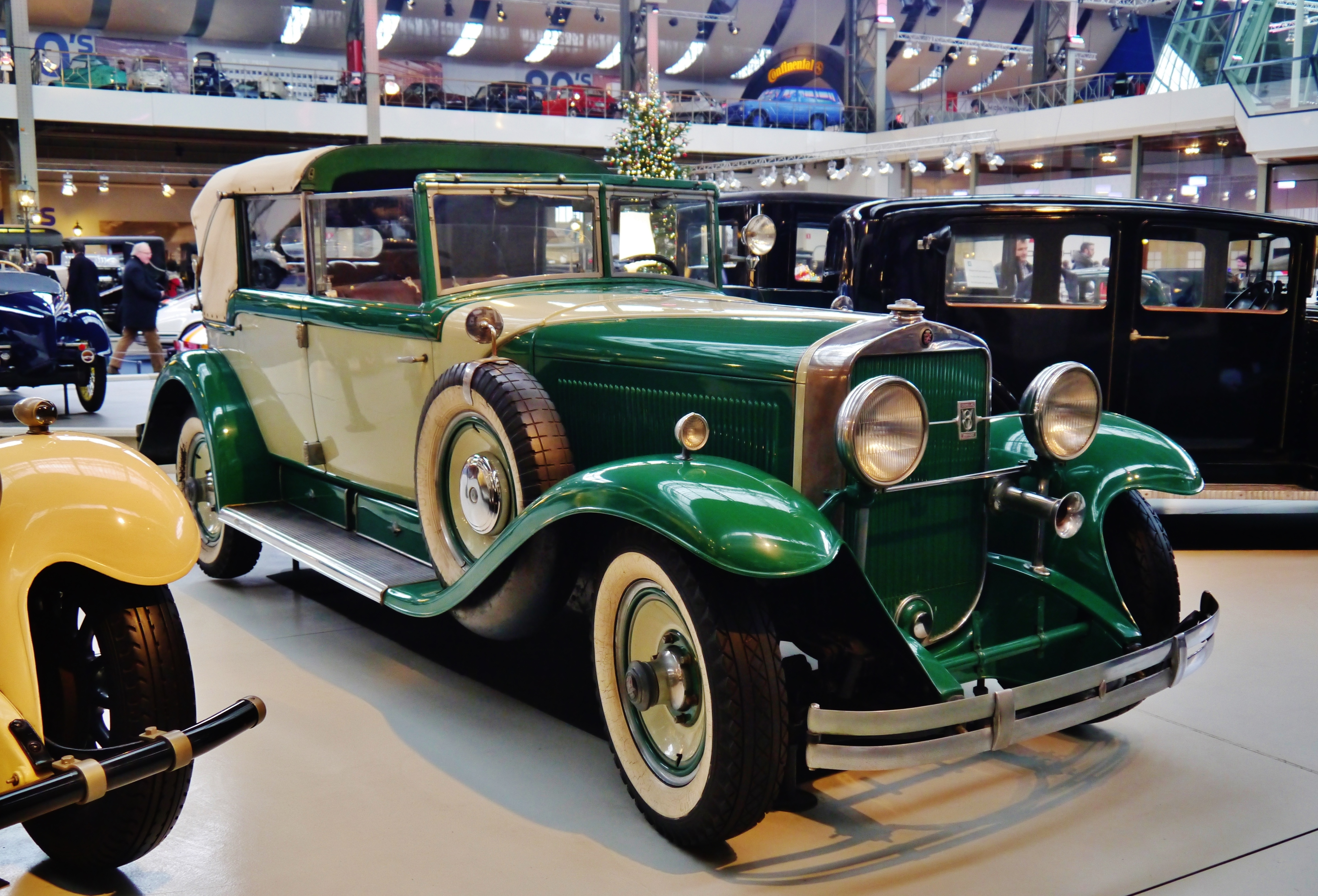
1928 Cadillac Series 341-A Town Cabriolet by Fleetwood

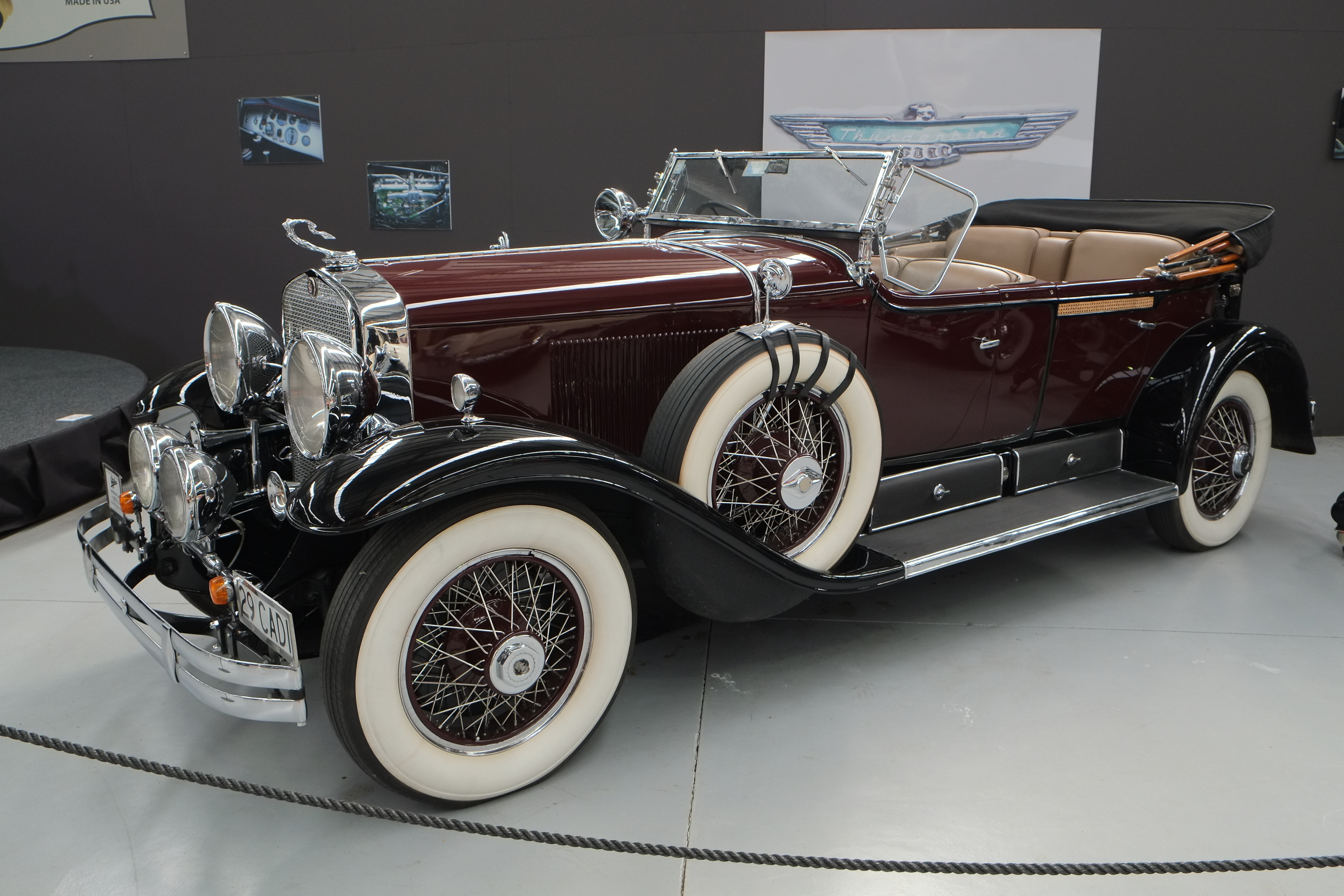
1929 Cadillac Series 341-B Sports Phaeton

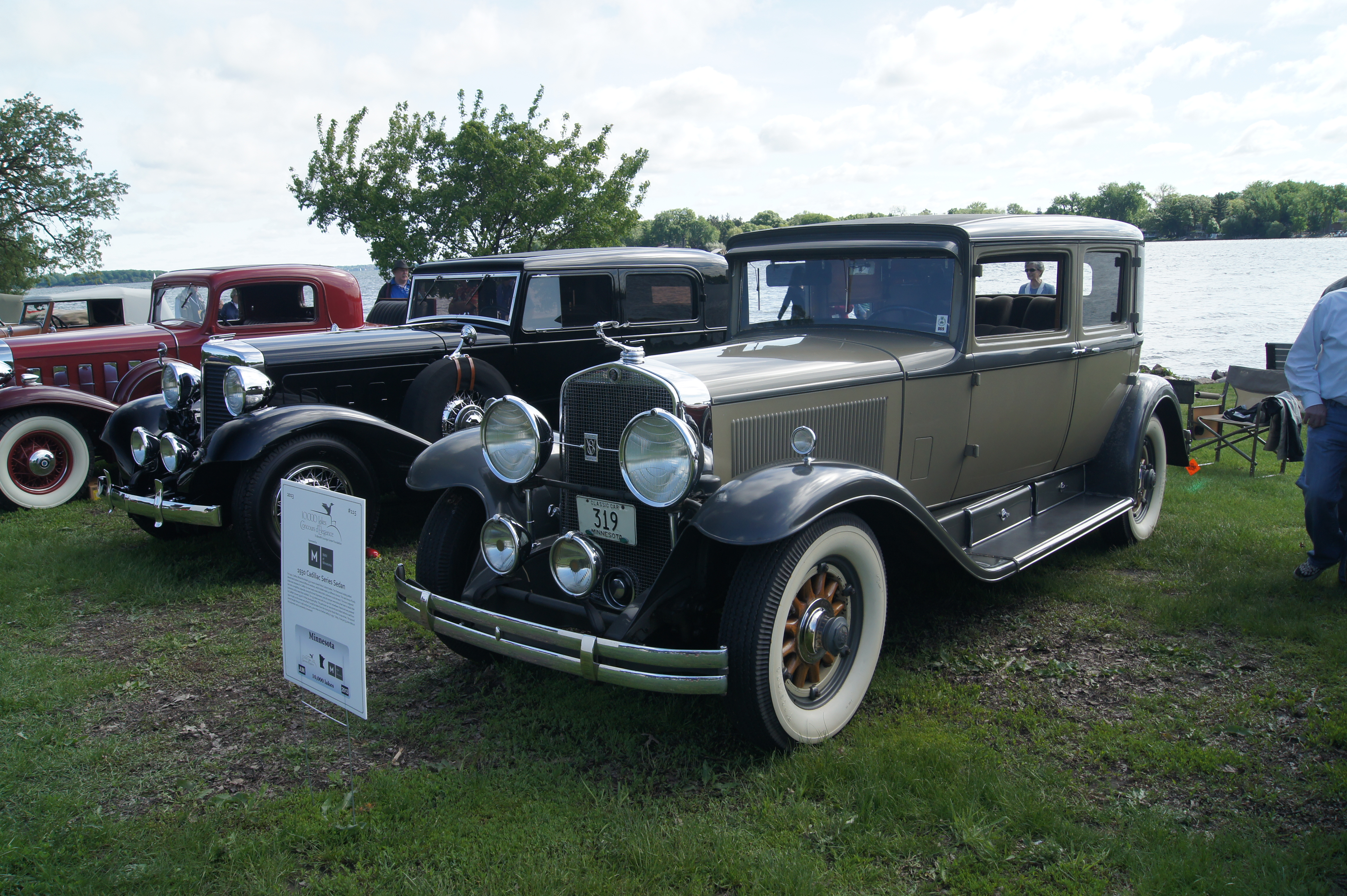
1930 Cadillac Series 353 Town Sedan

== See also ==
- LaSalle Series 303
- Buick Master Six
- Oldsmobile Model 30
- Oakland Six
- Chevrolet Superior

== Bibliography ==
- Matt, Susan (2003). Keeping Up With the Joneses. Philadelphia: University of Pennsylvania Press.
- (1923). "V-63 Cadillac Claimed Nearest to Perfection." The Washington Post.
