= Cadillac Series 70 =

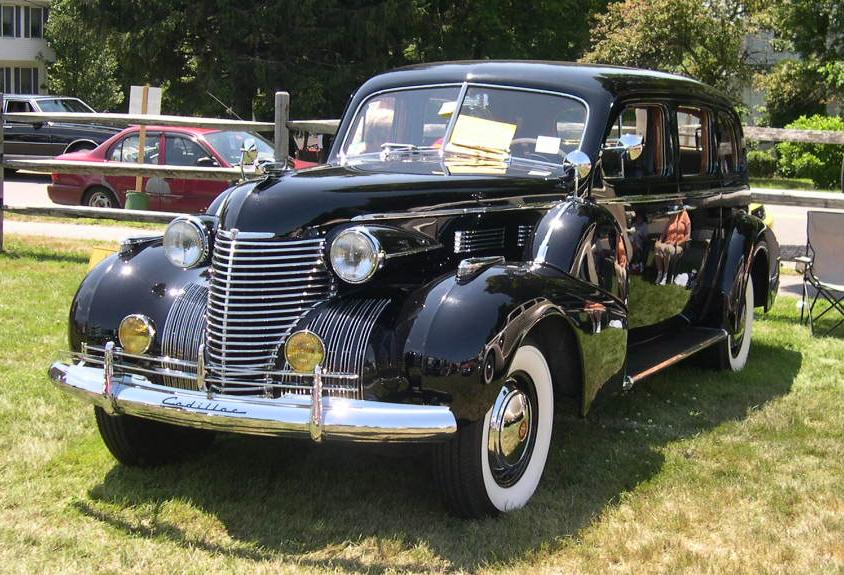
- 1940 Cadillac Series 75

Overview
- Manufacturer: Cadillac (General Motors); Hess & Eisenhardt
- Production: 1936–1942; 1946–1976; 1985–1987

Body and chassis
- Class: Full-size luxury car
- Layout: FR layout (1936–1984); FF layout (1985–1987)
- Platform: D body
- Related: Cadillac Commercial Chassis

Chronology
- Predecessor: Cadillac Series 355

The Cadillac Series 70 (models 70 and 75) is a full-size V8-powered series of cars that were produced by Cadillac from the 1930s to the 1980s. It replaced the 1935 355E as the company's mainstream car just as the much less expensive Series 60 was introduced. The Series 72 and 67 were similar to the Series 75 but the 72 and 67 were produced on a slightly shorter and longer wheelbase respectively. The Series 72 was only produced in 1940 and the Series 67 was only produced in 1941 and 1942. For much of the postwar era, it was the top-of-the-line Cadillac, and was Cadillac's factory-built limousine offering.

Production of the short wheelbase Series 70 ceased in 1938, but reappeared briefly as the relatively expensive Series 70 Eldorado Brougham four-door hardtop from 1957 to 1958, while the long wheelbase Series 75 made a final appearance in the 1987 model year.

== 1936–1937 ==
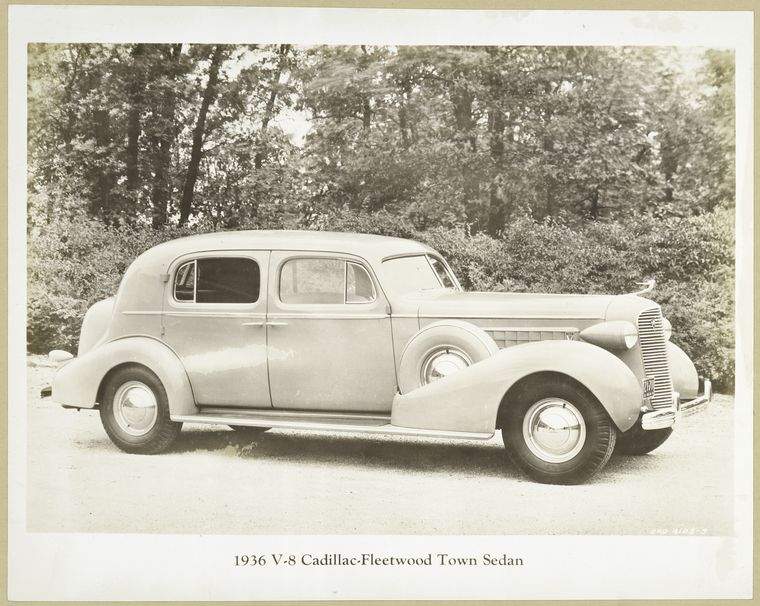
1936 Cadillac Series 70

First generation Series 70/75
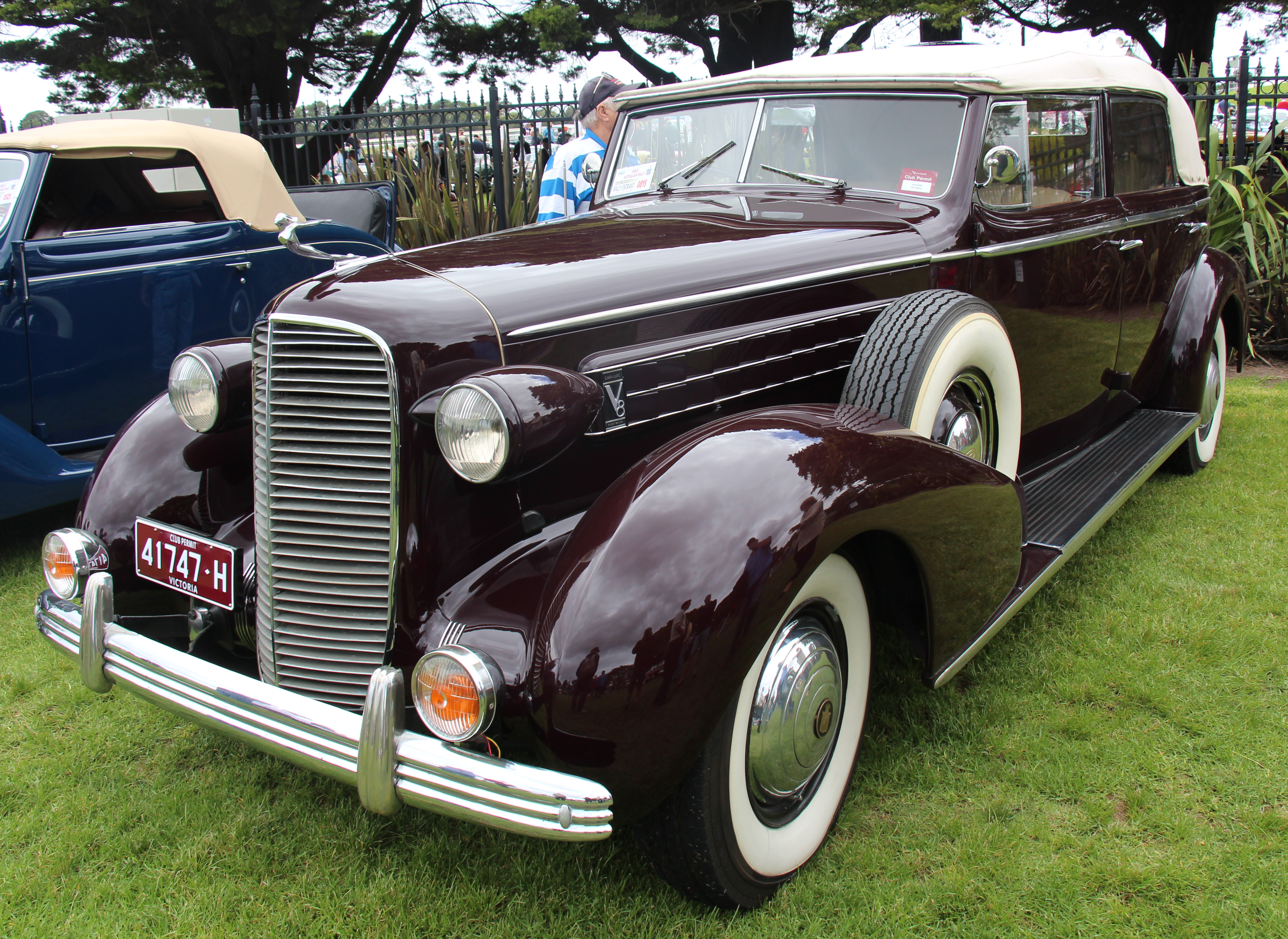
- 1936 Cadillac Series 70 four-door convertible

Overview
- Model years: 1936–1937
- Assembly: Detroit Assembly, Detroit, Michigan, U.S.
- Designer: Harley Earl

Body and chassis
- Body style: 2-door coupe 2-door convertible 4-door sedan 4-door convertible 4-door town car 4-door limousine
- Layout: FR layout
- Platform: Series 70: C-body; Series 75: D-body
- Related: Series 70: Cadillac Series 80; Cadillac Series 65; Buick Roadmaster Series 75: Cadillac Series 90; Cadillac Series 85; Buick Limited

Powertrain
- Engine: 346 cu in (5.7 L) Monobloc V8
- Transmission: 3-speed synchromesh manual

Dimensions
- Wheelbase: Series 70: 131.0 in (3,327 mm); Series 75: 138.0 in (3,505 mm); Commercial:156.0 in (3,962 mm)
- Length: Series 70: 1936: 206.3 in (5,240 mm); 1937: 208.4 in (5,293 mm); Series 75: 1936: 213.5 in (5,423 mm); 1937: 215.9 in (5,484 mm); Commercial: 231.3 in (5,875 mm)
- Width: 74.4 in (1,890 mm)
- Height: Series 70: 69.5 in (1,765 mm); Series 75: 68.8 in (1,748 mm)
- Curb weight: 4,500–5,300 lb (2,000–2,400 kg)

The 1936 Series 70 and 75 both had V-shaped windshield styles by Fleetwood. A narrower radiator shell was supported by the new louver style "Convex vee" grille. Headlights were mounted on the radiator shell. Parking lights were inside the headlights. Front fenders were new with a crease along the center line. The cowl vent was changed back to opening forward. There were built-in trunks on "touring" styles, town cars and four-door convertibles. Coupes and two-door convertibles had rumble seats plus a separate door for the spare tire at the extreme rear of the deck. All bodies now featured the Fisher Turret Top.

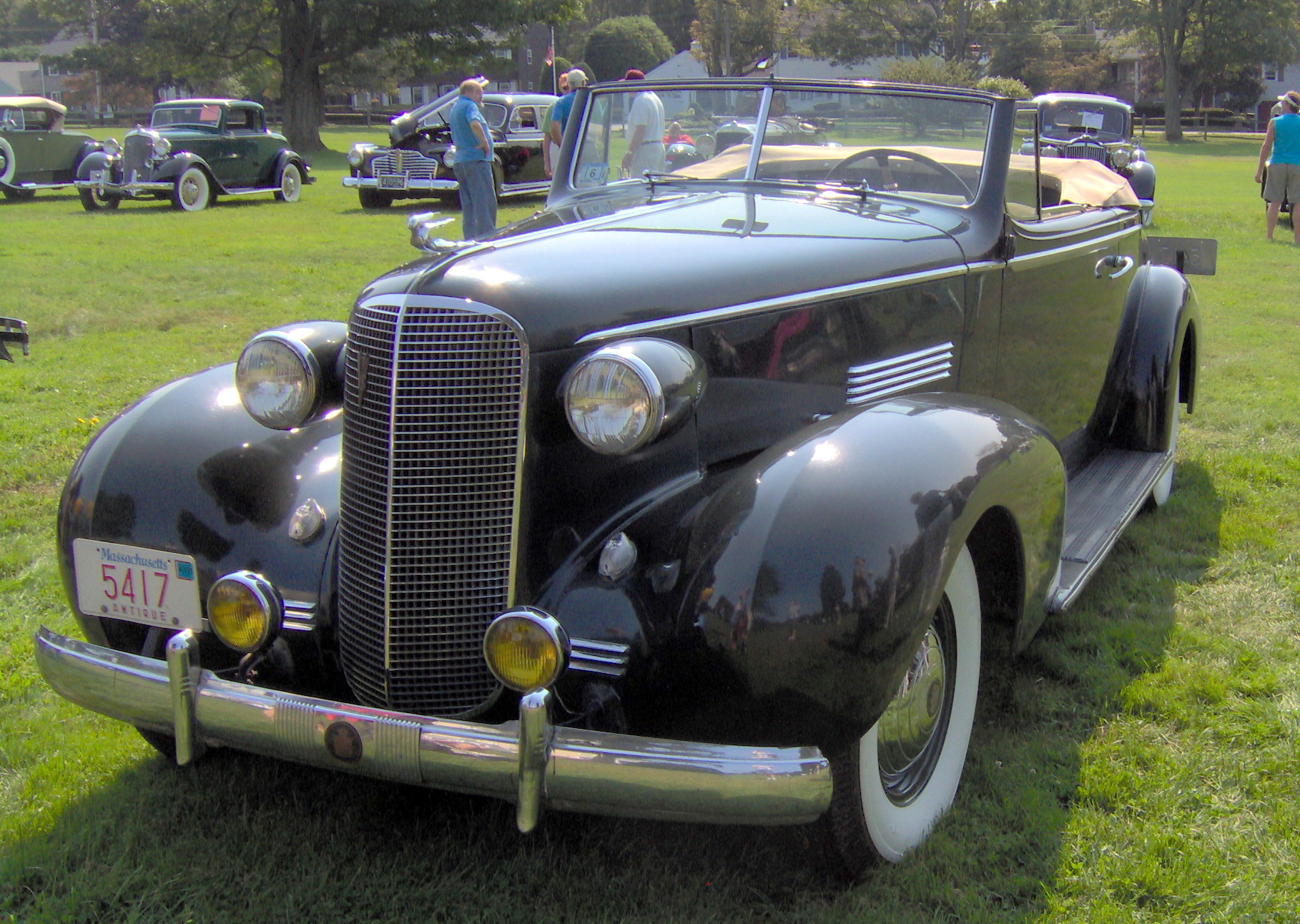
1937 Cadillac Series 70 two-door convertible

The Series 70 and 75 were powered by the new 346 cu in (5.7 L) Monobloc V8, This 135 hp (101 kW) engine was both less expensive and more powerful, and the stylish body by Fleetwood should have made the Series 70 and 75 an instant hit. However, the high price (US$2,445 and up ($56,728 in 2025 dollars)) limited their appeal in the Great Depression era. Only 5,248 were sold for 1936.

In 1937 bodies were the same except for drip moldings running from the bottom of the front pillar up and over the doors and rear quarter window, new fenders and bumpers, headlights rigidly attached (adjusted by moving reflector), wheel discs incorporated a hubcap, and a built-in trunk was incorporated on most bodies. A die-cast eggcrate grille was used, but the hood louver treatment differed from that used in Fisher bodied cars. Chrome die cast strips were used at the rear of the hood side panels. A seven-passenger Fisher-bodied Special touring sedan, without a division window was offered on the 138.0 in (3,505 mm) wheelbase. These two body styles had the eggcrate hood louvers typical of all Fisher bodied Cadillacs for 1937. The Business car line included eight-passenger versions of these Special sedans plus eight-passenger versions of Fleetwood body styles. The eighth passenger was seated with two others on auxiliary seats. A commercial chassis on a 156.0 in (3,962 mm) wheelbase was offered. Engine changes included a lighter flywheel, a generator relocated in the vee, an oil filter, a new carburetor with full automatic electric choke, an oil bath cleaner, and a relocated distributor. A new transmission design featured pin-type synchronizers, shifter rails relocated to the side of the case, a cover on the bottom of the case, and an extension integral with the transmission mainshaft. Sales totaled 4,332.

== 1938–1940 ==
Second generation Series 72/75
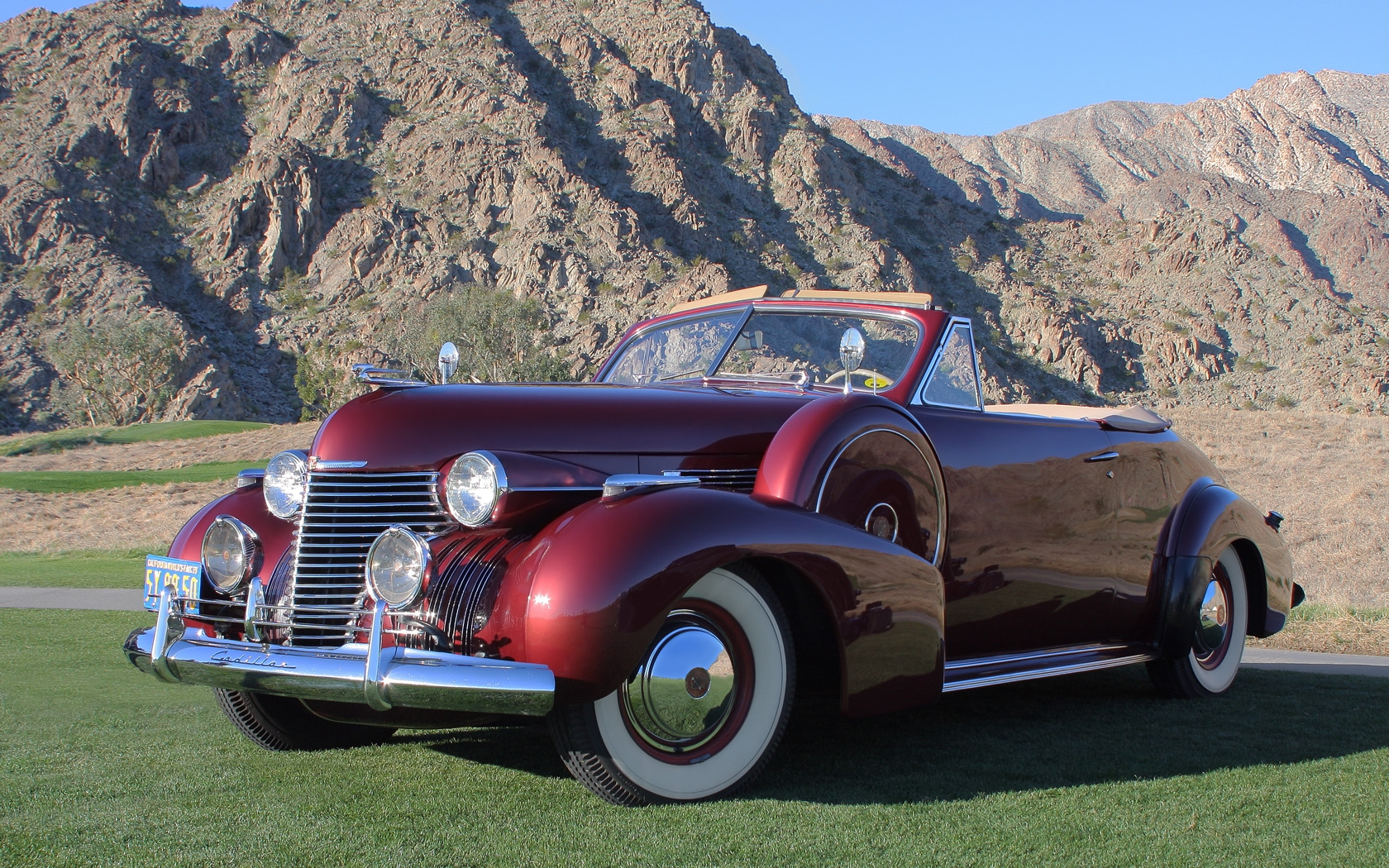
- 1940 Cadillac Series 75 two-door convertible

Overview
- Model years: 1938–1940
- Assembly: Detroit Assembly, Detroit, Michigan, U.S.
- Designer: Harley Earl

Body and chassis
- Body style: 2-door coupe 2-door convertible 4-door sedan 4-door convertible 4-door town car 4-door limousine
- Layout: FR layout
- Platform: D-body
- Related: Cadillac Series 90; Buick Limited

Powertrain
- Engine: 346 cu in (5.7 L) Monobloc V8
- Transmission: 3-speed synchromesh manual 4-speed Hydramatic automatic

Dimensions
- Wheelbase: Series 72: 138.0 in (3,505 mm); Series 75: 141.0 in (3,581 mm); Series 72 Commercial: 165.3 in (4,199 mm); Series 75 Commercial: 1938: 161.0 in (4,089 mm); 1939: 161.4 in (4,100 mm); 1940: 165.0 in (4,191 mm)
- Length: Series 72: 226.7 in (5,758 mm); Series 75: 1938: 220.6 in (5,603 mm); 1939: 225.1 in (5,718 mm); 1940: 228.2 in (5,796 mm); Series 72 Commercial: 253.8 in (6,447 mm); Series 75 Commercial: 1939: 245.4 in (6,233 mm); 1940: 248.7 in (6,317 mm)
- Width: 77.6 in (1,971 mm)
- Curb weight: 4,800–5,400 lb (2,200–2,400 kg)

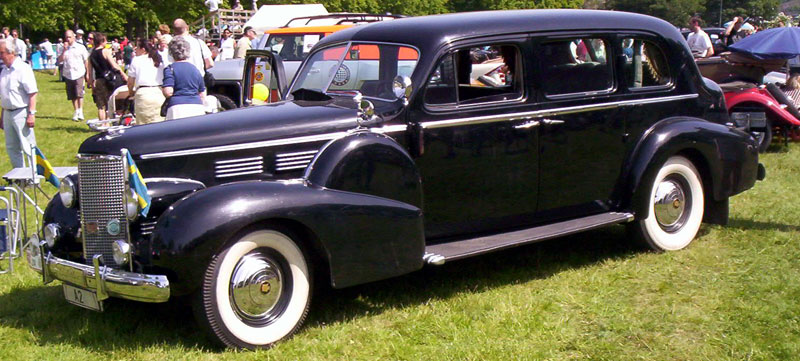
1938 Series 70 Imperial Touring Limousine

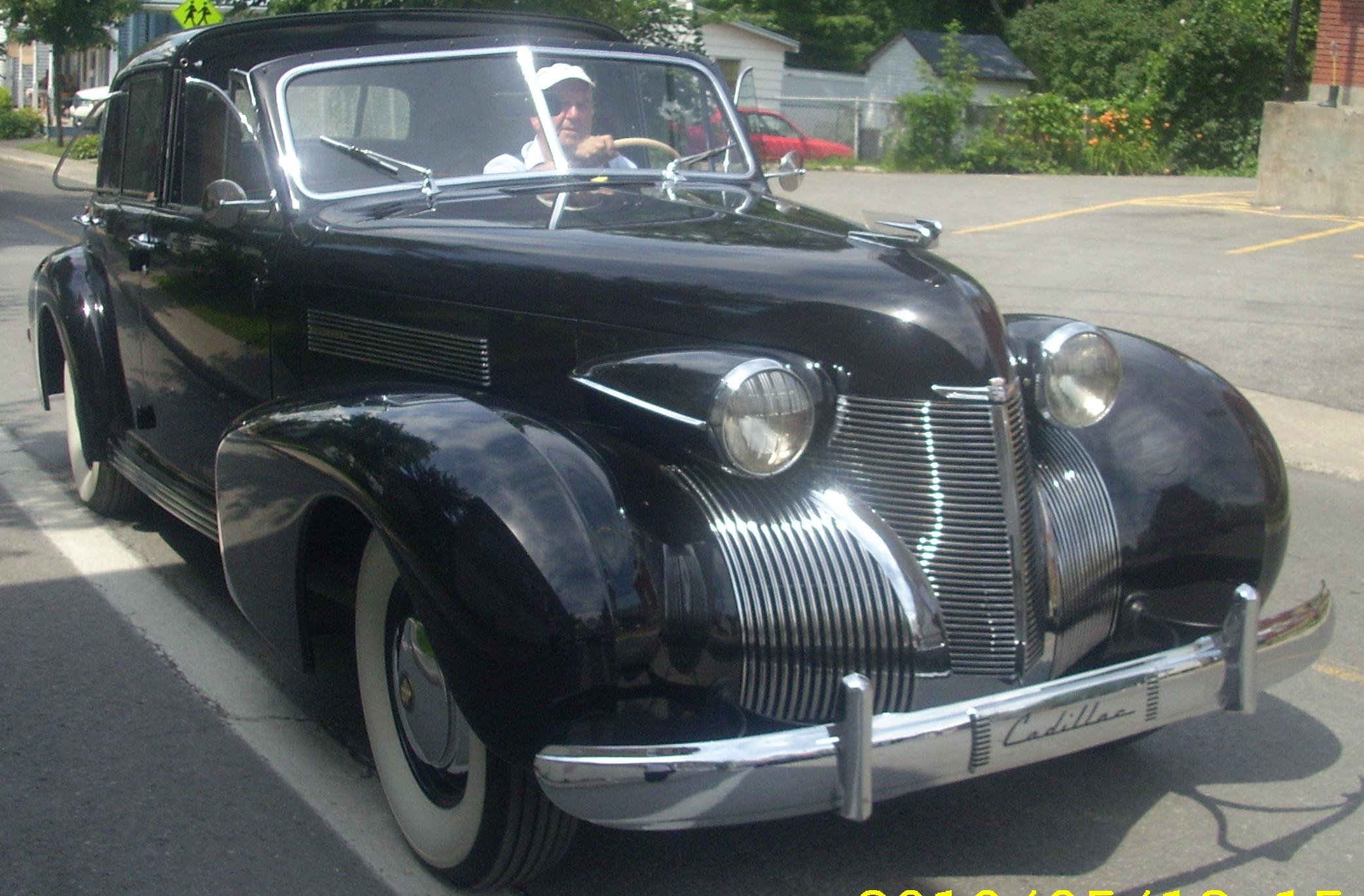
1939 Cadillac Series 75 town car

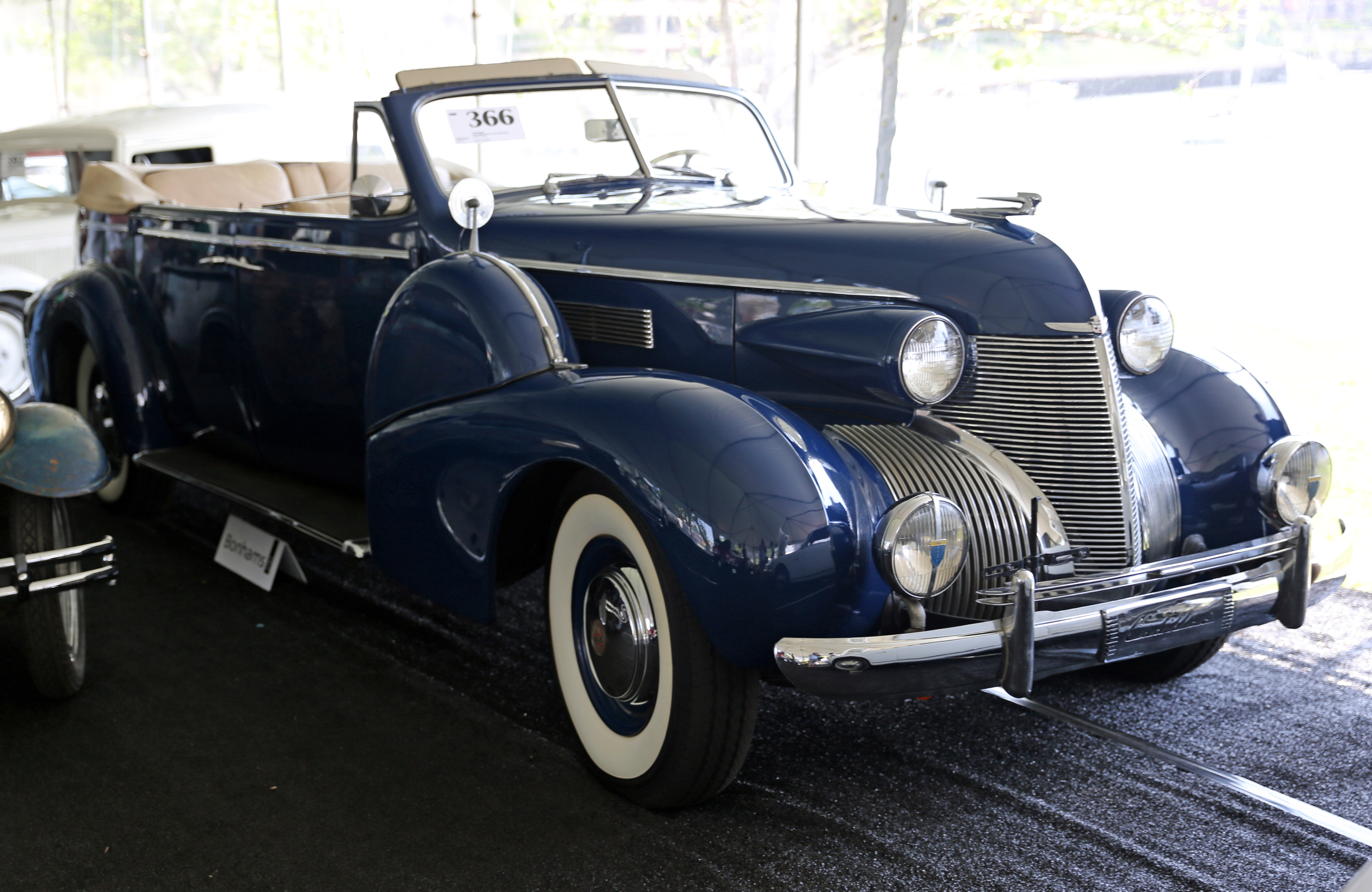
1939 Cadillac Series 75 four-door convertible

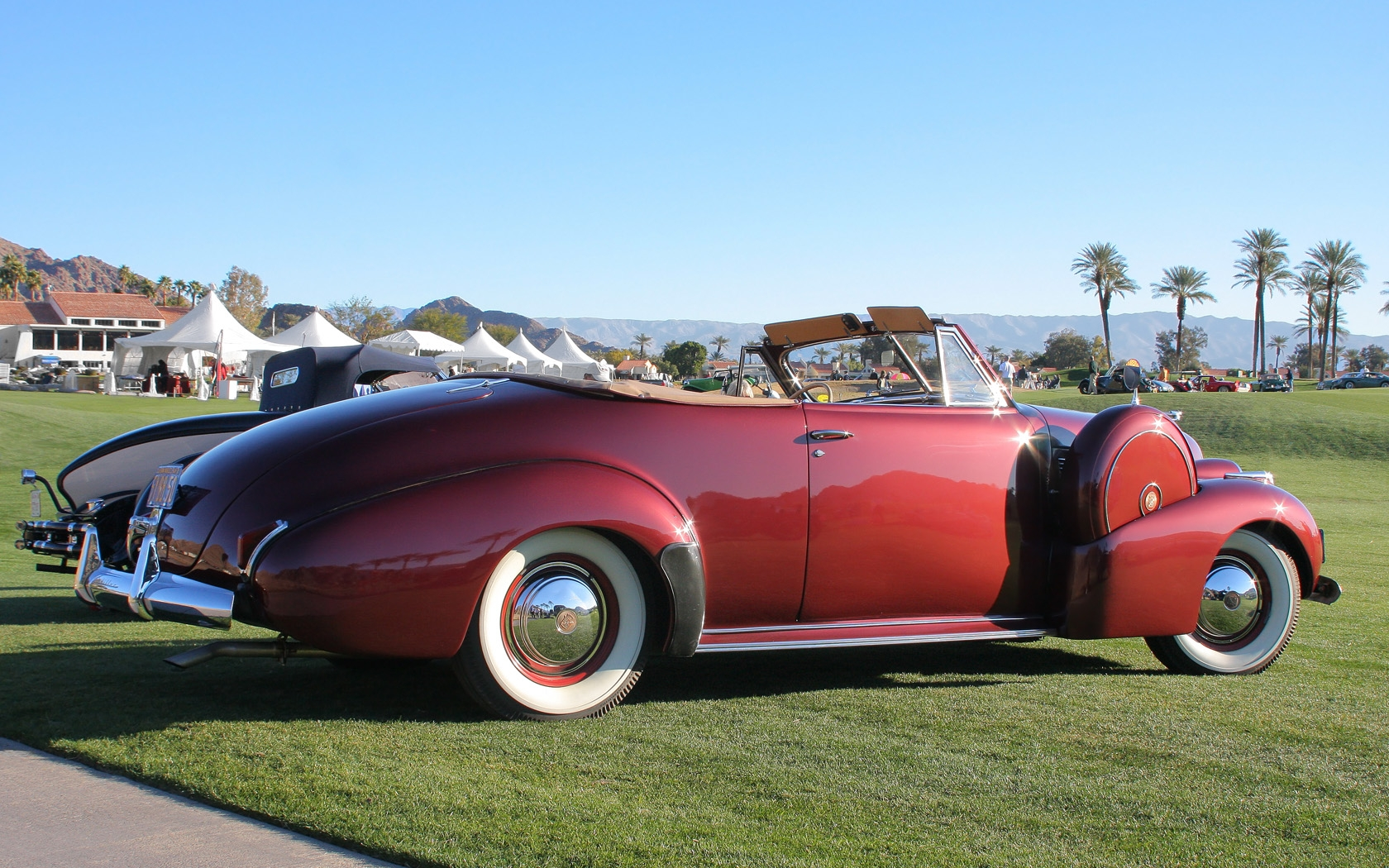
1940 Cadillac Series 75 two-door convertible rear

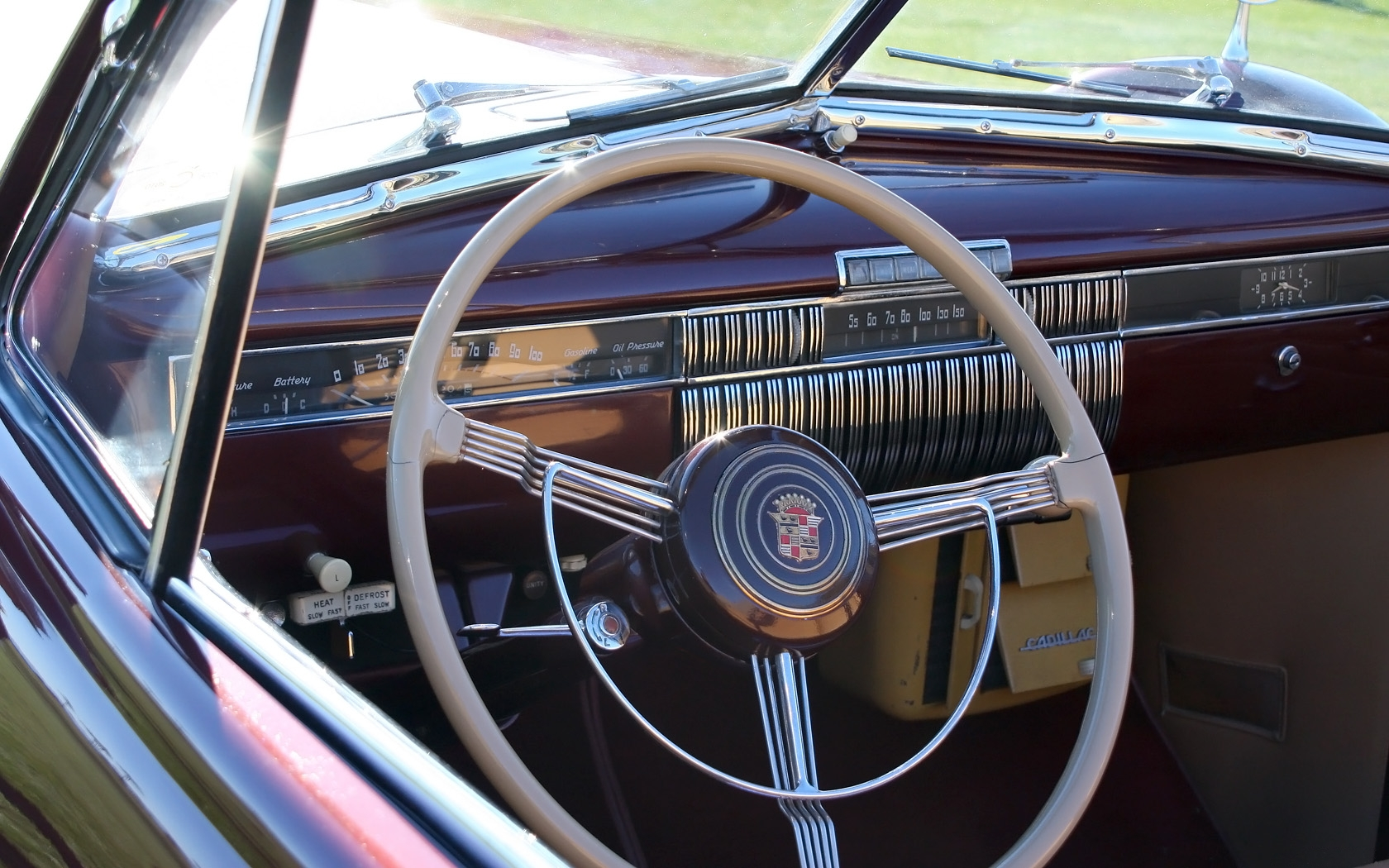
1940 Cadillac Series 75 two-door convertible interior

For 1938 the Series 70 and Fisher-bodied Series 75 Specials were dropped. The Series 75 used a 141 in (3,600 mm) wheelbase and now only offered bodies by Fleetwood.

In 1938 the Cadillac Series 65 and the Series 75 shared a new front end style featuring a massive vertical cellular grille, three sets of horizontal bars on the hood sides, alligator hood, and headlights on the filler space between the fenders and the hood. Optional sidemount covers were hinged to the fenders. Quarter windows were of sliding rather than hinged construction. The rear of the body had rounder corners and more smoothly blended lines. Trunks had more of an appearance of being an integral part of the body. Bodies were all steel except for wooden main sills. New chassis details included a column gear shift, horns just behind the grille, battery under the right hand side of the hood, transverse muffler just behind the fuel tank, wheels by a different manufacturer, "Synchro-Flex" flywheel, hypoid rear axle and the deletion of the oil filter. All Cadillacs shared the same 346 in^{3} L-head V8, although the 75 generated 140 hp (104 kW) instead of 135 hp (101 kW) like the rest of the line thanks to a higher 6.70:1 compression ratio, necessitating the use of higher octane fuel.

For 1939, all Cadillac V8s had new grille styling; similar in appearance but different in detail dimensions on each series. The pointed center grille and the functional side grilles were die-cast, with fine pitch bars. A single die-cast louver was positioned to the rear of each hood side panel. Headlights were once again attached to the radiator casing. Chassis changes included: tube and fin radiator core; sea shell horns under the hood; 10mm spark plugs.

In 1940 the one year only Series 72 was introduced as a less expensive companion to the Series 75. 1940 was the final year for the optional side mounts. Sealed beam headlights were standard equipment. The engine manifold was set at five degrees to the engine to cancel the rearward tilt of the engine and give balanced distribution.

=== Series 72 ===
The Series 72 had the same general appearance as the Series 75 but it was three inches shorter and set apart by rectangular taillights set high on the sides of the trunk. Recirculating ball steering was tried on Series 72 in 1940, to be adopted on all series in 1941. Like the Series 75 it was Fleetwood bodied, but rode on a 138 in (3,500 mm) wheelbase.

== 1941–1942, 1946–1949 ==
Third generation Series 67/75
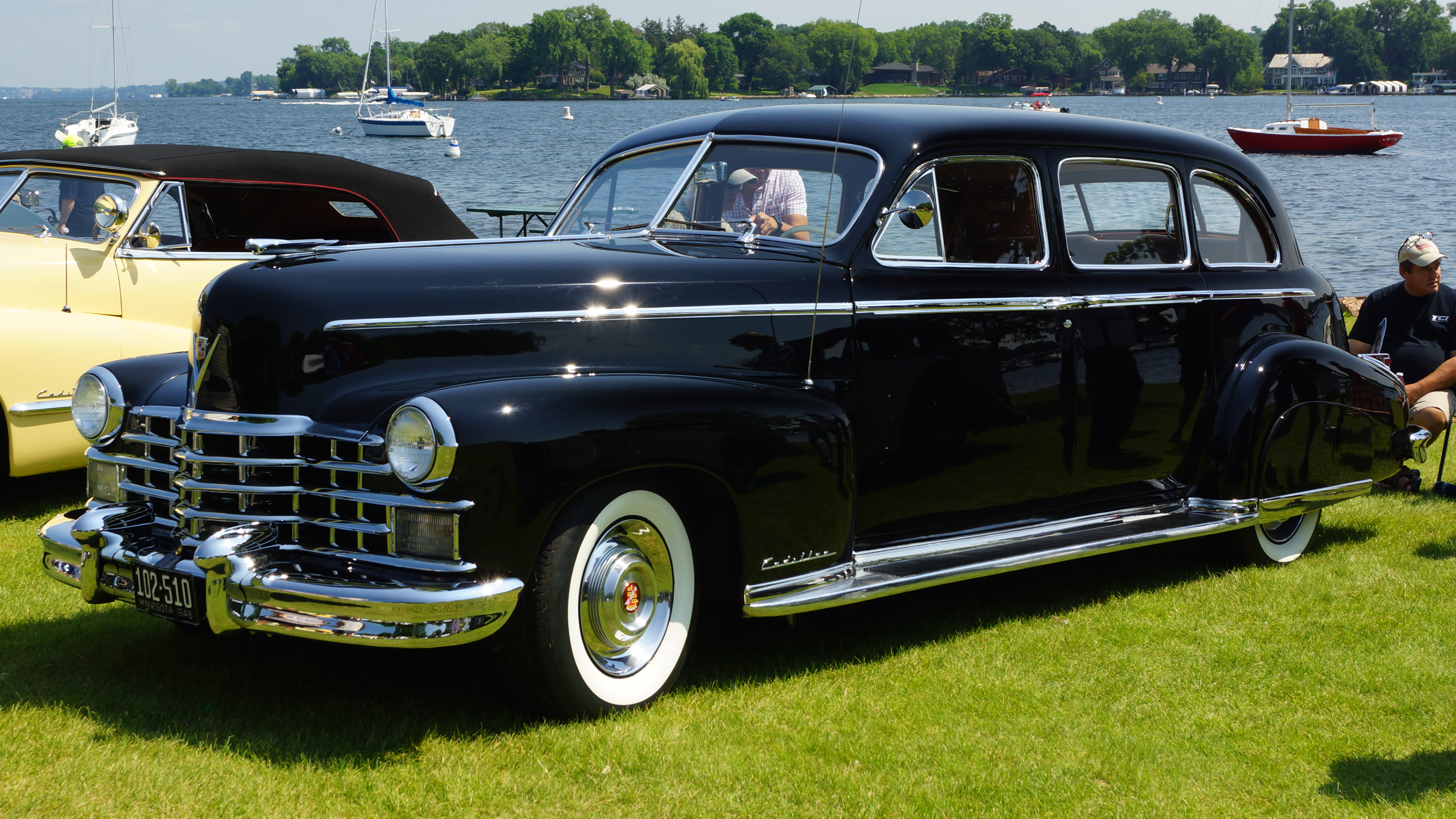
- 1948 Cadillac Series 75

Overview
- Model years: 1941–1942, 1946–1949
- Assembly: Detroit Assembly, Detroit, Michigan, U.S.
- Designer: Harley Earl

Body and chassis
- Body style: 4-door sedan 4-door limousine
- Layout: FR layout
- Platform: D-body
- Related: Buick Limited

Powertrain
- Engine: 346 cu in (5.7 L) Monobloc V8; 331 cu in (5.4 L) OHV V8
- Transmission: 3-speed synchromesh manual 4-speed Hydramatic automatic

Dimensions
- Wheelbase: Series 67: 139.0 in (3,531 mm); Series 75: 136.0 in (3,454 mm); Commercial: 163.0 in (4,140 mm)
- Length: Series 67: 228.0 in (5,791 mm); Series 75: 1941: 226.1 in (5,743 mm); 1942–1949: 227.0 in (5,766 mm); Commercial: 1941: 252.9 in (6,424 mm); 1941: 253.0 in (6,426 mm)
- Width: 82.6 in (2,098 mm)
- Height: 1946: 68.5 in (1,740 mm); 1947: 72.0 in (1,829 mm); 1948: 71.8 in (1,824 mm)
- Curb weight: 4,700–5,200 lb (2,100–2,400 kg)

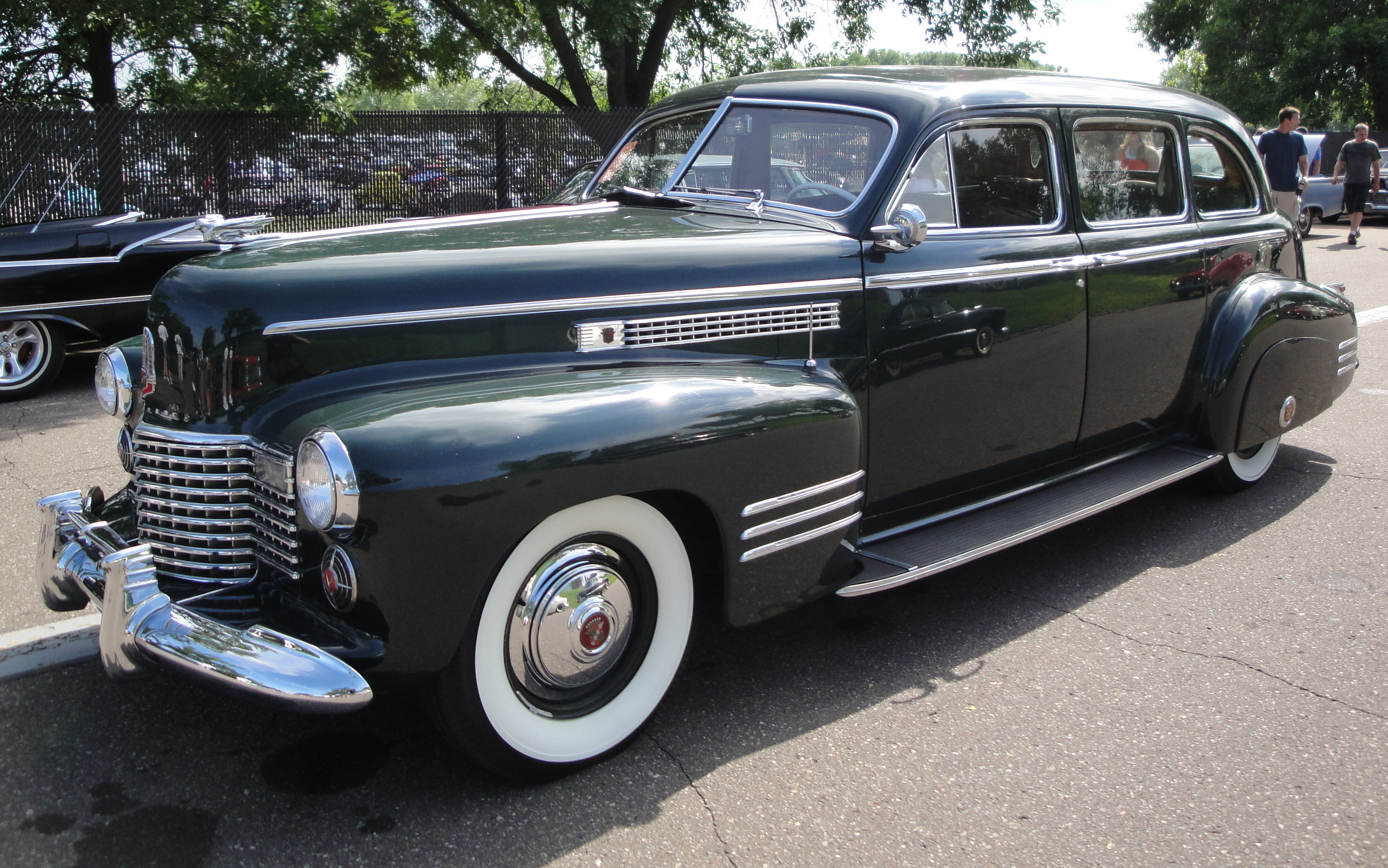
1941 Cadillac Series 75 limousine

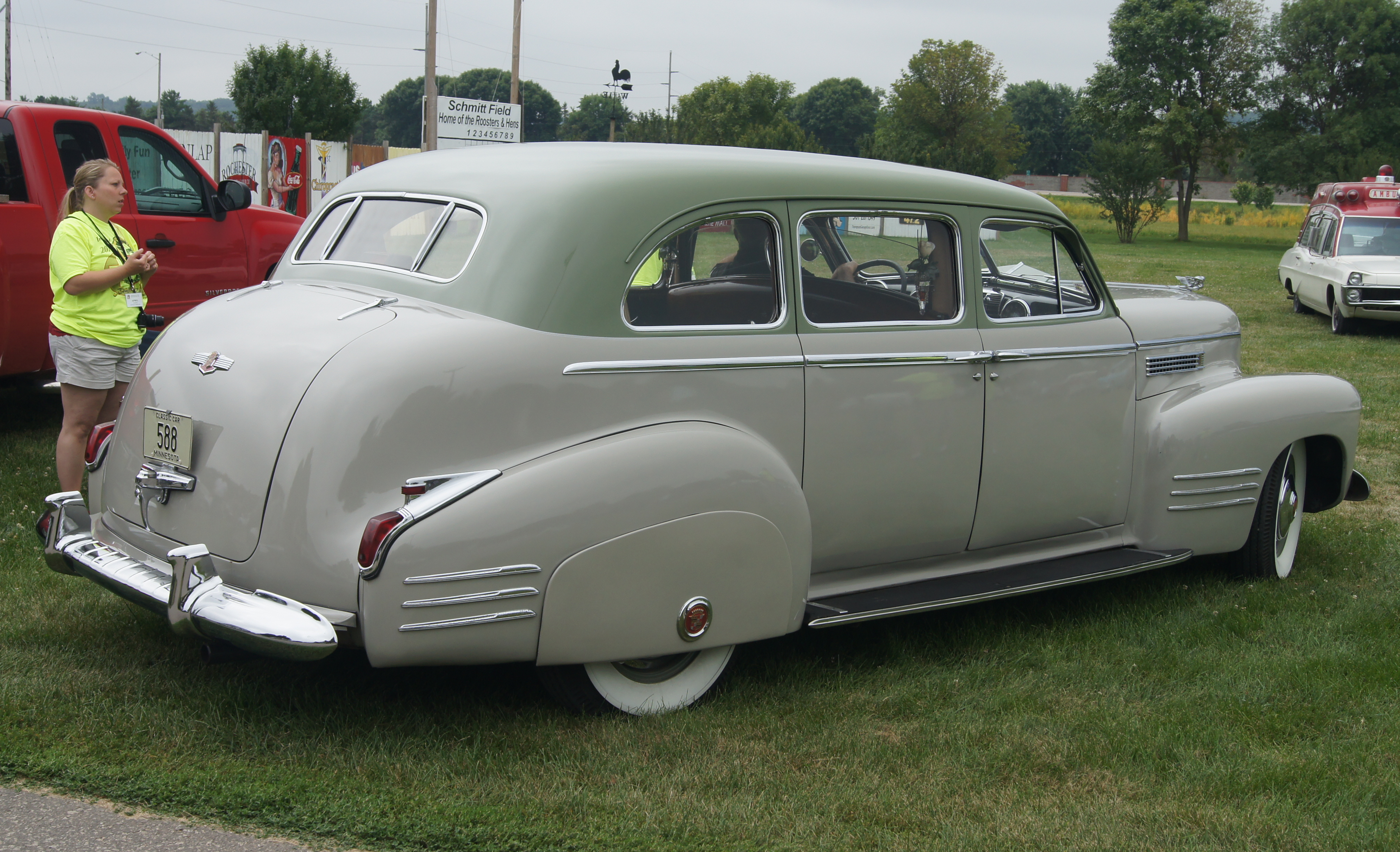
1941 Cadillac Series 75 limousine

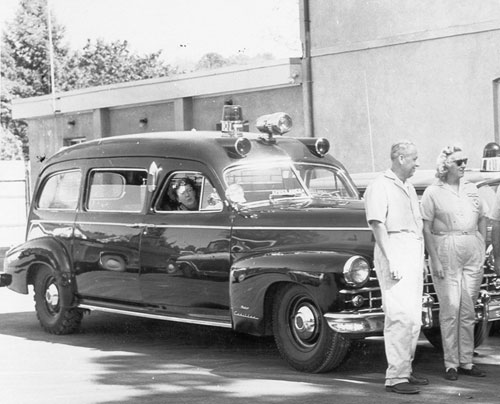
1948 Cadillac Series 75 ambulance

For 1941, the wheelbase was reduced to 136 in (3,454 mm), though power on the 346 cu in (5.7 L) L-head V8 engine was up to 150 hp (112 kW). The one piece hood came down lower in the front, included the side panels and extended sideways to the fenders. A single rectangular panel of louver trim was used on each side of the hood. The rectangular grille was wide, vertical, and bulged forward in the middle. Rectangular parking lights were built into the top outer corners of the grille. Headlights were now built into the nose of the fenders, and provision for built in accessory fog lights was provided under the headlights. Three chrome spears appeared on the rear section of all four fenders. Rear fender skirts were standard. Unlike other Cadillacs the Series 75 could only be ordered with running boards. It was with this generation that all GM vehicles experienced increased width dimensions to accommodate three passengers on the front bench seat and an additional three passengers on rear bench seat installed vehicles. This was accomplished with the deletion of running board thereby adding additional room inside the passenger compartment.

In 1941, the Series 67 was introduced using Fisher Body coachwork on a 139 in (3,531 mm) wheelbase and an overall length of 228 in (5,791 mm), and offered the Touring Sedan seating either five or seven passengers, and continued until 1942 with a listed price of US$2,890 ($56,947 in 2025 dollars). A passenger compartment divider was optional for US1,500 ($29,557 in 2025 dollars). The Series 67 was longer than the Fleetwood bodied Series 75 using a 136.5 in (3,467 mm) wheelbase, and a listed price of US$4,045 ($88,542 in 2025 dollars).

The grille became more massive in 1942, with even fewer bars and was the beginning of the traditional "egg crate" appearance that all future products adopted. Parking lights became round and fog light sockets became rectangular and were included in the grille area. A bullet shape appeared on the tops of the bumper guards. The nose on the hood louvers were more rounded. Unlike other Cadillacs the fender treatment remained unchanged. A new fresh air ventilating system with air ducts leading from the grille replaced cowl ventilators. Handbrake control was changed from lever to tee-shaped pull handle. Radiator shutter control of engine temperature was replaced by a blocking type thermostat in the water return fitting in the radiator. Prices listed for the top level Series 75 seven-passenger Formal Sedan were listed at US$4,484 ($88,356 in 2025 dollars) while the Business Imperial nine-passenger was listed at US$3,306 ($65,144 in 2025 dollars).

The Series 75 returned after the war as Cadillac's largest model. It retained most of its pre-war styling and rode on the long 136 in (3,500 mm) wheelbase and used a distinctive body not shared with other general Motors divisions. Five different touring sedan configurations were featured: with quarter windows; with auxiliary jump seats; business; Imperial seven-passenger and Imperial nine-passenger (the latter two both having jump seats). The engine was the same 346 in^{3} L-head V8 used by other Cadillacs that year. Standard equipment included large wheel discs, fender skirts, hood, side and lower beltline moldings and stainless steel running boards.

Unchanged in all but minor details for 1947, the big Series 75 continued to use the touring sedan body with a stately prewar appearance. It came in the same five configurations marketed the year before and had the same assortment of standard equipment geared to the luxury class buyer.

Consideration was given to the deletion of the long wheelbase line in 1948, but competitive pressure from Packard in the luxury class market dictated the retention of the Series 75. Again they featured General Motors old-fashioned "Turret Top" styling, a throwback to the prewar years. Minor revisions on the outside of the cars included a new background for the V-shaped hood emblem and Cadillac script, replacing block lettering, low on the fenders behind the front wheel opening. Buyers ordering fog lamps got rectangular lamps in place of the smaller round style. Stainless steel running boards were seen once again. A new dashboard with rainbow style instrument cluster and burled leather trim extending to the carpets was seen this year.

To accommodate luxury-class buyers the long wheelbase Series 75 was carried over in 1949 without any basic changes except that a more conventional dashboard design appeared featuring a horizontal speedometer. The new Cadillac OHV V8 was the big news for 1949. This 331 cu in (5.4 L) engine produced 160 hp (119 kW).

=== Series 67 ===
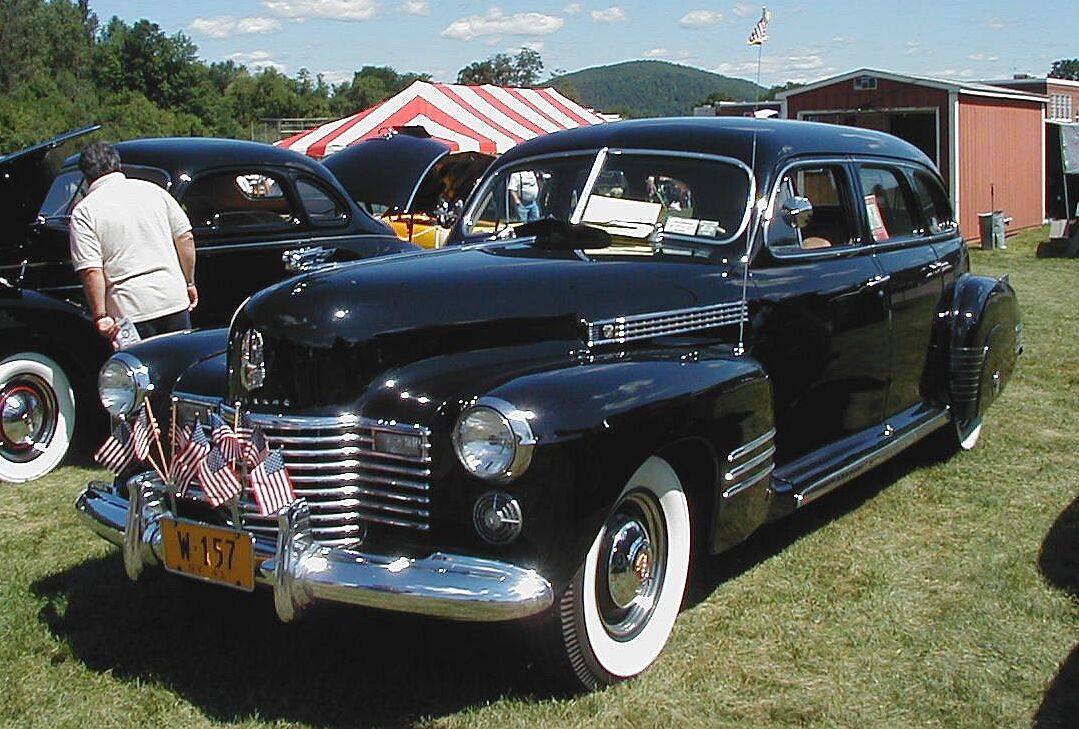
1941 Cadillac Series 67

The Series 67 of 1941–42 was somewhat longer than the 75. It was a Fisher bodied car, but rode on a 139.0 in (3,530 mm) wheelbase.

The series 67 used standard sheetmetal, that was similar and in most cases interchangeable with lower 61 and 62 series. It had a more streamlined appearance than the taller, more formal series 75, which had a higher cowl and hoodline.

== 1950–1953 ==
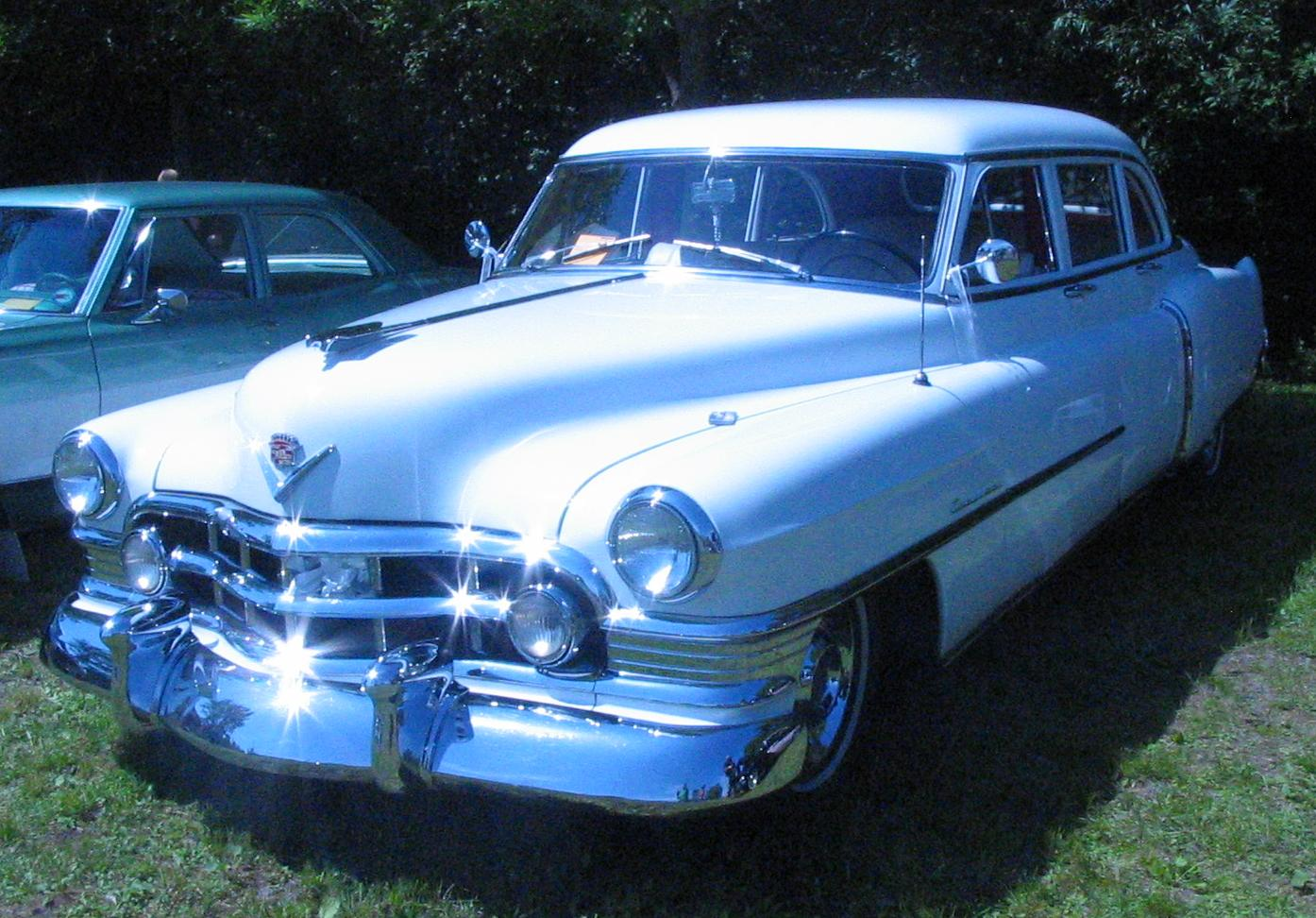
1950 Cadillac Series 75

Series 75
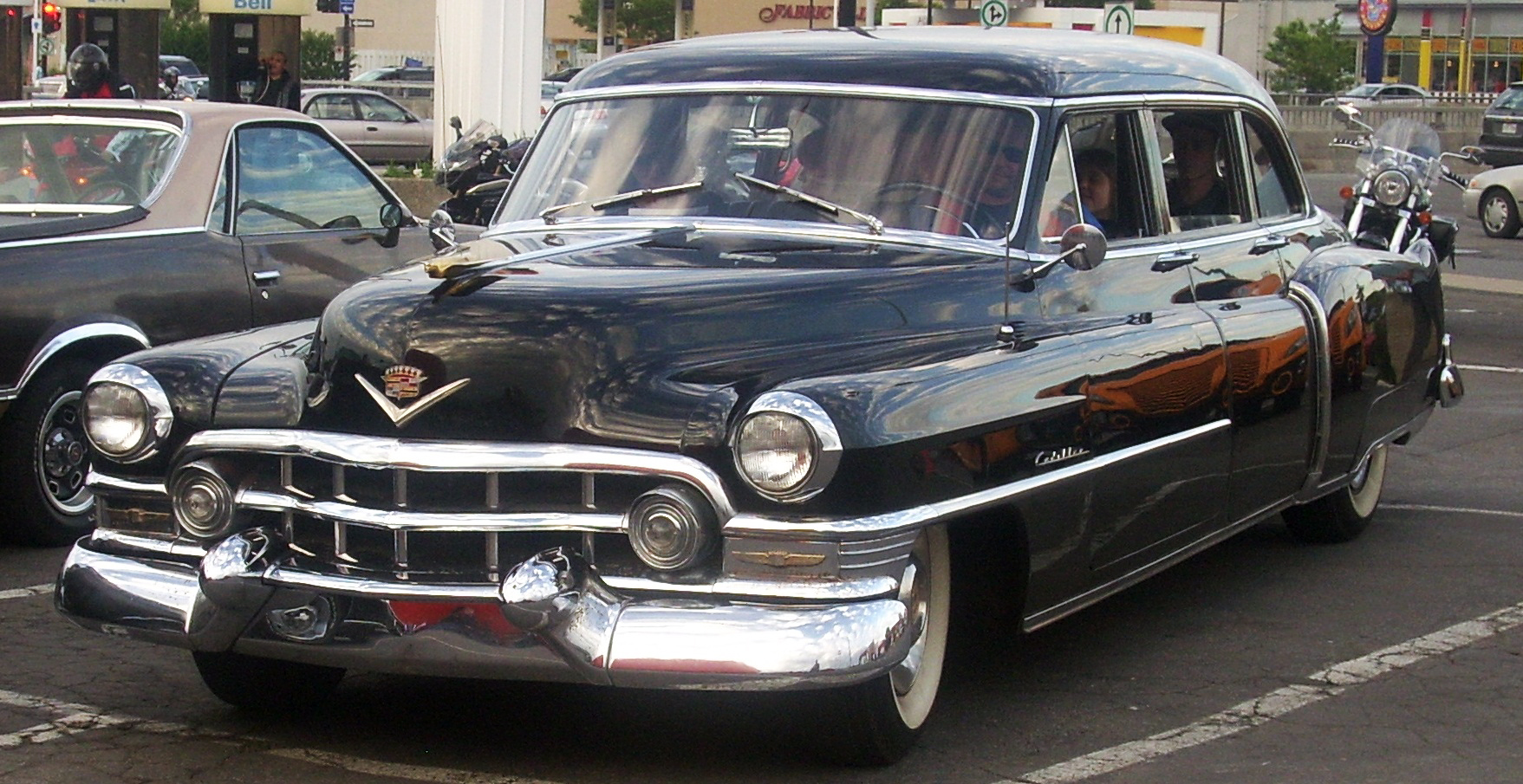
- 1950 Cadillac Fleetwood Series 75

Overview
- Model years: 1950–1953
- Assembly: Detroit Assembly, Detroit, Michigan, U.S.
- Designer: Harley Earl

Body and chassis
- Body style: 4-door sedan 4-door limousine
- Layout: FR layout
- Platform: D-body

Powertrain
- Engine: 331 cu in (5.4 L) OHV V8
- Transmission: 3-speed synchromesh manual 4-speed Hydramatic automatic

Dimensions
- Wheelbase: 146.8 in (3,729 mm)
- Length: 1950: 236.6 in (6,010 mm); 1951: 238.6 in (6,060 mm); 1952: 236.3 in (6,002 mm); 1953: 236.5 in (6,007 mm)
- Width: 80.1 in (2,035 mm)
- Height: 64.1 in (1,628 mm)
- Curb weight: 4,800–5,100 lb (2,200–2,300 kg)

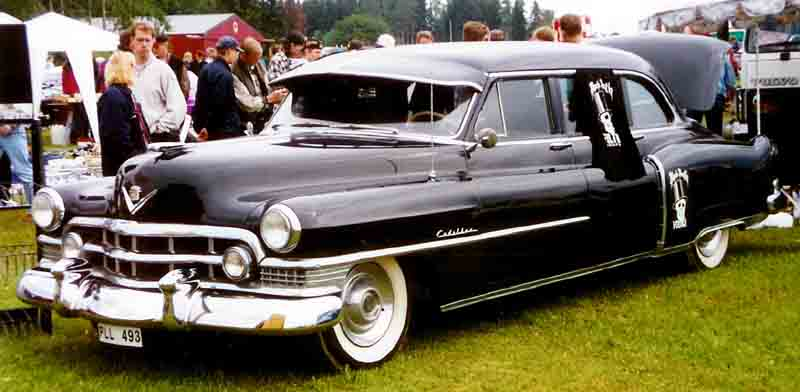
1951 Cadillac Series 75

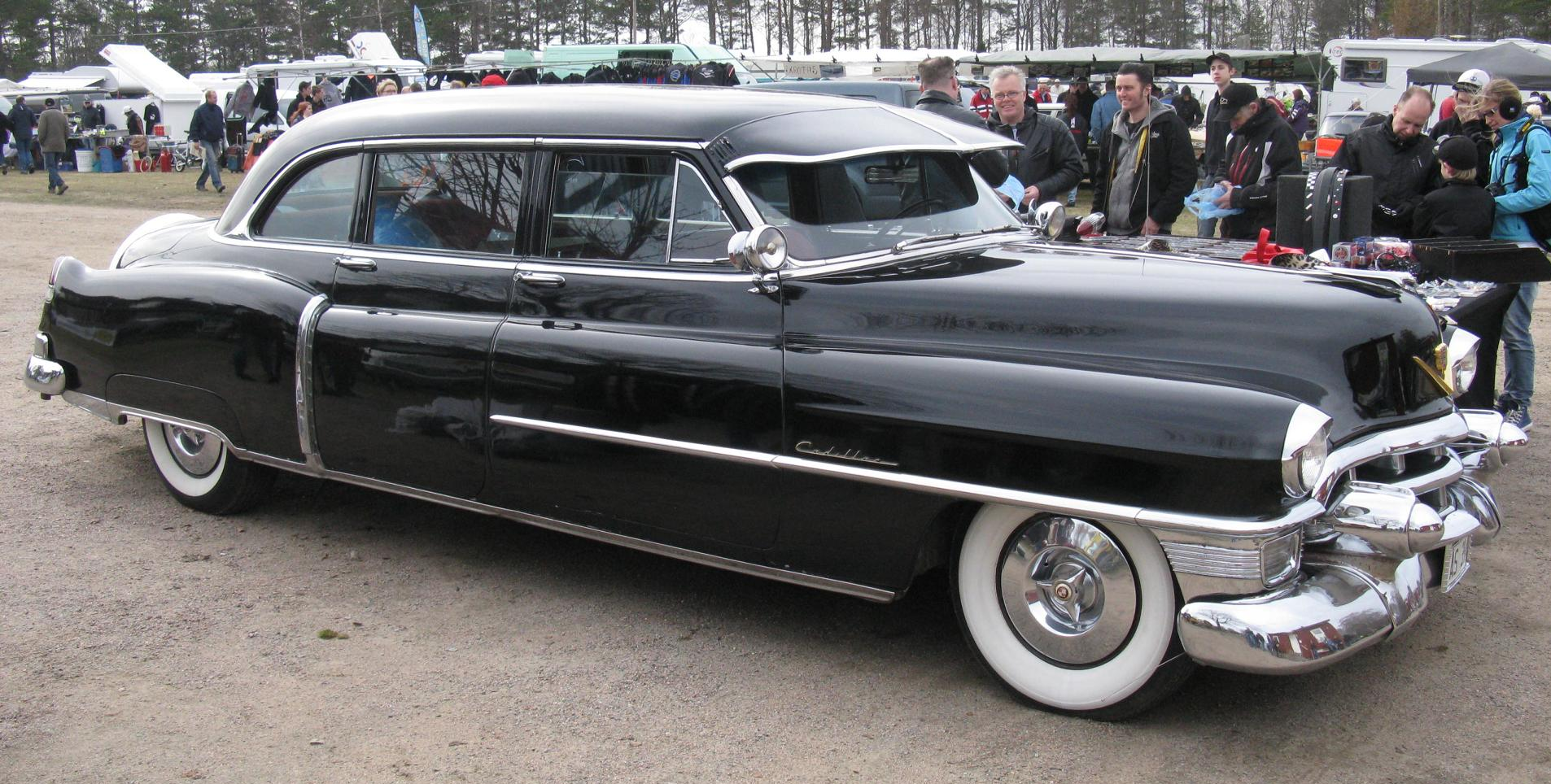
1953 Cadillac Series 75 limousine

An all-new Series 75 was introduced for 1950 which conformed to the postwar styling introduced on other Cadillacs in 1948. This would replace the pre-war design dating back to 1941 with a new 146.8 in (3,730 mm) wheelbase. It featured six-window styling, a one piece windshield, the absence of running boards and a "high-headroom" limousine-type appearance. Seven-passenger seating was again offered via jump seats in the sedan, business sedan and Imperial sedan. Surprisingly Hydramatic automatic transmission was optional but power windows were standard equipment.

A minor face lift and small trim variations were the main Cadillac styling news in 1951. Miniature eggcrate grilles were set into the out-board grille extension panels below the headlights. Larger, bullet shaped style bumper guards were used. Jump seats were used in both the seven-passenger sedan and Imperial limousine. Hydramatic automatic transmission was optional and hydraulic window lifts were standard. Business sedans were built in limited numbers on a special order basis.

In 1952, to commemorate the 50th anniversary of Cadillac, the V-shaped hood and deck emblems were done as gold castings. The grille wraparound panels were redesigned once again having broad chrome trim below each headlight with side scoop styling and gold-colored winged emblem mounted in the center. Back up lights were now standard equipment and were incorporated in the taillights. At the rear all Cadillacs adopted a through the bumper dual exhaust system. Although all Series 75 had been Fleetwood bodied since 1938 it was not until 1952 that Fleetwood script appeared on the rear deck lid. Equipment features were the same and no business sedans were built. Engine output for the 331 was up to 190 hp (142 kW) for 1952. It would borrow the bumper bullets (or dagmars) as a styling cue from the 1951 Le Sabre show car.

1953 saw a redesigned grille with heavier integral bumper and bumper guards, the repositioning of parking lamps directly under the headlights and chrome "eyebrow" type headlamp doors. Wheel discs were fashioned in an attractive new disced design. Otherwise, appearance features and equipment were about the same as in previous years. Regular production models included the Imperial eight-passenger limousine with glass partition or eight-passenger sedan, both with jump seats.

== 1954–1956 ==
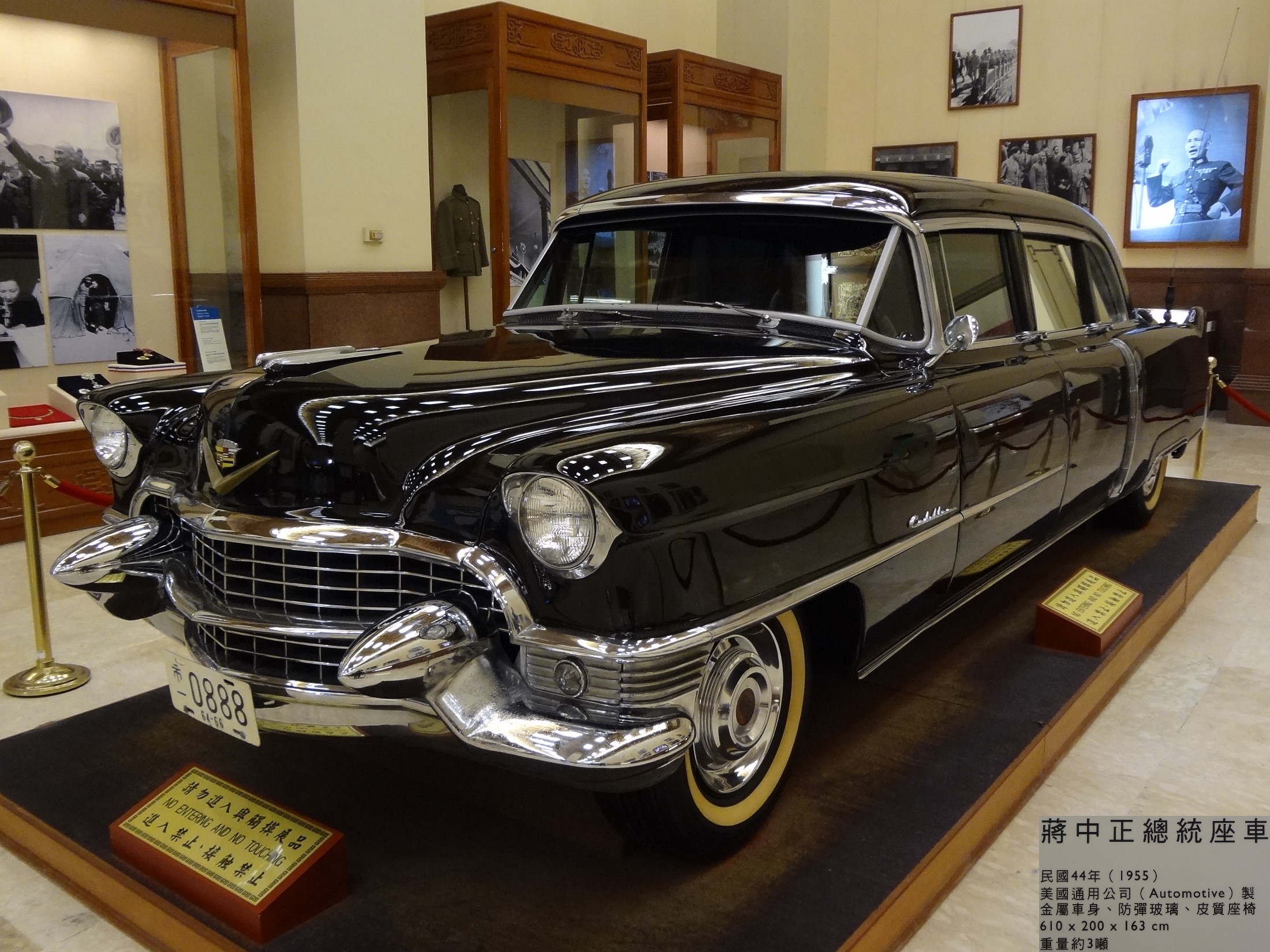
Chiang Kai-shek's 1955 Cadillac Series 75

Series 75
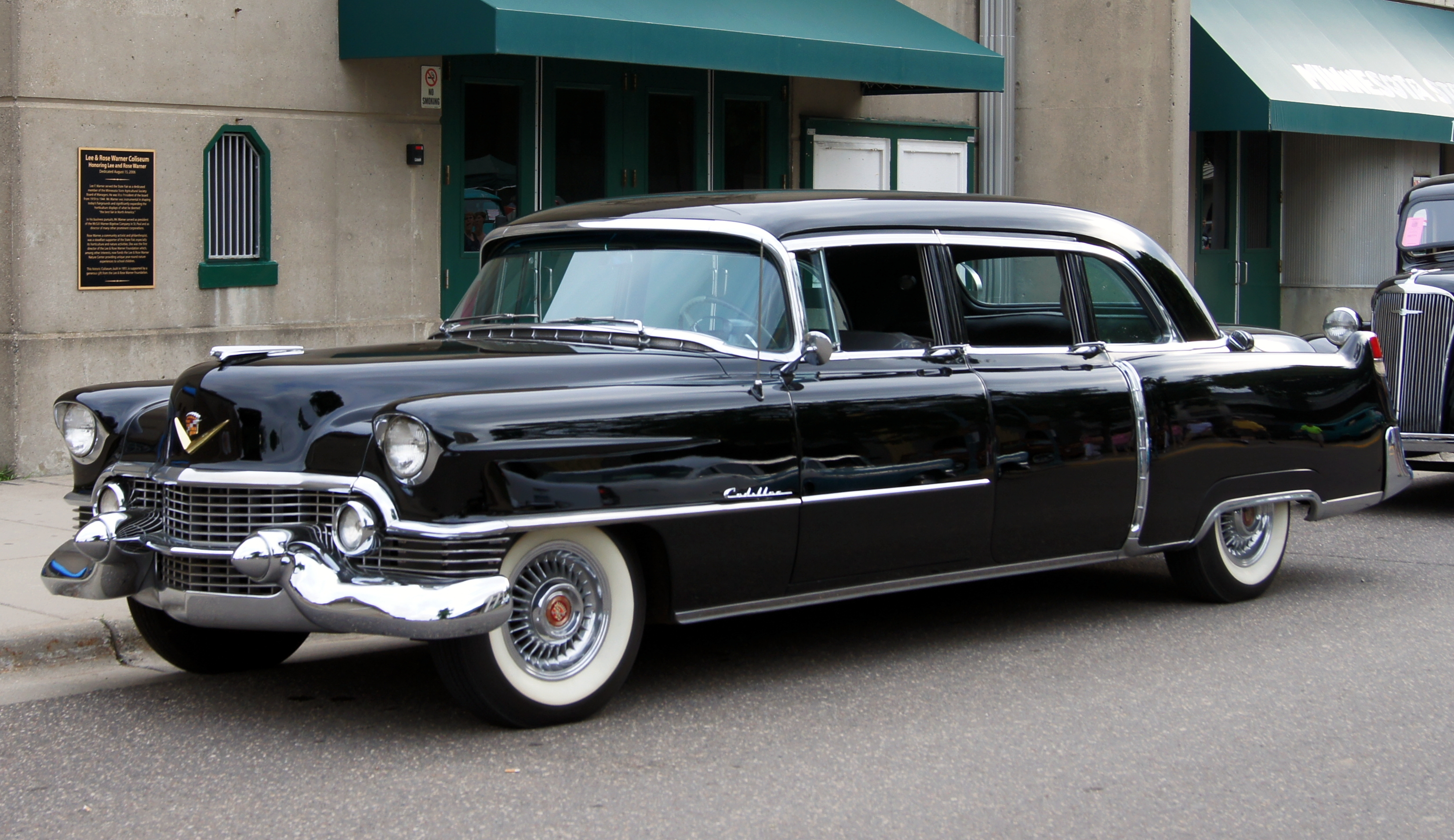
- 1954 Cadillac Series 75

Overview
- Model years: 1954–1956
- Assembly: Detroit Assembly, Detroit, Michigan, U.S.
- Designer: Harley Earl

Body and chassis
- Body style: 4-door sedan 4-door limousine
- Layout: FR layout
- Platform: D-body

Powertrain
- Engine: 331 cu in (5.4 L) OHV V8; 365 cu in (6.0 L) OHV V8
- Transmission: 3-speed synchromesh manual 4-speed Hydramatic automatic

Dimensions
- Wheelbase: 149.8 in (3,805 mm)
- Length: 1954–55: 237.1 in (6,022 mm); 1956: 235.7 in (5,987 mm)
- Width: 1954: 79.6 in (2,022 mm); 1955: 79.8 in (2,027 mm); 1955: 80.1 in (2,035 mm)
- Height: 66.2 in (1,681 mm)
- Curb weight: 5,200–5,300 lb (2,400–2,400 kg)

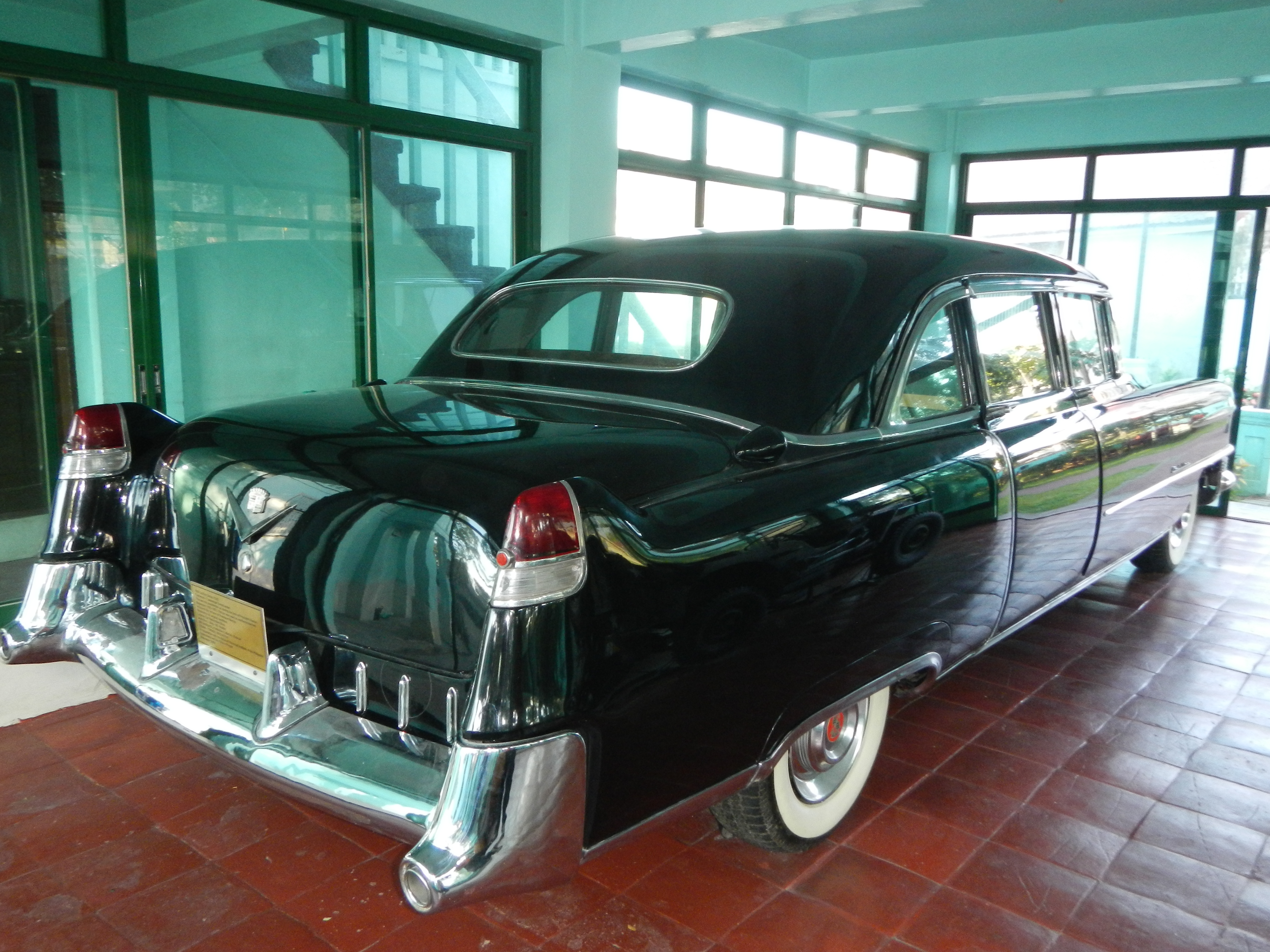
1955 Cadillac Series 75-23 (Fleetwood seven-passenger formal sedan of President Ramon Magsaysay)

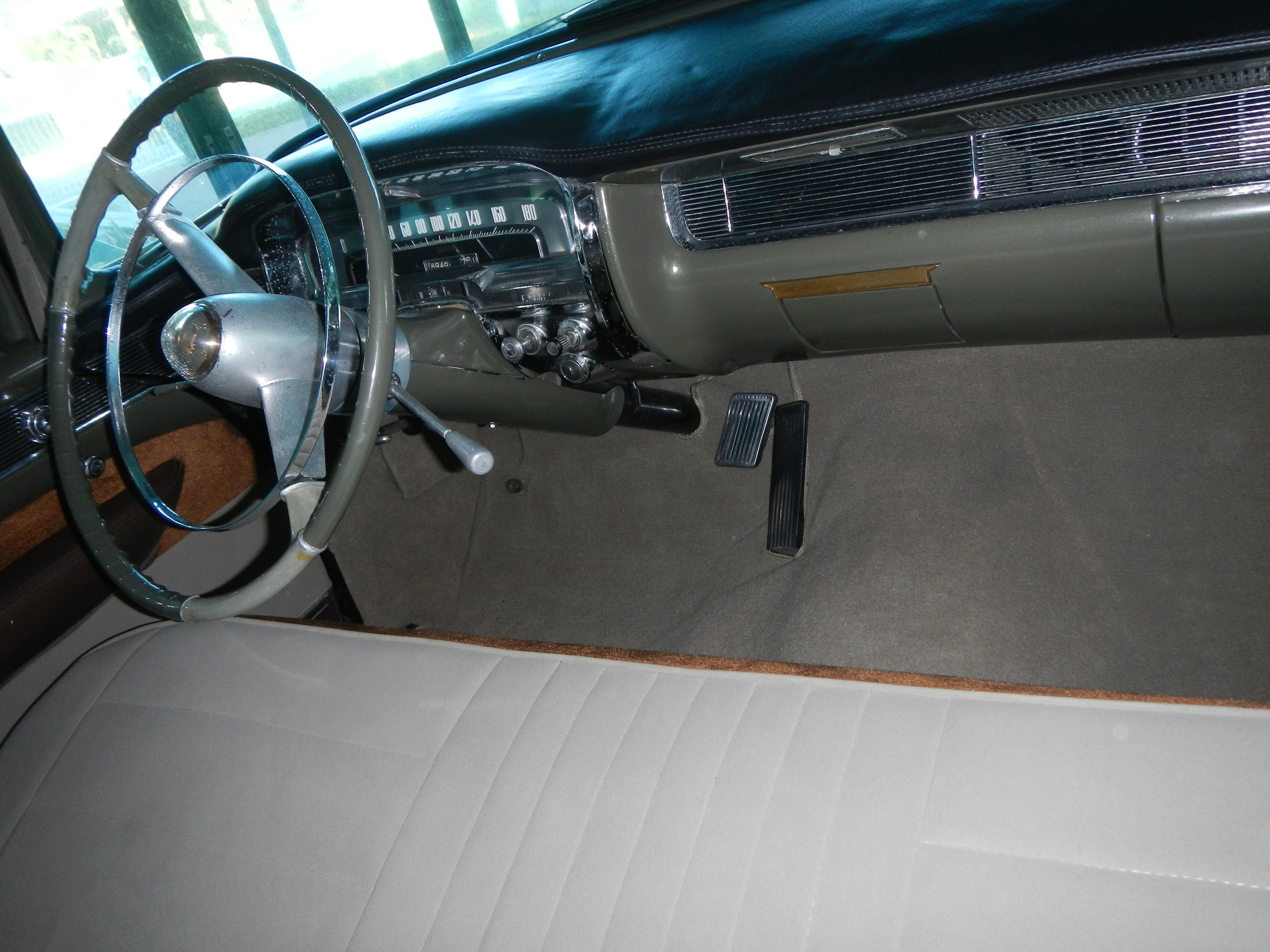
1955 Cadillac Series 75 interior

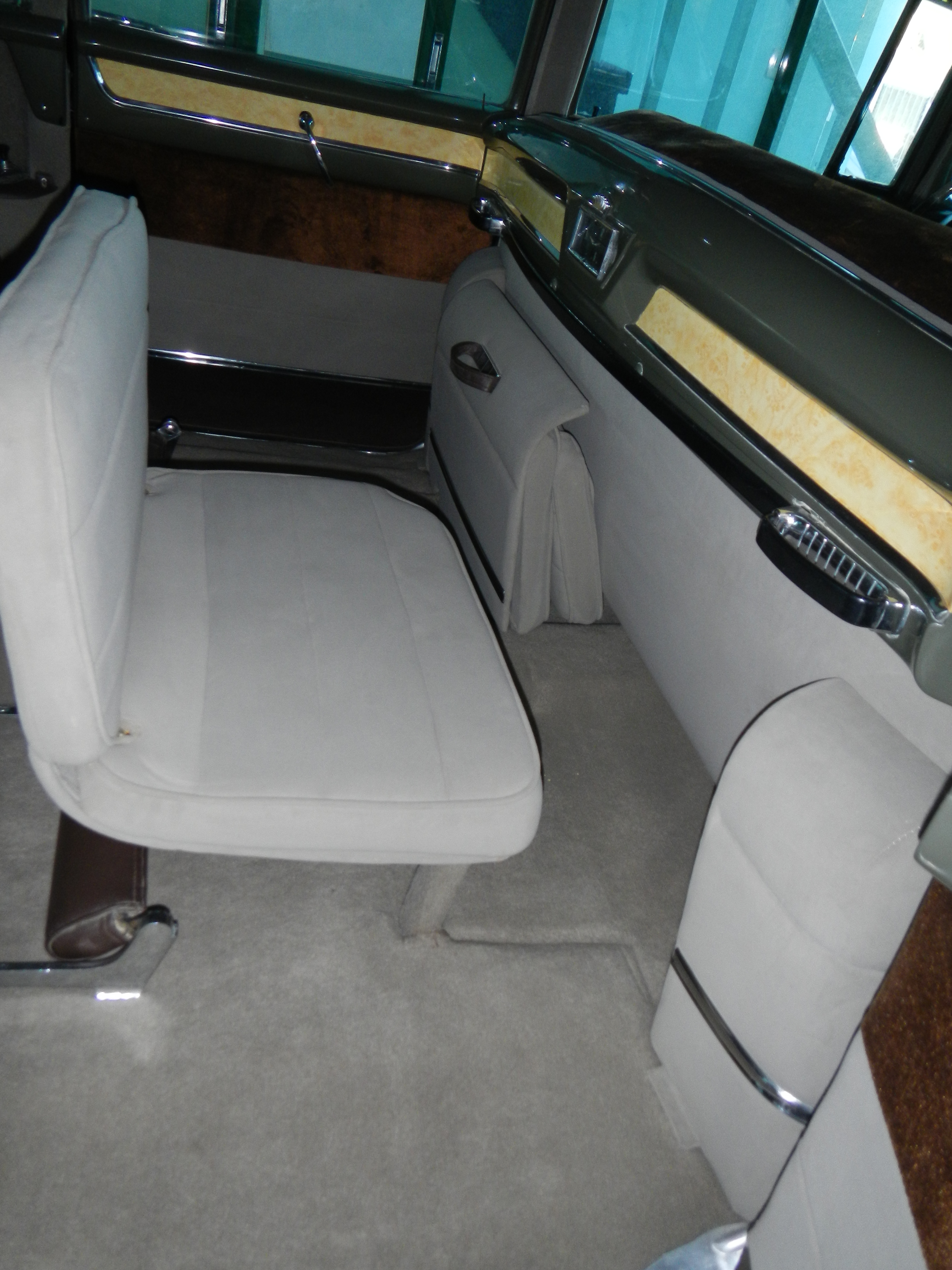
1955 Cadillac Series 75 jumpseat

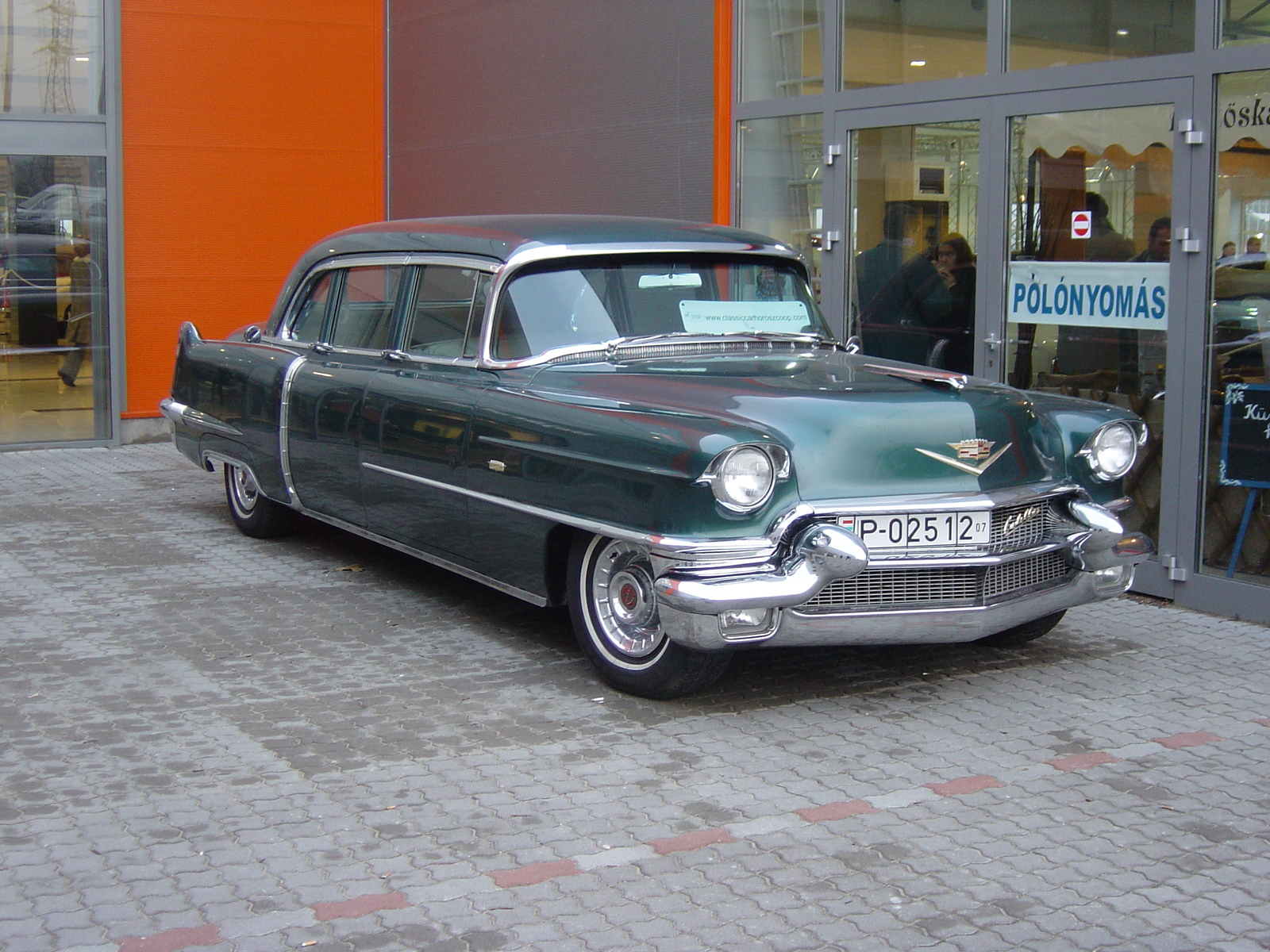
1956 Cadillac Series 75

The big Series 75 "high-headroom" car came as an eight-passenger limousine with driver's partition or eight-passenger sedan without partition, both having jump seats. The Series 75 included a lower sleeker appearing body, a new cellular grille insert, and inverted gull wing front bumpers and tapered dagmar style bumper guards. Round jet style dual exhaust outlets were incorporated into the vertical bumper extensions and the rear bumper was entirely redesigned. An Eldorado-style wraparound windshield was seen. A wide ventilator intake was now stretched across the base of the windshield and a chrome visored headlamp look was emphasized. V-shaped ornaments appeared on the hood and deck lid with Fleetwood script in the latter location. Wheelbase was up to 149.8 in (3,805 mm) for 1954, and engine output jumped to 230 hp (172 kW).

In 1955 the grille was redesigned with wider spaces between the blades and the parking lamps were repositioned beneath directly below the headlights. The trim of the Series 75 long wheelbase model was distinctive from other lines. A horizontal rub molding ran from the front parking light housings to the trailing edge of the front door and stopped. A full-length vertical air slot-style fender break molding was placed directly behind the rear gap of the back doors. The two moldings did not meet at right angles. A Fleetwood script appeared on the rear deck lid. The high headroom appearance was seen again. Both the sedan and the limousine continued to feature auxiliary seats for extra passenger carrying capacity and the Imperial limousine had a hydraulically operated glass driver's partition. Engine output was increased to 250 hp (186 kW). An optional dual-four barrel carb setup boasted 270 hp (201 kW). Hydramatic automatic transmission was now standard equipment.

In 1956 there was a new grille, with finer textured insert, and the repositioning of the parking lights in the bumpers, below the wing guards. Buyers were given an option of the standard satin finish grille or an optional gold finish. Cadillac script was found on the left side. A narrow chrome molding and nine vertical louvers were seen. Side trim was about the same as in 1955, except for the addition of exhaust extension moldings on the rear fender. The trim ran long a tapering conical flare from above the wheel housing to the rear bumper. A Fleetwood script appeared on the deck lid and limousine styling was seen again. Both the sedan and the limousine had auxiliary seats and the Imperial limousine again featured a glass driver's partition. Standard equipment was comparable to the previous year. The engine was stroked to 365 cu in (6.0 L) for 285 or 305 hp (213 or 227 kW) in 1956.

== 1957–1958 ==
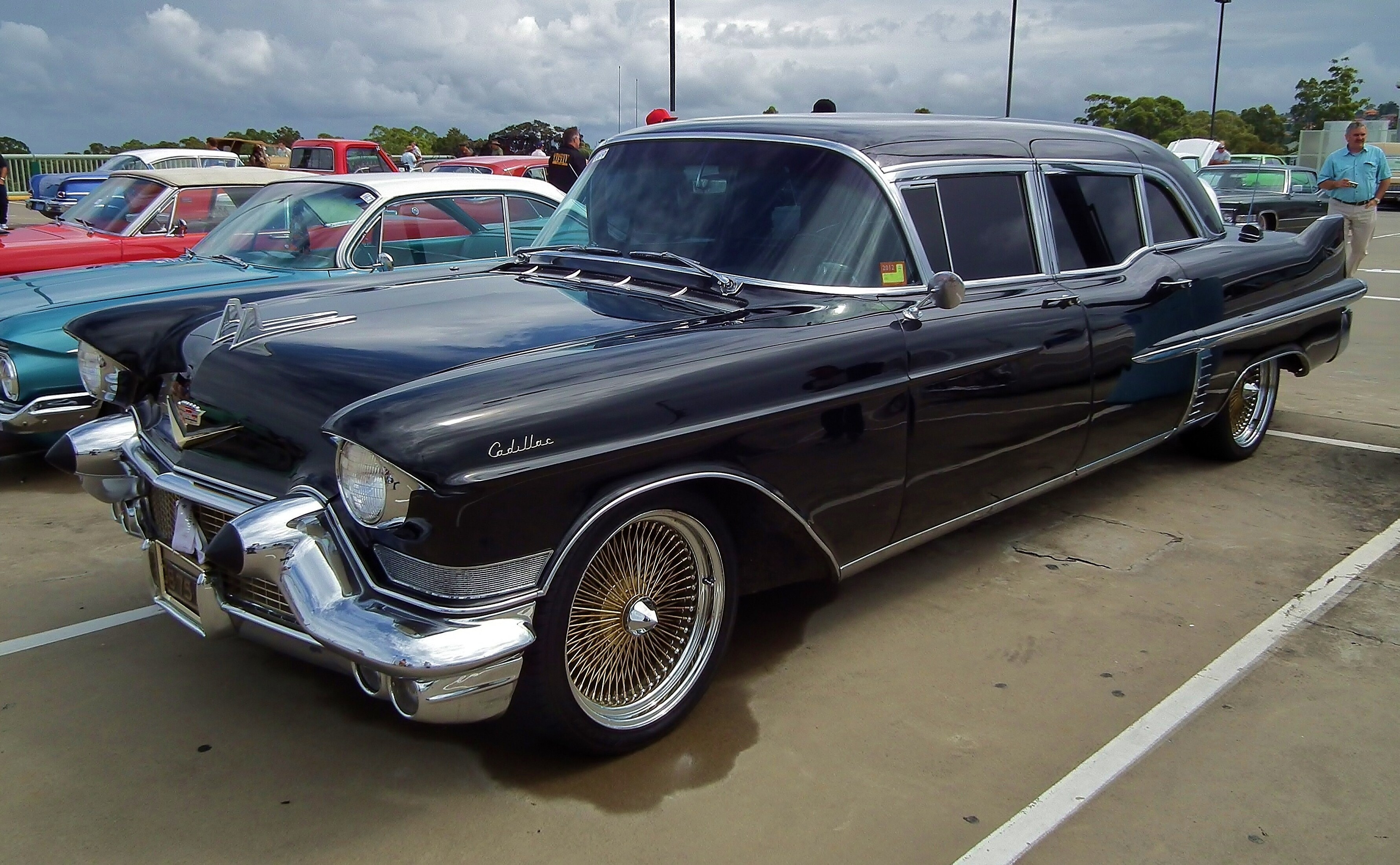
1957 Cadillac Series 75 limousine with aftermarket wheels

Series 70/75
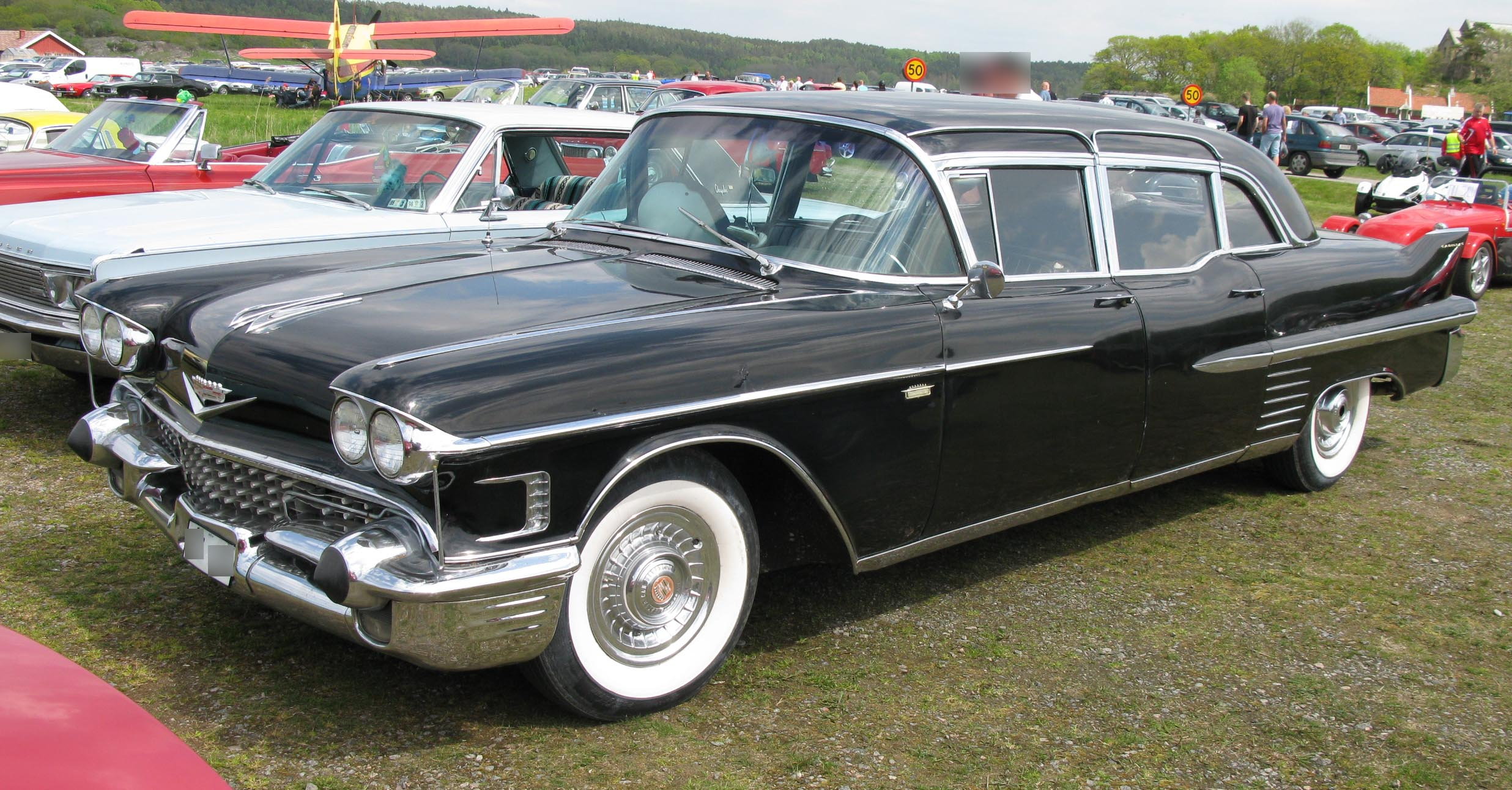

Overview
- Model years: 1957–1958
- Assembly: Detroit Assembly, Detroit, Michigan, U.S.
- Designer: Harley Earl

Body and chassis
- Body style: Series 70: 4-door hardtop Series 75: 4-door sedan 4-door limousine
- Layout: FR layout
- Platform: Series 75: D-body

Powertrain
- Engine: 365 cu in (6.0 L) OHV V8
- Transmission: 4-speed Hydramatic automatic

Dimensions
- Wheelbase: Series 70: 126.0 in (3,200 mm); Series 75: 149.7 in (3,802 mm)
- Length: Series 70: 216.3 in (5,494 mm); Series 75: 1957: 236.2 in (5,999 mm); 1958: 237.1 in (6,022 mm)
- Width: Series 70: 78.5 in (1,994 mm); Series 75: 1957: 80.0 in (2,032 mm); 1958: 79.9 in (2,029 mm)
- Height: Series 70: 55.5 in (1,410 mm); Series 75: 1957: 63.7 in (1,618 mm); 1958: 61.6 in (1,565 mm)
- Curb weight: 5,500–5,700 lb (2,500–2,600 kg)

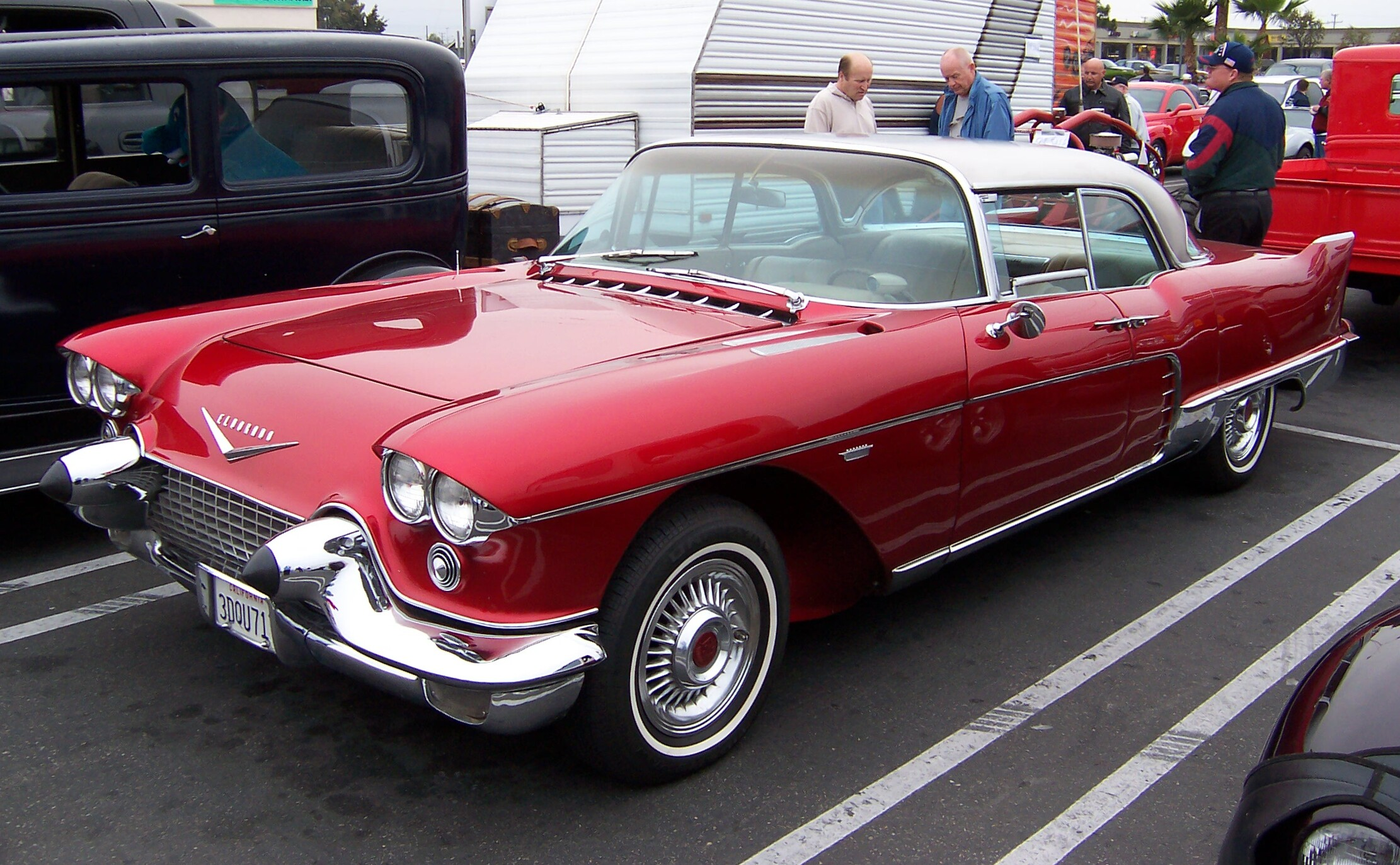
1957 Cadillac Series 70 Eldorado Brougham

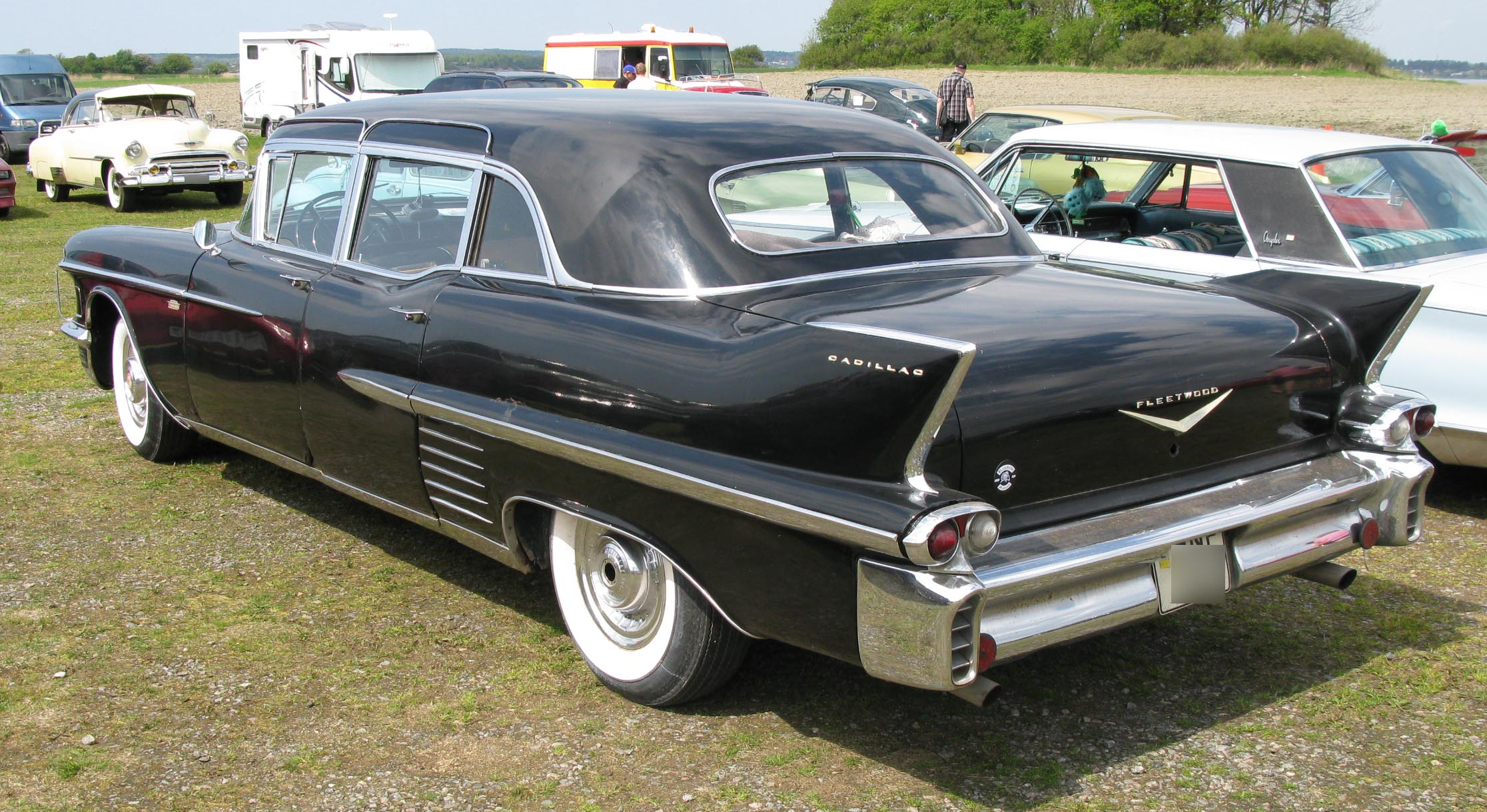
1958 Cadillac Series 75 rear

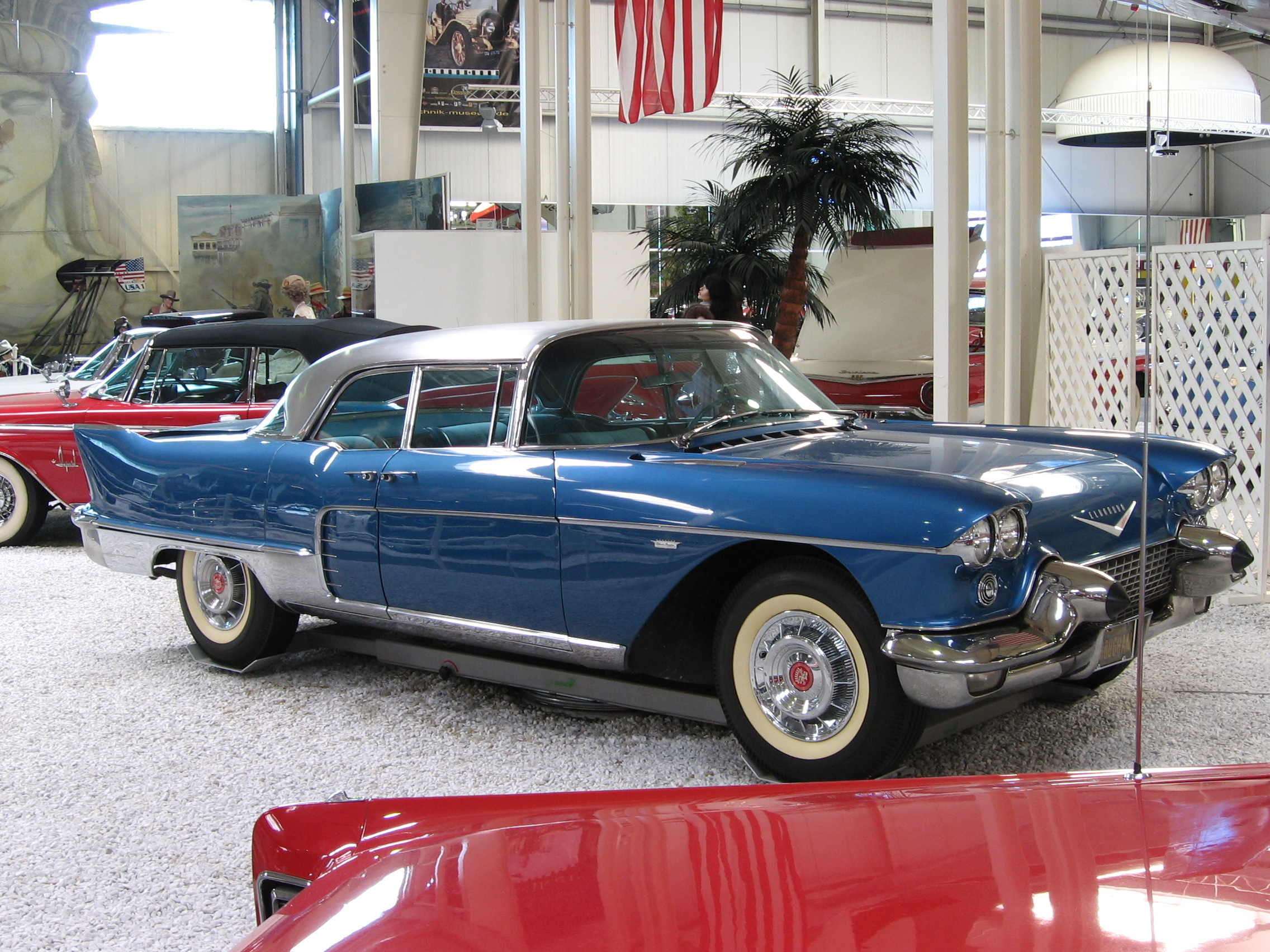
1958 Cadillac Series 70 Eldorado Brougham

In 1957 a tubular X-frame without side rails was adopted. This resulted in greater structural rigidity and provided for a lower body without a loss of usable space. Front end styling was marked by rubber bumper guard tips and dual circular lamps set into the lower bumper section. Side trim was revised and a dual taillight theme was used. Identifying the Series 75 were bright metal moldings, just forward of the rear wheel openings, highlighted by seven horizontal wind splits. At the upper end this fender break trim joined a horizontal molding that ran along a conical flare extending towards both taillamps. The Series 75 came as a limousine or in a nine-passenger sedan configuration, both with auxiliary seats. Power was 300 to 325 hp (224 to 242 kW) for 1957.

In 1958 there was a new grille featuring multiple round "cleats" at the intersection of the horizontal and vertical members. The grille insert was wider and new bumper guards were positioned lower to the parking lamps. New dual headlamps were used and small chrome fins decorated the front fenders. Tailfins were less pronounced and trim attachments were revised. On the sides of the car were five longer horizontal wind splits ahead of the unskirted rear wheel housing and front fender horizontal mouldings with crests placed above the trailing edge and no rocker sill trim. The limousine and nine-passenger long wheelbase sedan were available once again.

The highly expensive and exclusive four-door Cadillac Eldorado Brougham hardtop marked the return of the name Series 70, but for only two years, as from 1959 to 1960 the Eldorado Brougham was denoted a Series 6900, and it was discontinued thereafter. Announced in December 1956 and released around March 1957, the Series 70 Eldorado Brougham was a hand built, limited car derived from the Park Avenue and Orleans show cars of 1953–54. Designed by Ed Glowacke, it featured the first appearance of quad headlights and totally unique trim. The exterior ornamentation included wide, ribbed lower rear quarter beauty panels extending along the rocker sills and rectangularly sculptured side body "cove" highlighted with five horizontal wind splits on the rear doors. Tail styling treatments followed the Eldorado pattern. This four-door hardtop with rear suicide doors was an ultra-luxury car that cost an astonishing $13,074 — twice the price of any other 1957 Eldorado and more than the Rolls-Royce Silver Cloud of the same year. It featured a stainless steel roof, air suspension, the first automatic "memory" power seats, a dual four-barrel V-8, low profile tires with thin white-walls, automatic trunk opener, Cruise Control, high pressure cooling system, polarized sun visors, Signal-Seeking twin speaker radio, electric antenna, automatic-release parking brake, electric door locks, dual heating system, silver magnetized glovebox, drink tumblers, cigarette and tissue dispensers, lipstick and cologne, ladies compact with powder puff, mirror and matching leather notebook, comb and mirror, Arpège atomizer with Lanvin perfume, automatic starter with restart function, Autronic Eye, drum-type electric clock, power windows, forged aluminum wheels and air conditioning. Buyers of Broughams had a choice of 44 full leather interior and trim combinations and could select such items as Mouton, Karakul or lambskin carpeting. The 1957 Series 70 Eldorado Brougham joined the Sixty Special and the Series 75 as the only Cadillac models with Fleetwood bodies although Fleetwood script or crests did not appear anywhere on the exterior of the car, and so this would also mark the first time in 20 years that a Fleetwood bodied car was paired with the Brougham name. There were serious difficulties with the air suspension. Some owners found it cheaper to have the system removed and replaced with conventional coil springs. Only 400 Series 70 Eldorado Broughams were sold in 1957.

The major changes to the Series 70 Eldorado Brougham in 1958 were seen inside the car. The interior upper door panels were finished in leather instead of the metal finish used in 1957. New wheel covers also appeared. Forty-four trim combinations were available, along with 15 special monotone paint colors. A total of 304 Series 70 Eldorado Broughams were sold in 1958. 1958 was the last year for the domestic production of the handbuilt Series 70 Eldorado Brougham at Cadillac's Detroit factory, as future manufacturing of the special bodies was transferred to Pininfarina of Turin, Italy. It was relabeled the Series 6900 in 1959.

== 1959–1960 ==
Series 70/75
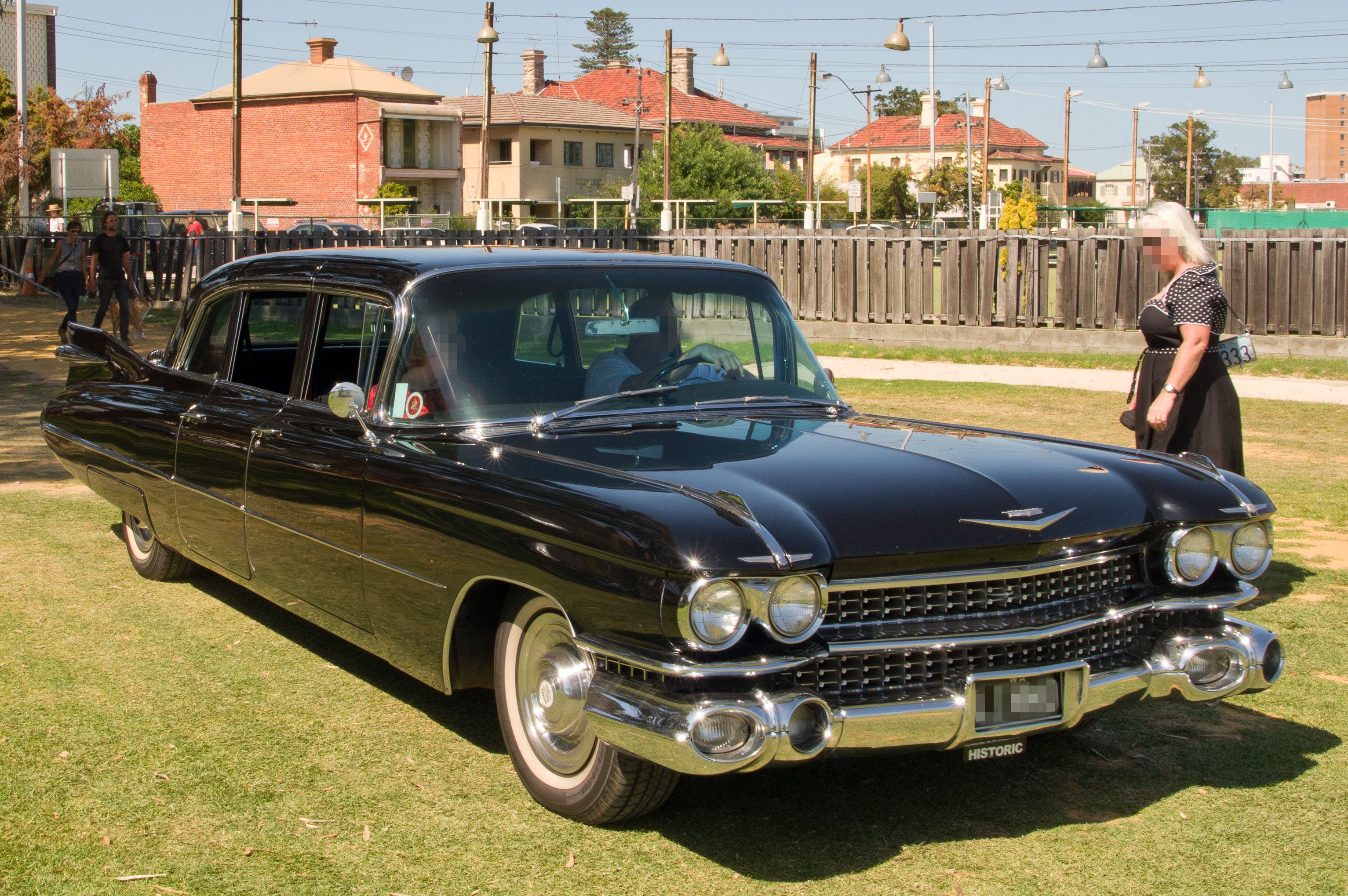

Overview
- Model years: 1959–1960
- Assembly: Detroit Assembly, Detroit, Michigan, U.S.
- Designer: Bill Mitchell

Body and chassis
- Body style: 4-door sedan 4-door limousine
- Layout: FR layout
- Platform: D-body

Powertrain
- Engine: 390 cu in (6.4 L) OHV V8
- Transmission: 4-speed Hydramatic automatic

Dimensions
- Wheelbase: 149.8 in (3,805 mm)
- Length: 244.8 in (6,218 mm)
- Width: 1959: 80.2 in (2,037 mm); 1960: 79.9 in (2,029 mm)
- Height: 59.3 in (1,506 mm)
- Curb weight: 5,700–5,800 lb (2,600–2,600 kg)

The 1959 Cadillac incorporated totally new styling with a large tailfin, twin bullet taillamps, new jewel-like grille patterns and matching deck-lid beauty panels personified these cars. The in-house code number for the model was changed from 7500 to 6700, in keeping with Cadillac's new numbering scheme, but the commercial name remained "Series Seventy-Five". Production models again were a nine-passenger sedan and Imperial limousine with auxiliary jump seats. The "Imperial" term was no longer used soon after Chrysler introduced their top-level luxury sedans and limousines with the Imperial in 1955.

Fleetwood lettering appeared on the rear deck lid trim strip. Single side trim moldings extended from the front wheel housing to the rear of the car. Standard equipment included power brakes; power steering; Hydramatic automatic transmission; dual back-up lamps; windshield washers and two-speed wipers; wheel discs; dual outside rearview mirror; vanity mirror; oil filter and power vent windows. Power steering and shock absorbers were improved this year. Engine displacement on the Cadillac OHV V8 was increased to 390 cu in (6.4 L).

The 1960 Cadillacs exhibited smoother styling, more subtle rendition of the styling theme introduced one year earlier. General changes included a full-width grille; the elimination of pointed front bumper guards; increased restraint in the application of chrome trim; lower tailfins with oval shaped nacelles which encased stacked taillights and back up lamps and front fender mounted directional indicator lamps. The long wheelbase sedan and limousine had auxiliary jump seats, high-headroom formal six-window styling, broad ribbed edge beauty panels and trim generally similar to Series 6200 Cadillacs in other respects. The limousine passenger compartment was trimmed in either bradford cloth or Bedford cloth, both in combinations with wool. Florentine leather upholstery was used in the chauffeur's compartment. Standard equipment was essentially the same as the previous year.

== 1961–1965 ==
Eighth generation
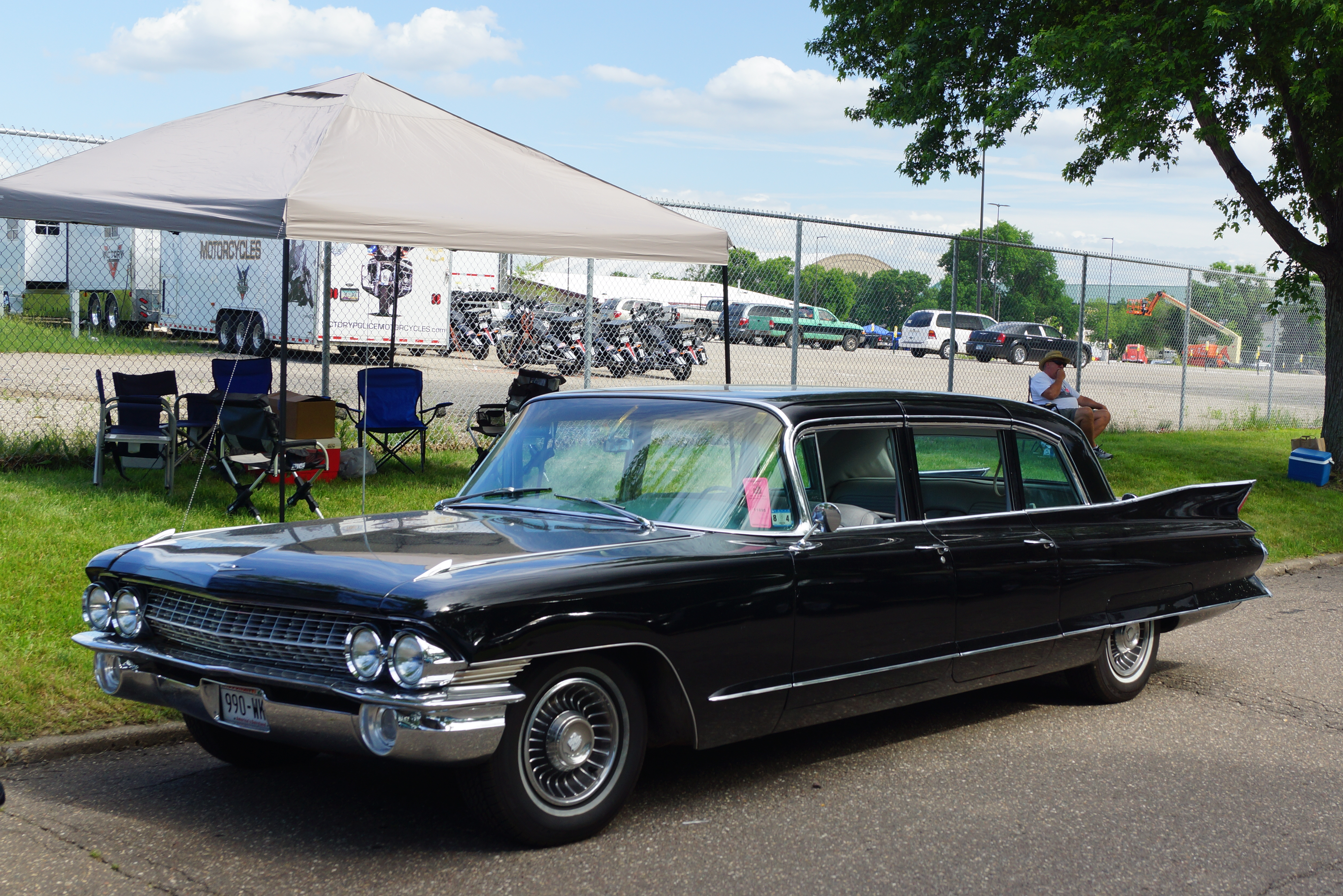
- 1961 Cadillac Fleetwood Seventy-Five Sedan

Overview
- Model years: 1961–1965
- Assembly: Detroit Assembly, Detroit, Michigan, U.S.
- Designer: Bill Mitchell

Body and chassis
- Body style: 4-door sedan 4-door limousine
- Layout: FR layout
- Platform: D-body

Powertrain
- Engine: 390 cu in (6.4 L) OHV V8; 429 cu in (7.0 L) OHV V8
- Transmission: 4-speed Hydramatic automatic

Dimensions
- Wheelbase: 149.8 in (3,805 mm); Commercial: 156.0 in (3,962 mm)
- Length: 1961–62: 242.3 in (6,154 mm); 1963: 243.3 in (6,180 mm); 1964–65: 243.8 in (6,193 mm)
- Width: 1961–62: 80.6 in (2,047 mm); 1963: 79.9 in (2,029 mm); 1964: 79.8 in (2,027 mm); 1965: 79.9 in (2,029 mm)
- Height: 59.0 in (1,499 mm)
- Curb weight: 5,400–5,600 lb (2,400–2,500 kg)

Cadillac was restyled and re-engineered for 1961. The new grille slanted back towards both the bumper and the hood lip, along the horizontal plane, and sat between dual headlamps. While the rest of the model line gained new rearward slanting A pillars and a less severely wrapped windshield the Series 75 continued with the greenhouse design introduced in 1959. New standard equipment included a remote control trunk lock.

A mild face lift characterized Cadillac styling trends for 1962. A flatter grille with a thicker horizontal center bar and more delicate cross-hatched insert appeared. Ribbed chrome trim panel, seen ahead of the front wheel housings in 1961, were now replaced with cornering lamps and front fender model and series identification badges were eliminated. More massive front bumper end pieces appeared and housed rectangular parking lamps. At the rear tail lamps were now housed in vertical nacelles designed with an angled peak at the center. A vertically ribbed rear beauty panel appeared on the deck lid latch panel. Cadillac script also appeared on the lower left side of the radiator grille. New standard equipment included remote control outside rearview mirror, heater and defroster and front cornering lamps.

Exterior changes for 1963 imparted a bolder and more angular look. Hoods and deck lids were redesigned. The front fenders projected 4.625 in (117 mm) further forward than in 1962 while the tailfins were trimmed down somewhat to provide a lower profile. The body side sculpturing from the previous two years was eliminated. The slightly V-shaped radiator grille was taller and now incorporated outer extensions that swept below the flush-fender dual headlamps. Smaller circular front parking lamps were mounted in those extensions. Cadillac's extra-long nine-passenger cars were the only pillared four-door sedans in the line. Standard equipment again essentially remained unchanged. Trimmings included a full-length lower beltline molding of a simple yet elegant design. Convertible top like rooflines and windshields with forward "dog-leg" pillars were 1961 carryovers seen exclusively on this series. The engine was entirely changed for 1963, though the displacement and output remained the same.

It was time for another facelift in 1964 and really a minor one. New up front was a bi-angular grille that formed a V-shape along both its vertical and horizontal planes. The main horizontal grille bar was now carried around the body sides. Outer grille extension panels again housed the parking and cornering lamps. It was the 17th consecutive year for the Cadillac tailfins with a new fine-blade design carrying on the tradition. Equipment features were same as in 1963 for the most part. Comfort Control, a completely automatic heating and air conditioning system controlled by a dial thermostat on the instrument panel, was introduced as an industry first. The engine was bumped to 429 cu in (7.0 L) OHV V8 for 1964. 340 hp (254 kW) was the result.

Cadillac's longest, heaviest, richest, and highest priced model was again more conventionally engineered than the other lines in 1965. For example, the new perimeter frame was not in use and neither was the improved automatic transmission. In addition automatic level control was not featured. Even the annual styling face lift did not affect these tradition-bound luxury cars. They came with all power controls found in Eldorados and added courtesy and map lights and the standard equipment list. Sales of the commercial chassis earned an increase of 30 units, while limousine deliveries tapered slightly downward and the popularity of the nine-passenger sedan saw a considerable decline.

== 1966–1970 ==
Ninth generation
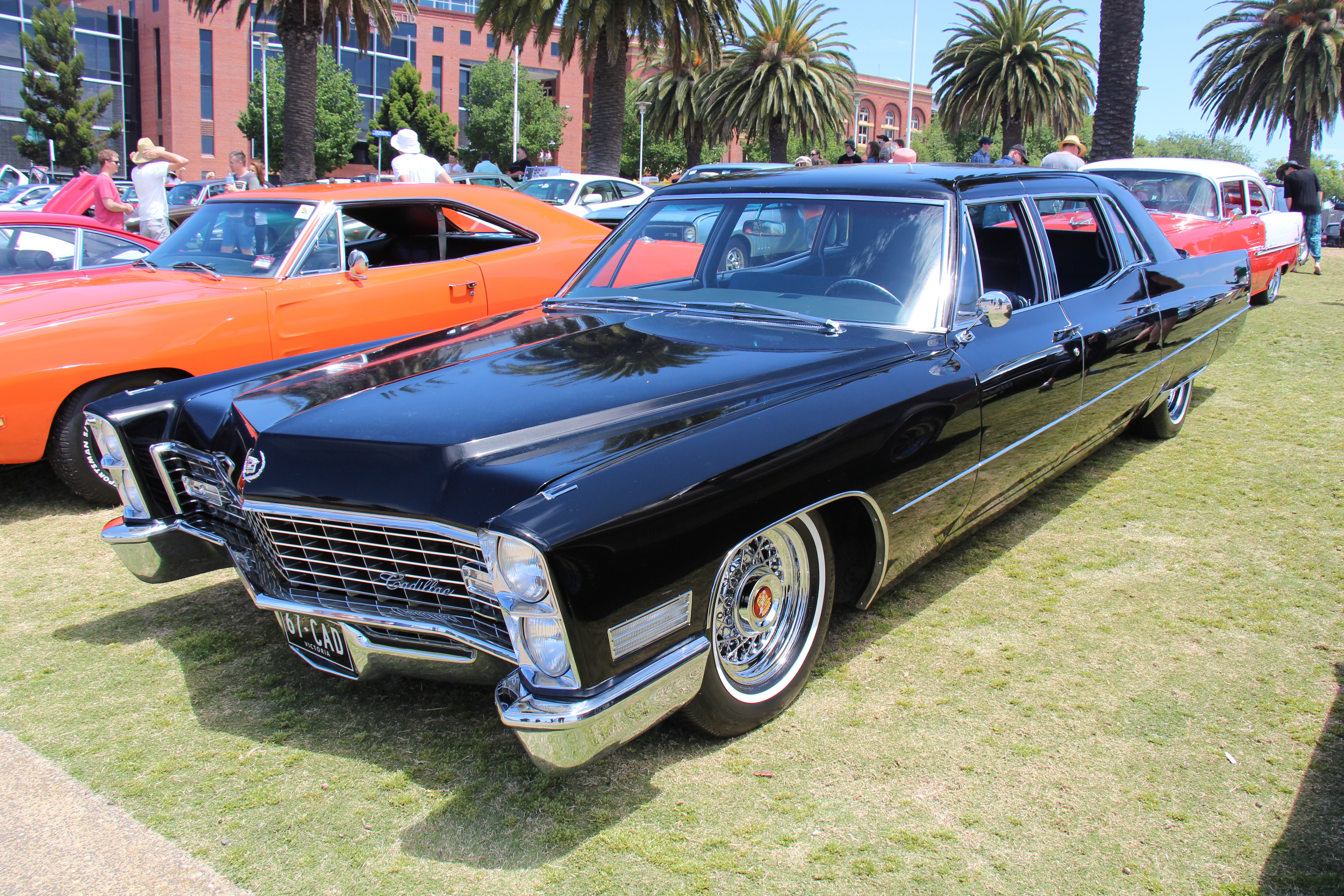
- 1967 Cadillac Fleetwood Seventy-Five

Overview
- Model years: 1966–1970
- Assembly: Detroit Assembly, Detroit, Michigan, U.S.
- Designer: Bill Mitchell

Body and chassis
- Body style: 4-door sedan 4-door limousine
- Layout: FR layout
- Platform: D-body

Powertrain
- Engine: 429 cu in (7.0 L) OHV V8; 472 cu in (7.7 L) OHV V8
- Transmission: 3-speed Turbo-Hydramatic 400 automatic

Dimensions
- Wheelbase: 149.8 in (3,805 mm); Commercial: 156.0 in (3,962 mm)
- Length: 1966–67: 244.5 in (6,210 mm); 1968: 245.2 in (6,228 mm); 1969–70: 245.5 in (6,236 mm)
- Curb weight: 5,500–5,800 lb (2,500–2,600 kg)

As usual Fleetwood exterior trim and interior appointments enriched the Series 75 in 1966. The first major redesign since 1961 featured a full perimeter frame. The new look brought the appearance of the big sedan and limousine up-to-date so that it matched the visual impression of other Cadillac lines. A big jump in sales for both regular production models, but not the commercial chassis, was the result.

New at Cadillac for 1967 was a redesigned side panel contour that created a longer look and more sculptured appearance. Technical improvements included a revised engine valve train, different carburetor, Mylar printed circuit instrument panel, re-tuned body mounts and a new engine fan with clutch for quieter operation. A squarer cornered radiator grille insert had a cross-hatch pattern that appeared both above the bumper and through a lowered center section of it, with a V-shaped appearance last used in 1954–1956 models. The new grille had a forward angle and blades that seemed to emphasize its vertical members. Rectangular parking lamps were housed in the outer ends. Rear end styling revisions were highlighted by metal divided taillamps and a painted lower bumper section. This year's new styling was particularly beautifully rendered on the Series 75 which had extra-long rear fenders and an extended "greenhouse" with a formal high-headroom look. Fleetwood wreath and crest emblems decorated the hood and the trunk, with Fleetwood block letters at the right side of the deck lid. A simple horizontal body rub molding running the length of the elongated sides added to the elegance. Standard equipment now included automatic level control; air conditioning; carpeted fold-down foot rests and 8.20 × 15 four ply 8PR blackwall tires.

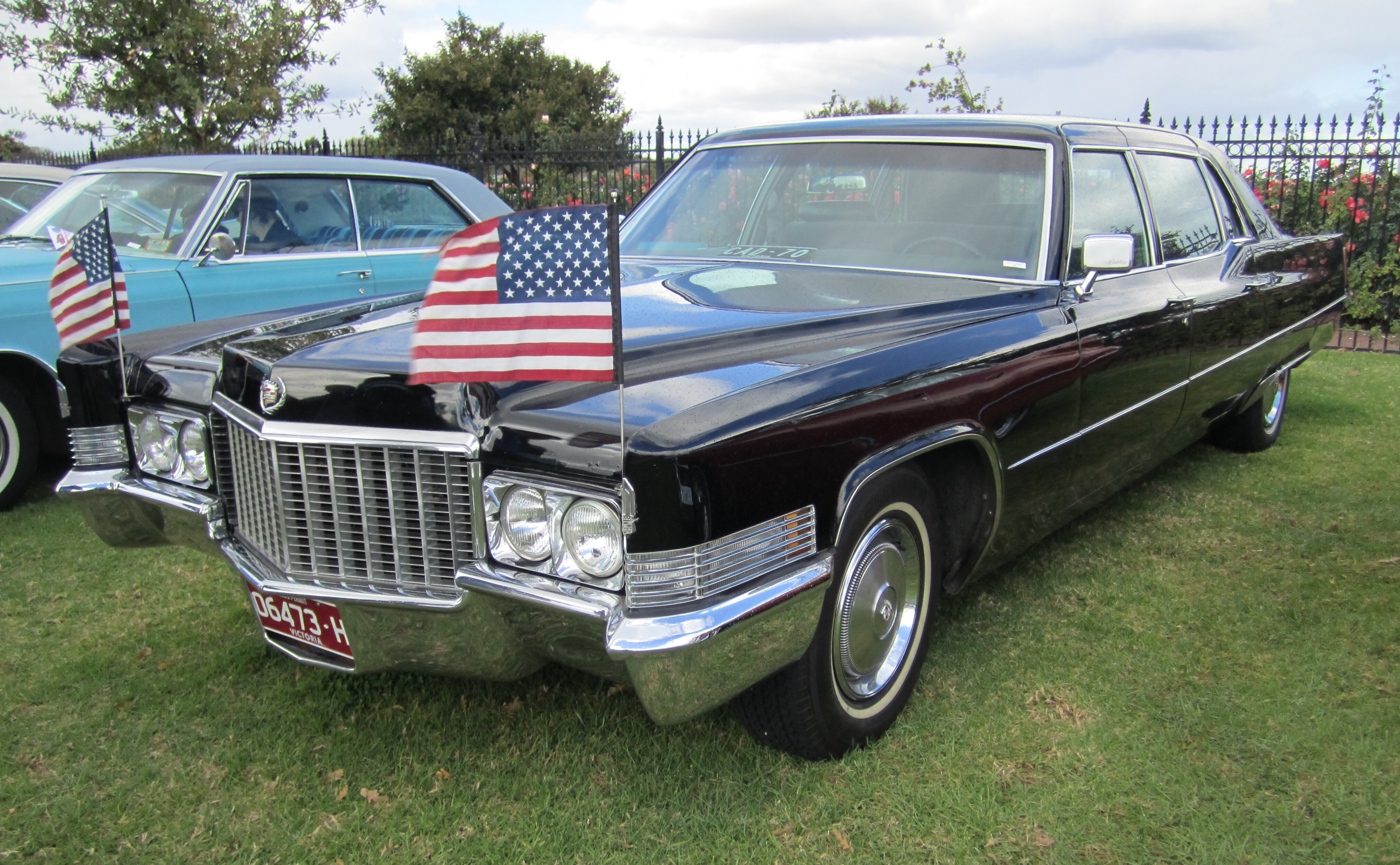
1970 Cadillac Fleetwood Seventy-Five

The same basic styling and engineering continued into the 1968 model year, with a number of refinements. A new grille had an insert with finer mesh and step-down outer section, which held the rectangular parking lights just a little higher than before. Rear end styling was modestly altered. An obvious change was a 8.5 in (216 mm) longer hood, which incorporated recessed windshield wipers. The deck lid also had more of a rake. The standard V8 was enlarged, with the greatest displacement and torque of any American engine, putting out 375 hp (280 kW). Of the 20 exterior paint color combinations 14 were totally new. Again marked by simple extra-long body rub moldings, a formal high-headroom look with doors cut into the roof and Fleetwood-type wreath and crest emblems, the nine-passenger models had the longest Cadillac production wheelbase, as well as power front ventiplanes, automatic level control, right-hand manually operated outside rearview mirrors, 8.20 × 15-8PR blackwall tires and automatic climate control air conditioning as standard equipment.

Although its overall size and character was largely unchanged, the 1969 Cadillac was restyled. Rear quarters were extended to give the car a longer look. There was an all new grille with dual horizontal headlamps positioned in the outboard step down areas of the grille. The hood was again extended, a total of 2.5 in (64 mm) to add the impression of extra length. Stretched body and trim; Fleetwood emblems and embellishments; doors cut into a formal, high-headroom roof, and generally higher appointment and trim levels continued to mark Cadillac's most luxurious line. Standard equipment included automatic level control, automatic climate control, rear window defogger, four rear ashtrays and 8.20 × 15 four-ply blackwall tires.

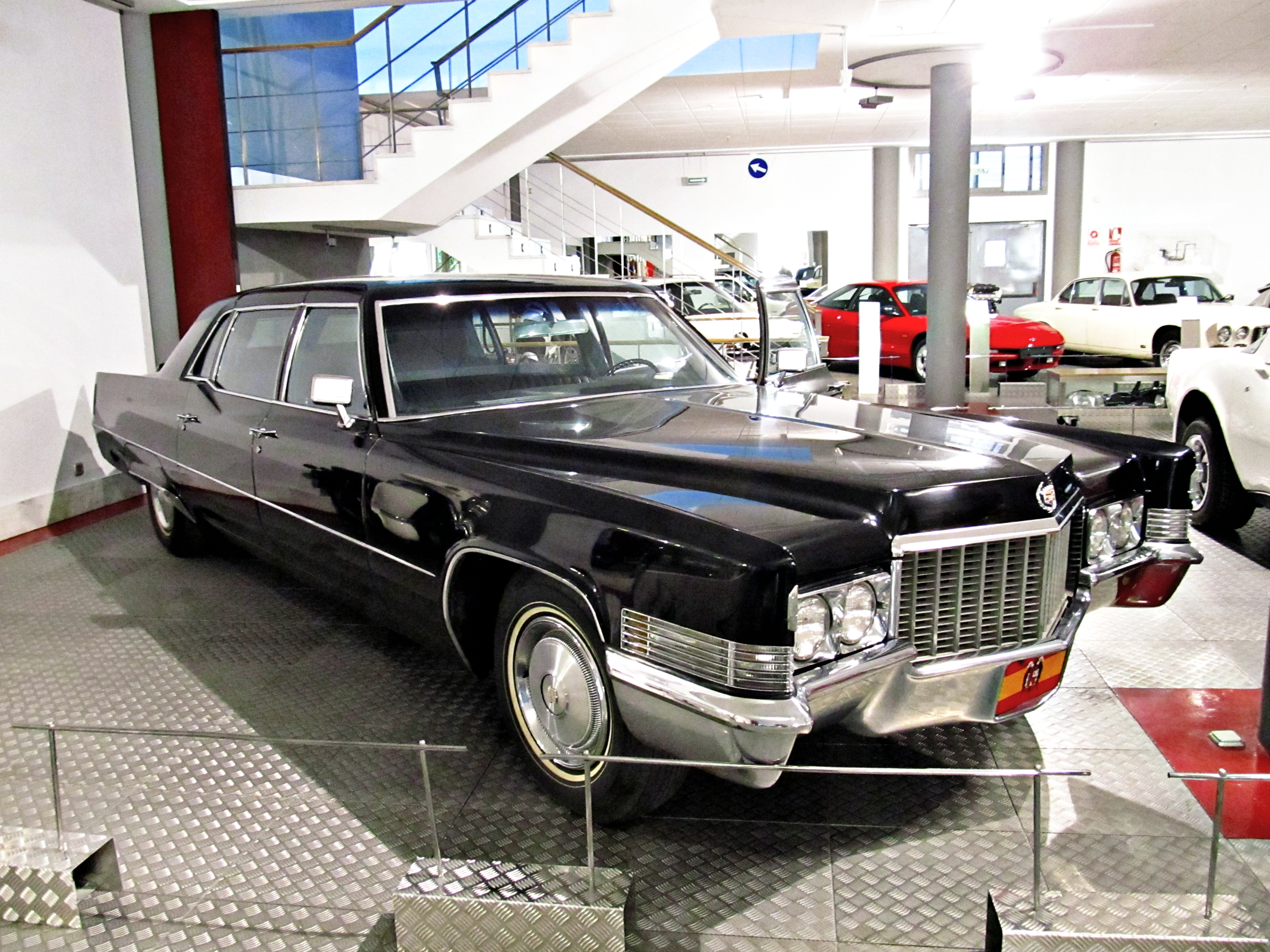
Generalisimo Francisco Franco's 1970 Cadillac Series 75

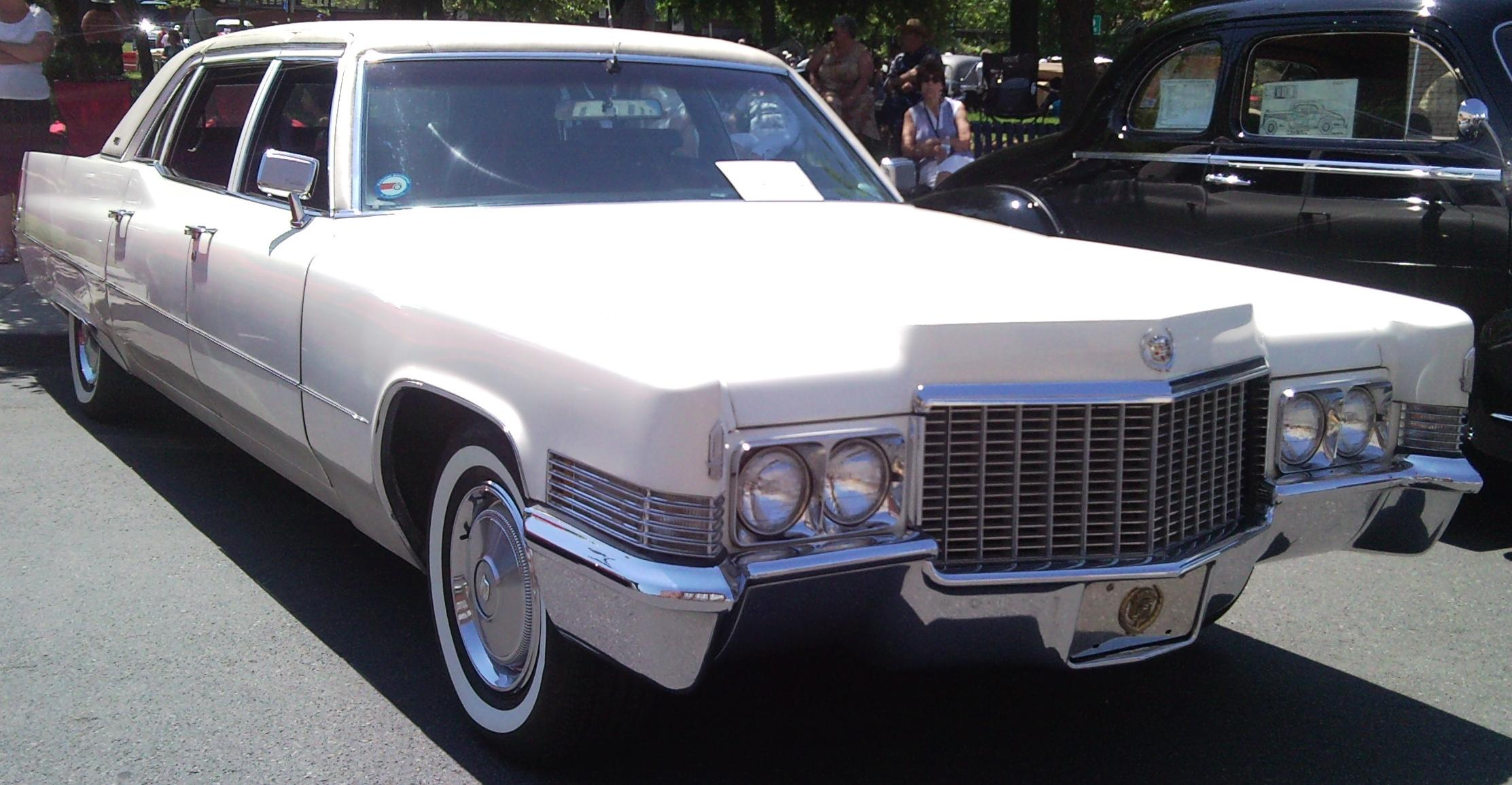
1970 Cadillac Series 75

A relatively minor restyling marked 1970 Cadillacs. A face lift included a new grille with 13 vertical blades set against a delicately cross-hatched rectangular opening. The bright metal headlamp surrounds were bordered with body color to give a more refined look. Narrow vertical taillights were seen again, but no longer had smaller V-chaped bottom lenses pointing downward below the bumper. Wheel discs and winged crest fender tip emblems were new. Special equipment found on the big Cadillac sedan and limousine included automatic level control; rear window defogger; four rear ashtrays and manual right-hand outside rearview mirror. Separate climate control systems were provided for front and rear compartments. Fleetwood wreath crests appeared at the extreme edge of the rear fenders, above the belt molding, on both the sedan and the limousine. As usual, the doors on the limousine cut into the roof and a fixed driver's partition with adjustable glass compartment divider was inside. The front compartment was trimmed in genuine leather, the rear in one of five combinations. Three of these were the more standard Divan cloth trim, while Decardo cloth or Dumbarton cloth with leather were the richest selections available.

== 1971–1976 ==
Tenth generation
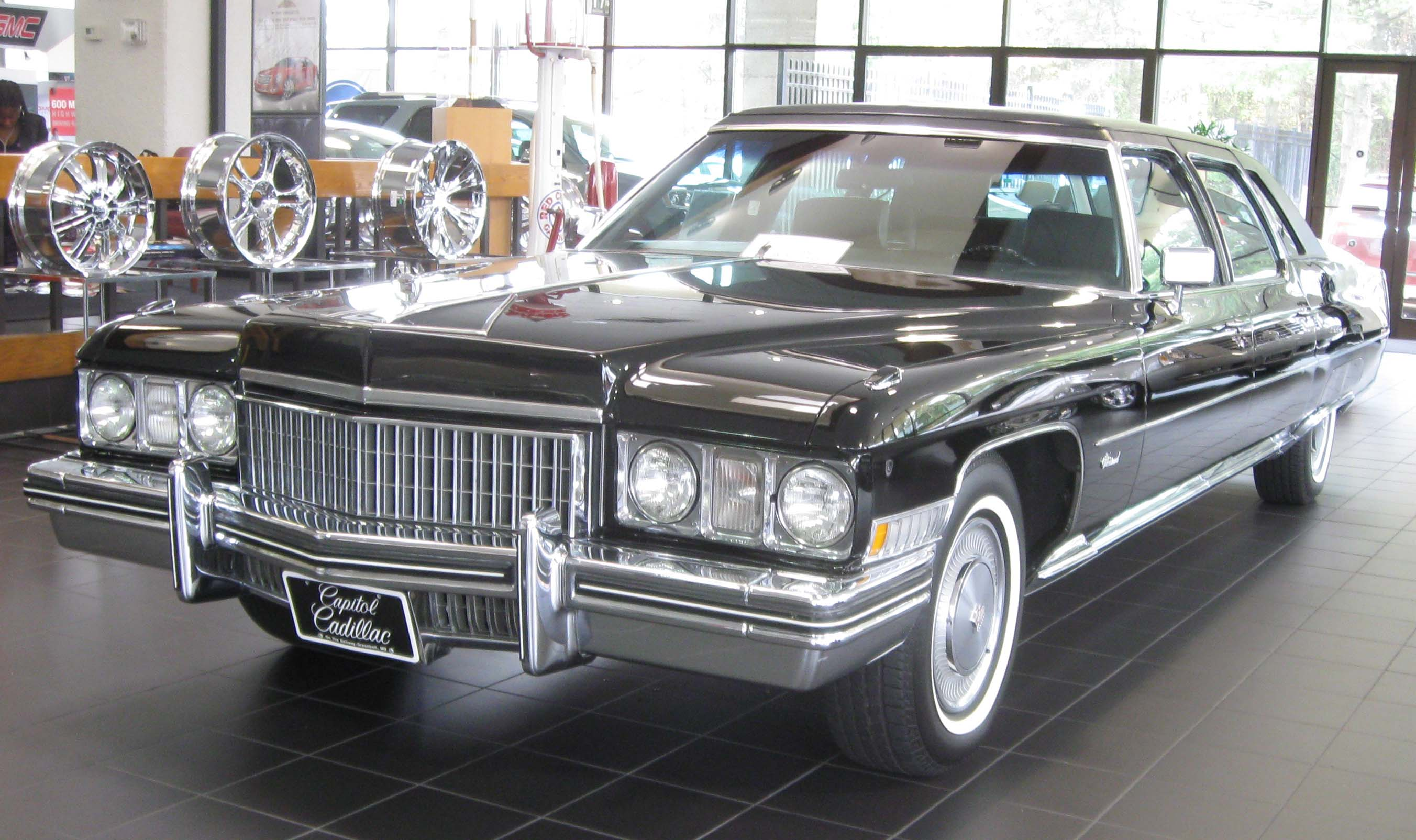
- 1973 Cadillac Fleetwood Seventy-Five

Overview
- Model years: 1971–1976
- Assembly: Detroit Assembly, Detroit, Michigan, U.S. Linden Assembly, Linden, New Jersey, U.S.
- Designer: Bill Mitchell

Body and chassis
- Layout: FR layout
- Platform: D-body

Powertrain
- Engine: 472 cu in (7.7 L) OHV V8; 500 cu in (8.2 L) OHV V8
- Transmission: 3-speed Turbo-Hydramatic 400 automatic

Dimensions
- Wheelbase: 151.5 in (3,848 mm); Commercial: 157.5 in (4,000 mm)
- Length: 1971: 247.3 in (6,281 mm); 1972: 248.9 in (6,322 mm); 1973: 250.0 in (6,350 mm); 1974–76: 252.2 in (6,406 mm)
- Width: 79.8 in (2,027 mm)
- Height: 56.8 in (1,443 mm)
- Curb weight: 5,500–6,100 lb (2,500–2,800 kg)

As with all GM full-size lines, the Series 75 was redesigned for 1971. The new GM full-size bodies, at 64.3 inches front shoulder room (62.1 inches on Cadillac) and 63.4 inches rear shoulder room (64.0 inches on Cadillac) set a record for interior width that would not be matched by any car until the full-size GM rear-wheel-drive models of the early to mid-1990s. Pairs of individually housed squarish headlamps were set wider apart. The V-shaped grille had an egg-crate style insert and was protected by massive vertical guards framing a rectangular license plate indentation. A wide hood with full-length wind splints, a prominent center crease and hidden windshield wipers was seen. A Cadillac wreath and crest decorated the nose and new indicator lamps appeared atop each front fender. A horizontal belt line molding ran from behind the front wheel housing, almost to the rear stopping where an elliptical bulge in the body came to a point and where thin rectangular side markers were placed above and below the chrome strip. The rear wheel openings were again covered with fender skirts. Long vertical taillights in chrome bezels were located at the end of the rear fenders . Long horizontal back-up lamps were set in the bumper, on either side of a deeply recessed license plate housing. Standard equipment included automatic level control; automatic climate control; rear window defogger; four rear ashtrays and manual right-hand outside rear-view mirror. A hand-fitted padded vinyl roof was available. The rear roof could be custom finished in several different ways including triangular "coach" windows or vinyl covered "blind quarter" looks. Ornamentation included the traditional Fleetwood laurel wreath crests and lettering. No rocker sill strips, panels or extension moldings were used. And, of course, the limousine had doors cut into the roof, special upholstery appointment and a driver's partition with adjustable division window.

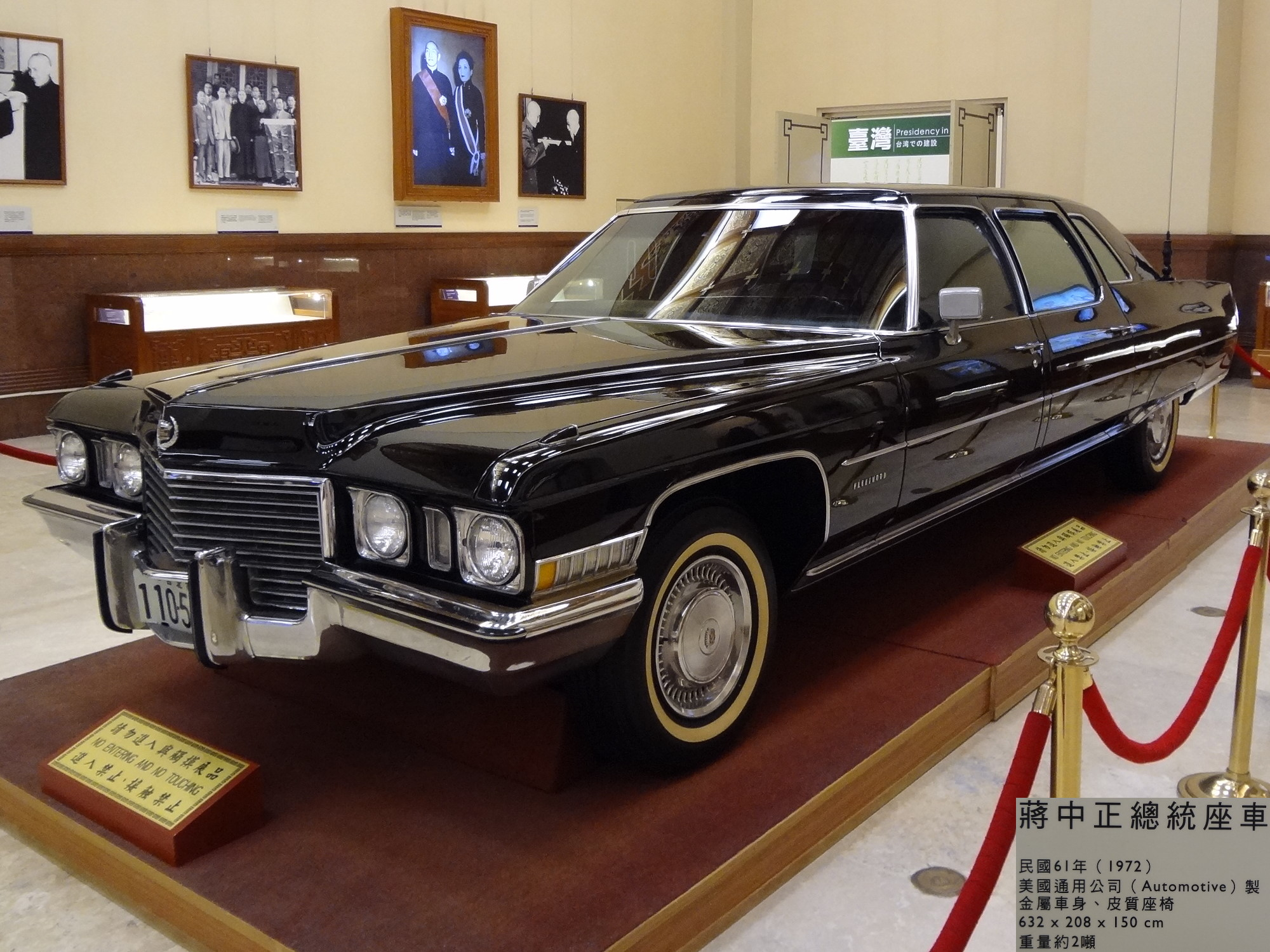
Chiang Kai-shek's 1972 Fleetwood Seventy-Five

In 1972, a modest frontal revision placed more emphasis on horizontal grille blades. The parking lamps were moved from the bumper to between the square beveled headlamps, which were now set wider apart. Standard equipment included automatic level control; carpeted foot rests; fixed-ratio power steering; remote control right-hand side outside rearview mirror; rear window defogger and automatic climate control. The sedan included folding auxiliary seats. The limousine had the doors cut into the roof and had the traditional partition and glass divider. Trim included bright body underscores with rear extensions; horizontal thin belt moldings; Fleetwood front fender lettering and laurel wreath badges for the hood and deck lid. Several optional roof treatments were available making these models true factory-built semi-custom-type vehicles.

New energy absorbing bumpers were seen on all GM cars in 1973 and it brought styling refinements to Series 75. Grilles were widened and had an intricate eggcrate design. Larger vertical rectangles housed the parking lamps between wide spaced headlamps which had square bezels but round lenses. Bumpers ran fully across the front and wrapped around each end. Vertical guards were spaced much further apart at a point outboard of the grille. The rear end had a bumper with a flatter upper section housing an angled license plate recess. Border outline moldings vertically "veed" paralleled the fender edge shape at the rear bodysides. Single horizontally mounted rectangular rear side marker lamps were placed over and under the rear tip of the thin beltline trim. Cadillac script was seen on the front fender sides below the belt molding behind the wheel opening. The long wheelbase, expensive Series 75's were immense automobiles with rounded corner side window treatments and rather large "coach windows" cut into the rear roof pillars. The Series 75 had a thin horizontal bodyside molding; front fender nameplates; full-length body underscores with rear extensions and Fleetwood-style wreath badge ornamentation. Standard equipment included carpeted foot rests; fixed ratio power steering; rear seat window defogger; automatic climate control and right outside rearview mirrors operated by remote control. Bumper impact strips were also standard.

In 1974, a wide eggcrate grille was used. Dual round headlamps were mounted close together in square bezels. Further outboard were double deck wraparound parking lamps. Shorter vertical grille guards appeared in about the same position as before. Rear fender sides were flatter without the elliptical bulge. The thin beltline molding was positioned lower by several inches. The rear end had vertical bumper ends with the sidemarker lights built in. New horizontal taillamps were placed beneath the trunk lid. Both bumpers, especially the rear, protruded further from the body. Inside, a new curved "space age" instrument panel housed a new quartz controlled digital clock. Standard equipment included automatic level control; carpeted footrests; fixed ratio power steering; rear seat window defogger; automatic climate control; trailering package and remote control right-hand outside rearview mirror. Black sidewall L78-15/D tires were standard. Also found on the Series 75 new gray and white bumper impact strips. Series script appeared on the front fenders, behind the wheel housings, and "coach" windows appeared at the rear roof pillar. Twilight Sentinel was now featured on all 75s at regular prices.

Styling changes for 1975 brought dual rectangular headlamps flanked by rectangular cornering lights wrapped around new, squared-off front fenders. A new cross hatched grille also appeared, with Cadillac script on the header. Both long wheelbase Series 75 came with two separate climate control systems; automatic leveling air shocks; folding jump seats; rear window defogger; trailering equipment and remote control right-hand outside rearview mirrors. The limousine had a leather front chauffeur's compartment and glass partition window. Script identification nameplates were worn on the front fenders, behind the wheel opening. Fleetwood decorative trim was seen. New triangular rear quarter window, of much slimmer design than before, were seen.

In 1976, the grille saw a new finer crosshatching pattern. Cornering lamps got new horizontal chrome trim while taillamps gained new chrome-like trim. New 'Fleetwood' nameplates with block lettering replaced the 'Fleetwood' script on the front fenders and trunk lid. A Controlled (limited-slip) Differential was included for extra traction. An optional illuminated entry and theft deterrence system was optional. A new Delco Freedom battery never needed water. New turbine vaned and wire wheel covers were offered. A new option locked the doors when the transmission lever was shifted to "Drive". Cadillac also offered Track Master, a computerized skid prevention system that automatically pumped the back brakes in an emergency situation to shorten stopping distance. New options included a push-button Weather Band built into the AM/FM stereo signal-seeking radio. Of the 15 standard and six optional Firemist body colors, 13 were new this year. The Series 75 remained the only American-built vehicle that was designed and built strictly as a limousine. Big 75's had two separate automatic climate control systems. Interior choices were Medici crushed velour fabric in black or dark blue, or Magnan Knit in light gray. Full-width folding seats held three extra passengers. Passengers could use the control panel to raise/lower windows, turn on reading lamps, operate radio, or (in limousines) raise/lower the central partition. There were large fixed quarter windows behind the rear doors. Electronic fuel injection was optional on the 500 cu in (8.2 L) OHV V8. A cross-grain padded vinyl roof was optional. Series 75 also had new graphite-treated rear brake linings, reinforced shoes, and Hydro-Boost power-brake booster. They also boasted four cigarette lighters rather than the usual two.

== 1977–1984 Fleetwood Limousine ==
Cadillac Fleetwood Limousine
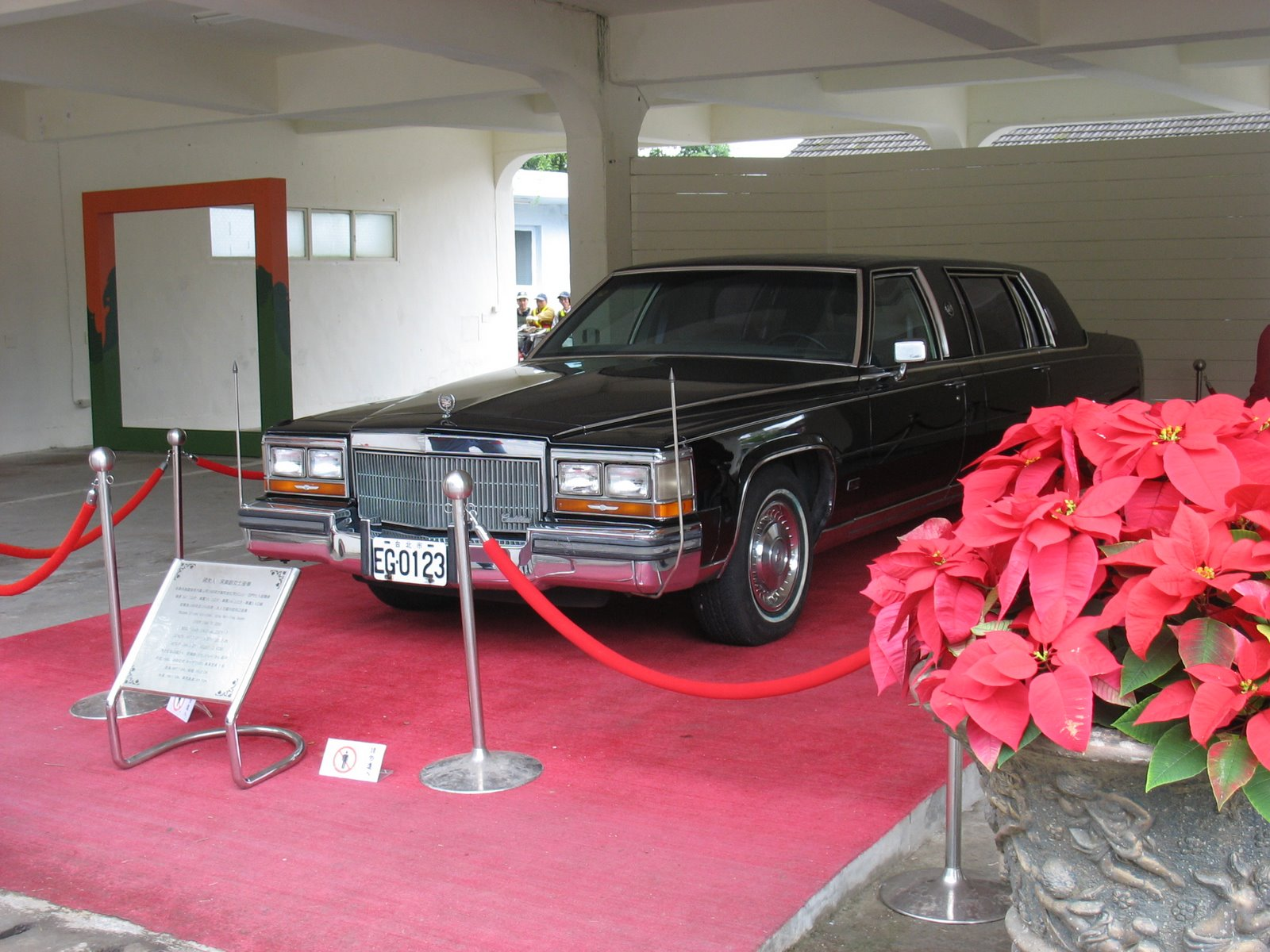
- A customised Cadillac limousine

Overview
- Model years: 1977–1984
- Assembly: Detroit Assembly, Detroit, Michigan, U.S. South Gate Assembly, South Gate, California, U.S. Linden Assembly, Linden, New Jersey, U.S.
- Designer: Bill Mitchell

Body and chassis
- Body style: 4-door limousine
- Platform: D-body

Powertrain
- Engine: 425 cu in (7.0 L) L33/L35 V8; 368 cu in (6.0 L) L62 V8
- Transmission: 3-speed TH-400 automatic 3-speed TH-350C

Dimensions
- Wheelbase: 144.5 in (3,670 mm)
- Length: 244.3 in (6,205 mm)
- Width: 75.2 in (1,910 mm)
- Height: 56.9 in (1,445 mm)
- Curb weight: 4,900–5,100 lb (2,200–2,300 kg)

In 1977, General Motors significantly downsized their full-sized cars in response to United States Federal CAFE standard legislation. The Series 75 designation was dropped by Cadillac in 1977. The 1977 Cadillac Fleetwood Limousine rode on a 144.5-inch wheelbase and was powered by a 425-cubic-inch (7.0 L) V8. This engine was basically a de-bored version of the 472/500 (7.7 L/8.2 L) V8 of previous years. Compared with the 1976 Cadillac Fleetwood 75 which it replaced, the Cadillac Fleetwood Limousine had a wheelbase 7.0 inches shorter and weighed about 900 lb (340 kg) less.

The 425 cu in (7.0 L) engine, a reduced bore 472, was further decreased in bore for 1980–1981 to 368 cubic inches or 6.0 liters. For 1981, the 368 was provided with a modulated displacement system designed by Eaton Corporation, controlled by a digital computer, which locked off intake and exhaust valves to two or four of the eight cylinders, thus running effectively as a V6 or V4 under light load conditions where in third gear, and over 35 mph (56 km/h). This engine was called the "V8-6-4". While the 368-cubic-inch engine itself was durable, the complex electronics and sensors for the V8-6-4 system proved troublesome, and, except for limousines, was dropped after 1981. The engine's controls and sensors were inefficient for the computer technology of the era.

Both the 425 and 368 are small-bore versions of the durable and efficient 472 (which was introduced in late 1967 for the '68 model year). The larger 500 had the 472's bore but a longer stroke. This engine family was the last Cadillac cast-iron engine, and the last 'big-block' manufactured by the division.

== 1985–1987 ==
Eleventh generation
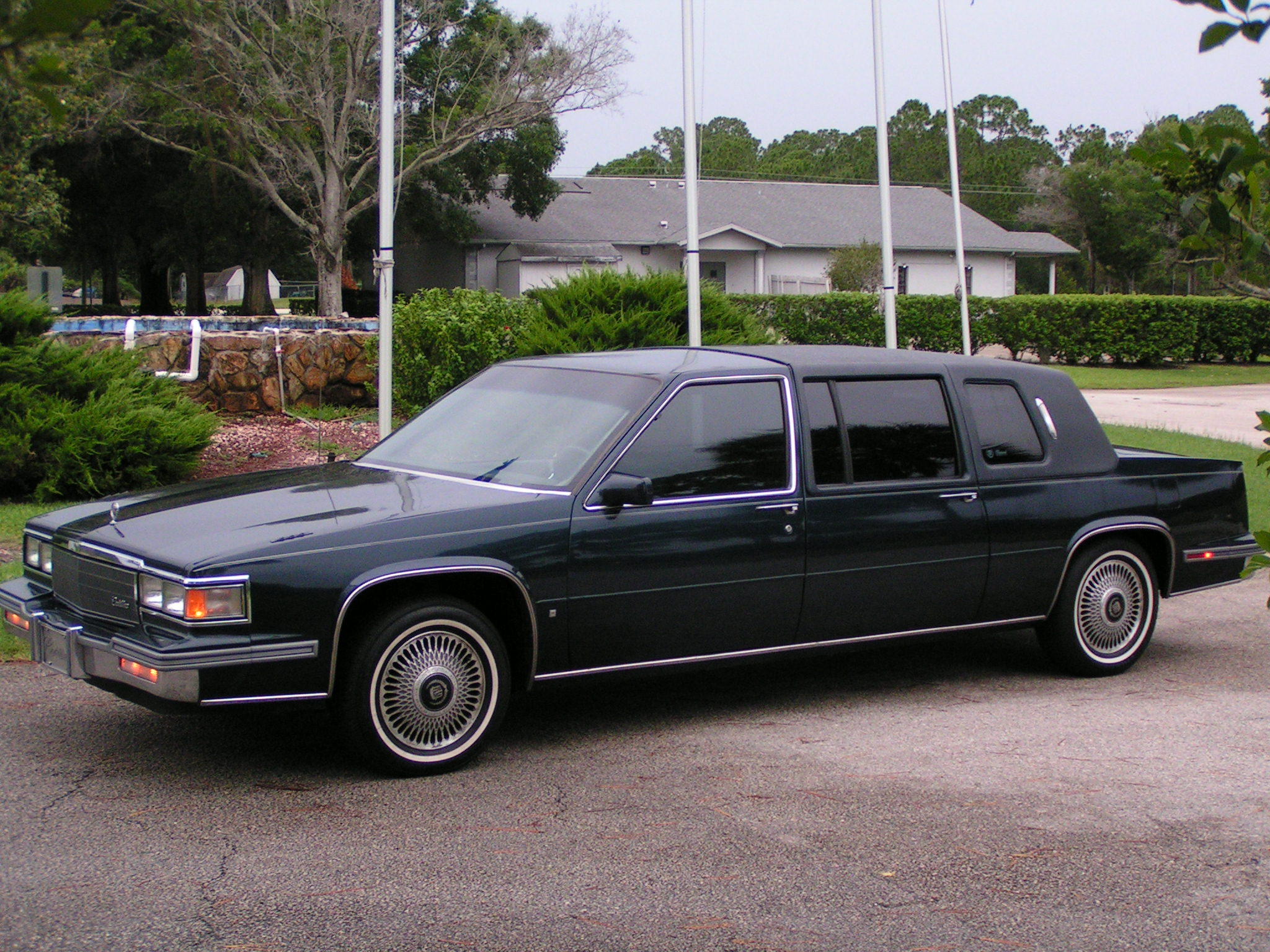
- 1986 Fleetwood 75 (shown in Commodore Blue)

Overview
- Model years: 1985–1987 (limited on-demand production to 1992)
- Assembly: Madison Heights, Michigan
- Designer: Irv Rybicki

Body and chassis
- Body style: 4-door limousine
- Layout: FF layout
- Platform: C-body

Powertrain
- Engine: 249 cu in (4.1 L) HT-4100 V8
- Transmission: 4-speed TH-440-T4 automatic 4-speed 4T60 automatic

Dimensions
- Wheelbase: 134.4 in (3,414 mm)
- Length: 1985–86: 218.6 in (5,552 mm); 1987: 220.0 in (5,588 mm)
- Width: 71.7 in (1,821 mm)
- Height: 55.0 in (1,397 mm)
- Curb weight: 3,700–4,000 lb (1,700–1,800 kg)

In 1985, Cadillac revived the Series 75 designation. A new front wheel drive General Motors C-body unibody platform was introduced in 1985 and Cadillac briefly shifted to this platform, stretched by 23.6 in (599 mm) to a wheelbase of 134.4 in (3,414 mm). Even so, the modern front drive edition was more than two feet shorter than the old rear-wheel drive version and weighed 1,200 pounds less, and naturally, also much narrower. The aluminum 249 cu in (4.1 L) HT-4100 V8 was used to power the last generation of Series 75. The transmission was a four-speed automatic. Unlike previous generations, the limousines were not built from the ground up, but created from Coupe DeVilles from the Orion plant rather than sedans with extra doors added in the process of stretching the wheelbase from the normal 110.8 in (2,814 mm) to 134.4 in (3,414 mm). They were built by Hess & Eisenhardt at a plant in Madison Heights, Michigan. Rear control panels let passengers lock or unlock doors, operate power windows, adjust climate, and control the stereo unit. Additionally, pushbuttons in the rear panels allowed backseat passengers to unlatch the rear doors electrically. Initially, just the standard eight-passenger limousine was available, but later in the model year, a seven-passenger formal limousine was offered featuring a partition with sliding glass between the front and rear compartments, and a secondary (trunk-mounted) climate control unit. Series 75 limousines had power operated mirrors and specific "Fleetwood" style seating patterns. Aluminum alloy wheels were standard on all 75s. In June 1985, Cadillac general manager and General Motors vice president John O. Grettenberger called the all-new Fleetwood 75 limousine "one of the most significant vehicle development achievements in the 83 year history of the Cadillac Motor Car Division."

Only minor equipment changes arrived for 1986, including the previously optional electronic instrument cluster was now standard equipment, and an armrest-mounted cellular telephone with overhead microphone became available. Cherry grain replaced the former walnut grain on instrument panel and door trim appliques. Automatic door locking prevented the doors from opening with the limousine in gear.

The Cadillac Fleetwood 75 Limousine was available in eight colors (two enamels, four metallics, and two extra-cost colors). Exterior colors included Cotillion White, Sable Black, Platinum Metallic, Academy Gray Metallic, Gossamer Blue Metallic, Commodore Blue Metallic, Corinthian Blue Firemist, and Black Cherry Pearlmist. Tuxedo Grain vinyl roof covering was available in six matching colors for all shades (including Black Cherry Pearlmist), except for Gossamer Blue and Corinthian Blue, which were equipped with the Dark Blue (the same color used for the Commodore Blue models) vinyl roof. Standard-equipment single-color exterior accent stripes were available in nine colors, including White, Dark Gray, Black, Light Blue, Medium Mauve, Dark Blue, Gold, Red, and Dark Claret. Interior colors were upholstered in Black, Gray, and Dark Blue – in Royal Prima Cloth or optional Leather. The front compartment of the Formal Limousine (with the divider window) was upholstered in Black Leather regardless of the color or material selected for the rear compartment.

Both the front and rear styling of the limousine and formal limousine was revised for 1987. A new grille, header moldings and composite headlights with wraparound bezel and cornering lamps were used. Rear styling now featured elongated quarter extensions against which the taillamps, bumper and bumper trim fascia fit flush. Also new was grooved six-inch wide rocker molding made of stainless steel/aluminum composite with a single-rib accent groove. For 1987, new hydro-elastic engine mounts were used to further isolate powertrain vibration.

In 1987, the Cadillac Fleetwood Sixty Special was reintroduced in limited production to fill non-limousine demands. Cadillac dropped production of the Fleetwood 75 limousine that year, though limousines continued to be built by Hess & Eisenhardt and offered until 1992 by special order only.
