= Cadillac Series 61 =

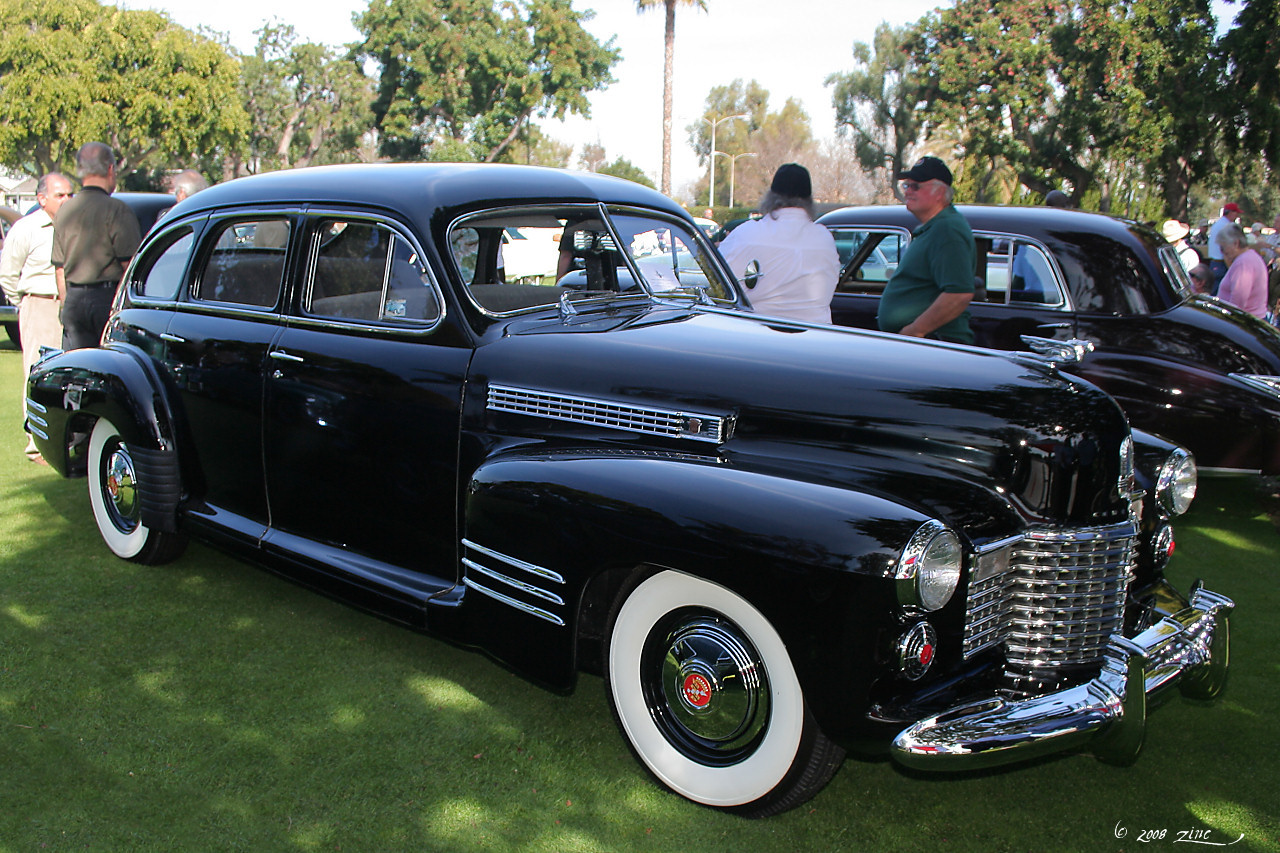
- 1941 Cadillac Series 61 sedan

Overview
- Manufacturer: Cadillac (General Motors)
- Production: 1939–1951
- Assembly: Detroit, Michigan, U.S.
- Designer: Harley Earl

Body and chassis
- Class: Fullsize luxury car
- Layout: FR layout

Chronology
- Predecessor: Cadillac Series 60; Cadillac Series 65
- Successor: Cadillac Series 62

The Cadillac Series 61 was Cadillac's mainstream product model range. It was priced and equipped more modestly below the limousine, GM D platform Cadillac Series 85, Cadillac Series 90, Cadillac Series 72, Cadillac Series 67, and Cadillac Fleetwood Series 75. It was upgraded to the Series 62 in 1940 only to return to production in model year 1941, replacing the cancelled LaSalle Series 50. While production was suspended from model years 1943–1945 due to World War II, it remained as the junior level product line until 1951. The size, equipment list and quality level were the most popular with buyers who wanted a prestigious luxury car that was usually driven by the owner, while the longer cars were chauffeur driven. It combined the most popular features of the previous Series 60 and Series 65 and was priced at the same level as Buick products of the time.

== 1939, 1941 (not offered 1940) ==
First Generation
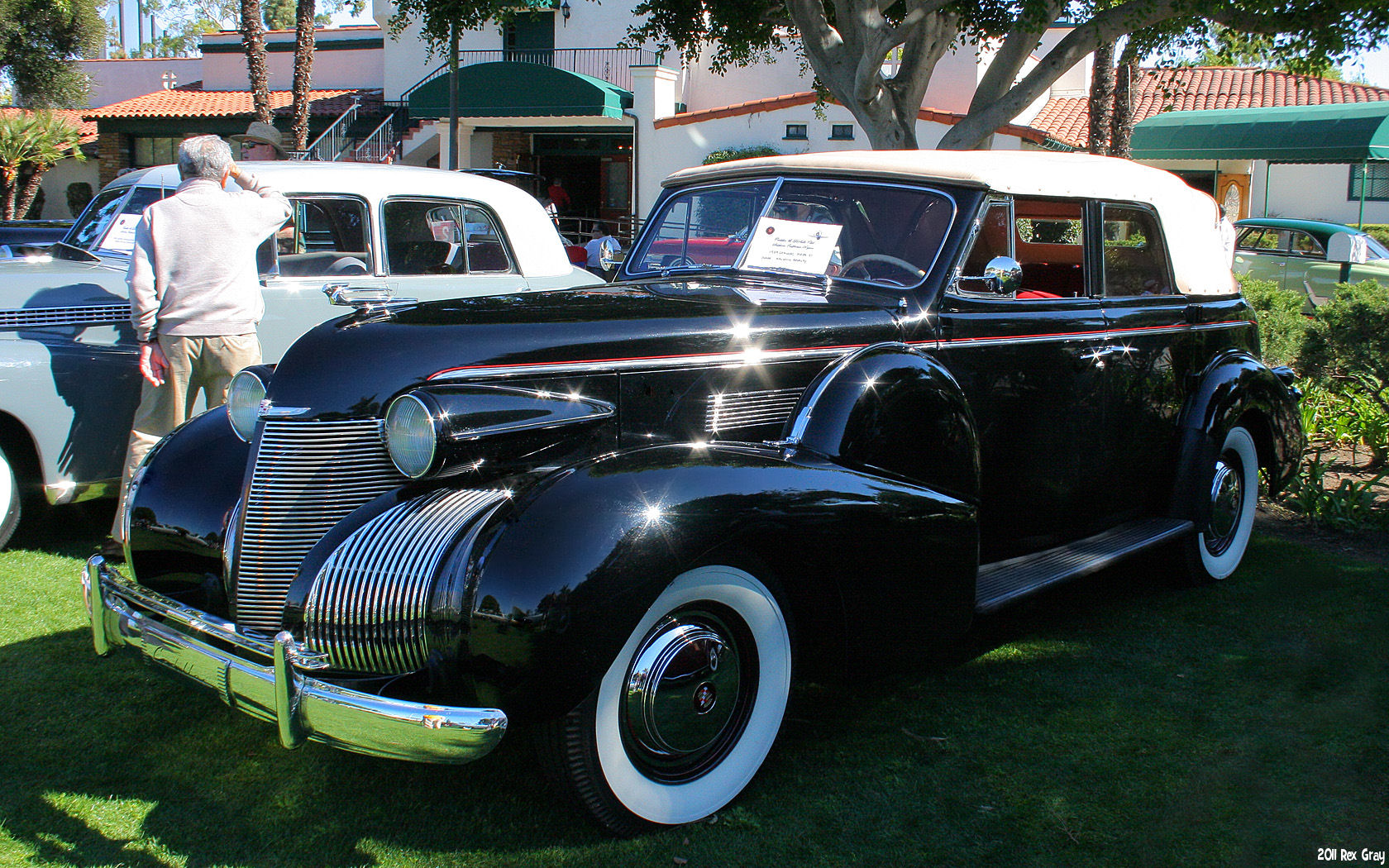
- 1939 Cadillac Series 61 convertible sedan style 39-6129

Overview
- Model years: 1939, 1941

Body and chassis
- Body style: 2-door club coupe 2-door convertible 4-door sedan 4-door convertible
- Platform: B-body
- Related: LaSalle Series 50; Buick Century; Oldsmobile Series 70; Pontiac Streamliner Torpedo

Powertrain
- Engine: 346 cu in (5.7 L) L-head V8
- Transmission: 3-speed manual w/Hill-holder; 4-speed Hydra-Matic (1941)

Dimensions
- Wheelbase: 126 in (3,200 mm)
- Length: 207.25 in (5,264 mm)

The 1939 Fisher-bodied Series 61 used a 126 in (3,200 mm) wheelbase. All GM vehicles for 1939 adopted the Torpedo appearance with an extended, protruding bow appearance to enhance its aerodynamic appearance. A number of modern ocean liners had been recently launched and the appearance was very popular at the time. 1939 was also the year of the 1939 New York World's Fair and the streamline appearance gave a futuristic look when it was on display at the Futurama exhibit. The protruding center grille and the functional side grilles were die-cast, with slender bars. Single die-cast louvers were positioned to the rear of each hood side panel for engine compartment ventilation.

It was available as a club coupe, convertible or sedan, and a manual retracting center divider made from safety glass was optional on the sedan, along with the choice to add or remove running boards. A new exterior featured concealed door hinges, and exotic sea shell horns were available. All Series Sixty Special and Series 61's shared the same 346 in³ L-head V8 in 1939, with power at 135 hp (101 kW) and rising to 150 hp (112 kW) for 1941. Prices were the most affordable for Cadillac products with the 2-passenger coupe starting at US$1,695 ($39,232 in 2025 dollars), the Touring Sedan was listed at US$1,805 ($41,778 in 2025 dollars) and the 5-passenger Convertible Sedan was listed at US$2,265 ($52,426 in 2025 dollars).

When the LaSalle product line was cancelled, production was suspended at the LaSalle Factory at Wyoming Road and the facility closed.

In 1941, the Series 61 returned to complement the Series 62 which was introduced in 1940, and the Series 61 replaced the LaSalle in the Cadillac pricing structure. All 1941 Cadillacs used the same Monobloc V8 with the same displacement of 346 cu in (5.7 L) when the Cadillac V16 engine used in the Series 90 was cancelled. The most notable technical advancement was the introduction of the Hydramatic automatic transmission as a US$125 option ($2,736 in 2025 dollars) which brought the listed price to US$1,535 ($33,600 in 2025 dollars) for the Deluxe Sedan. In 1941, the one piece hood came down lower in the front, included the side panels and extended sideways to the fenders. A single rectangular panel of louver trim was used on each side of the hood. The rectangular grille was wide, vertical, and bulged forward in the middle. Rectangular parking lights were built into the top outer corners of the grille. Headlights were now built into the nose of the fenders, and provision for built in accessory fog lights was provided under the headlights. Three chrome spears appeared on the rear section of all four fenders. Rear fender skirts were standard.

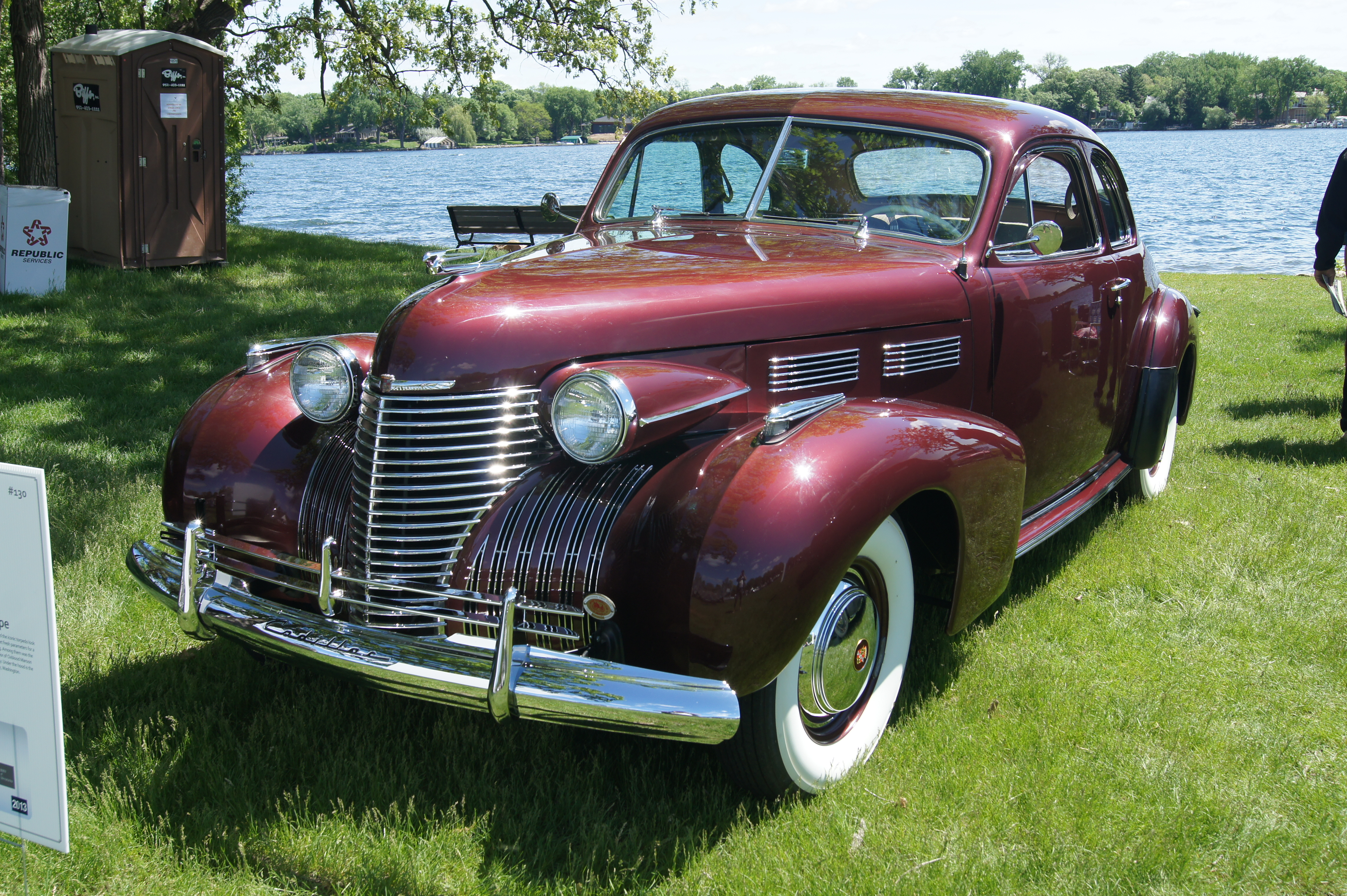
1940 Cadillac Series 61

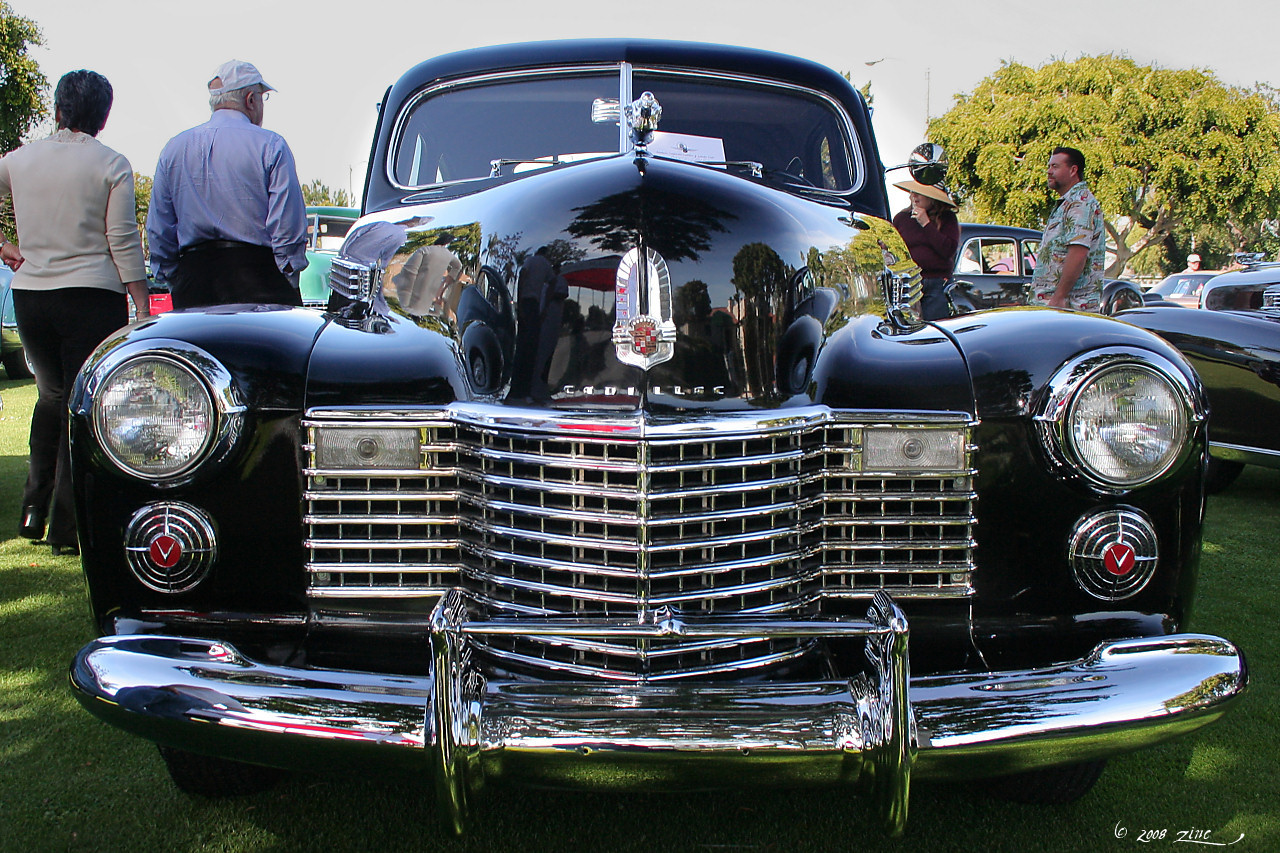
1941 Cadillac grille

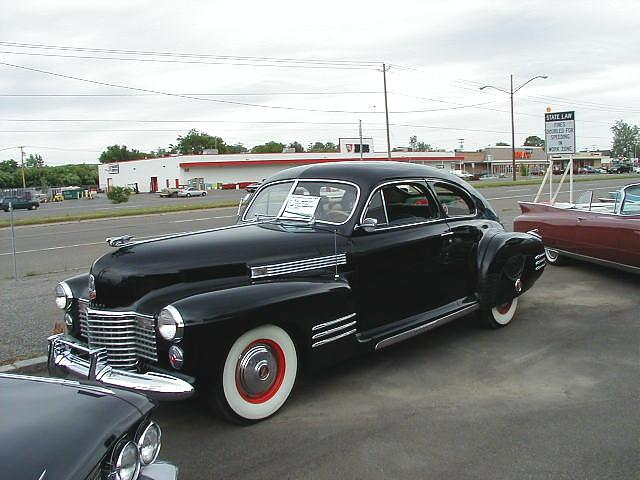
1941 Cadillac Series 61 five passenger coupe

== Series 63 ==
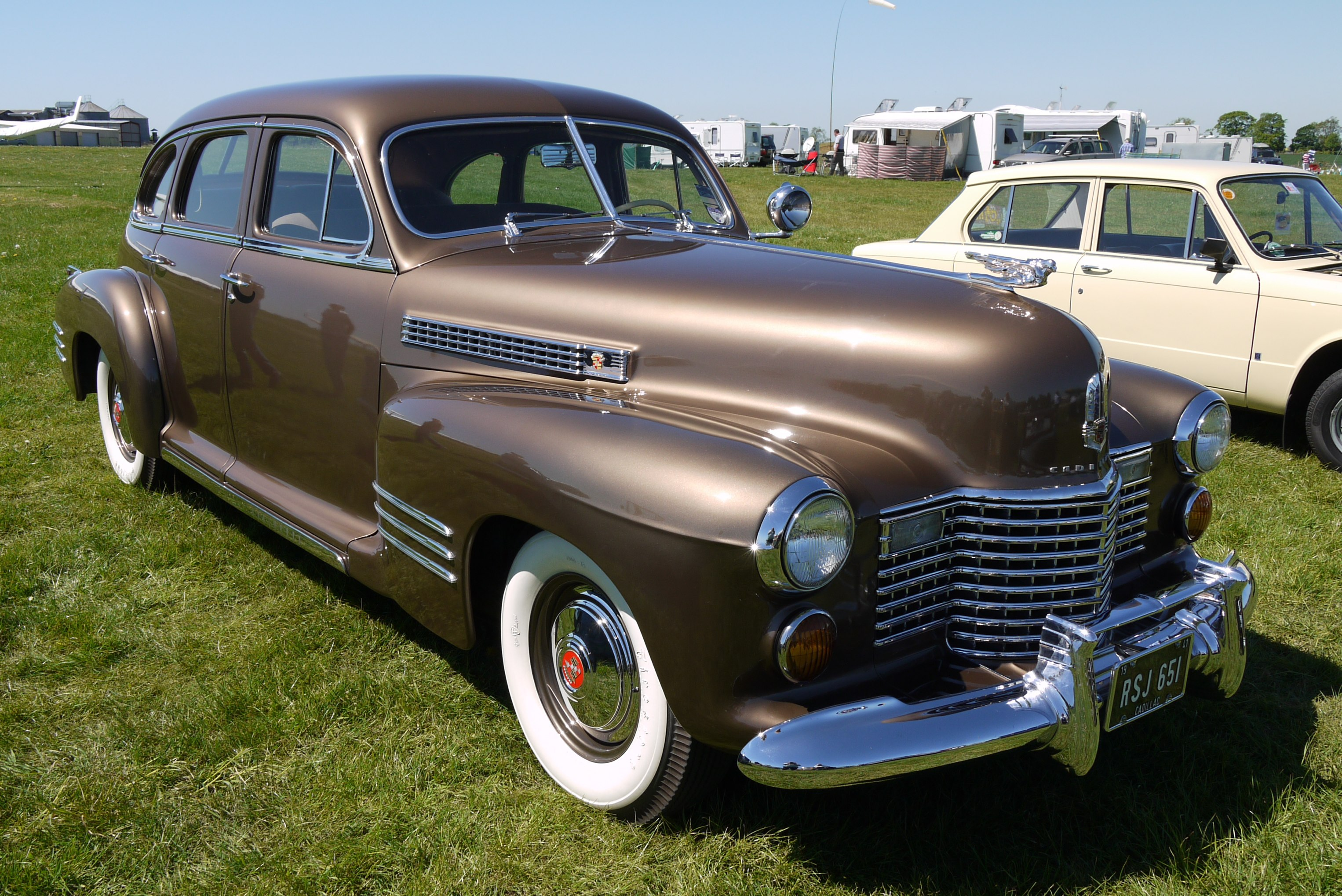
1941 Cadillac Series 63 touring sedan

The Series 63 was a sedan only for 1941 and 1942. It was only offered with a 126-inch wheelbase shared with the Series 61 and Series 62 but had a six-window B-body shared with the fastback Series 61. The main difference with the Series 63 was the different trunk (not a fastback) and the list price of US$1,695 ($37,102 in 2025 dollars) which meant the optional equipment and appearance features on the Series 61 were standard on the Series 63.

By the time the decision was made to drop the LaSalle for 1941, at least three wood and metal mockups had been made for potential LaSalle models. One was based on the notchback GM C platform which ended up being shared by the Cadillac Series 62, Buick Roadmaster and Super, the Oldsmobile 98 and the Pontiac Custom Torpedo. A second was based on the fastback GM B platform which ended up being shared by the Cadillac Series 61, the Buick Century and Special, the Oldsmobile 70 and the Pontiac Streamliner Torpedo. A third was a modified notchback design, derived from the fastback B-body, but described as "A-body-like", that ended up being used by the Cadillac Series 63.

Any or all of these could have ended up being part of the next LaSalle line. However, it has been inferred that of the three, the third design was most likely to have been a LaSalle, with that platform being assigned exclusively to LaSalle, and that the second design, whose platform was shared with the Series 61, was the next most likely. Sales of the Series 63 were 5,030 in 1941 and 1,750 in 1942 before production was suspended February 4, 1942 to contribute to the war effort.

== 1942–1947 ==
Third Generation
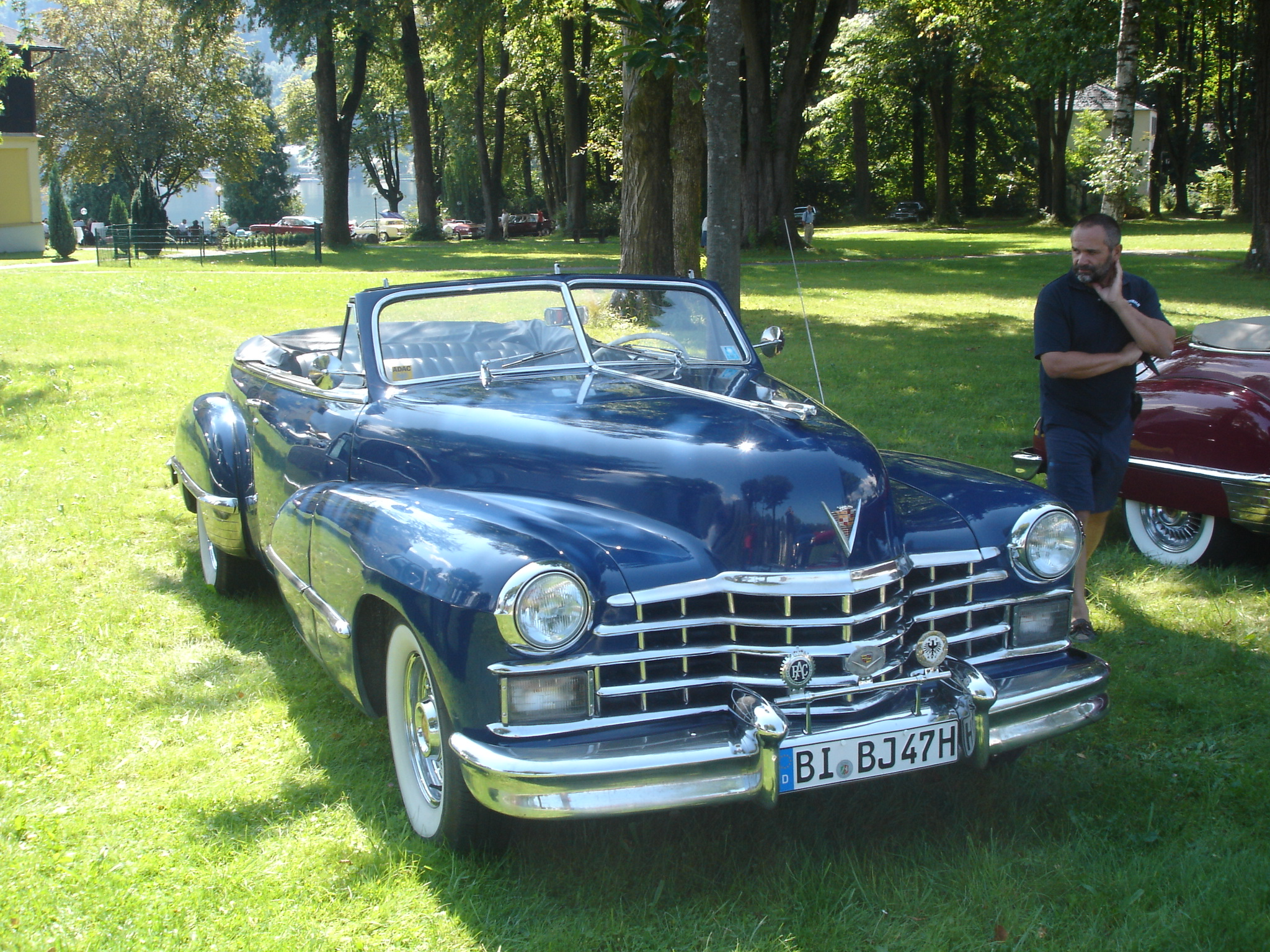

Overview
- Model years: 1942–1947

Body and chassis
- Body style: 2-door club coupe 2-door convertible 4-door sedan
- Platform: B-body
- Related: Buick Special; Oldsmobile Series 70; Pontiac Streamliner

Powertrain
- Engine: 346 cu in L-head V8
- Transmission: 3-speed manual w/Hill-holder; 4-speed Hydra-Matic

Dimensions
- Wheelbase: 126 in (3,200 mm)
- Length: 215 in (5,461 mm)
- Curb weight: 4,390 lb (1,990 kg)

Model year 1942 saw a dramatic appearance change on all GM vehicles, where the curve of the front fenders extended halfway across the front doors, called "Airfoil" and fastback appearance was adopted company-wide. Vehicles that were built until February 1942 could be identified as lacking chrome trim starting in January when it was prohibited due to wartime production and trim pieces including bumpers were painted. After the War, the Series 61 returned on a 126 in (3,200 mm) wheelbase. The engine remained the same 346 in³ L-head V8 as before. The grille became more massive in 1942, with even fewer bars and was the beginning of the traditional "egg crate" appearance that all future products adopted. Parking lights became round and fog light sockets became rectangular and were included in the grille area. A bullet shape appeared on the tops of the bumper guards. Fenders were rounded and longer. Front fenders extended into the front doors. The new fenders had heavy moldings along the sides. A new fresh air ventilating system with air ducts leading from the grille replaced cowl ventilators at the base of the windshield. Handbrake control was changed from lever to tee-shaped pull handle. Radiator shutter control of engine temperature was replaced by a blocking type thermostat in the water return fitting in the radiator.

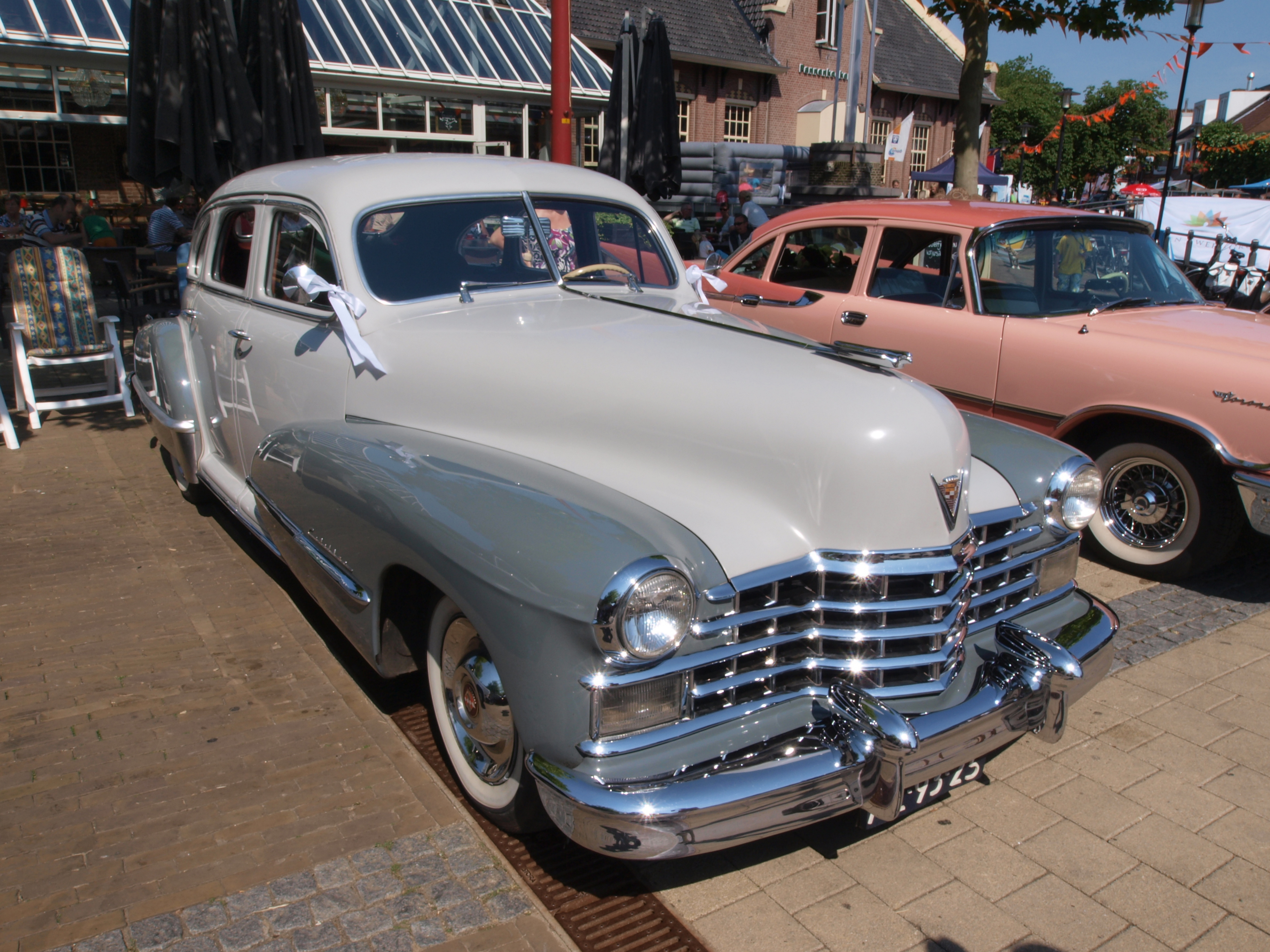
1947 Cadillac Series 61

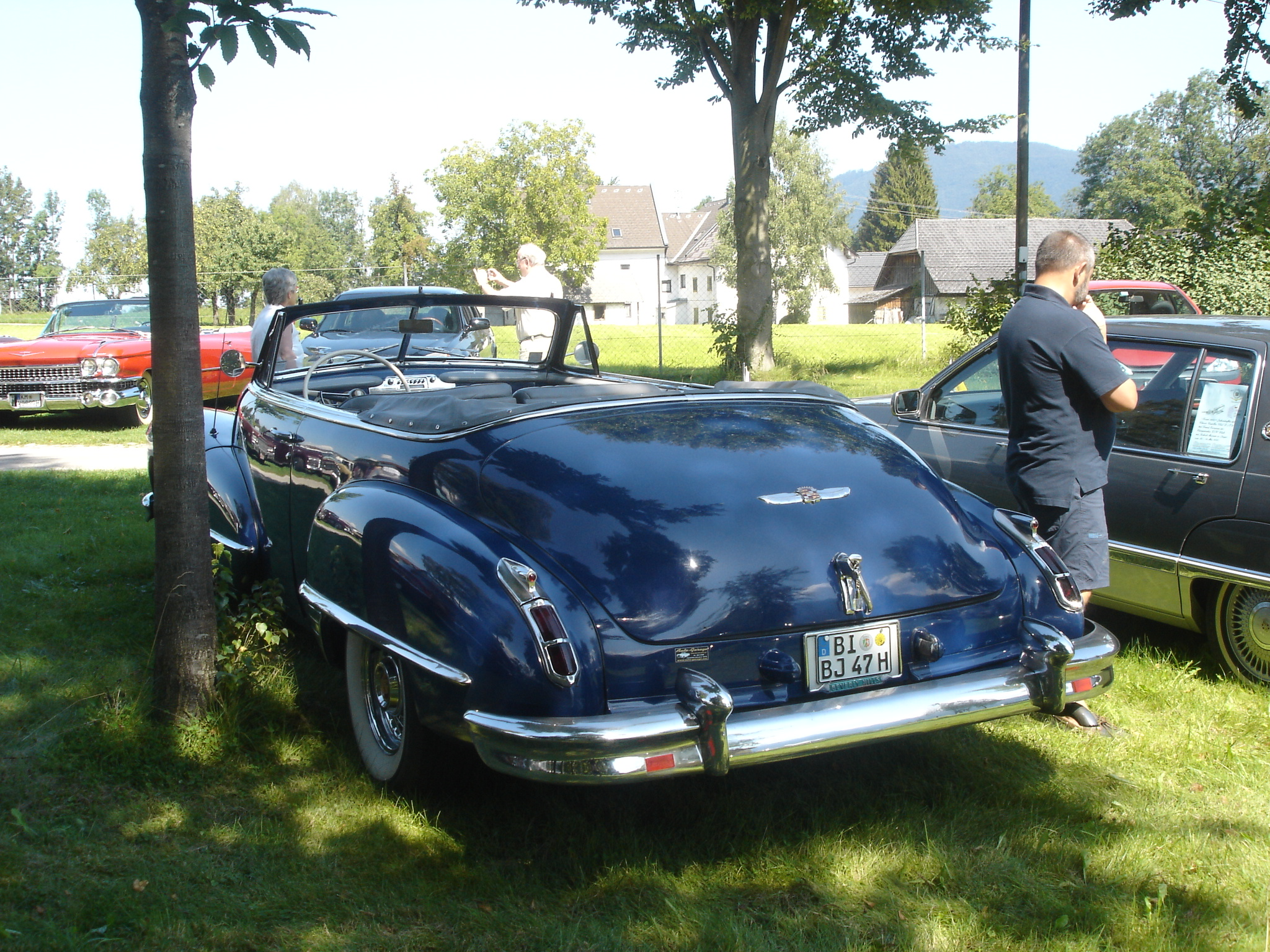
1947 Cadillac Series 61 convertible rear

== 1948–1951 ==
Fourth Generation
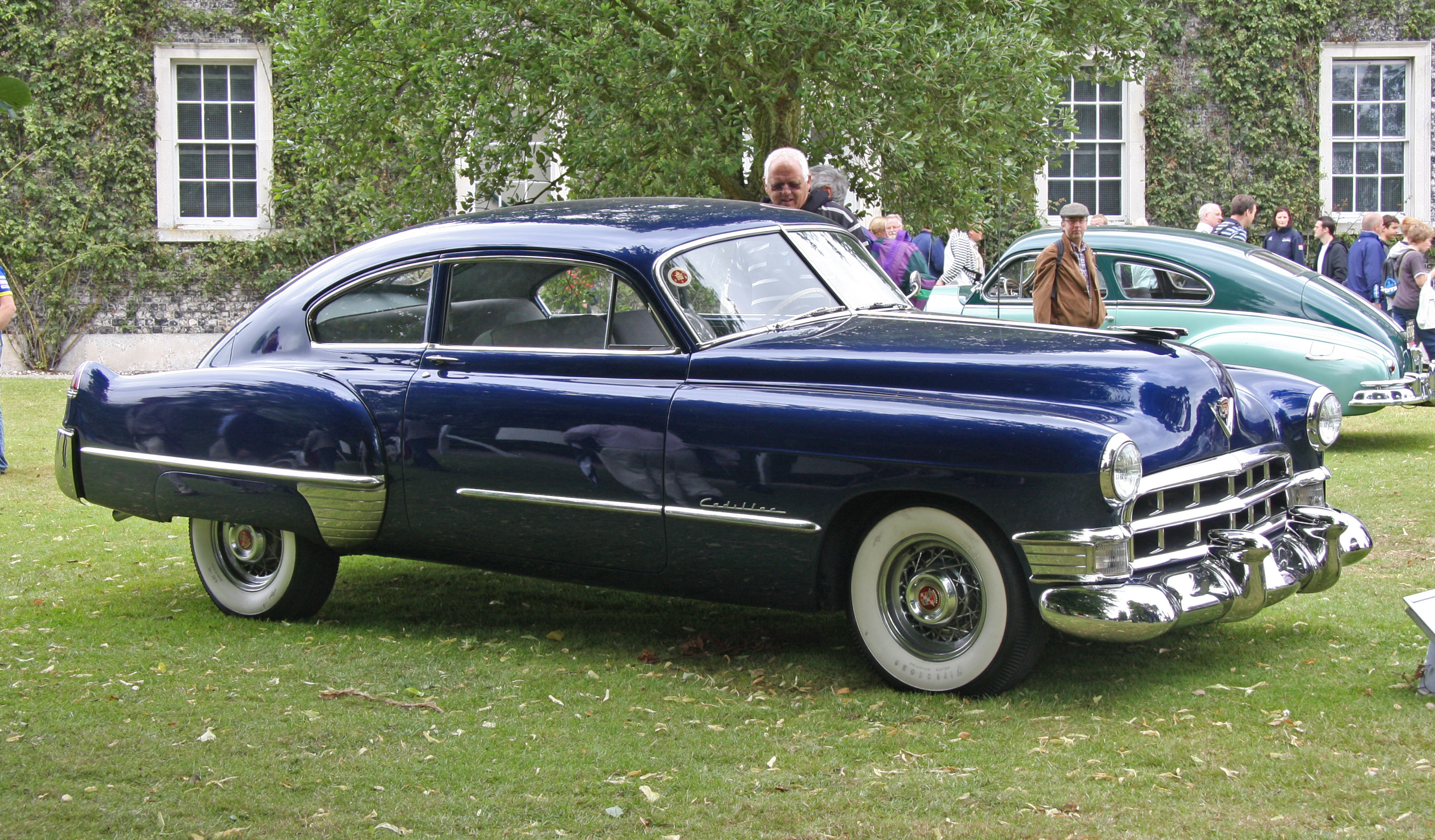

Overview
- Model years: 1948–1951

Body and chassis
- Body style: 2-door coupe 4-door sedan
- Platform: 1948–49: C-body; 1950–51: B-body
- Related: Cadillac Series 62; Buick Roadmaster; Buick Super; Buick Estate; Buick Special; Oldsmobile 88; Oldsmobile Series 70; Oldsmobile 98; Pontiac Streamliner

Powertrain
- Engine: 346 cu in (5.7 L) Monobloc V8; 331 cu in (5.4 L) OHV V8
- Transmission: 3-speed synchromesh manual 4-speed Hydramatic

Dimensions
- Wheelbase: 1948–49: 126.0 in (3,200 mm); 1950–51: 122.0 in (3,099 mm)
- Length: 1948–49: 214.0 in (5,436 mm); 1950–51: 211.8 in (5,380 mm)
- Width: 1948: 79.0 in (2,007 mm); 1949: 78.9 in (2,004 mm); 1950–1951: 80.1 in (2,035 mm)
- Height: 62.7 in (1,593 mm)
- Curb weight: 4,000–4,400 lb (1,800–2,000 kg)

The formerly-smaller Series 61 was moved to the Series 62's General Motors C-Body platform, making them very similar. Major design changes marked the C-bodied Cadillacs for 1948. They featured General Motors first all-new postwar body with styling advances including tailfins inspired by the Lockheed P-38 fighter plane. There was also an attractive eggcrate grille, which was higher in the middle than on the sides. The front of the car was protected by a heavier and more massive bumper bar that curved around the fenders. The Cadillac crest was centered low in a "V" above the radiator grille. Chrome headlamp rims were used. Cars in the 61 series lacked bright metal front fender shields and under-taillight trim. A new dashboard with "rainbow" style instrument cluster and leather grained panels extending to the carpets was seen only this year.

The big news at Cadillac in 1949 centered on engineering, with the release of a new overhead valve V8 engine. This 331 in³ engine produced 160 hp (119 kW). Only minor appearance changes were seen. They included a more massive grille treatment with grooved extension panels housing the front parking lights and chevron slashes below the taillamps on the coupes. Once again the cars in this line lacked front fender gravel shields and rocker panel moldings and had plainer interior trim. A larger luggage compartment lid was seen on all sedans except early production units. Standard equipment now included twin back-up lamps mounted on the deck lid latch panel.

Cadillacs had extensive styling changes in 1950, as its appearance is similar to cross-town rival Chrysler Imperial and the Chrysler New Yorker initially in 1949, and less so with yearly appearance changes. They looked generally heavier and had low sleek contours with longer rear decks, more sweeping front fenders and a broken rear fender line. The hood protruded more at front and was underlined by a more massive eggcrate grille. Round parking lights were used, but as in the past, when buyers chose fog lamps an additional bulb and larger housing were used. This setup combined the fog lamps and the directional signals. One piece windshields were introduced and the leading edge of the rear fenders which had a broken-off look, was highlighted by chrome imitation air slots. The rear fenders were longer and ended in a swooping tailfin design. The Cadillac script again appeared on the sides of the front fenders, but was now positioned closer to the front door opening gap. As far as Series 61 models went a big styling change was a return to marketing this line on the shorter wheelbase B-body than used on the Series 62. This led to some styling differences. For example, the Series 61 Sedan had no rear window ventipanes and featured a rear wraparound backlight. An identifying feature on both models was the absence of rocker panel moldings and rear quarter panel chrome underscores. The Series 61 was 4 inches shorter than in the previous season.

A minor face lift and small trim variations were the main Cadillac styling news in 1951. Miniature eggcrate grilles were set into the outboard grille extension panels below the headlights. Larger, bullet shaped bumper guards were used. The features list included handbrake, warning lamp; key start ignition; steering column cover; Delco-Remy generator; knee-action front suspension; directionals; mechanical fuel pump; dual downdraft carburetor; slipper-type pistons; rubber engine mounts; oversize brakes; Super Cushion tires; one-piece windshield; intake silencer; 160-hp engine; oil bath air cleaner; equalized manifolding; automatic choke and luxury appointments. On the dashboard "idiot lights" were used to monitor oil pressure and electrical charge rate instead of gauges. The smaller body was once again used on the 61s and again identified by the lack of chrome underscores. However a new medallion appeared on the rear roof pillar of the Series 61, above the upper beltline molding.

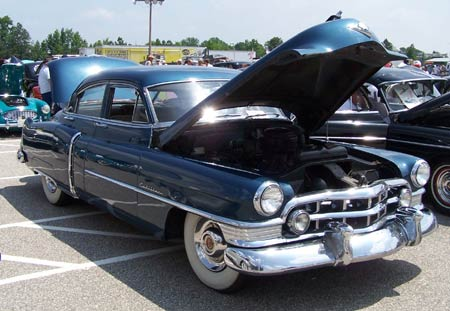
1950 Cadillac Series 51 Sedan.jpg

== Racing ==
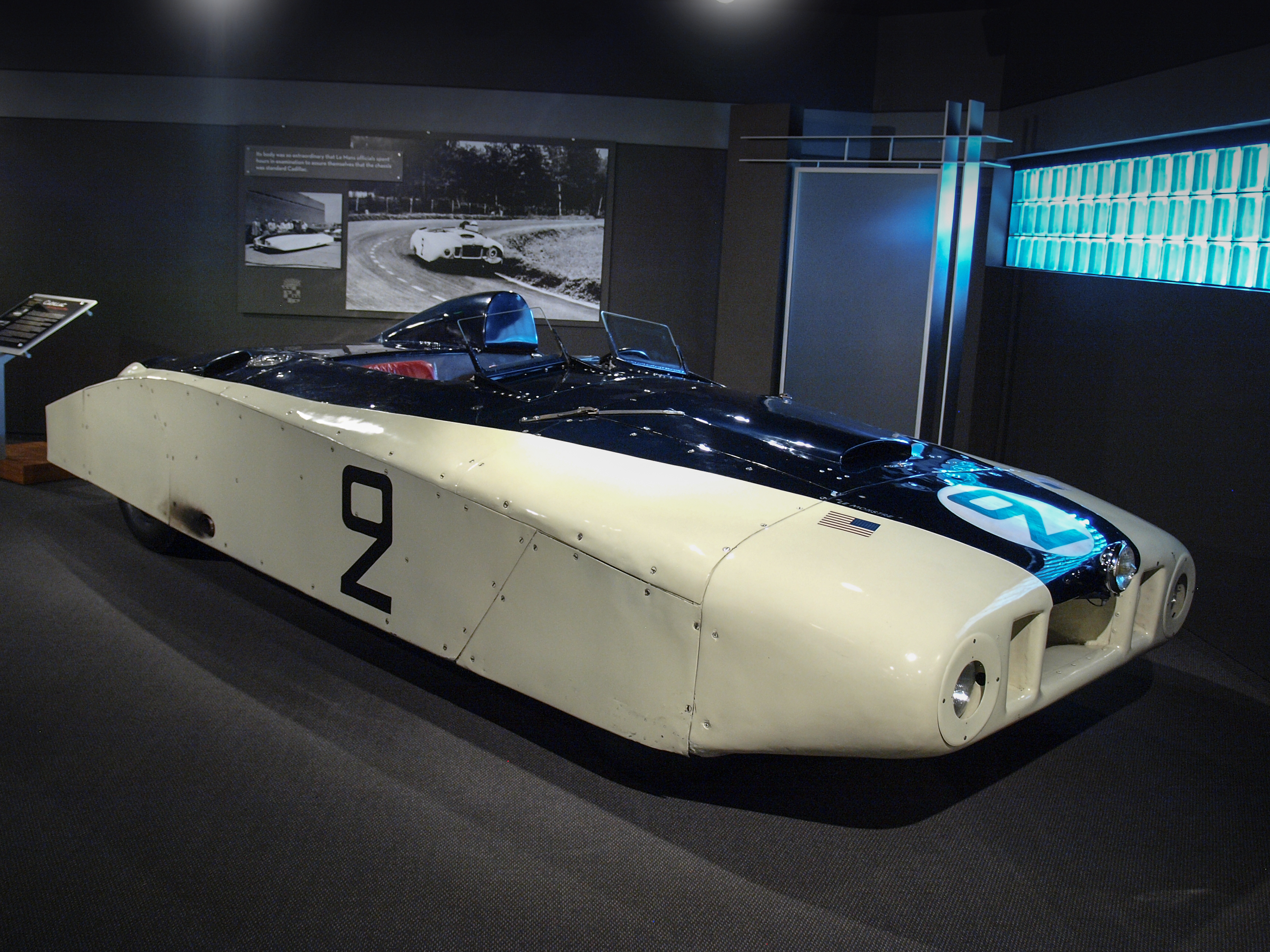
"Le Monstre" of the 1950 Le Mans 24h

Briggs Cunningham and his team brought 2 Series 61 DeVilles to the 1950 24 Hours of Le Mans. One of the cars, dubbed "Le Monstre", was modified for racing. The other, ‘’Petit Petaud (Small puppy)’’, was essentially stock with some minor modifications. The stock coupe finished 10th overall while the modified car finished 11th because Cunningham got stuck in the sand for 30 minutes.

== Film use ==
A 1939 convertible Cadillac Series 61 was used in the Batman film serial of 1943 to represent the Batmobile.

Featured in the 1946 movie The Chase
