= Cadillac Series 60 =

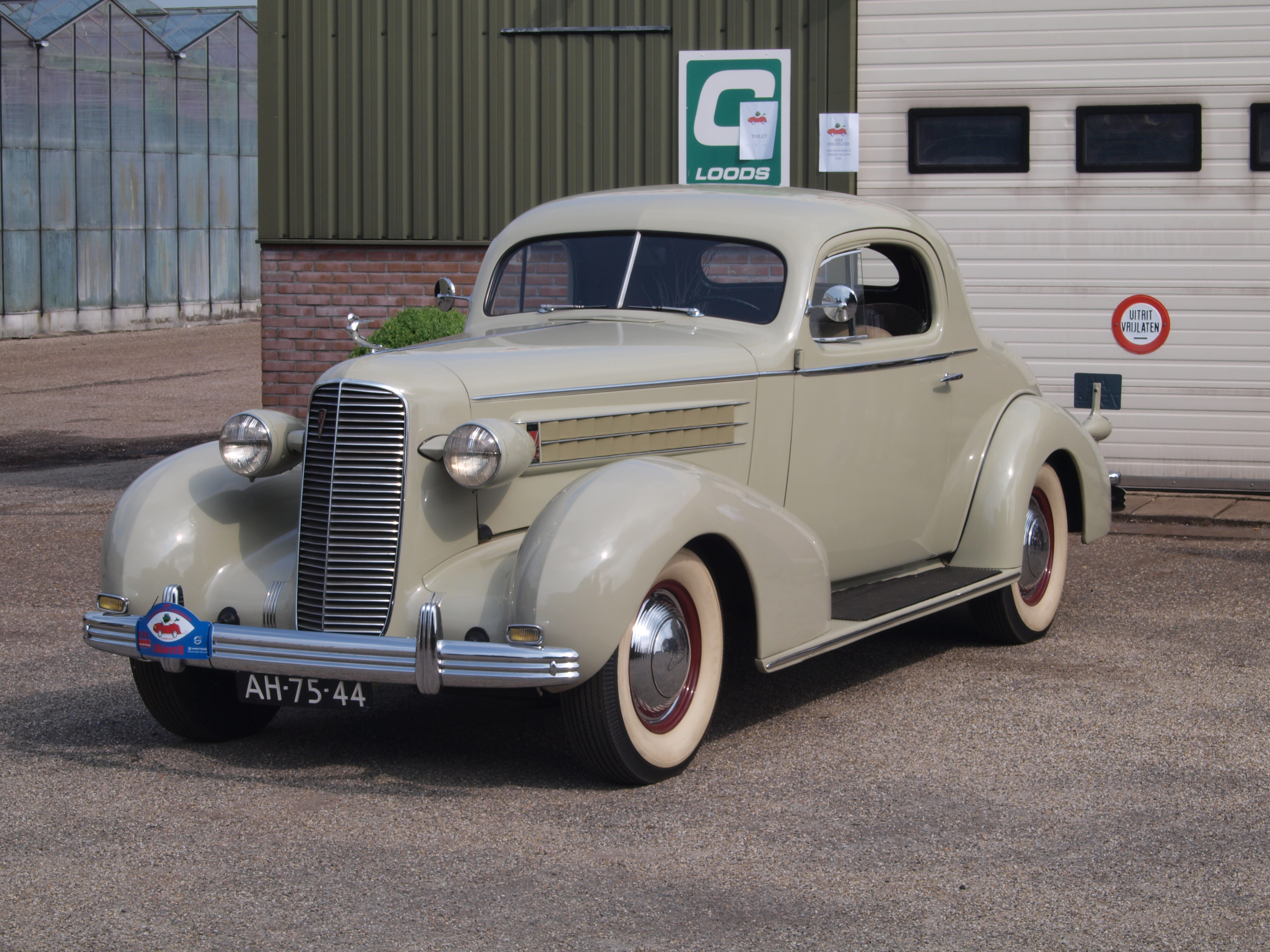

Overview
- Manufacturer: Cadillac (General Motors)
- Model years: 1936–1938
- Assembly: Detroit Assembly, Detroit, Michigan

Body and chassis
- Class: Fullsize luxury car
- Body style: 2-door club coupe 2-door convertible 4-door sedan 4-door convertible
- Layout: FR layout
- Platform: B-body
- Related: Buick Century; Buick Special; Cadillac Series 65; LaSalle Series 50; Oldsmobile L-Series

Powertrain
- Engine: 322 cu in L-head; 346 cu in L-head
- Transmission: 3-speed manual

Dimensions
- Wheelbase: 121.0 in (3,073 mm); 124.0 in (3,150 mm)
- Length: 204.3 in (5,189 mm)

Chronology
- Successor: Cadillac Series 61

The Cadillac Series 36-60 was Cadillac's entry-level product in the luxury vehicle market when it appeared in 1936, competing with the entry-level Packard Six. Each model year added the year prefix to the series (37-60 and 38-60) in the number hierarchy used at the time. It was replaced by the Series 39-61 in 1939, but a model that was derived from it, the Sixty Special or 60S, continued on and off through 1993.

== History ==
The Series 60 was the brainchild of new Cadillac manager Nicholas Dreystadt. Debuting in 1936, it filled a gaping price gap between the updated appearance of the successful LaSalles, of which the Series 60 was the upgraded version with the "Cadillac" name, and the Series 36-70 Cadillac models. Initially it rode on a 121.0 in (3,073 mm) wheelbase and shared the B body with cars from LaSalle, Buick, and Oldsmobile. This went up to 124.0 in (3,150 mm) in 1937–1938.

The exterior featured a new Harley Earl–designed look with a tall, slender grille and split vee-shaped windshield. This body used Fisher Body's new Turret Top one-piece roof and Bendix dual-servo brakes. "Knee-Action" independent suspension, first introduced by Cadillac in 1934, was a welcome novelty for the mid-price market at the time.

Under the hood was the new (less expensive) Monobloc V8. This 322 cu in (5.3 L) engine produced 125 hp (93 kW), just 10 less than that in the larger Cadillacs. The Series 60 immediately became the company's best-selling model, making up half of all Cadillacs sold the first year.

The next year, displacement on all Monobloc Cadillacs was 346 cu in (5.7 L). This new engine produced 135 hp (101 kW), more than all V8 Cadillacs of just a few years earlier. The Series 60 was upgraded to the Series 61.

== Gallery ==
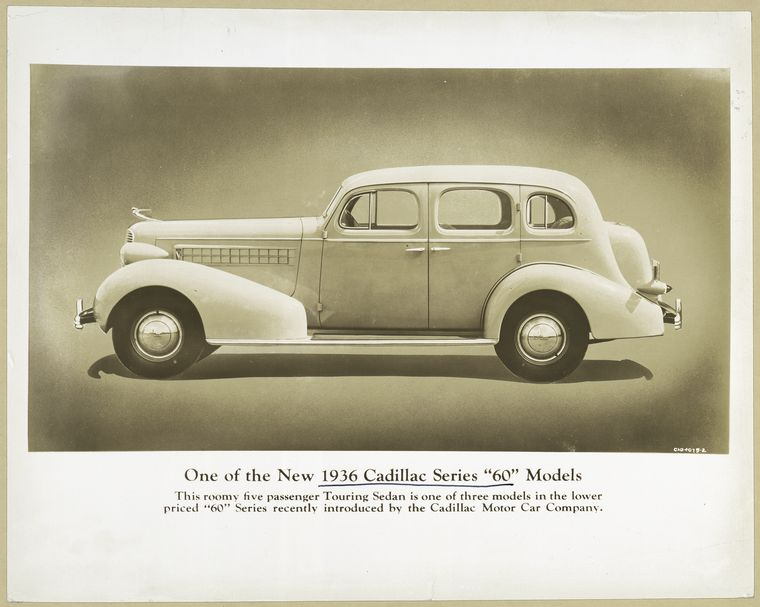
1936 Cadillac Series 60

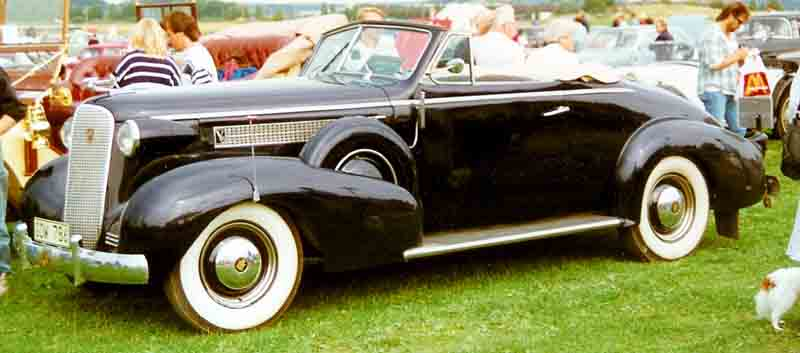
1937 Cadillac Series 60 convertible coupe

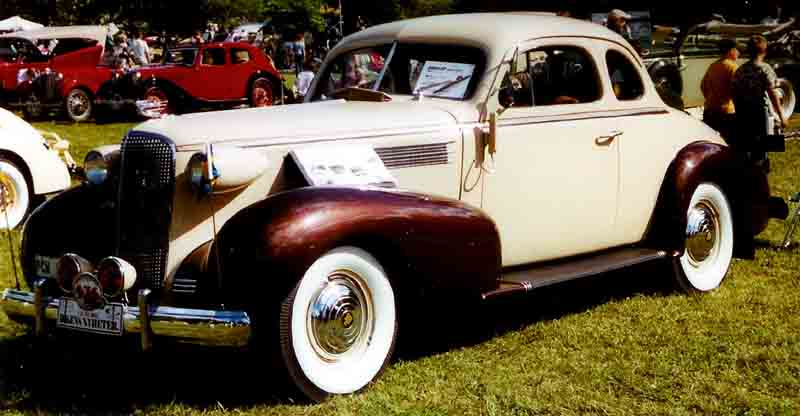
Cadillac Series 37-6027 Sport Coupé 1937

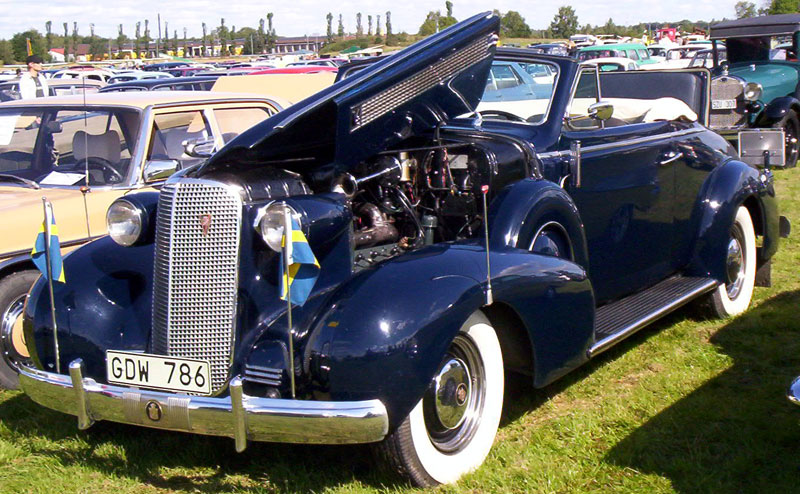
1937 Cadillac Series 60 2-door convertible

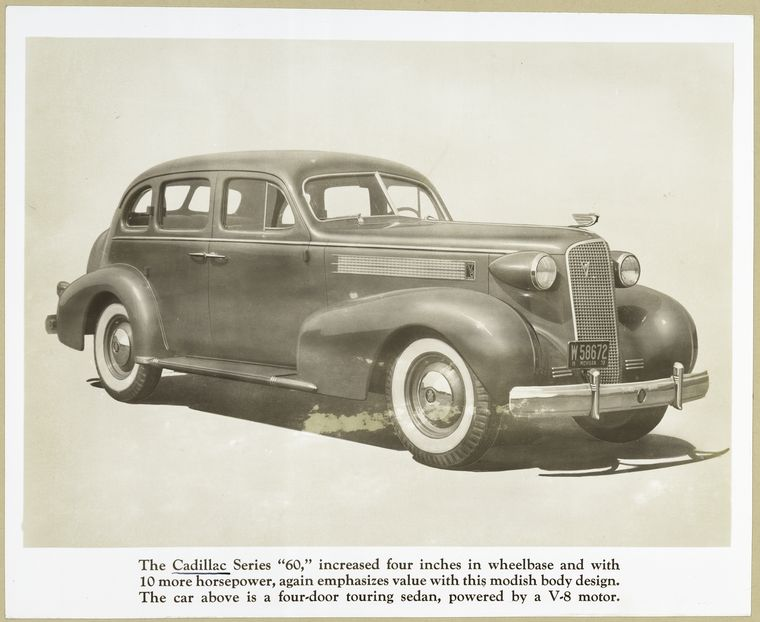
1937 Cadillac Series 60

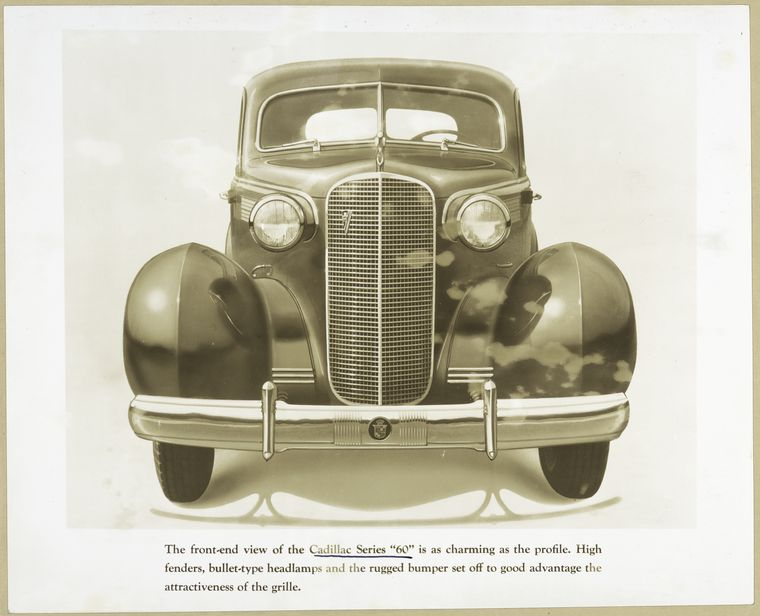
1937 Cadillac Series 60

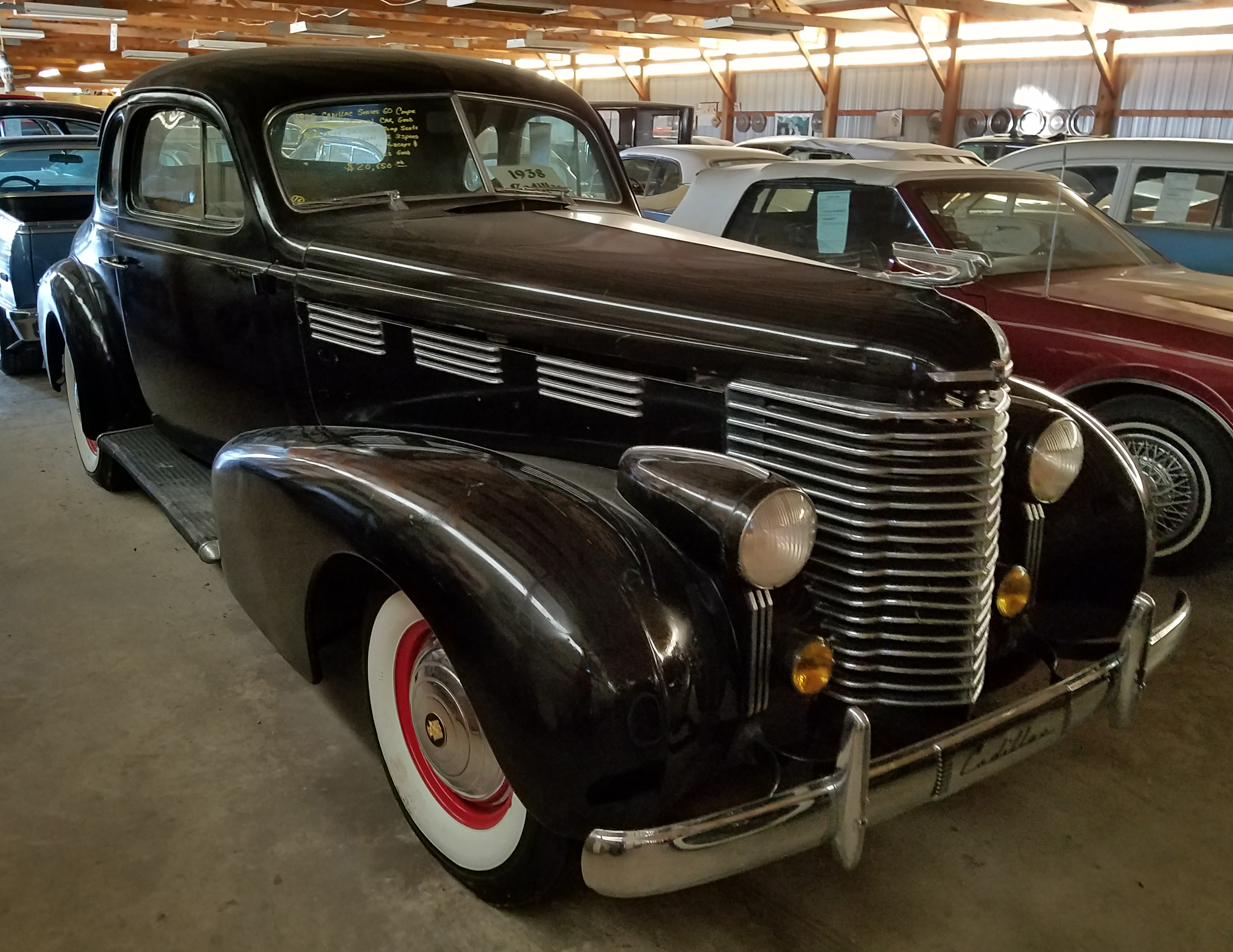
1938 Cadillac Series 60 Coupé
