= Cadillac V8 engine =

V8 engine
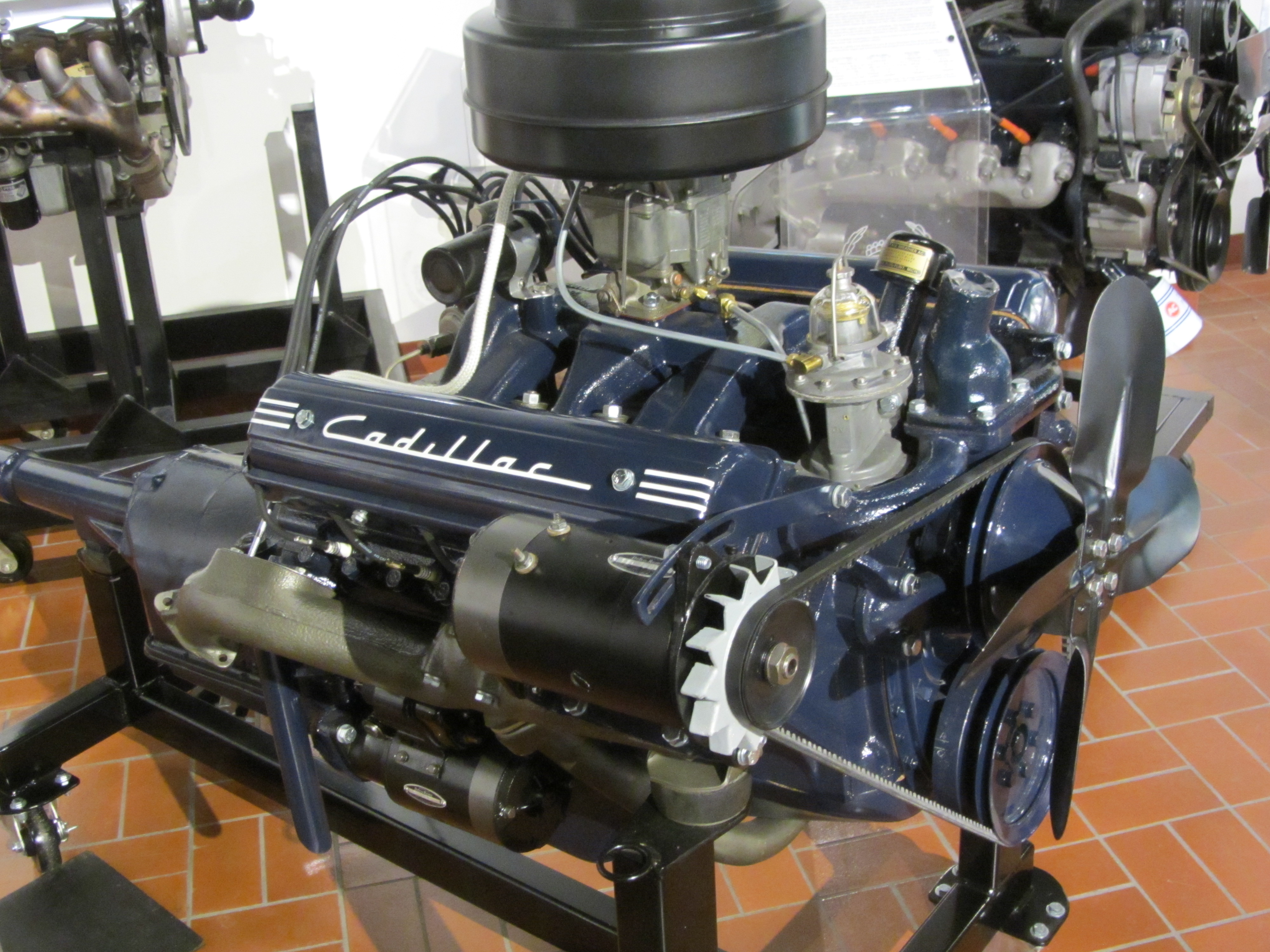
- A 331 series V8 from the 1950s

Overview
- Manufacturer: Cadillac (General Motors)
- Also called: Type 51, Monobloc, LaSalle, Northstar, Blackwing
- Production: 1914–present

Layout
- Configuration: 90° V8
- Displacement: 244 cu in (4.0 L); 267 cu in (4.4 L); 279 cu in (4.6 L); 307 cu in (5.0 L); 314 cu in (5.1 L); 322 cu in (5.3 L); 331 cu in (5.4 L); 346 cu in (5.7 L); 350 cu in (5.7 L); 353 cu in (5.8 L); 365 cu in (6.0 L); 368 cu in (6.0 L); 376 cu in (6.2 L); 390 cu in (6.4 L); 425 cu in (7.0 L); 429 cu in (7.0 L); 472 cu in (7.7 L); 500 cu in (8.2 L)
- Cylinder bore: 3.125 in (79.4 mm); 3.375 in (85.7 mm); 3.38 in (85.9 mm); 3.5 in (88.9 mm); 3.8 in (96.5 mm); 4 in (101.6 mm); 4.082 in (103.7 mm); 4.125 in (104.8 mm); 4.3 in (109.2 mm)
- Piston stroke: 3.875 in (98.4 mm); 4 in (101.6 mm); 4.06 in (103.1 mm); 4.304 in (109.3 mm); 4.5 in (114.3 mm); 4.94 in (125.5 mm); 5.125 in (130.2 mm)
- Cylinder block material: Cast iron Aluminium
- Cylinder head material: Cast iron Aluminium
- Valvetrain: L-head; OHV 2 valves × cyl.; DOHC 4 valves × cyl.
- Compression ratio: 8.5:1, 10.0:1, 10.5:1

Combustion
- Supercharger: With intercooler (in 4.4 L and 6.2 L LSA engines)
- Turbocharger: Twin-turbo (in 4.2 L engine)
- Fuel system: Rochester Quadrajet 4-barrel carburetor; Bendix Electronic FI; Throttle-body fuel injection; Digital fuel injection
- Fuel type: Gasoline
- Cooling system: Water-cooled

Output
- Power output: 70–550 hp (52–410 kW)
- Torque output: 265–640 lb⋅ft (359–868 N⋅m)

Dimensions
- Dry weight: 595 lb (270 kg)

The term Cadillac V8 may refer to any of a number of V8 engines produced by the Cadillac division of General Motors since it pioneered the first such mass-produced engine in 1914.

Most commonly, such a reference is to one of the manufacturer's most successful, best known, or longest-lived 90° V8 engine series. These include the pioneering overhead valve 331 cu in (5.4 L) cu in introduced in 1949, made in three displacements up to 390 cu in (6.4 L); a 390 cu in (6.4 L) introduced in 1963 that grew to 429 cu in (7.0 L); and a 472 cu in (7.7 L) introduced in 1968 and enlarged to 500 cu in (8.2 L). Also notable was the Northstar, which debuted in 1992 as a 4.6 litre, and was also produced in 4.4 L and 4.2 L versions.

When the Northstar engine series ended production in 2010, it became the last General Motors division to retain its own proprietary V8 design. This changed when Cadillac created the twin-turbo "Blackwing" engine in 2019.

== L-head ==
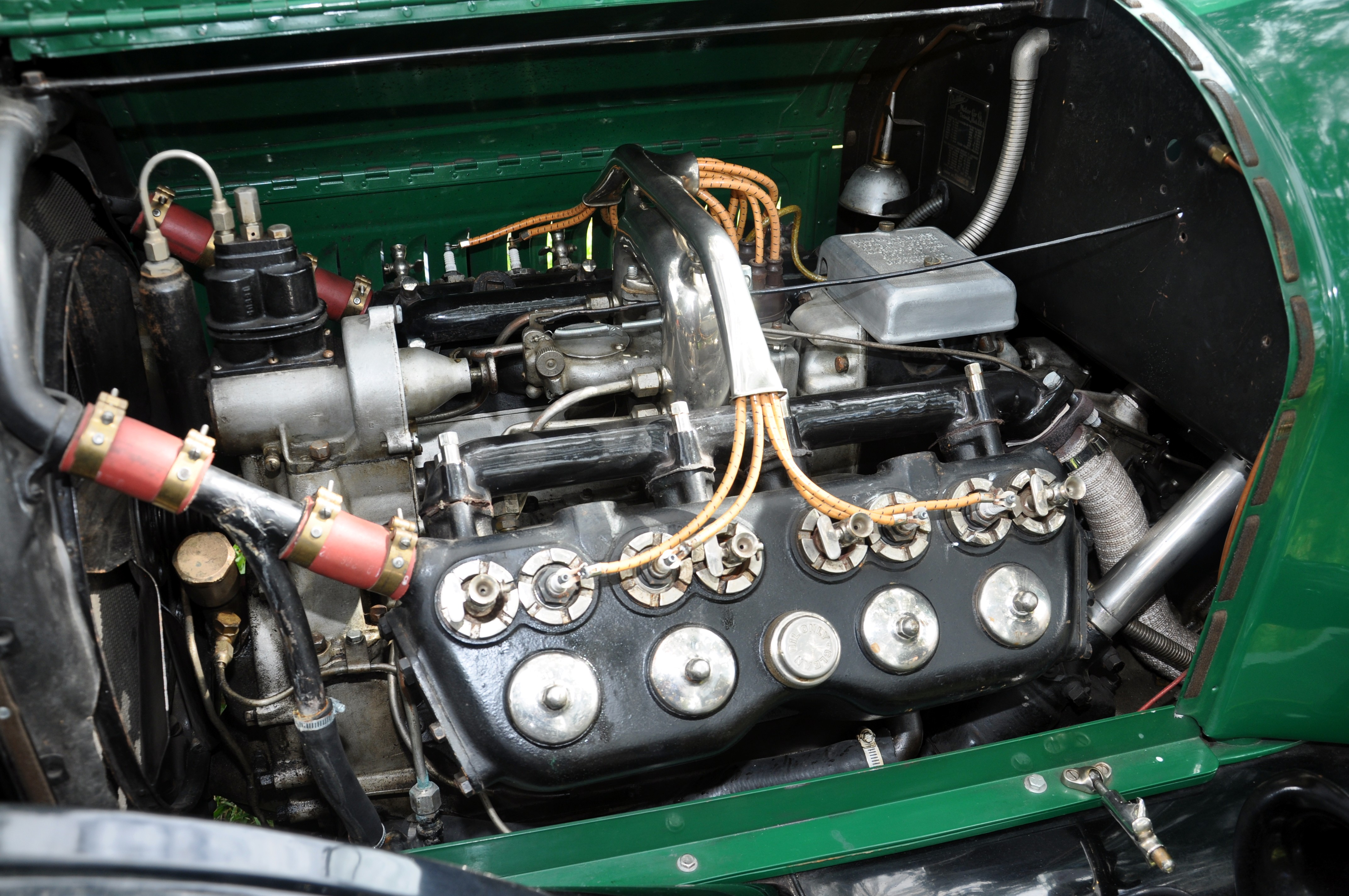
Type 51, 1915

The Type 51 was the first Cadillac V8. Introduced in 1914, it was the standard engine for 1915 Cadillac models. It was a 90° design with an L-head (sidevalve) configuration and was water-cooled. Bore and stroke was 3.125 in × 5.125 in (79.4 mm × 130.2 mm), for a total of 314 cu in (5.1 L) of displacement. Output was 70 hp (52 kW).

This engine was designed under the leadership of Cadillac's chief engineer (1914–1917), Scottish-born D (D'Orsay) McCall White (1880 -), later a vice president of Cadillac. Hired by Henry Leland for his V-engine expertise from his employment as chief engineer at Napier, and previously Daimler at Coventry, he was later to move to Nash with LaFayette. White was appointed to a committee of three to supervise the development of the V12 Liberty aircraft motor, that later contributed to cross town rival Lincoln Motor Company introducing the Lincoln L series much later in 1917.

The engine was refined for 1923 with a crossplane crankshaft that introduced the (now standard) 90° offset for each pair of cylinders which improved balance and smoothness. Power was up to 83.5 hp (62.3 kW).

The L-head was on the Ward's 10 Best Engines of the 20th century list.

L-head applications:

- Cadillac Type 51
- Cadillac Type 53
- Cadillac Type 55
- Cadillac Type 57
- Cadillac Type 59
- Cadillac Type 61
- Cadillac V-63
- Cadillac Series 341
- Oldsmobile Light Eight

Cadillac created a new V8, the 341, for 1928. It was a 341 cu in (5.6 L) engine and produced 90 hp (67 kW). The same year saw the introduction of the synchromesh transmission. This engine was used in the Series 341 and 341B cars of 1928 and 1929.

From 1930 through 1935, Cadillac produced a version with an increased displacement of 353 cu in (5.8 L). This used a 3.38 in × 4.94 in (85.9 mm × 125.5 mm) bore and stroke. This engine was used in the Cadillac Series 353 and Series 355.

== Monobloc ==
A 322 cu in (5.3 L) "monobloc engine" was used in the 1936 Series 60. It was designed to be the company's next-generation powerplant at reduced cost from the 353 and Cadillac V12. The monobloc's cylinders and crankcase were cast as a single unit, and it used hydraulic valve lifters for durability. This design allowed the creation of the mid-priced Series 60 line.

Bore and stroke was 3.375 in × 4.5 in (85.7 mm × 114.3 mm). This engine was closely related to a monobloc design earlier introduced in the 1936–1948 346 cu in (5.7 L) engine, which was modified with a 3.5 in (88.9 mm) bore. This was used in the Series 60/60S/61/62/63/65/67 and 70/72/75. It was also used in a dual setup in tanks (e.g. M5 Stuart and the M24 Chaffee), in World War II mated to a Hydramatic transmission.

=== LaSalle ===
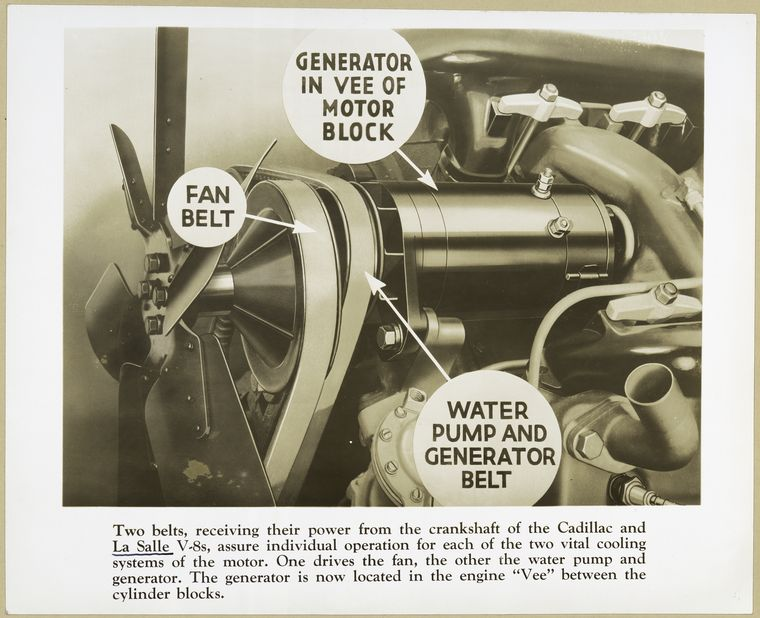
1937 LaSalle V8 engine detail

In 1937, the new monobloc flathead gained 24 cu in (390 cc) in Cadillac V-8 models to 346 cu in (5.7 L), while the LaSalle straight-8 of 1934–1936 that originated from Oldsmobile actually was replaced with the 1936 smaller 322 cu in (5.3 L) version at 125 hp (93 kW). In 1941, the LaSalle nameplate was phased out along with the 322 cu in (5.3 L), and Cadillacs, all 346 cu in (5.7 L) powered, were available with the new Hydramatic automatic transmission which debuted in Oldsmobile the previous year. These engines were produced through 1948.

== OHV ==
=== 331 series ===
For 1949, Cadillac and Oldsmobile each produced their V8 designs (the Oldsmobile engine was the 303). Both of the engines were overhead valve designs, pioneered by Buick. The Cadillac 331 engine featured a "dry" (coolant exited through an assembly attached directly to the cylinder heads), open runner (requiring the use of a tappet valve cover) intake manifold, rear-mounted distributor, and shaft-mounted rockers. Crankshaft end play is carried by the rear bearing on the two GM engines. It has the lighter "skirtless" block where the oil pan flange does not descend appreciably below the crankshaft centerline and they both have a partial integral cast iron clutch housing that compares to the early Chrysler Hemi V8 design. 1955 331 engines went to a lighter "flat back" that bolted to a clutch and flywheel housing at the front of the transmission.

Bore and stroke are 3 13/16 in × 3 5/8 in (96.8 mm × 92.1 mm) for an overall displacement of 331.1 cu in (5.4 L). This engine features an oiling system which uses a central cast-in passage between the lifter galleries feeding oil to the cam and crank by grooves machined into the cam bores. A single drilled passage per bearing saddle feeds both cam and crank journals. Shared with the Oldsmobile Rocket V8 is how the lifters are supplied oil through small "bleeds" instead of placing the lifters directly into the right and left side oil supply galleries. Many early racers would replace the Cadillac hydraulic lifter and rocker assemblies with the solid lifters and adjustable rockers from the Studebaker V8 for operation at higher engine speeds.

==== 365 ====
Displacement was increased to 365 cu in (6.0 L) for 1956 by increasing the bore to 4 inches (101.6 mm) while maintaining the 3 5/8 in (92.1 mm) stroke. For the three years that the 365 was made, the base versions had a single four-barrel carburetor. The 1956 version produced 285 horsepower. The 1957 version raised that base engine output to 300 horsepower, while the 1958 base version cranked out 310. Eldorados featured multi-carb engines in all 3 years. The Eldorado engines were also optional on all other Cadillacs. The 1958 Eldorado 3-2bbl version produced 335 hp (250 kW).

==== 390 ====
A longer, 3 7/8 in (98.4 mm) stroke pushed displacement to 389.6 cu in (6.4 L) for 1959, yielding 325 hp (242 kW), while the Eldorado Tri-power reached 345 hp (257 kW).

=== 390 series ===
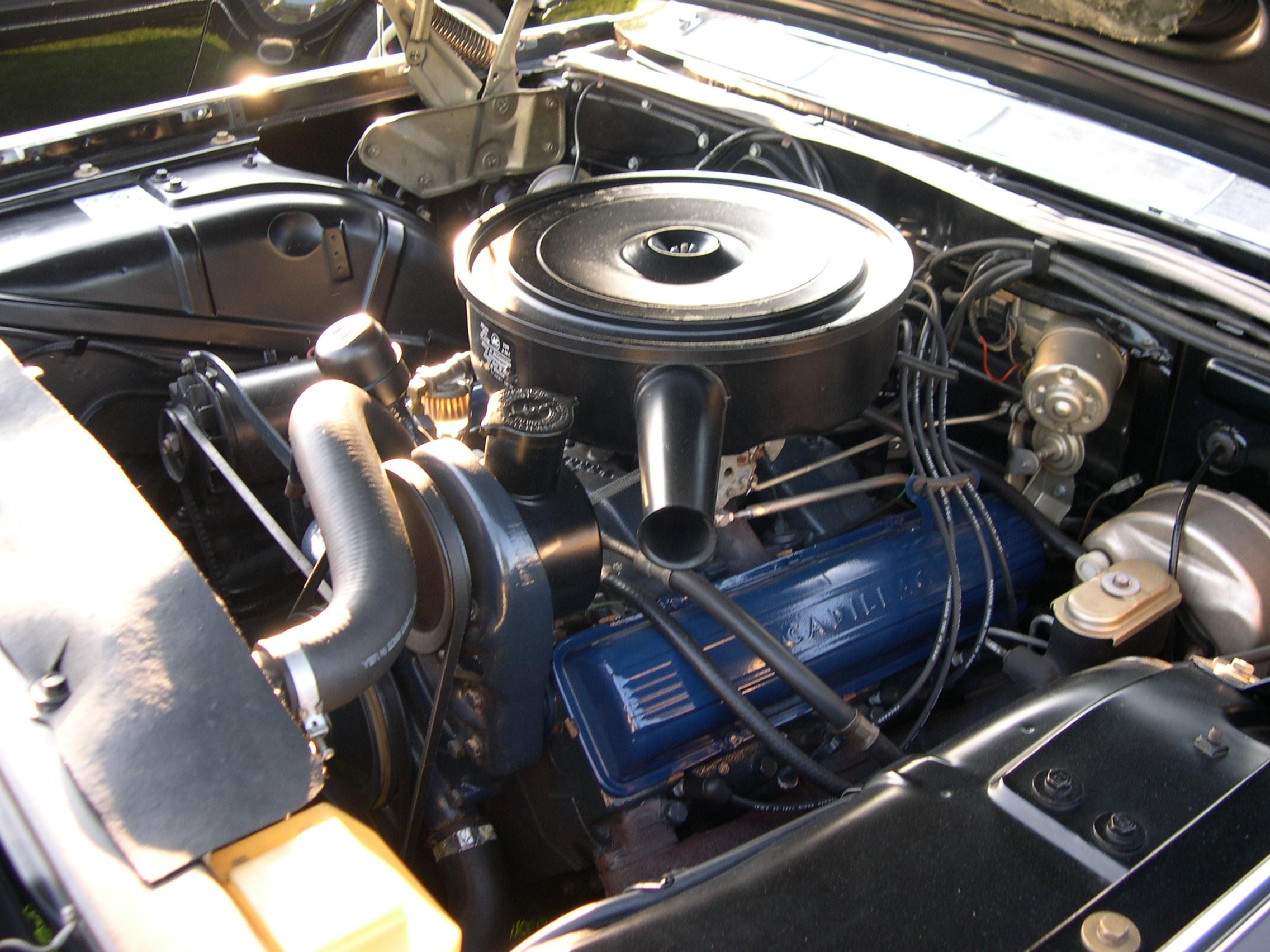
1962 Cadillac Series 62 390 V8 engine

For the 1963 model year, Cadillac redesigned its V8 engine, modernizing the tooling used in the production line while optimizing the engine's design. Although it shared the same layout and architecture with the 1949-vintage engine, the revised engine had shorter connecting rods and was 1 in (25 mm) lower, 4 in (101.6 mm) narrower, and 1.25 in (32 mm) shorter. The accessories (water pump, power steering pump, distributor) mounted on a die-cast aluminum housing at the front of the engine for improved accessibility. An alternator replaced the former generator. The crankshaft was cored out to make it both lighter and stronger. The revised engine was 52 lb (24 kg) lighter than its predecessor, for a total dry weight of 595 lb (270 kg).

The revised engine shared the same 4 in × 3.875 in (101.6 mm × 98.4 mm) bore and stroke of its predecessor, for an unchanged displacement of 390 cu in (6.4 L). Power was unchanged at 325 hp (242 kW), as was torque at 430 lb⋅ft (583 N⋅m).

==== 429 ====
For 1964, the engine had a 4.13 in × 4 in (105 mm × 102 mm) bore and stroke, raising displacement to 429 cu in (7.0 L). Power rose to 340 hp (254 kW) and torque to 480 lb⋅ft (651 N⋅m). It also included its first emission control system, which was a positive crankcase ventilation unit. The 429 was used through the 1967 model year.

=== 472 series ===
Cadillac introduced an all-new engine for 1968. Although the modernized 390 series engine was compact and light for its displacement and output, 429 cu in (7.0 L) represented the limit of the original architecture's expansion, and it had been surpassed by Chrysler's 440 and Lincoln's 462 and 460. Cadillac went bigger, with provision for even more expansion.

At introduction, the new engine had a 4.3 in × 4.06 in (109.2 mm × 103.1 mm) bore and stroke for a displacement of 472 cu in (7.7 L). "Extensively redesigned" to ease maintenance, it used 10% fewer parts and 25% fewer gasketed joints as before. It delivered 375 hp (280 kW) at 4400 rpm and a massive 525 lb⋅ft (712 N⋅m) torque at just 3000 rpm. The new engine was about 80 lb (36 kg) heavier than its predecessor. It was used through 1974. It was designed with potential for a 500-cubic-inch (8.2 L) displacement.

==== 500 ====
For 1970, Cadillac fitted a crankshaft with a 4.304 in (109.3 mm) stroke, increasing total displacement on the engine to 500.02 cu in (8.2 L). At its introduction it was rated at 400 hp (298 kW), SAE gross, and 550 lb⋅ft (746 N⋅m) of torque. For 1971, compression was reduced from 10.0:1 to 8.5:1, the lowered compression ratio dropped the 500's gross output from 400 bhp (298 kW) to 365 bhp (272 kW), or 235 hp (175 kW) in the new SAE net ratings. By 1976, its final year, it had fallen to 190 hp (142 kW). However, a new Bendix electronic fuel injection system was offered as an option, and it increased power output to 215 hp (160 kW). The 500 was exclusive to the Eldorado.

Year	Engine VIN code	Engine letter code	Displacement	Rated horsepower	Rated torque	Bore x stroke	Compression ratio	Oil pressure
1968–1969	None	None	472 cu in (7.7 L)	375 hp (280 kW) at 4400 rpm	525 lb⋅ft (712 N⋅m) at 3000 rpm	4.3 in × 4.06 in (109.2 mm × 103.1 mm)	10.5:1	33 psi (2.3 bar)
1970 (SAE gross)	None	None	472 cu in (7.7 L)	375 hp (280 kW) at 4400 rpm	525 lb⋅ft (712 N⋅m) at 3000 rpm	4.3 in × 4.06 in (109.2 mm × 103.1 mm)	10.0:1	35–40 psi (2.4–2.8 bar)
1970 (SAE gross)	None	None	500 cu in (8.2 L)	400 hp (298 kW) at 4400 rpm	550 lb⋅ft (746 N⋅m) at 3000 rpm	4.3 in × 4.304 in (109.2 mm × 109.3 mm)	10.0:1	35–40 psi (2.4–2.8 bar)
1971 (SAE gross)	R	61E,Q	472 cu in (7.7 L)	345 hp (257 kW) at 4400 rpm	500 lb⋅ft (678 N⋅m) at 2800 rpm	4.3 in × 4.06 in (109.2 mm × 103.1 mm)	8.5:1	35–40 psi (2.4–2.8 bar)
1971 (SAE gross)	S	61E,Q	500 cu in (8.2 L)	365 hp (272 kW) at 4400 rpm	535 lb⋅ft (725 N⋅m) at 2800 rpm	4.3 in × 4.304 in (109.2 mm × 109.3 mm)	8.5:1	35–40 psi (2.4–2.8 bar)
1972 (SAE net)	R	62E,Q	472 cu in (7.7 L)	220 hp (164 kW) at 4400 rpm	365 lb⋅ft (495 N⋅m) at 2400 rpm	4.3 in × 4.06 in (109.2 mm × 103.1 mm)	8.5:1	35 psi (2.4 bar)
1972 (SAE net)	S	62E,Q	500 cu in (8.2 L)	235 hp (175 kW) at 4400 rpm	385 lb⋅ft (522 N⋅m) at 2400 rpm	4.3 in × 4.304 in (109.2 mm × 109.3 mm)	8.5:1	35 psi (2.4 bar)
1973	R	63E,Q	472 cu in (7.7 L)	220 hp (164 kW) at 4400 rpm	365 lb⋅ft (495 N⋅m) at 2400 rpm	4.3 in × 4.06 in (109.2 mm × 103.1 mm)	8.5:1	35 psi (2.4 bar)
1973	S	63E,Q	500 cu in (8.2 L)	235 hp (175 kW) at 4400 rpm	385 lb⋅ft (522 N⋅m) at 2400 rpm	4.3 in × 4.304 in (109.2 mm × 109.3 mm)	8.5:1	35 psi (2.4 bar)
1974	R	64E,Q	472 cu in (7.7 L)	205 hp (153 kW) at 4400 rpm	380 lb⋅ft (515 N⋅m) at 2400 rpm	4.3 in × 4.06 in (109.2 mm × 103.1 mm)	8.5:1	35 psi (2.4 bar)
1974	S	64E,Q	500 cu in (8.2 L)	210 hp (157 kW) at 3600 rpm	380 lb⋅ft (515 N⋅m) at 2000 rpm	4.3 in × 4.304 in (109.2 mm × 109.3 mm)	8.5:1	35 psi (2.4 bar)
1975	S	65E,Q	500 cu in (8.2 L)	210 hp (157 kW) at 3600 rpm	380 lb⋅ft (515 N⋅m) at 2000 rpm	4.3 in × 4.304 in (109.2 mm × 109.3 mm)	8.5:1	35 psi (2.4 bar)
1976	S	66E,Q	500 cu in (8.2 L)	190 hp (142 kW) at 3600 rpm	360 lb⋅ft (488 N⋅m) at 2000 rpm	4.3 in × 4.304 in (109.2 mm × 109.3 mm)	8.5:1	35 psi (2.4 bar)

=== 425 series ===
Starting in the mid to late 1970s, Cadillac expanded its product range, offering more mid-sized vehicles. For example, while the Cadillac Seville initially used a variant of the 350 cu in (5.7 L) Oldsmobile gasoline V8, Cadillac also began work on its own proprietary engines.

In 1977, Cadillac introduced a new 425 cu in (7.0 L) V8, based on the architecture of the 472, but with a smaller, 4.082 in (103.7 mm) bore and the same 4.06 in (103.1 mm) stroke. The new engine was also 100 lb (45 kg) lighter.

The 425 was offered in L33 form, with a four-barrel carburetor, producing 180 hp (134 kW) at 4000 rpm and 320 lb⋅ft (434 N⋅m) of torque at 2000 rpm, and L35 with electronic multi-port fuel injection for 195 hp (145 kW) and 320 lb⋅ft (434 N⋅m) of torque, but peaked at 2400 rpm.

The 425 was used through 1979 on all Cadillacs except the Seville and 1979 Eldorados.

==== 368 ====
In 1980, the 425 was replaced with the L61, which was the same basic 472 family engine de-bored to 3.8 in (97 mm) but retaining the 472 and 425 engines' 4.06 in (103.1 mm) stroke for a total displacement of 368 cu in (6.0 L). The reduction in displacement was largely an effort to meet CAFE requirements for fuel economy. Throttle-body fuel injection was now standard on Eldorado and Seville when equipped with the 368. Rear-wheel-drive cars and the Commercial Chassis for hearse and ambulance builders used the Rochester Quadrajet 4-barrel carburetor.

Cadillac referred to this new TBI (throttle-body fuel injection) system as Digital Fuel Injection (DFI); this particular induction system was later adopted by other GM divisions, except on Oldsmobile V8s, and was used well into the mid-1990s on GM trucks.

Power output dropped to 145 hp (108 kW) at 3600 rpm and torque to 270 lb⋅ft (366 N⋅m) at 2000 rpm in DEFI forms as used on the front-wheel-drive Seville and Eldorado but 150 hp (112 kW) on the four-barrel Quadrajet-equipped RWD models. This engine was standard on all Cadillacs except the redesigned Seville, in which it was optional.

==== V8-6-4 ====
For 1981, Cadillac introduced a new engine that would become notorious for its unreliable electronics, the V8-6-4 (L62). The L61 had not provided a significant improvement in the company's CAFE numbers, so Cadillac and Eaton Corporation devised a cylinder deactivation system called Modulated Displacement that would shut off two or four cylinders in low-load conditions such as highway cruising, then reactivate them when more power was needed. When deactivated, solenoids mounted to those cylinders' rocker arm studs would disengage the fulcrums, allowing the rockers to "float" and leave the valves closed despite the continued action of the pushrods. These engines are easily identified by their rocker covers, which each have elevated sections over two cylinders with electrical connectors on top. With the valves closed, the cylinders acted as air springs, which both eliminated the feel of "missing" and kept the cylinders warm for instant combustion upon reactivation. Simultaneously, the engine control module would reduce the amount of fuel metered through the TBI unit. On the dashboard, an "MPG Sentinel" digital display could show the number of cylinders in operation, average or current fuel consumption (in miles per gallon), or estimated range based on the amount of fuel remaining in the tank and the average efficiency since the last reset.

Another rare and advanced feature introduced with DFI was Cadillac's truly "on-board" diagnostics. For mechanics who had to deal with the 368s, the cars contained diagnostics that did not require the use of special external computer scan tools. The new electronic climate control display, along with the MPG Sentinel, provided on-board readout of any stored trouble codes, instantaneous readings from all the various engine sensors, forced cycling of the underhood solenoids and motors, and on the V8-6-4 engines, manual cylinder-pair control. The L62 produced 140 hp (104 kW) at 3800 rpm and 265 lb⋅ft (359 N⋅m) at 1400 rpm. Cadillac hailed the L62 as a technological masterpiece, and made it standard equipment across the whole Cadillac line.

While cylinder deactivation would make a comeback some 20 years later with modern computing power (and using oil pressure to deactivate the valves by collapsing the lifters), Cadillac's 1981 V8-6-4 proved to have insurmountable engineering problems. The main issue was that the engine control module simply lacked the robustness, programming and processing speed to efficiently manage the cylinder-deactivation under all load conditions. In the era before electronically operated EGR valves, the engineers also made an error in using a back-pressure-type EGR valve. While this early effort to match the vacuum-controlled EGR volume more accurately to the engine's load made sense in a conventional engine, it had the effect of causing pinging (detonation) problems in the V8-6-4 engine, because four cylinders operating under higher load needed more EGR, while they were actually producing less exhaust flow and therefore less back-pressure to operate the valve.

In an effort to increase reliability, Cadillac issued thirteen updated PROM chips for the ECMs, but many of these engines simply had their Modulated Displacement function disabled by dealers, leaving them with permanent eight-cylinder operation. This was accomplished by merely disconnecting a single wire from the transmission's "3rd-gear switch", or running it through a switch inside the car for manual override. The 368 was dropped from most Cadillac passenger cars after the 1981 model year, although the V8-6-4 remained the standard engine for Fleetwood Limousines and the carbureted 368 remained in the Commercial Chassis through 1984.

The 368 has the distinction of being the last traditional "big-block" cast-iron pushrod V8 engine available in a production car. It lasted through 1984 in the limousines. Rival big blocks, ranging in displacement from 396 to 460 cubic inches, disappeared between 1976 and 1978. RWD models were coupled with the heavy-duty THM400 transmission, the last factory-produced GM passenger car fitted with this transmission.

GM reintroduced an updated fuel management system in 2005, marketed as Active Fuel Management or Displacement on Demand.

== Cadillac High Technology engine ==
The OHV Cadillac High Technology engine was produced from 1982 to 1995 in displacements of 4.087 L (249.4 cu in), 4.467 L (272.6 cu in), and 4.893 L (298.6 cu in).

== Northstar ==
Cadillac's DOHC, four-valve-per-cylinder Northstar debuted in 1992, which at the time was its most technologically advanced engine.

Although Oldsmobile, Pontiac, and Buick have borrowed the Northstar architecture for their V8 (and even V6) engines, it was not until the 2004 Pontiac Bonneville that a non-Cadillac used the Northstar name.

The Northstar has been produced in 4.6 L; 278.6 cu in (4,565 cc), 4.4 L; 266.7 cu in (4,371 cc), and 4.0 L; 243.8 cu in (3,995 cc) versions.

=== 4.6 L ===
The 4.6 L; 278.6 cu in (4,565 cc) 275 hp (205 kW) version was available starting in 1993 on the Seville SLS and Eldorado ESC. The Allanté, the Seville STS, and the Eldorado ETC had the 300 hp (224 kW) version of the Northstar. In 1994, the DeVille Concours received the 270 hp (201 kW) version of this engine. By 1996, the Northstar engine became standard equipment in the front-wheel-drive Cadillac line. The 275 hp (205 kW) engine was in the Seville SLS 1993–2004, Eldorado ESC 1993–2002, Standard Deville 1996–2005, Devile d'elegance 1997–1999, and Deville DHS 2000–2005. The 300 hp (224 kW) version was used in the Seville STS 1993–2004, Eldorado ETC 1996–2002, Deville Concours 1997–1999, and Deville DTS 2000–2005. Its final appearance was in the final generation of the DTS series, produced from 2006 to 2011.

The 275 hp (205 kW) version of the Northstar was also standard equipment in the top GXP trim level of the Pontiac Bonneville, produced only in 2004 and 2005. It was also the top engine option available in the Buick Lucerne CXS and a 292 hp (218 kW) NHP (Northstar High Output) version in the Buick Lucerne Super, produced from 2006 through 2011. The Lucerne shared its platform and the Detroit/Hamtramck assembly plant with the final generation of the Cadillac DTS.

=== 4.4 L ===
The 4.4 L; 266.7 cu in (4,371 cc) versions were all supercharged, exclusive to Cadillac's V-series. The STS-V engine, produces 469 hp (350 kW) and 439 lb⋅ft (595 N⋅m) under the SAE certified rating system.

The 2006 - 2008 XLR-V uses the same supercharged Northstar V8 as the STS-V, though output is down somewhat due to design changes made to accommodate the model's more limited underhood space. For the XLR-V, the SAE certified output is 443 hp (330 kW) and 414 lb⋅ft (561 N⋅m). The supercharger and four intercoolers are built into the intake manifold.

The bores were reduced in size to increase block strength, increasing the safety margin under boost.

=== 4.0 L ===
The 4.0 L; 243.8 cu in (3,995 cc) is the Oldsmobile Aurora variant, never installed in a Cadillac. The Aurora's cylinder heads had lower flow characteristics to match the engine's reduced size. This engine produces 250 hp (186 kW).

== Cadillac use of non-Cadillac V8s ==
=== RWD Fleetwood, Seville, and Brougham ===
The engine in the 1976–1979 Seville was "marketed" as a Cadillac engine and was exclusive to the Cadillac product line, but was in reality produced by the Oldsmobile division. Buyers were able to choose between 350 gasoline and 350 diesel versions. From 1982 to 1985, all rear-wheel-drive Cadillacs (except for the limousines) could be ordered with the 350 cu in (5.7 L) Oldsmobile LF9 Diesel V8. In fact, for most of its life, the 1980–1985 version of Cadillac's Seville came standard with Oldsmobile's V8 diesel, with the gasoline engine being a no-cost option.

From 1986 to 1990, the rear-wheel-drive Cadillac Brougham used a carbureted 307 cu in (5.0 L) Oldsmobile V8 (replacing the Cadillac HT-4100). In 1990, a 175 hp (130 kW), fuel-injected small-block 350 cu in (5.7 L) Chevrolet L05 V8 was available for Brougham models equipped with the towing package. In 1991, the Oldsmobile 307 was replaced with a 305 cu in (5.0 L) throttle body fuel-injected small-block Chevrolet L03 V8, which was also found in Chevrolet's Caprice, C/K light trucks, and G-series vans. In 1993, the 180 hp (134 kW) 350 cu in (5.7 L) L05 V8 became standard in the newly-renamed Cadillac Fleetwood. In 1994, the L05 was replaced with an iron-headed small-block Chevrolet Corvette LT1 V8 with 260 hp (194 kW), which the Fleetwood used until discontinued at the end of the 1996 model year.

=== Escalade ===
With the introduction of the Escalade to the Cadillac lineup, the small-block Chevrolet L31 V8 (Vortec 5700) was used, as it was part of the C/K truck line on which the Escalade was based. In 2001, the newly-redesigned 2002 Escalade used the performance version of the 6.0 L Generation III series engine (RPO code LQ9), although the regular length 2002–2005 Escalade 2WD used the 5.3-liter LM7 version of the Generation III series engine. From 2007 to 2014, all Cadillac Escalades were equipped with the Generation IV 6.2L engine, which was also used in the GMC Yukon Denali, while hybrid models used a 6.0-liter version of the Generation IV series engine. Since 2015, gasoline-powered Escalades have used the Generation V 6.2L engine, with the Escalade-V using a supercharged version known as the LT4.

=== CTS-V ===
The 2004 and 2005 Cadillac CTS-V used the previous-generation Corvette C5's 400 hp (298 kW) 5.7 L LS6 Gen III V8. The 2006 and 2007 CTS-V used the 400 hp (298 kW) 6.0 L LS2 Gen IV V8, similar to that used in the standard Corvette C6. The 2009–2015 CTS-V carried a supercharged 6.2 L LSA variant of the Gen IV V8, producing an SAE-certified 556 hp (415 kW), while the 2016–2019 model carried a supercharged 6.2 L LT4 with 640 hp (477 kW).

=== CT5-V Blackwing ===
The 2022–present Cadillac CT5-V Blackwing carries a supercharged 6.2 L LT4 variant of the Gen V series engine, producing 668 hp (498 kW), the most powerful Cadillac sedan in history.

== Cadillac 4.2L twin-turbo V8 LTA engine ==
The 4.2-liter V8 engine (GM RPO code LTA) is an eight-cylinder, dual overhead cam (DOHC) twin turbo engine produced by General Motors specifically for use in Cadillac luxury vehicles. The engine is the result of a new clean-sheet engine design as well as Cadillac's first twin-turbo V8 engine. It first launched with the 2019 Cadillac CT6.

== See also ==
- Cadillac V16 engine (used during the 1930s)

From the 1950s through the 1970s, each GM division had its own V8 engine family. Some were shared among other divisions, but each respective design was engineered and developed by its own division:

- Buick V8 engine
- GMC V8 engine
- Chevrolet small-block engine (first- and second-generation)
- Chevrolet big-block engine
- Oldsmobile V8 engine
- Pontiac V8 engine
- Holden V8 engine

GM later standardized on the later generations of the Chevrolet design:

- General Motors LS-based small-block engine
- List of GM engines
