= Cadillac V-12 =

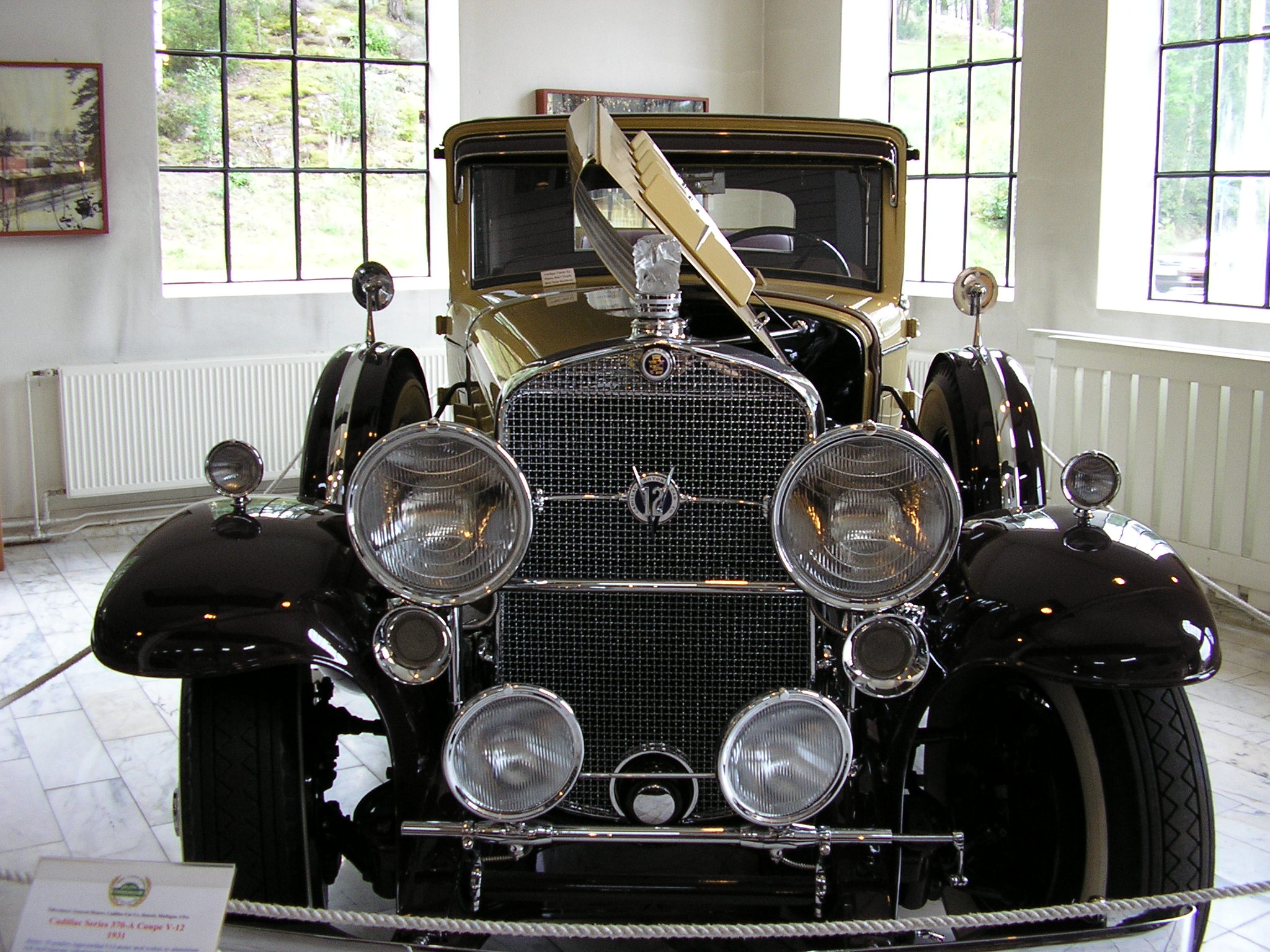

Overview
- Manufacturer: Cadillac (General Motors)
- Production: 1930–1937
- Assembly: Detroit, Michigan, United States
- Designer: Harley Earl

Body and chassis
- Class: Full-size luxury car
- Body style: 2-door convertible 4-door convertible 2-door coupe 4-door sedan 4-door town car 4-door limousine
- Layout: FR layout
- Platform: D-body

Powertrain
- Engine: 368 cu in (6.0 L) Cadillac V12
- Transmission: 3-speed synchromesh manual

The Cadillac V-12 is an exclusive V-12 powered luxury car that was manufactured by Cadillac from the 1930 through the 1937. Below only the maker's top-of-the-line Cadillac V-16 line, these were powered by the Cadillac V12 engine, furnished with similar custom bodies, and built in relatively small numbers. A total of 10,903 were made in the seven model years that the automobile was built, with the majority having been constructed in its inaugural year. It was Cadillac's first, and is to date, Cadillac's only standard production V-12 automobile.

== Origin ==
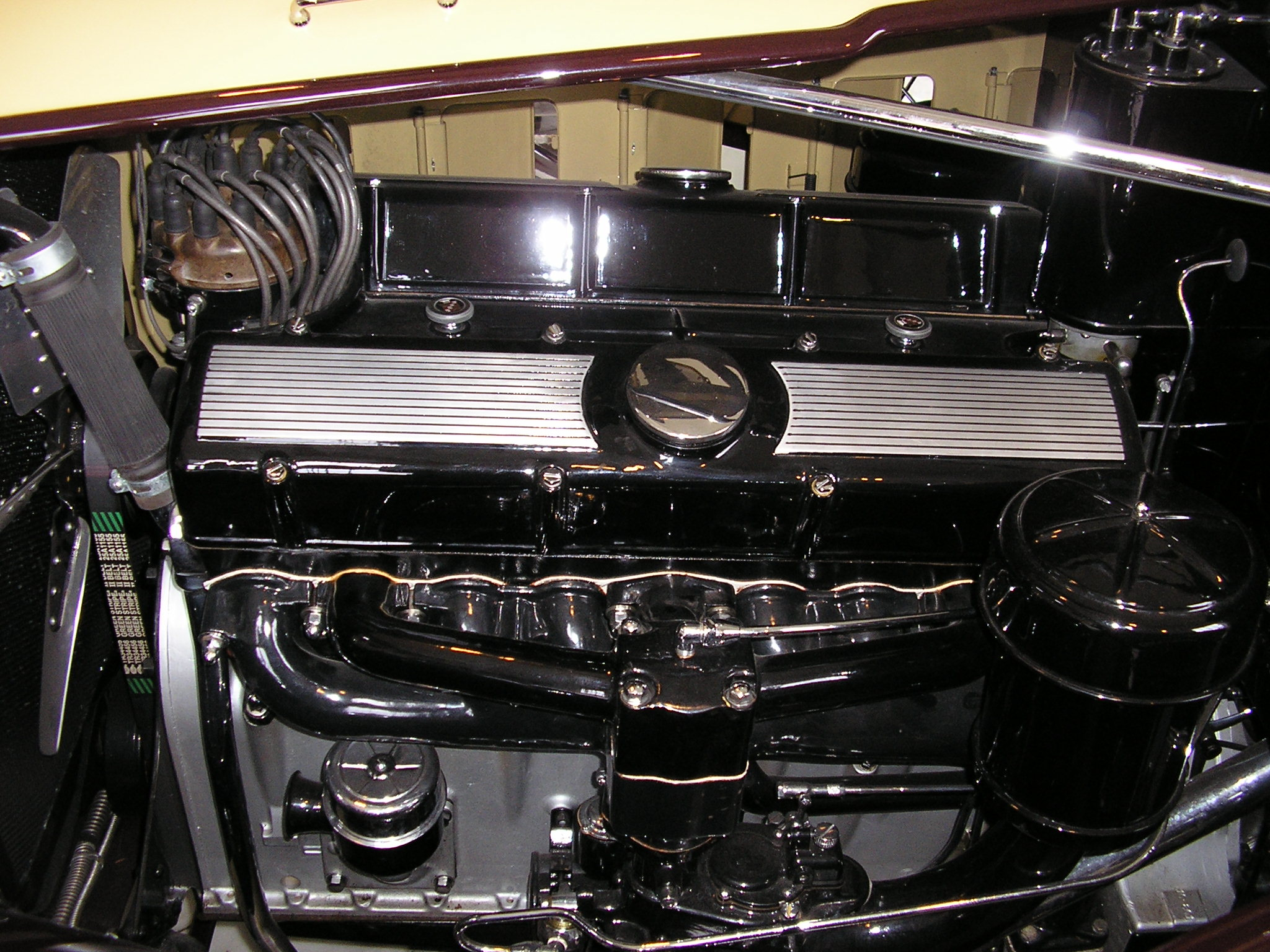
Cadillac V-12 engine

In the mid to late 1920s a number of luxury car manufacturers began work developing extravagant V-configuration engines, with more cylinders delivering more and smoother power than the then upper-end straight-8 and V-8 engines being produced. Not to be outdone, Cadillac began work on an engine to top all others, a V-16, and a V-12 derived from it to place the company on equal footing with the few manufacturers producing one. Larry Fisher, Cadillac General Manager, leaked to the press information about the V-12, hoping to keep the V-16 a secret.

Owen Nacker, who designed the 45-degree overhead valve Cadillac V-16 engine, also designed the V-12 derived from it. The latter was essentially a truncated V-16, which retained the V-16's 4" stroke but was bored out to 3.125" from 3". The 45-degree bank angle was less ideal than a 60 degree design. The V-12 was less powerful than the V-16, generating 135 versus 175 horsepower. Both engines featured overhead valves in the first generation.

== Series 370 (1931–1935) ==
Series 370
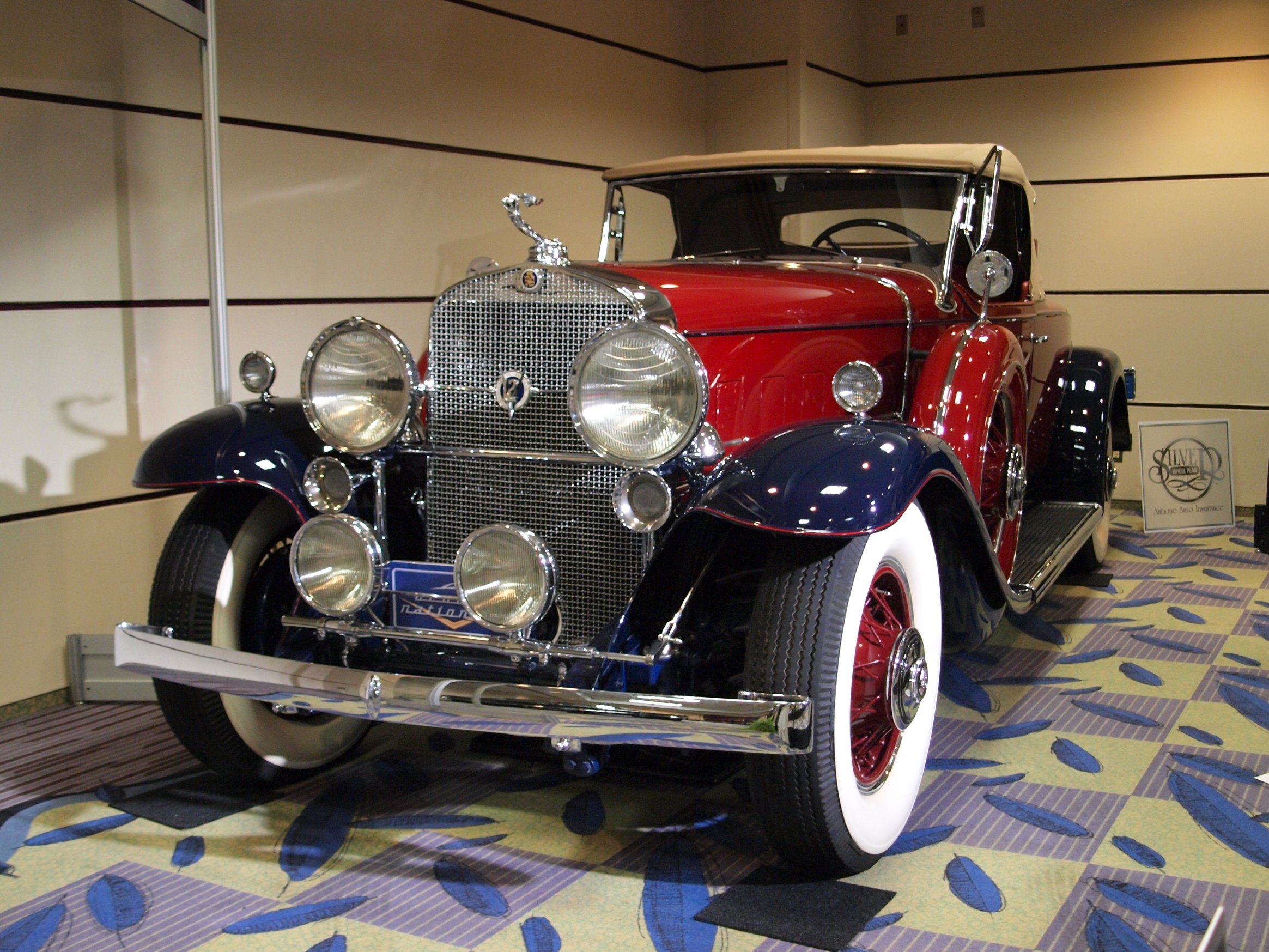

Overview
- Model years: 1931–1935

Body and chassis
- Related: Cadillac Series 452; Cadillac Series 355

Dimensions
- Wheelbase: 1931: 140.0 in (3,556 mm); 143.0 in (3,632 mm); 1932–33: 134.0 in (3,404 mm); 140.0 in (3,556 mm); 1934–35: 146.0 in (3,708 mm); Commercial: 1931: 152.0 in (3,861 mm); 1932–33: 156.0 in (3,962 mm)
- Length: 1931: 209.0 in (5,309 mm); 1932–33: 207.0 in (5,258 mm) and 213.0 in (5,410 mm); 1934–35: 216.0 in (5,486 mm)
- Width: 1931: 73.6 in (1,869 mm); 1932–35: 77.0 in (1,956 mm)
- Height: 1931: 72.5 in (1,842 mm); 1932–33: 71.5 in (1,816 mm); 1934–35: 69.5 in (1,765 mm)
- Curb weight: 5,200–6,200 lb (2,400–2,800 kg)

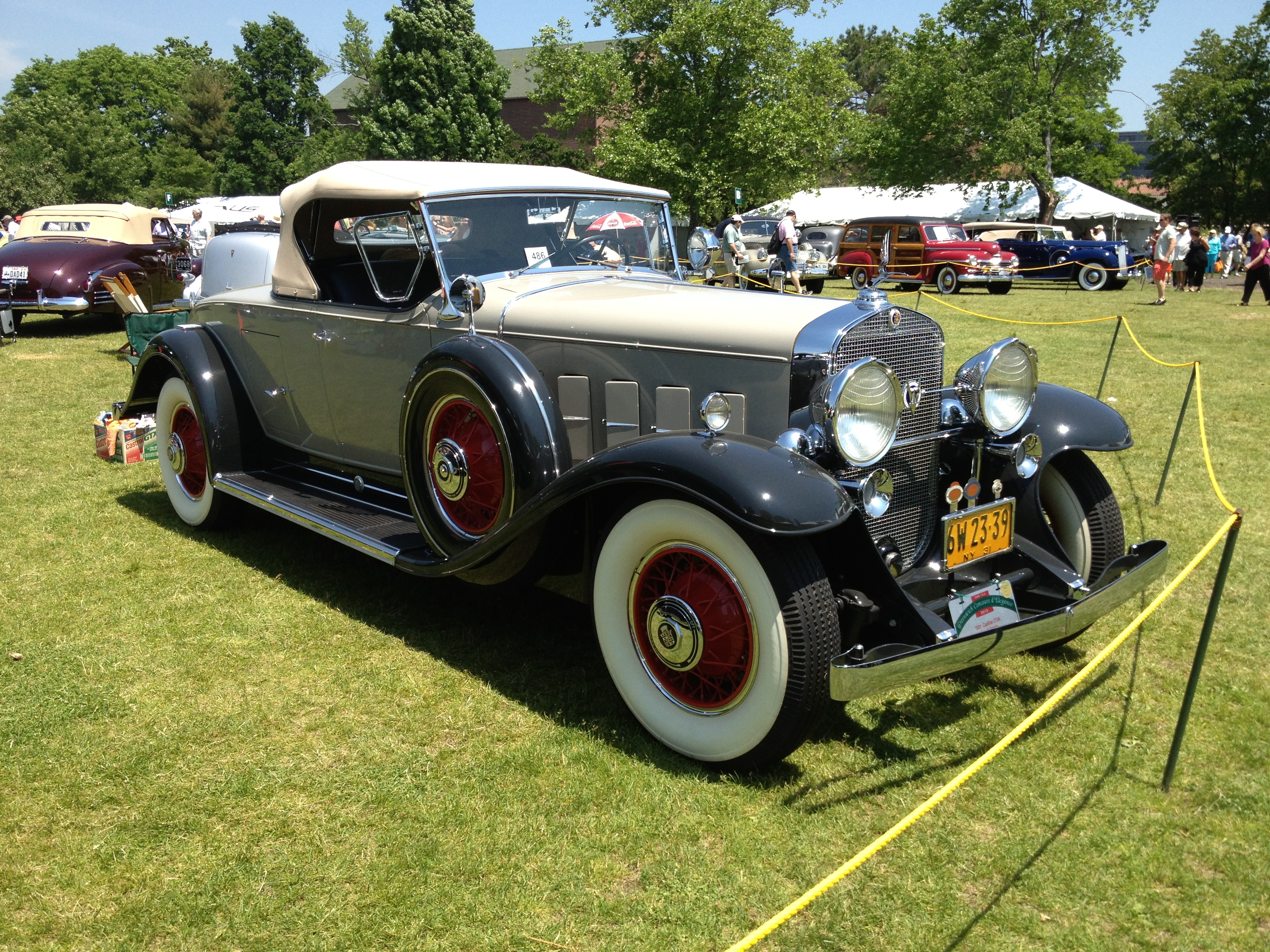
A 1931 Cadillac 370A

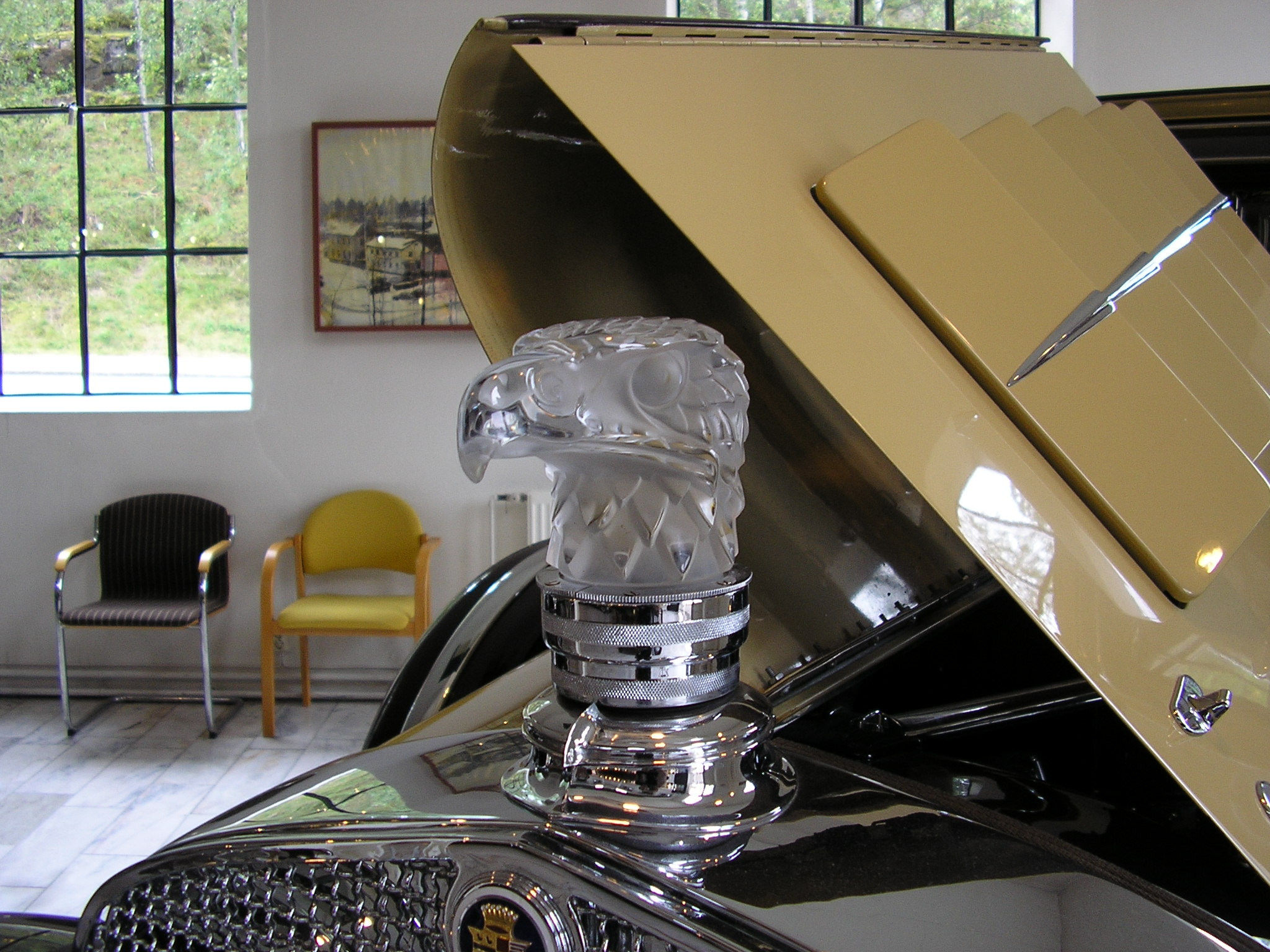
A 1931 Cadillac Series 370A hood ornament

The 1931 Model 370A V-12 was introduced in October 1930. A V-12 roadster was used as the pace car at the Indianapolis 500. The Cadillac V-12 had a shorter wheelbase than the Cadillac V-16, with a choice of 140 in (3,556 mm) or 143 in (3,632 mm), compared to the V-16's 148 in (3,759 mm), but it offered a similar choice of Fisher and Fleetwood semi-custom bodies. It was difficult to tell a Cadillac V-12 from a Cadillac V-16 unless you were close enough to read the figure "12" mounted on the headlight tie bar, but the hood was four inches (102 mm) shorter, and the headlights and horns smaller than a V-16's. More significantly, the V-12 cost about $2,000 less for each bodystyle, starting at $3,795 ($80,343 in 2025 dollars). The Cadillac V-12 might have been lower in prestige than the Cadillac V-16, but it joined a select group of 1930s cars with multicylinder engines, namely those manufactured by Auburn, Franklin, Hispano-Suiza, Horch, Lagonda, Maybach, Packard, Pierce-Arrow, Rolls-Royce, Tatra, Voisin, Walter, Marmon and Lincoln. Moreover, thanks to its lower price, it immediately outsold the Cadillac V-16 with 5,733 sold in the 1931 model year, versus a mere 363 for the V-16.

The appearance of the 1932 Series 370B benefited from a radiator shell that flared on the top, more flaring fenders and curved running boards. Mechanical changes included a stiffer frame, and a Cuno self-cleaning oil filter mounted at the right hand side of the clutch housing. Dual Detroit Lubricator carburetors were used in place of the Cadillac/Johnson carburetors that had been standard equipment on Cadillacs for 20 years. Largely thanks to the deepening Great Depression sales plunged to 1740 units.

Styling changes to the 1933 Series 370C included a V-shaped grille that blended into the painted radiator shell, a radiator cap hidden under the hood, and skirts on the front and rear fenders for a more streamlined look. Fisher no-draft individually controlled vent windows were a new standard feature. Sales fell further to 953 cars.

The 1934 Series 370D was restyled yet again but this time was mounted on a completely new chassis. The radiator grille slanted rearward with a central bar and five horizontal sections, the windshield sloped even more rearward, headlights were enclosed in new teardrop housings mounted on streamlined supports, the horns joined the radiator cap under the hood, the spare tire was concealed under a new beaver tail deck on most models and the whole car sat approximately 2 inches (51 mm) lower. Significant mechanical advancements included dual X-frame chassis construction, "Knee-Action" front coil spring suspension that greatly reduced unsprung weight and Hotchkiss steering. The 1935 Series 370E saw the addition of the Fisher Turret Top on Fisher bodied cars and an increase in horsepower to 150. Sales over the two years combined totaled only 1098.

== Series 80/85 (1936–1937) ==
Series 80/85
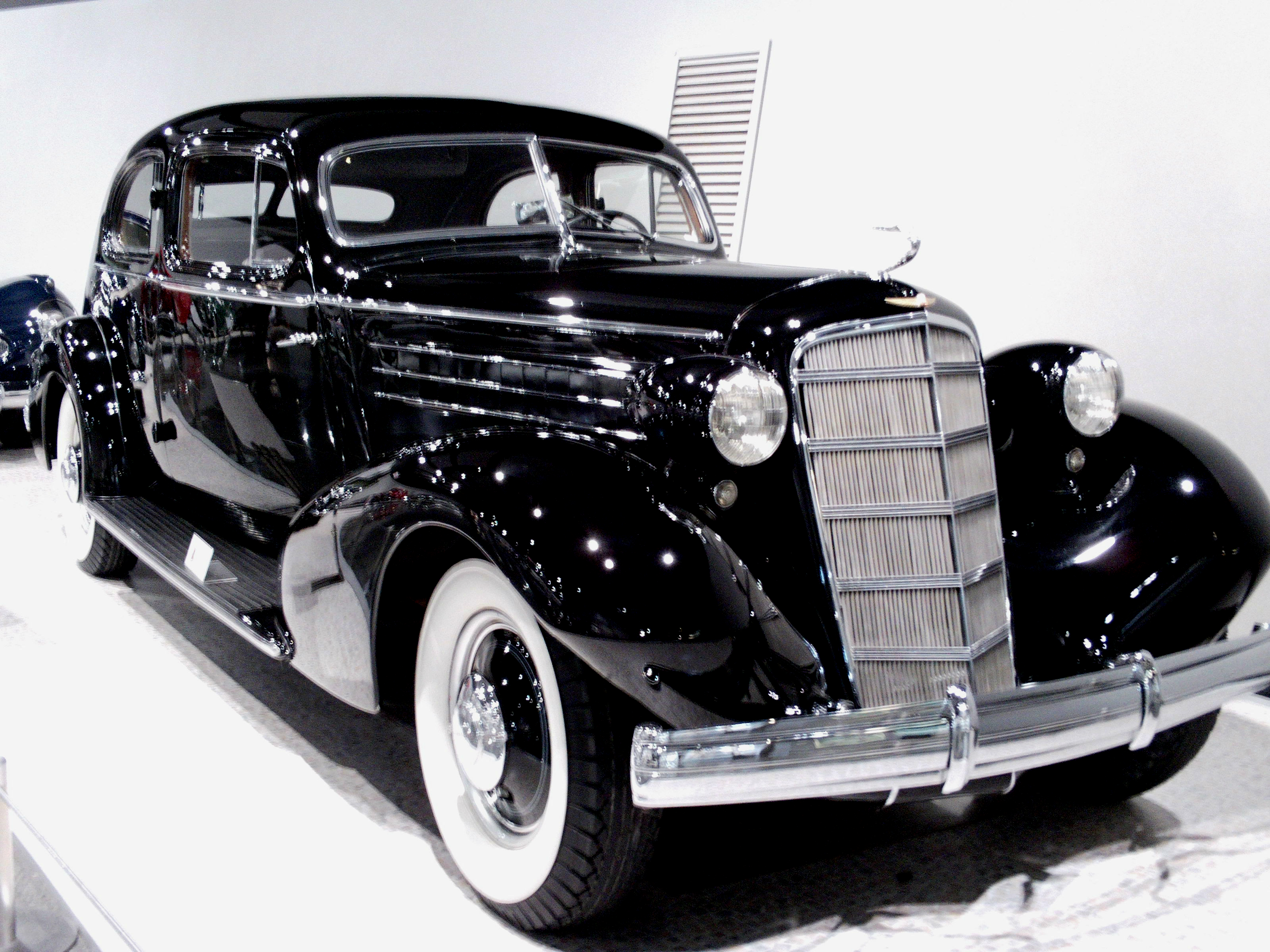

Overview
- Model years: 1936–1937

Body and chassis
- Platform: Series 80: C-body; Series 85: D-body
- Related: Series 80: Cadillac Series 70; Buick Roadmaster Series 85: Cadillac Series 90; Cadillac Series 75; Buick Limited

Dimensions
- Wheelbase: Series 80: 131.0 in (3,327 mm); Series 85: 138.0 in (3,505 mm); Commercial: 156.0 in (3,962 mm)
- Length: Series 80: 206.3 in (5,240 mm); 1936 Series 85: 213.5 in (5,420 mm); 1937 Series 85: 215.9 in (5,480 mm)
- Width: 74.4 in (1,890 mm)
- Height: 69.5 in (1,770 mm)
- Curb weight: 4,900–5,500 lb (2,200–2,500 kg)

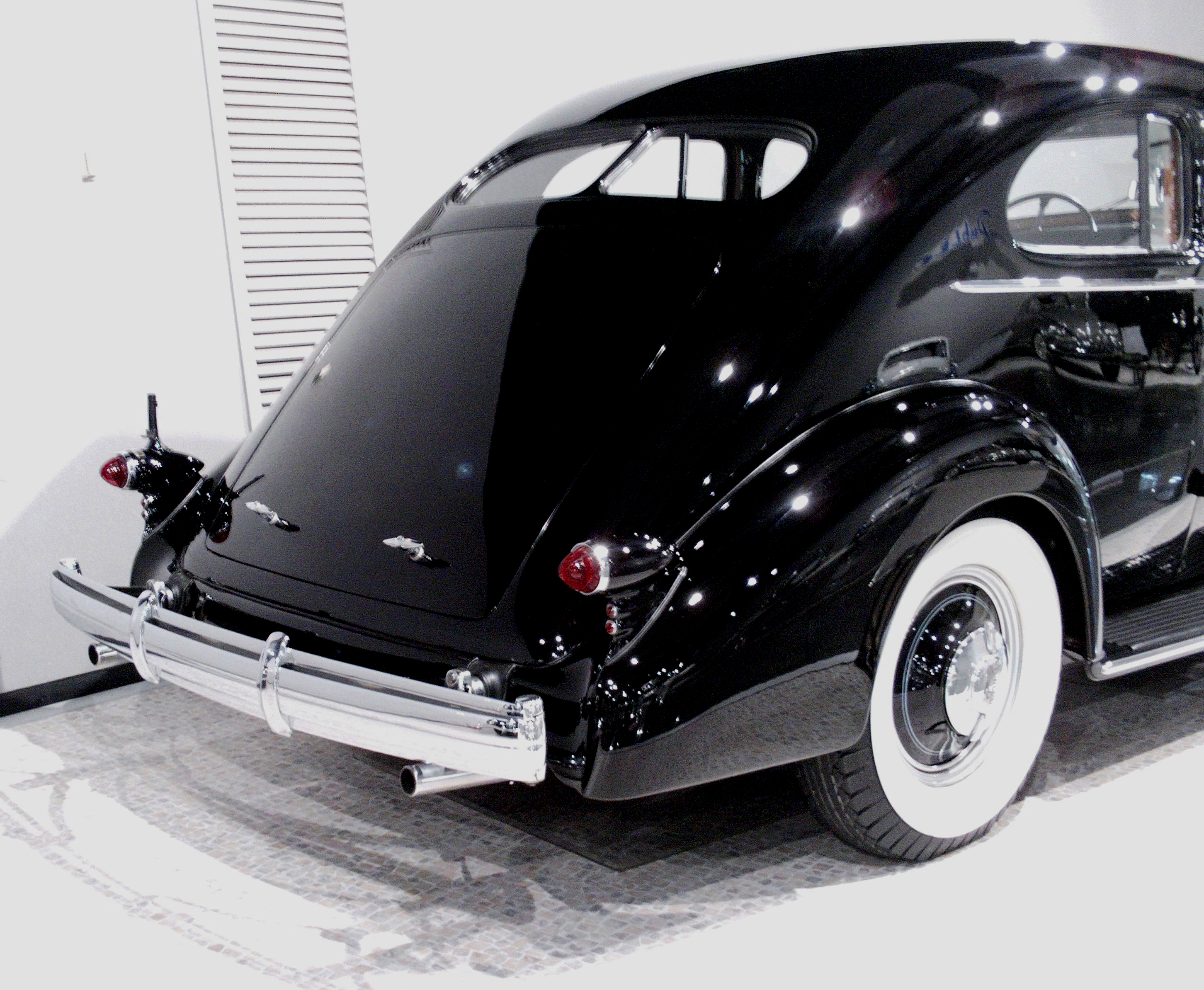
Cadillac Series 85 Aero Coupe back

The Cadillac V-12 was renamed the Series 80 and 85 in 1936. The Series 80 and 85 featured a 131-inch and 138-inch wheelbase respectively. All V-12s were then Fleetwood bodied and had Turret Tops. A total of 901 V-12s were sold in 1936.

In 1937 the Series 80 was dropped leaving only the long wheelbase Series 85. The only significant mechanical changes were the adoption of an oil-bath air cleaner and a pressure radiator cap. Sales were only 478. The Series 85 was discontinued at the end of 1937.

== Later developments ==
As part of the General Motors V-Future program, Cadillac had an overhead cam V-12 slated for production in the late 1960s. The program led to a fiberglass mockup of a V-12 powered Eldorado coupe that remained hidden from public view until an article appeared in Special Interest Autos in 1984.

Reports of new V-12 developments reappeared in the late 1980s. Cadillac showed the fully working Cadillac Solitaire concept in 1989, equipped with a Lotus-designed 6.6 liter DOHC 48-valve V-12 with multiport fuel injection.

A Northstar-based V-12 was featured in the Cadillac Cien concept car of 2001, and tested by Cadillac engineers as an engine for a Cadillac Escalade with somewhat improved performance. An AutoWeek report in 2007 claimed a V-12 in the design phase was to be based on the High Feature V6.

The Cadillac Sixteen concept utilized an all-aluminium pushrod V-16 engine based on the same architecture as GM's then-current small-block V-8 developments. A production version with a base V-8 and the option of the V-12 engine was planned, but was never approved for production and was ultimately shelved around 2008.
