= Cadillac V16 engine =

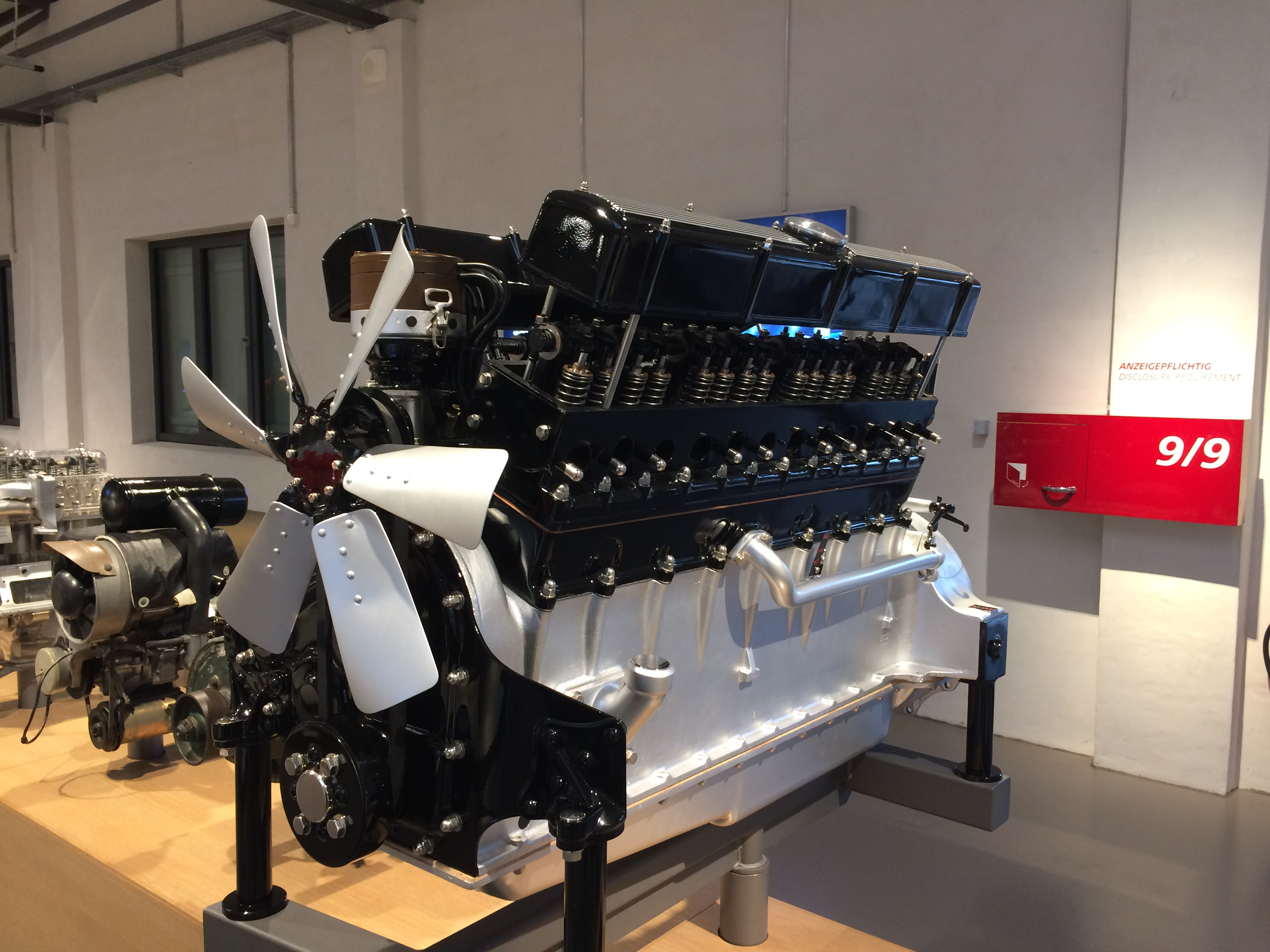
Series 452 engine in the Deutsches Technikmuseum Berlin

The Cadillac V16 engine is a term that applies to two different Cadillac-designed V16 automobile engines, an overhead valve 45-degree 452 cu in (7.4 L) model produced between 1930 and 1937, and a 135-degree side valve 431 cu in (7.1 L) between 1938 and 1940. Both were used in its most luxurious model line, the Cadillac V16.

Cadillac produced two of only four production gasoline-fueled V16 engines in history. The company has twice since attempted to build a new V16 engine, once in the 1980s and again in 2003 (the Cadillac Sixteen), neither making it into production.

== Series 452 ==
Cadillac Series 452

Overview
- Manufacturer: Cadillac
- Production: 1930-1937

Layout
- Configuration: 45° V16 with 5-bearing crankshaft
- Displacement: 452 cu in (7,410 cc)
- Cylinder bore: 3 in (76 mm)
- Piston stroke: 4 in (100 mm)
- Valvetrain: OHV
- Compression ratio: 5.3:1

Combustion
- Fuel system: 2 single barrel carburetors
- Fuel type: gasoline
- Oil system: wet sump
- Cooling system: water cooled

Output
- Power output: 165 hp (123 kW) between 3200 and 3400 rpm (1930)
- Specific power: 22.3 bhp/liter
- Torque output: 271 lb⋅ft (367 N⋅m)

Chronology
- Successor: Cadillac Series 90

With its competitor, Packard, already having sold a V12 engine to compete with Cadillac's eight-cylinder cars, work began late in the 1920s to produce a competitive multi cylinder luxury car. Lawrence Fisher, Cadillac General Manager, leaked to the press that the company would also build a V12, hoping to keep the real engine secret.

The first generation Cadillac V16 is functionally two overhead valve Straight-8 engine engines on a common crankshaft and aluminum crankcase. The independent cylinder blocks and heads meet at a 45° bank angle. Engineering features included a counterweighted crankshaft, overhead valves, and hydraulic lash adjusters. It also had two single barrel updraft carburetors, one for each bank.

The V16 had a 3 in (76 mm) bore and a 4 in (100 mm) stroke, giving an engine displacement of 452 cubic inches (7.4 L) and is known as the Series 452 engine. Cadillac initially rated the engine at 165 bhp (123 kW). V16 equipped cars were capable of speeds in excess of 80 mph (130 km/h), to 100 mph (160 km/h) depending on rear axle gear ratio.

In all, 3878 Series 452s were built.

This engine was used in the various V16 models:

- 1930–1934 Series 452 ("A" through "C")
- 1935 Series 60
- 1936–1937 Series 90

== Series 90 ==
Cadillac Series 90

Overview
- Manufacturer: Cadillac
- Production: 1938-1940

Layout
- Configuration: 135° V16 with 9-bearing crankshaft
- Displacement: 431 cu in (7,060 cc)
- Cylinder bore: 3 1/4 in (82.6 mm)
- Piston stroke: 3 1/4 in (82.6 mm)
- Cylinder block material: iron
- Cylinder head material: iron
- Valvetrain: Side valve

Combustion
- Fuel system: 2 single barrel carburetors
- Fuel type: gasoline
- Oil system: wet sump
- Cooling system: water cooled

Output
- Power output: 185 bhp (138 kW)

Chronology
- Predecessor: Cadillac Series 452

The second generation of V16 was known as the Series 90, as was the 1938-1940 Series 90 cars that used them. A sidevalve design, it used an unusually wide vee-angle of 135°, giving a wide but much lower engine to suit the ever-lowering automobile styling. The two carburetors, one on each bank, and air cleaners were mounted on top of the engine block. Bore and stroke were "square", both being 3 1/4 in (82.6 mm), giving an overall displacement of 431 cubic inches (7.1 L). Power was rated at 185 bhp (138 kW), 20 more than the series 468 engine.

The "series 431" 1938-40 Cadillac V16 was one of the last new American auto engine designs prior to World War Two. As such, it incorporated some of the latest thinking. Nine main bearings provided a crankshaft main bearing support between each 135 degree opposing pair of cylinders. The square bore and stroke lowered piston speed and promoted crankshaft rigidity, no small matter for an engine with eight cylinders in line per cylinder bank. The side valve engine design was no handicap for the time because the era's typical top engine speed of 3400-3700 rpm provided little opportunity to exploit the high speed breathing efficiency of the more advanced overhead valve design. Hydraulic valve lifters promoted silent running and an absence of periodic adjustment. Unlike most cars of the era, an external oil filter safeguarded the precision valve lifters. Despite the use of side valves, the engine produced as much power as the prior 45 degree V16, and with much less complexity. The earliest engines produced featured an innovative friction wheel drive to the generator. This was soon replaced by a conventional V belt drive. Cadillac claimed that the 1938, 1939, and 1940 Series 90 Sixteen had the best performance of any production car in the world at the time and would accelerate 10-60 in high gear only in 16 seconds. The definitive engineering report on the 135 degree Cadillac V16 engine is "The Evolution of the Cadillac Sixteen engine," by E.W. Seaholm, in charge of Cadillac engine design. It was published by the industry journal "Automotive Industries," November 27, 1937.

== V12 ==
Cadillac V12

Overview
- Manufacturer: Cadillac
- Production: 1930-1937

Layout
- Configuration: 45° V12 with 4-bearing crankshaft
- Displacement: 368 cu in (6,030 cc)
- Cylinder bore: 3.125 in (79.4 mm)
- Piston stroke: 4 in (102 mm)
- Cylinder block material: iron
- Cylinder head material: iron
- Valvetrain: Overhead valve

Combustion
- Fuel system: 2 single barrel carburetors
- Fuel type: gasoline
- Oil system: wet sump
- Cooling system: water cooled

Output
- Power output: 135 bhp (101 kW)

Cadillac also built a Series 452 engine-derived V12 between 1930 and 1937. It was functionally the V16, less four cylinders. It retained the V16's 4 in (100 mm) stroke, but was bored out to 3.125 in (79.4 mm), giving it a displacement of 368 cu in (6,030 cc). Output was rated at 135 hp (101 kW) with two carburetors. As with the V16s, Cadillac V12 cars were designed to make a statement, so all engine wiring and plumbing was hidden from view.

The V12 was used in the Fleetwood-bodied V12 models:

- 1930–1935 Series 370 ("A" through "E")
- 1936–1937 Series 80/85

== Later developments ==
The Cadillac Sixteen concept debuted in 2003 utilized an all-aluminium pushrod V16 engine based on the same architecture as GM's then-current small-block V8 developments. A production version with a base V8 and the option of the V12 engine was planned, but was never approved for production and was ultimately shelved around 2008.
