= Cadillac Fleetwood =

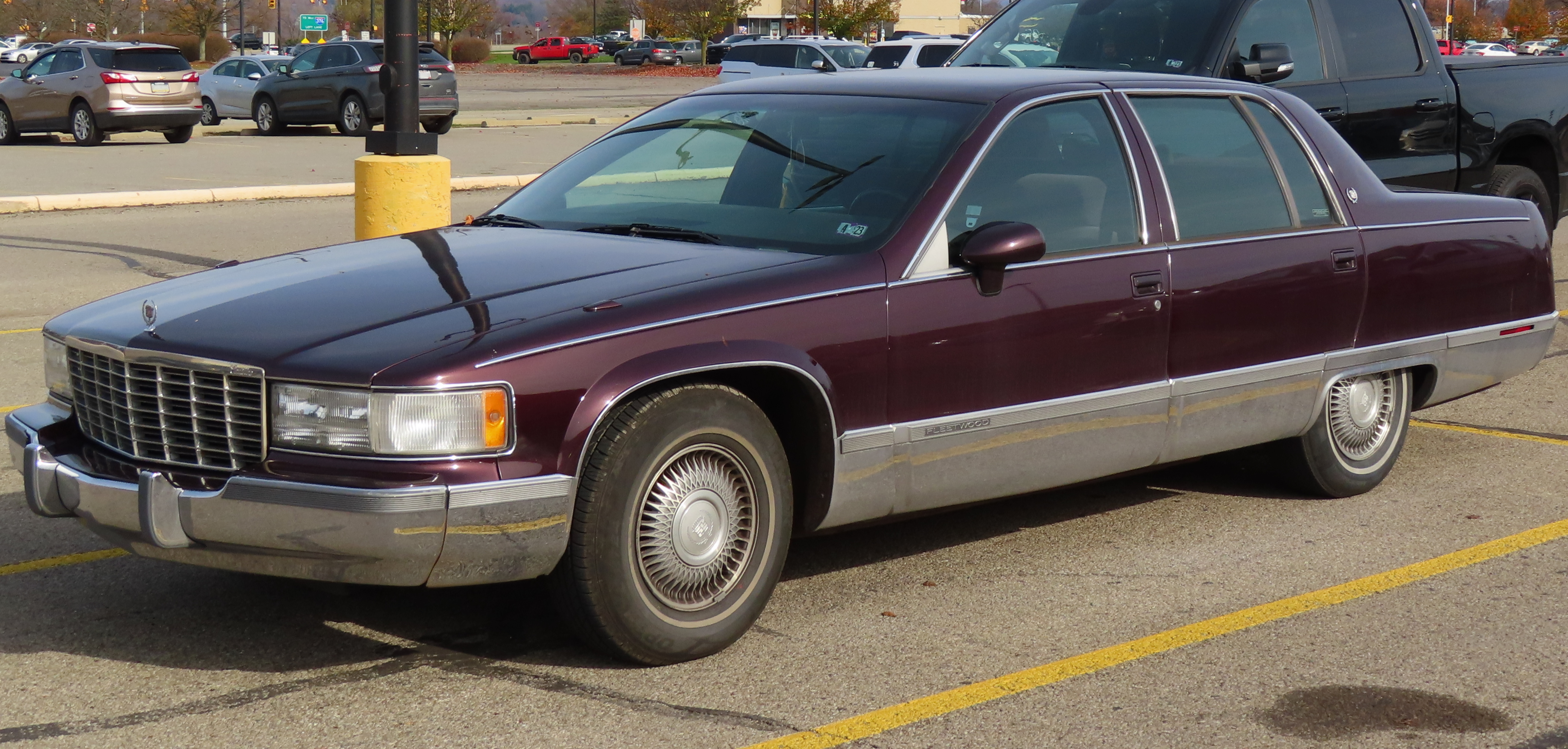
- 1994 Cadillac Fleetwood

Overview
- Manufacturer: General Motors
- Production: 1976–1996
- Model years: 1977–1996

Body and chassis
- Class: Full-size luxury car
- Layout: Transverse front-engine, front-wheel drive (1985–1992); FR layout (1993–1996)

Chronology
- Successor: Cadillac DTS, Cadillac CT6

The Cadillac Fleetwood is a full-size luxury sedan that was marketed by Cadillac from the 1977 through 1996 model years. Taking its nameplate from a coachbuilder historically associated with the General Motors division, the Cadillac Fleetwood became a stand-alone model line in 1985.

The first-generation Cadillac Fleetwood was introduced for 1985 as the division downsized its full-size C-body platform sedans to a front-wheel-drive layout. Slotted between the Sedan deVille and the Sixty Special, the Fleetwood also bridged the gap between the deVille and the D-body Fleetwood Brougham (Cadillac Brougham for 1987–1992). The second generation was introduced for 1993, replacing the Brougham as the D-body Cadillac sedan (the Fleetwood Brougham name became a trim option).

After the 1996 model year, Cadillac discontinued the Fleetwood line as GM ended production of full-size sedan lines in North America. General Motors consolidated Cadillac's large sedan lines into the deVille series and later as the Cadillac DTS. Since 1996, the only longer-wheelbase sedans produced by the division have been the Cadillac CT6 and Cadillac Celestiq.

== History of nameplate ==
=== Background (1916–1924) ===
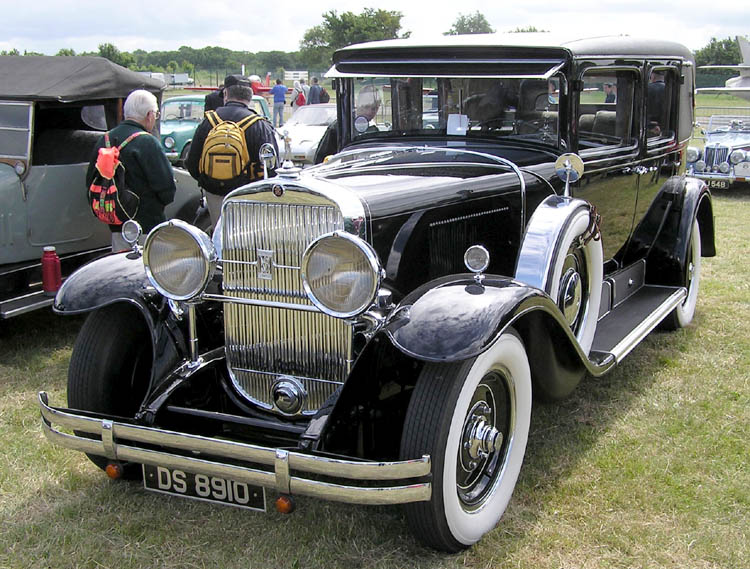
1929 Cadillac V8 series 341-B Imperial sedan or limousine, body by Fleetwood

Lawrence P. Fisher was one of the seven brothers most closely involved with Cadillac in its early years. In 1916, he joined the Fisher Body Company, which had been formed by two of his brothers in 1908. Larry (as people knew him) was instrumental among the Fisher brothers in bringing the Fisher enterprise under the General Motors umbrella in 1919. In May 1925, Alfred P. Sloan, then the head of General Motors, appointed Fisher as Cadillac General Manager, an office he retained through 1934. Fisher immediately went to work adding exclusive, custom bodies to the Cadillac range. Thus, he oversaw the purchase of the Fleetwood Metal Body Company by Fisher in September 1925.

The Fleetwood Body Company of Fleetwood, Pennsylvania, was founded by Harry Urich in the nineteenth century. It began as a small community of craftsmen founded by Henry Fleetwood, Esq. of Penwortham, near Lancaster, England (the Fleetwood family flourished in England in the 17th and 18th centuries). The traditions of 300 years of coach-building that Fleetwood applied to its work on cars secured it a high reputation in automobile circles worldwide by the 1920s. Coachwork was built by Fleetwood for various other luxury makes through 1924.

After the Fisher Body Corporation purchased the Fleetwood Body Company in 1925, Fleetwood bodies were reserved exclusively for Cadillac. By 1929, GM had purchased the remaining shares of Fisher to became the sole owner of both companies. From 1927 through 1934, all Cadillac series offered Fleetwood bodies as an option.

=== Fleetwood-bodied Cadillacs (1935–1985) ===
After 1934, Cadillac became more selective in offering Fleetwood bodies for its chassis. By 1938, the only way to obtain a Fleetwood-bodied car was by buying a Cadillac Series 75 or 90, as even the Cadillac Sixty Special had a Fisher body in its inaugural year. The Fleetwood script and crest would not be on the exterior of any Cadillac until the 1947 model year when it appeared on the rear deck lid of the Sixty Special. By 1952, it also appeared on the rear deck lid of the Series 75. In 1957, the Cadillac Series 70 Eldorado Brougham joined the Sixty Special and the Series 75 as the only Cadillac models with Fleetwood bodies, although Fleetwood script or crests did not appear anywhere on the exterior of the car. This was the first time in 20 years that a Fleetwood bodied car was paired with the Brougham name.

The Eldorado Brougham featured Fleetwood branded wheel discs and doorsill moldings when production was shifted in 1959 from the Cadillac Fleetwood plant in Detroit to Pininfarina in Turin, Italy. The identification was included presumably because of the design work since the final details for the car were still being done by Fleetwood.

Production of the Eldorado Brougham ended in 1961, but in 1963 the Eldorado Biarritz became Fleetwood bodied and acquired Fleetwood crests on its rear quarters and rocker panel moldings. The 1963 Eldorado Biarritz was also the first Fleetwood bodied convertible since the Cadillac Series 75 stopped offering four-door and two-door convertible body styles and production of the Cadillac Series 90 ceased in 1941.

In 1965, the Eldorado, Sixty Special, and Series 75 models were designated as Fleetwood "subseries", and this would continue through the 1972 model year. During this period, there was not a separate Fleetwood series. However, Fleetwood became a much more integral part of a Cadillac series name in 1977 with the introduction of the Cadillac Fleetwood Brougham and the Cadillac Fleetwood Limousine, which replaced the Fleetwood Sixty Special Brougham and the Fleetwood 75 respectively. In 1985, Fleetwood became a separate series.

== Front-wheel drive (C-body; 1985–1992) ==
First generation
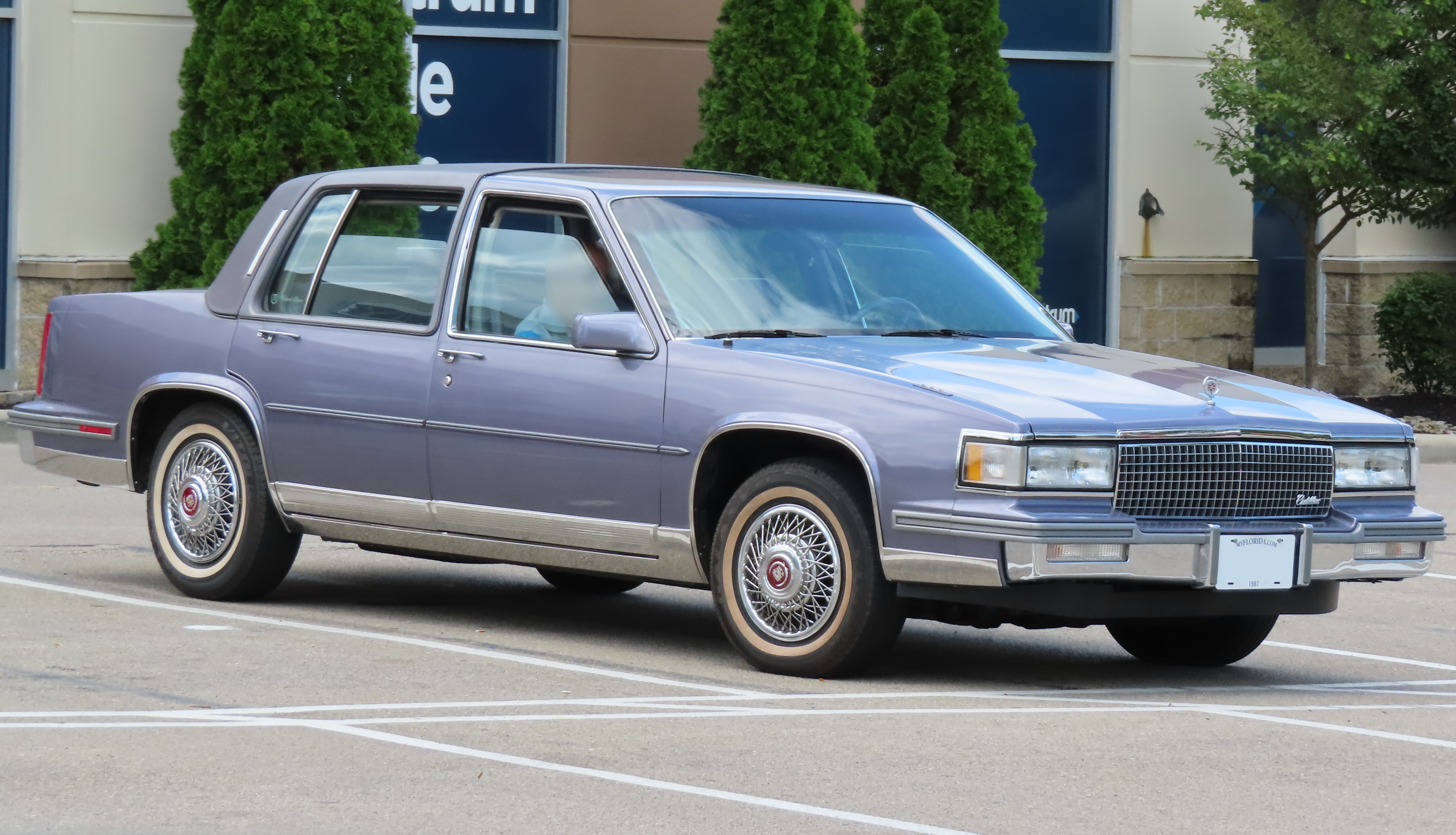
- 1987 Cadillac Fleetwood d'Elegance

Overview
- Model years: 1985–1992
- Assembly: Lake Orion, Michigan, U.S. (Orion Assembly)
- Designer: Irv Rybicki

Body and chassis
- Body style: 4-door sedan 2-door coupe
- Layout: Transverse front-engine, front-wheel-drive
- Platform: C-body
- Related: Cadillac Sixty Special; Cadillac DeVille; Buick Electra; Buick Park Avenue; Oldsmobile 98

Powertrain
- Engine: 4.1 L HT-4100 V8; 4.5 L HT-4500 V8; 4.9 L HT-4900 V8; 4.3 L LS2 Diesel V6
- Transmission: 4-speed TH-440-T4 automatic 4-speed 4T60 automatic 4-speed 4T60E automatic

Dimensions
- Wheelbase: 1985–1988: 110.8 in (2,814 mm); 1989–1992 2-door: 110.8 in (2,814 mm); 1989–1992 4-door:113.8 in (2,891 mm)
- Length: 1985–1986: 195.0 in (4,953 mm); 1987–1988: 196.5 in (4,991 mm); 1989 2-door: 202.3 in (5,138 mm); 1989 4-door: 205.3 in (5,215 mm); 1990 2-door: 202.7 in (5,149 mm); 1991–1992 2-door: 202.6 in (5,146 mm); 1990–1992 4-door: 205.6 in (5,222 mm)
- Width: 1985–1988: 71.7 in (1,821 mm); 1989: 72.5 in (1,842 mm); 1990: 71.7 in (1,821 mm); 1991–1992: 73.4 in (1,864 mm)
- Height: 1985–1989: 55.0 in (1,397 mm); 1990–1992 2-door: 54.9 in (1,394 mm); 1990–1992 4-door: 55.2 in (1,402 mm)
- Curb weight: 3,500–3,900 lb (1,588–1,769 kg)

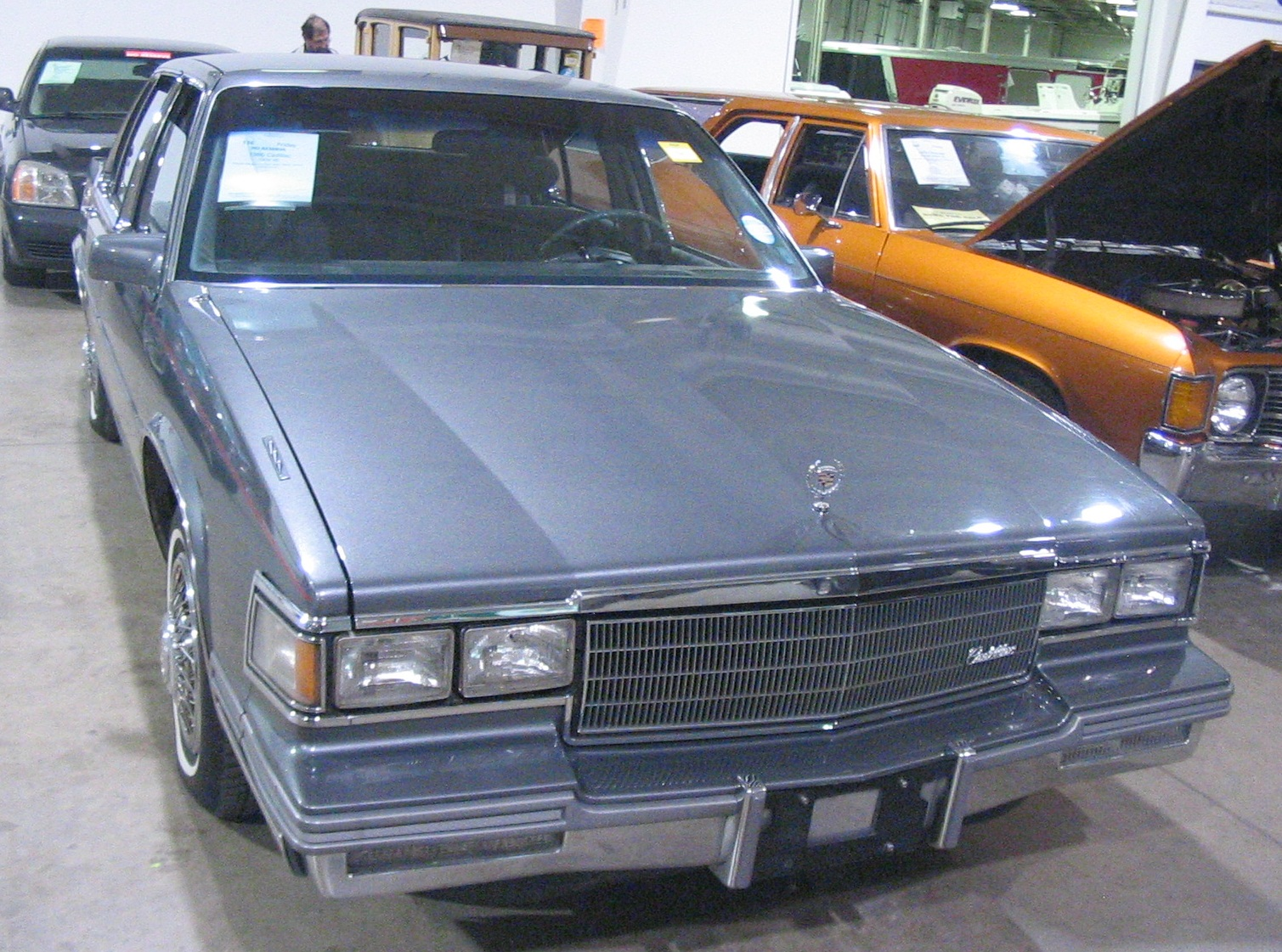
1986 Cadillac Fleetwood

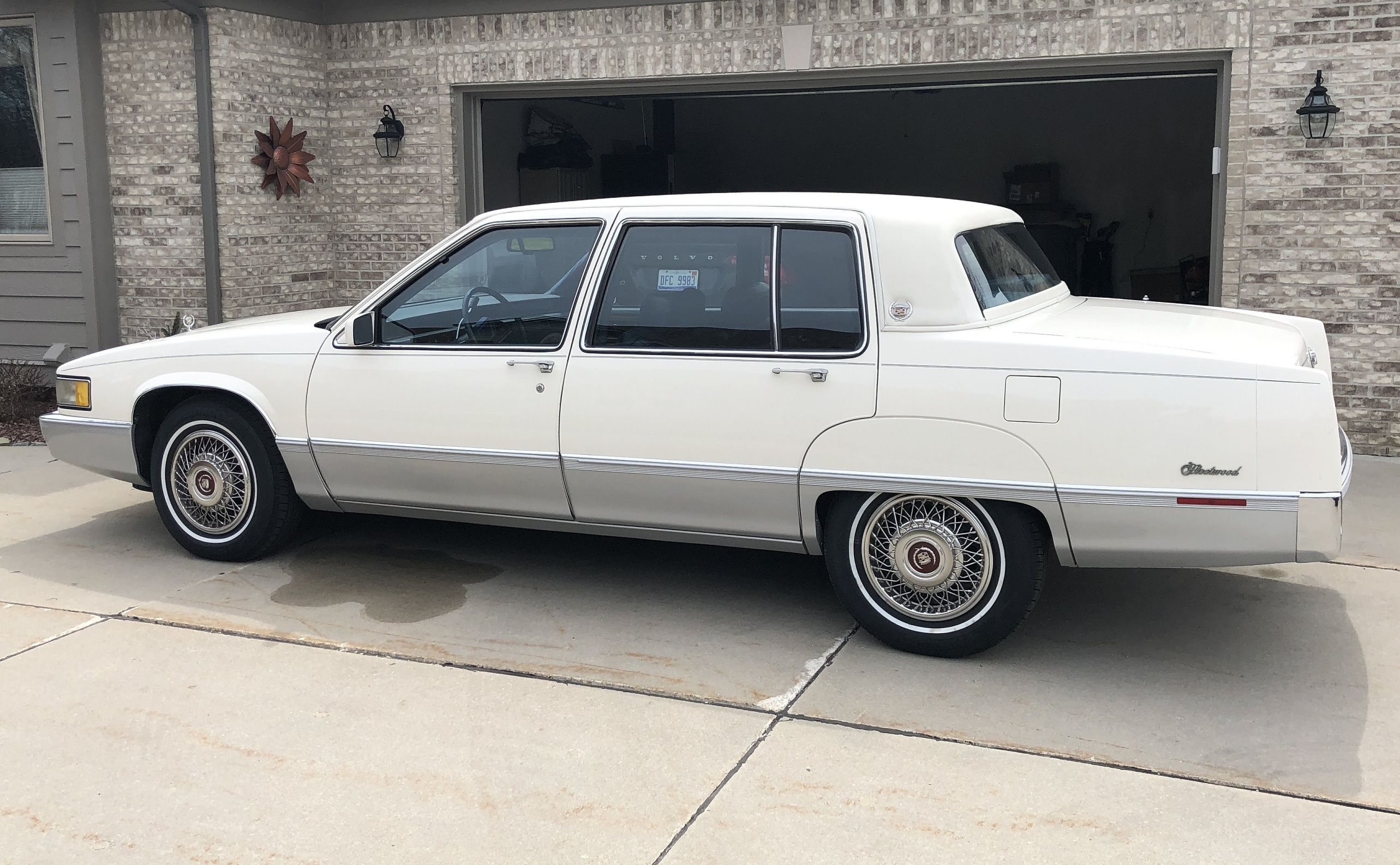
1989 Cadillac Fleetwood Sedan

In 1985, Fleetwood models used a new front-wheel-drive C-body platform, sharing the 110.8 inches (2,810 mm) wheelbase with GM's other C-body cars, the DeVille, Buick Electra, and Oldsmobile Ninety-Eight. The Fleetwood Brougham continued to use the RWD platform, (which was redesignated as "D-body" for 1985) through 1986.

As had been the case since the 1977 model year, there were little more than trim differences between the Fleetwood and the DeVille. For 1985, the Fleetwood was actually a de Ville trim option, rather than a separate model. The optional d'Elegance package, added tufted-button seating among other niceties for the FWD Fleetwood sedan. The Fleetwood coupe had been dropped after the 1986 model year, but returned in 1989. The Fleetwood coupe for 1989–1992 was not popular with model year production in 1989: 4,108, 1990: 2,438, 1991: 894, and for 1992: a mere 443.

Cadillac offered the Fleetwood Sixty Special for model years 1987–1988, using a stretched 115.8 inches (2,940 mm) version of the new C-body platform – as well as the Fleetwood Series 75 for model years 1985–1987, using a 134.4 inches (3,410 mm) stretched version of the same platform. The aluminum 4.1 L HT-4100 V8 was replaced by the 4.5 L HT-4500 for 1988. The engine displacement was increased for 1991 to the 4.9 L HT-4900.

The Fleetwood line was redesigned for the 1989 model year to include skirted rear wheels. The Fleetwood coupe remained on the 110.8 in (2,810 mm) wheelbase, while the sedan's wheelbase increased by 3 inches (76 millimetres). The slightly revised Fleetwood coupe, with extended front and rear styling, was sold from 1989 and ended in 1992.

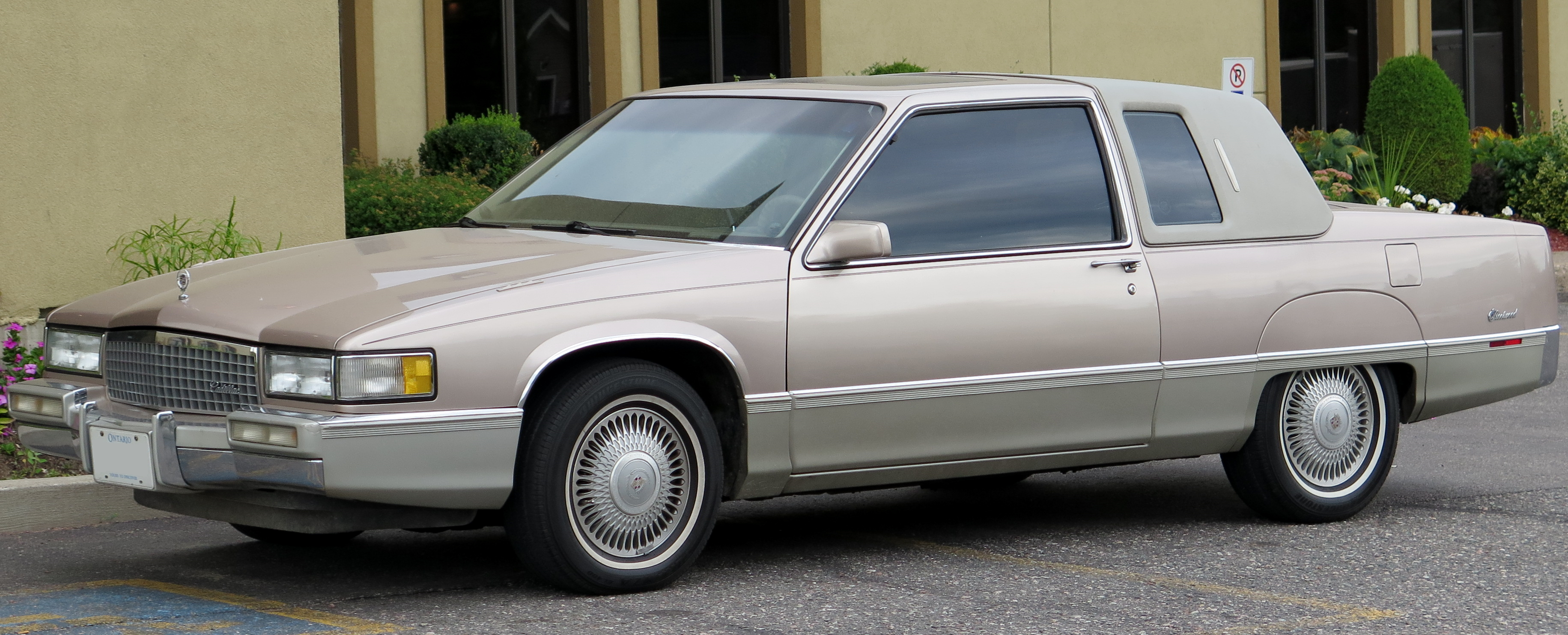

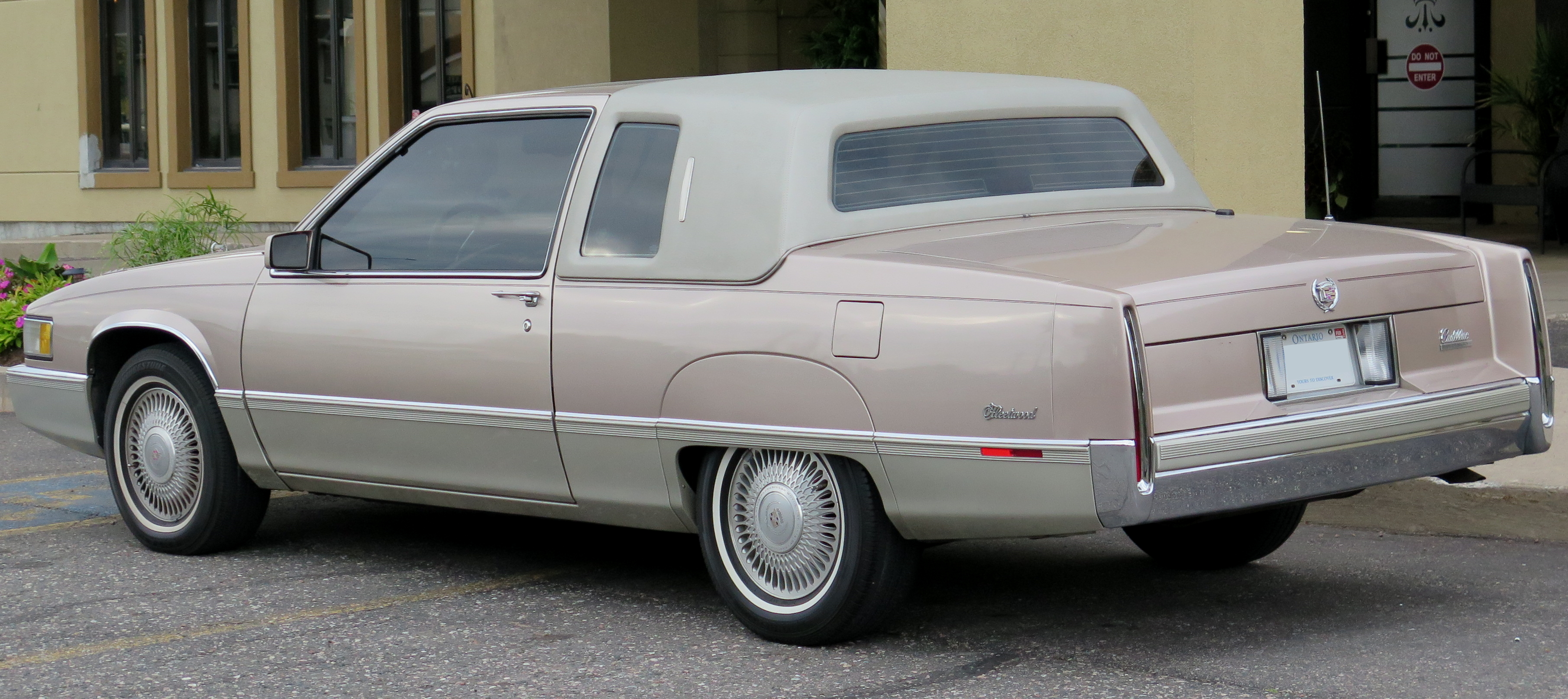
1990 Cadillac Fleetwood Coupe

Power was increased to 180 hp (134 kW) from the same 4.5 L engine for 1990 through the use of a dual-stage intake manifold and other changes. It was replaced by the 200 hp (149 kW) 4.9 L HT-4900 for 1991.

The Fleetwood nameplate departed the front-drive lineup for 1993 (as Fleetwood was transferred to the new rear-drive replacement for the 1992 Brougham). Instead, the Sixty Special nameplate was used on the front-wheel-drive model for 1993. A total of 5,292 Sixty Specials were built during 1993, including 688 with the optional "Ultra" package that featured “22-way” adjustable front seats, designed in Italy by Giorgetto Giugiaro. This seating package had been standard on the Sixty Special since 1989, but in 1993, it became a $3,550 option. While it was based upon the DeVille, the Sixty Special included eleven items as standard equipment, while those eleven items were optional at extra cost on DeVilles. There were options for the Sixty Special, that were unavailable on the DeVille, such as "Memory Seat" for the driver with two recall settings, an "Exit" button" when pushed automatically powered the driver seat all the way rearward, and dual front seat power recliners.

Both the Fleetwood and DeVille were coded as C-bodies in the fourth digit of the VIN. The fifth digit coded the DeVille as "D" (with the later Touring Sedan becoming "T"), the Fleetwood as "B", and the Fleetwood Sixty Special as "S". The Sixty Special became the "G" code for 1991, and switched back to "B" for its 1993 run.

Transmissions included the THM440 T4 (1985–1986), the 4T60 (1987–1989), and the 4T60E (1990–1993).

Engines
Displacement	Power at rpm	Torque at rpm
249.4 cu in (4,087 cc) HT-4100 V8	125 hp (93 kW) at 4200	190 lb⋅ft (258 N⋅m) at 2200
272.6 cu in (4,467 cc) HT-4500 V8	155 hp (116 kW)	
272.6 cu in (4,467 cc) HT-4500 V8	180 hp (134 kW)	
298.6 cu in (4,893 cc) HT-4900 V8	200 hp (149 kW)	275 lb⋅ft (373 N⋅m)
262.5 cu in (4,302 cc) LS2 V6	85 hp (63 kW) at 3600	165 lb⋅ft (224 N⋅m) at 1600

== Rear-wheel drive (D-body; 1993–1996) ==
Second generation
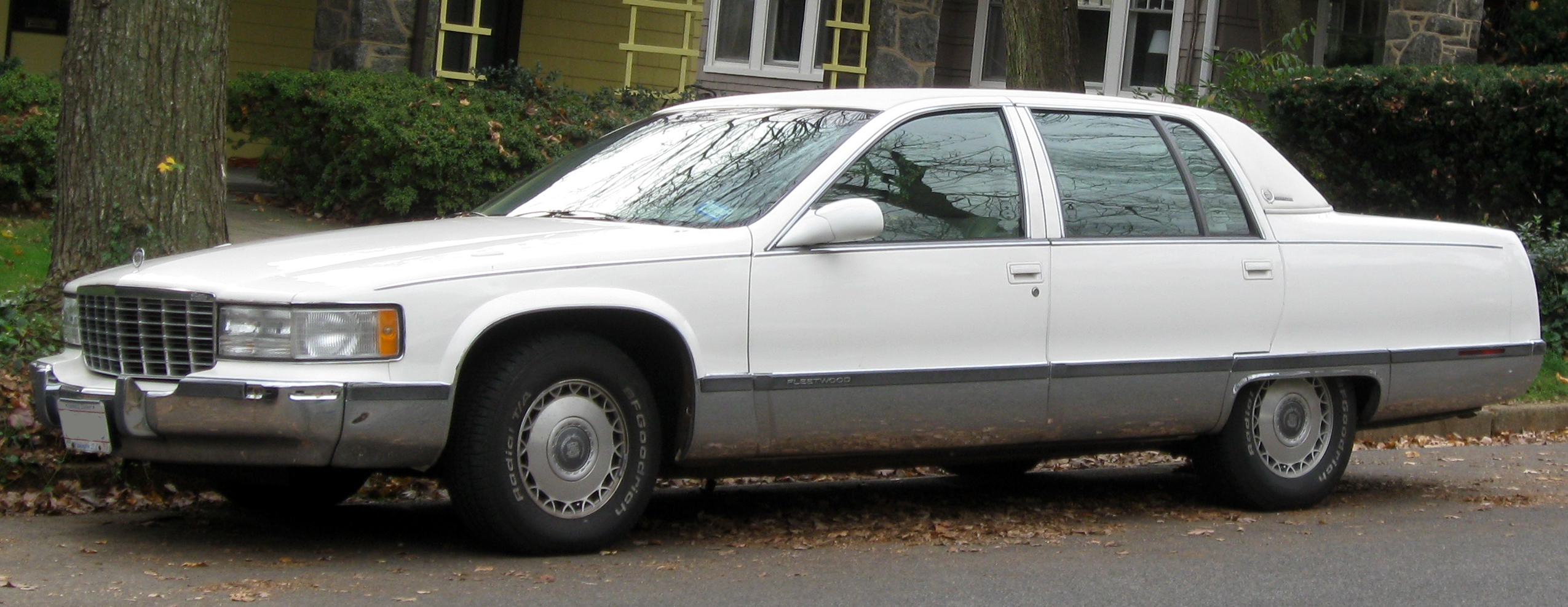
- Fleetwood Brougham

Overview
- Model years: 1993–1996
- Assembly: Arlington, Texas, U.S. (Arlington Assembly)
- Designer: Chuck Jordan

Body and chassis
- Body style: 4-door sedan
- Layout: FR layout
- Platform: D-body
- Related: Buick Roadmaster; Chevrolet Caprice; Chevrolet Impala SS; Oldsmobile Custom Cruiser

Powertrain
- Engine: 5.7 L L05 V8; 5.7 L LT1 V8
- Transmission: 4-speed 4L60 automatic 4-speed 4L60E automatic

Dimensions
- Wheelbase: 121.5 in (3,086 mm)
- Length: 225.0 in (5,715 mm)
- Width: 78.0 in (1,981 mm)
- Height: 57.1 in (1,450 mm)
- Curb weight: 4,600–4,700 lb (2,087–2,132 kg)

Chronology
- Predecessor: Cadillac Brougham

For 1993, the Cadillac Fleetwood was reintroduced as a rear-wheel-drive sedan, replacing the 1987–1992 Brougham as the largest Cadillac sedan. As Cadillac revised its model range, the Fleetwood nameplate was no longer the companion model to the de Ville, and was dropped from the flagship Sixty Special series (itself retired after 1993). In contrast to many luxury-segment competitors, the 1993 Fleetwood had not only grown in size from its downsized predecessor, but was the first American vehicle line to shift from a rear-wheel-drive layout to front-wheel drive, reverting back to rear-wheel drive. Far larger than the Chrysler Imperial (and the later Chrysler LHS), the model line competed primarily against the Lincoln Town Car.

After the 1996 model year, Cadillac retired the Fleetwood model line, as General Motors ended production of its full-frame rear-wheel-drive sedans. The Arlington Assembly facility that assembled the Fleetwood and its Chevrolet/Buick counterparts was retooled to assemble full-size SUVs, later including the Cadillac Escalade and Cadillac Escalade ESV.

=== Body design ===
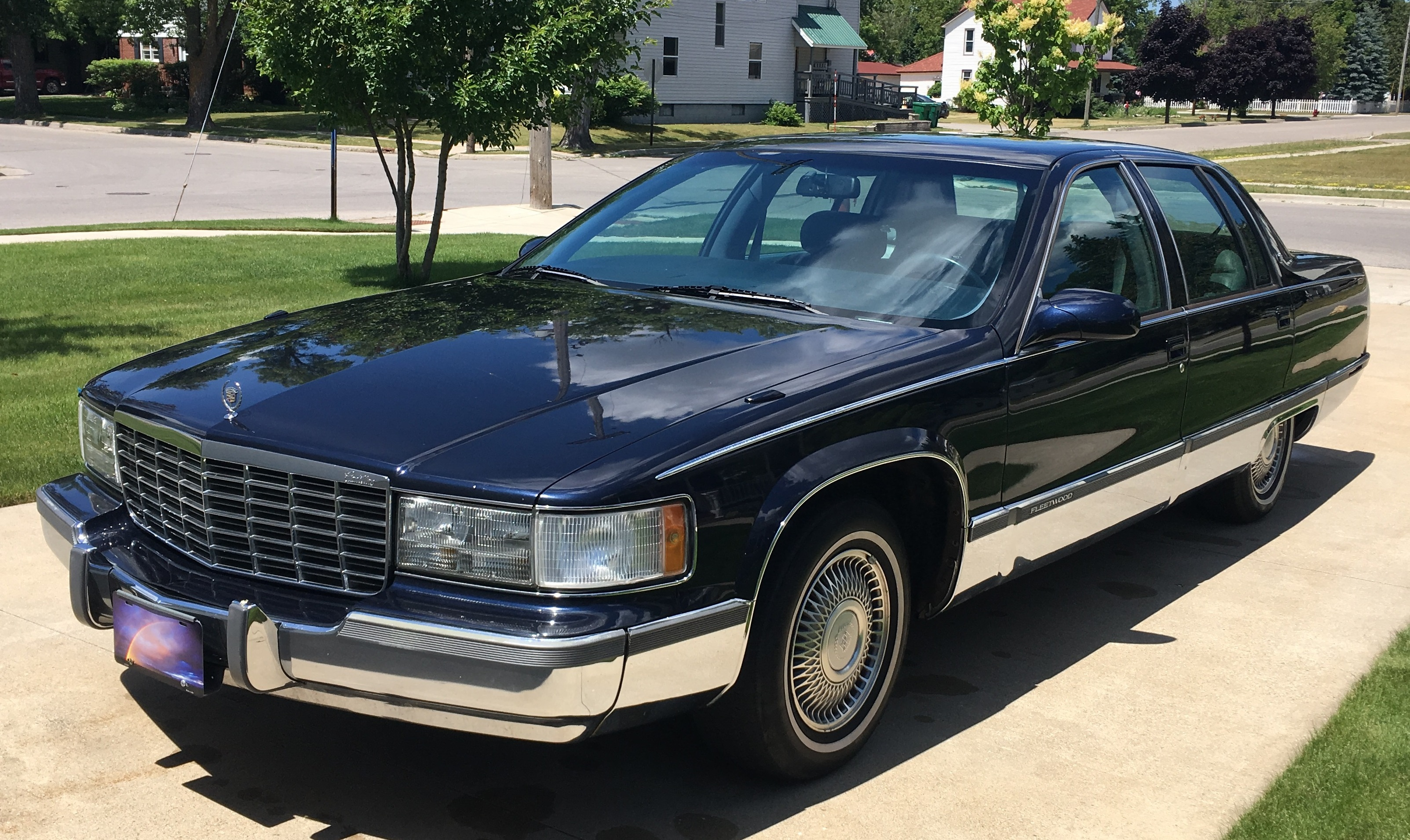
1995 Cadillac Fleetwood, vinyl top delete.

At the time of its production, the Fleetwood was the longest-length production car marketed in the United States, at 225 inches (5,715 mm) long. Sold exclusively as a four-door sedan (Cadillac dropped the rear-wheel-drive Fleetwood coupe after 1985), the Fleetwood grew four inches in length over the 1992 Brougham. Equipped with dual airbags as standard equipment, the 1993 Fleetwood marked the debut of the Cadillac "Airbank" SRS system, a wider passenger-side airbag designed to protect the right-side and center passenger riding in a front bench seat.

On hiatus since 1986, the Fleetwood Brougham nameplate returned, as Cadillac restored it as the flagship option package for the model line. Visibly distinguished by a full vinyl roof (which could be deleted), C-pillar and instrument panel badging, the Fleetwood Brougham also included model-specific seating designs for the six-way power seats (in either leather or Prestwick cloth) with three-position memory. The interior also included vanity mirrors for the rear seat and a rear-seat storage armrest.

Alongside the Fleetwood Brougham option package, the Fleetwood offered multiple options, including a CD player, full-size spare tire, chrome wheels, sliding glass moonroof (dubbed "Astro Roof"), and an onboard security system.

=== Chassis details ===
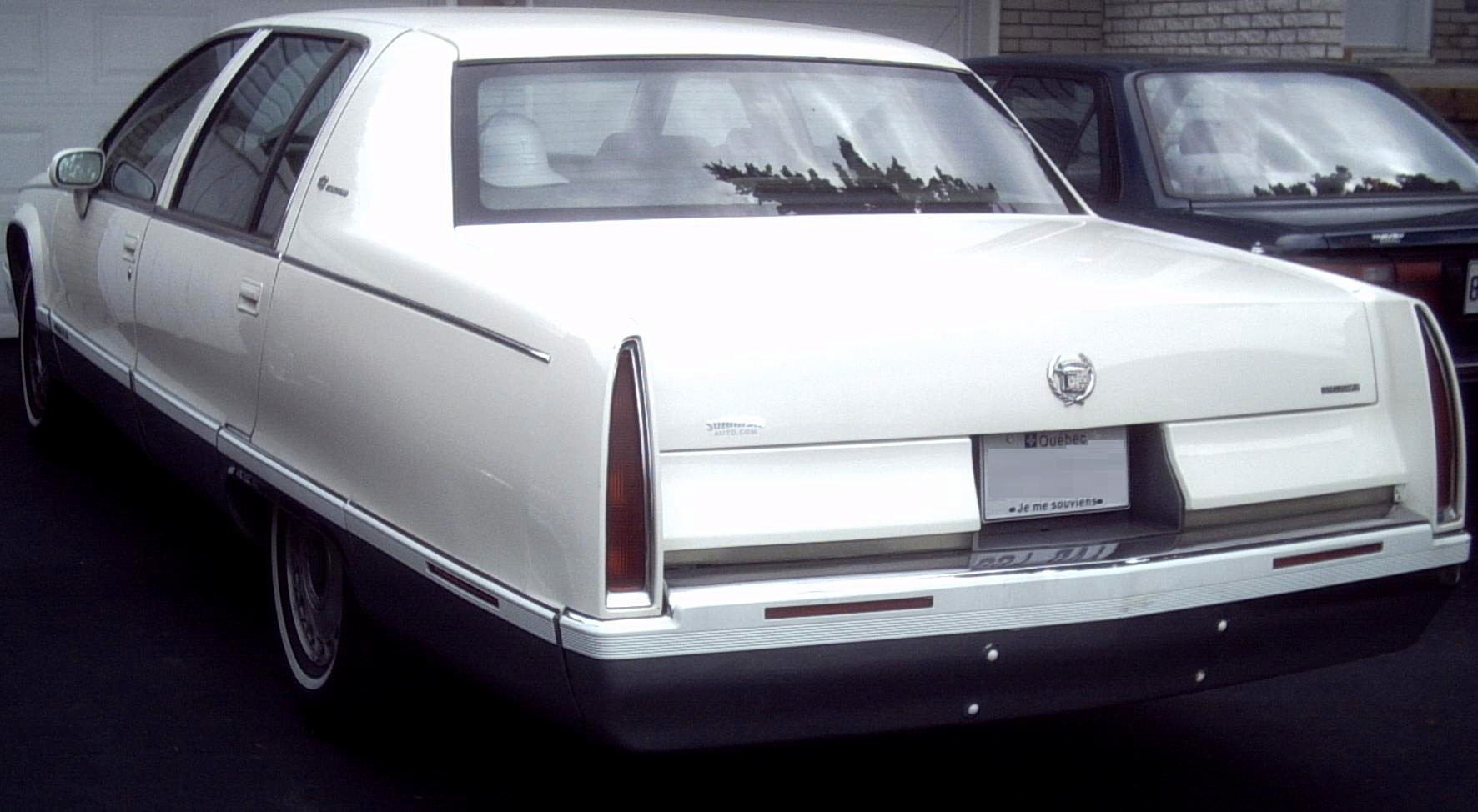
1993–1994 Cadillac Fleetwood, rear. The model line is among the final GM vehicles produced with a fuel-fill location behind the license plate.

The D-body Cadillac Fleetwood uses a body-on-frame chassis, retaining the 121.5-inch wheelbase of the 1977–1992 Cadillac C-body platform (Cadillac Fleetwood Brougham, Brougham, and 1977–1984 de Ville). Though fitted with a larger body and upgraded safety equipment, the 1993 Fleetwood saw only nominal weight increases, gaining only 90 pounds of curb weight over the 1992 Brougham.

In contrast to the traditional usage of the D-body designation (prior to 1985), which was reserved for Cadillac limousines and its partially bodied commercial chassis (for hearses and ambulances), the post-downsizing D-body code is used for the version of the full-size B-body chassis specific to the Cadillac division; along with common powertrains, the Fleetwood shares a small degree of bodywork with the Chevrolet Caprice and Buick Roadmaster (visibly, the front doors and windshield).

==== Powertrain details ====
For 1993, the Fleetwood carried over the 185hp 5.7L V8 used by the 1990–1992 Cadillac Brougham, paired with a four-speed 4L60 automatic transmission. For 1994, GM upgraded its full-size powertrains, with the D-body and B-body cars receiving a 260hp 5.7L LT1 V8, paired with an electronically controlled 4L60E four-speed automatic. Shared with the Chevrolet C4 Corvette and the Chevrolet Camaro/Pontiac Firebird, the LT1 engine used for full-size cars was detuned in horsepower output and fitted with cast-iron heads.

Engines
Displacement	Power	Torque
350 cu in (5.7 L) L05 V8	185 hp (138 kW)	304 lb⋅ft (412 N⋅m)
350 cu in (5.7 L) LT1 V8	260 hp (194 kW)	330 lb⋅ft (447 N⋅m)

==== Towing capability ====
While the previous-generation Brougham was offered with a factory-designed towing package, the option for the 1993 underwent a major capability increase; for the first time since the 1976 Sixty Special, a Cadillac sedan was factory-rated to tow 7,000 lb (3,200 kg).

Shared with the Buick Roadmaster station wagon, the RPO V4P package included heavy-duty cooling (RPO V08, which consisted of a seven-blade mechanical primary fan, a heavy-duty electrical secondary fan, and an extra capacity radiator), RPO FE2 Suspension System Ride Handling, HD 4L60 transmission, RPO KC4 Cooling System Engine Oil, RPO KD1 Cooling System Transmission Oil, RPO KG9 140 amp alternator, and RPO GT4 3.73 gears with an 8.5-inch ring gear.

In 1994–1996, the V4P package was revised with RPO GU6 3.42 gears with the new more powerful RPO LT1 260 hp (194 kW) V8, and HD 4L60E transmission with revised accumulators to shift smoother with the shorter rear axle gearing.

=== Sales ===
Though more popular than Buick, Oldsmobile, and Chevrolet full-size station wagons, the Cadillac Fleetwood is the lowest-produced 1990s D/B-body sedan. The model line largely struggled in sales against the Chrysler LHS and Lincoln Town Car (the latter, more closely matching the sales of the de Ville).

Production Figures
Year	Units
1993	31,773
1994	27,473
1995	16,180
1996	15,109
Total Production = 90,535

=== Cadillac Commercial Chassis ===
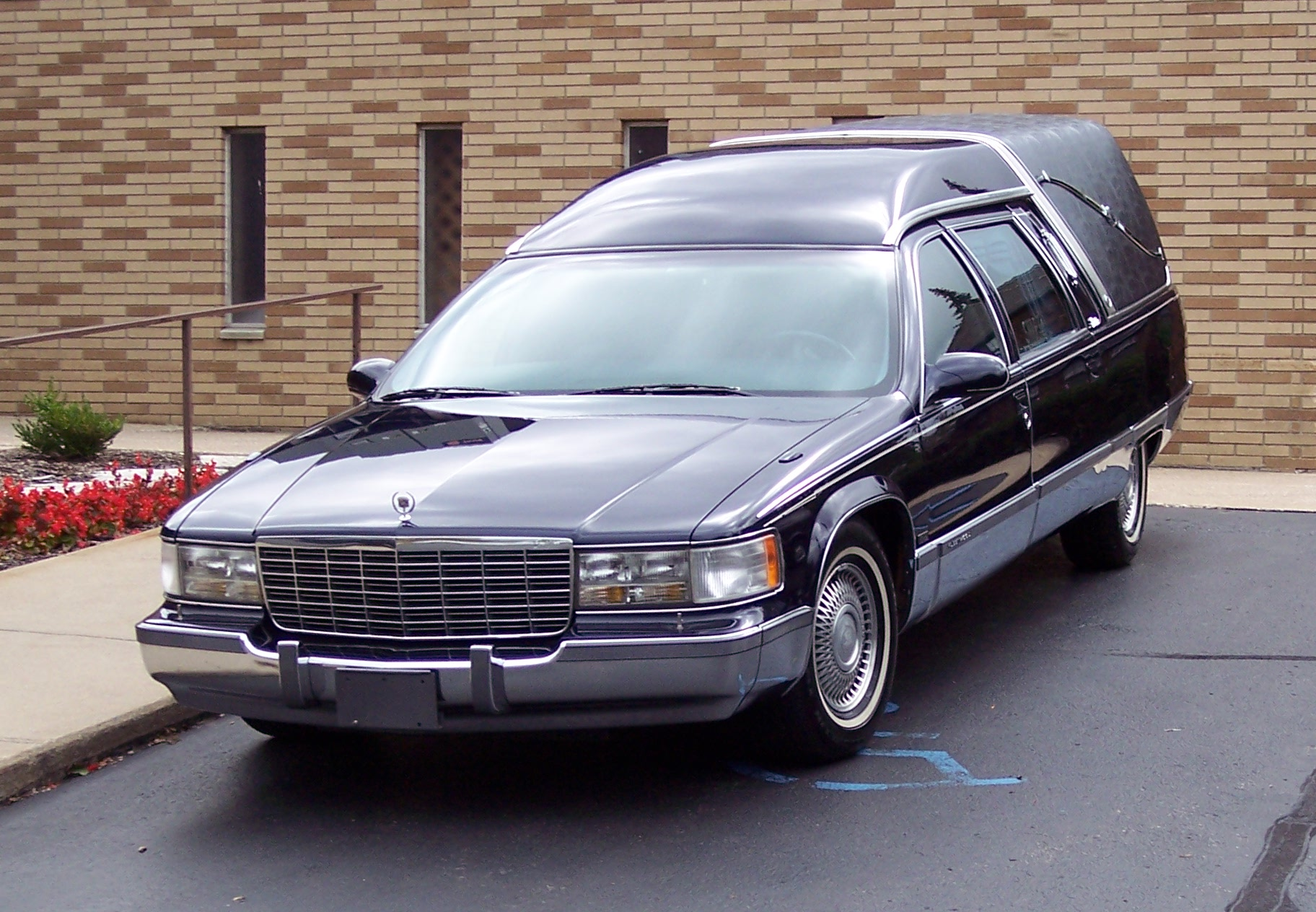
Hearse manufactured using a 1995–1996 Cadillac Fleetwood body

In its return to the D-body, the Fleetwood again supported the commercial chassis, an incomplete vehicle designed primarily for limousines and funeral coaches (hearses). The variant differed from the standard Fleetwood sedan as antilock brakes, traction control, and dual front airbags were not standard features.

Following the discontinuation of the Fleetwood as the final full-frame Cadillac sedan, Cadillac continued to supply the de Ville (and the product lines that replaced it) chassis to funeral coach manufacturers through second-party conversion. As of current production, the only body-on-frame Cadillacs produced since the 1996 Fleetwood are the Escalade, Escalade ESV, and Escalade EXT.

=== Presidential State Car (1993) ===
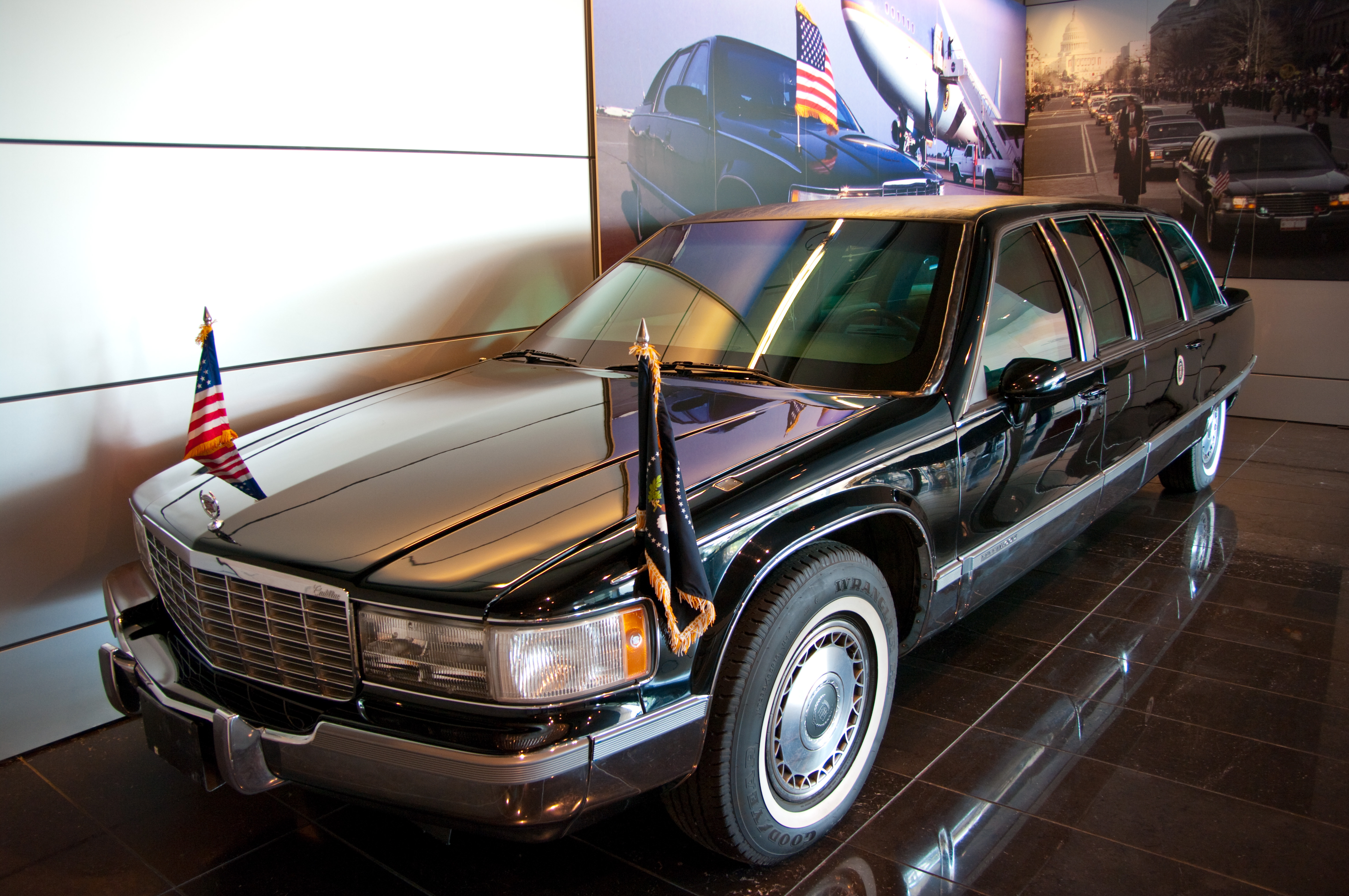
1993 Cadillac Fleetwood constructed as a presidential state car, on display in Clinton Presidential Center

In 1993, after president Bill Clinton took office, a then brand-new 1993 Fleetwood would become his state car that he would use throughout his term until 2001. Following a long tradition of Lincoln-based sedans, this was only the second Cadillac since the 1983 Fleetwood built for the Ronald Reagan administration. Along with advanced security and safety features, the limousine featured communication devices such as phones, satellite communications and the Internet. After Clinton left office, the car eventually was displayed at the Clinton Presidential Center in Little Rock, Arkansas. To prevent third parties from learning classified details about the protection and security features of the vehicle, the Secret Service keeps the doors secured at all times.

This Fleetwood would also prove to be the last presidential car derived from a regular production passenger car. The production 2001 Cadillac de Ville (built for George W. Bush) was not regarded as suitable for conversion, so the final vehicle was constructed using the chassis and powertrain of a heavy-duty GM SUV, using little more than the front and rear bodywork of the de Ville.
