= Brougham (car body) =

Car body

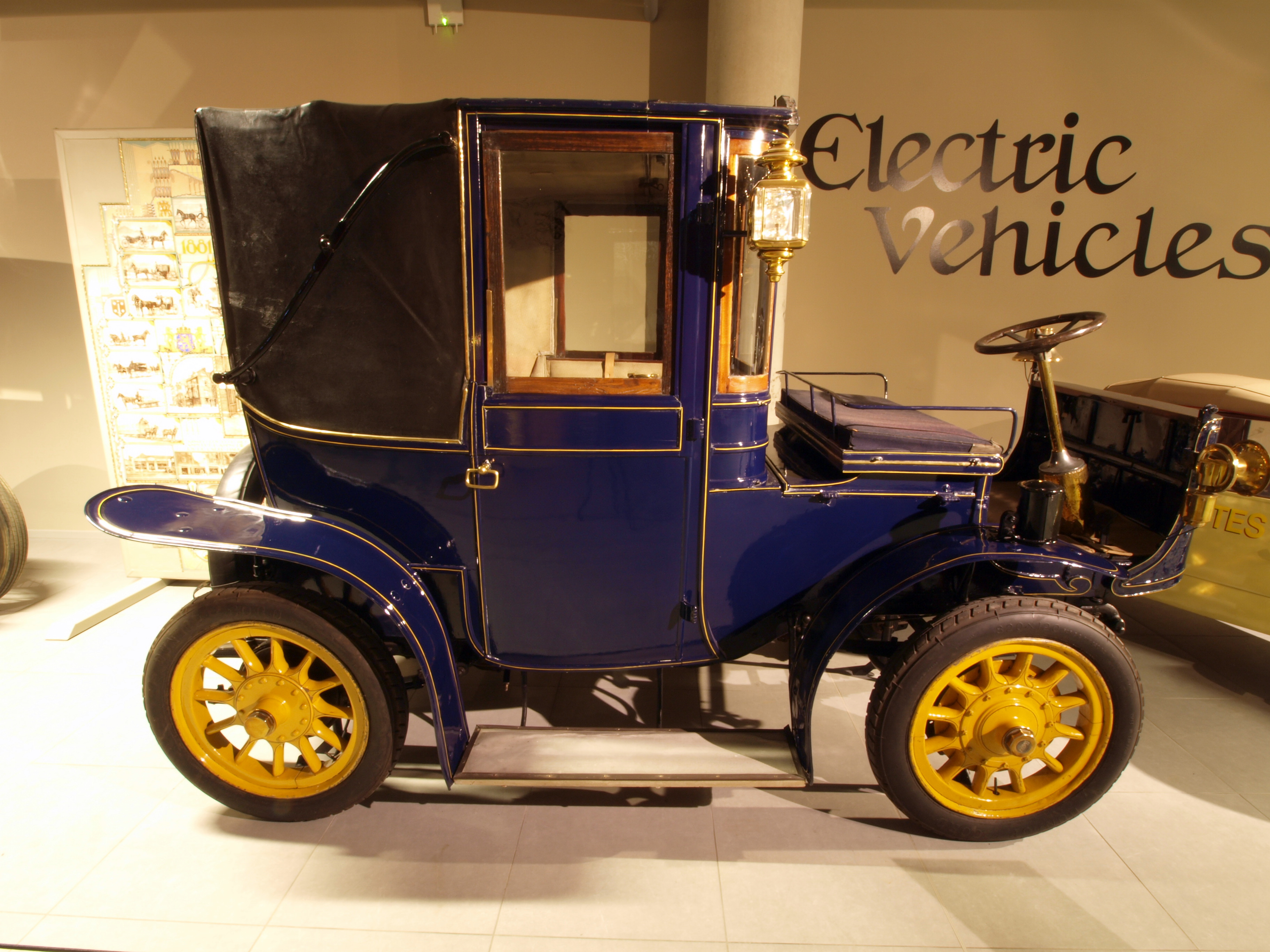
1905 Hedag Electric Brougham, similar in style to a brougham carriage

A brougham (/ˈbruːm, ˈbruːəm, ˈbroʊm, ˈbroʊəm/) was originally a car body style where the driver sat outside and passengers seated within an enclosed cabin, — deriving the configuration from the earlier brougham horse-drawn carriage. Similar in style to the later town car, the brougham style was used on chauffeur-driven petrol and electric cars.

In later years, several manufacturers (mostly in the United States) have used the term brougham as a prestigious model name or luxurious trim level on cars where the driver is in the cabin with the passengers (i.e. cars that do not use the brougham body style).

== Early broughams ==
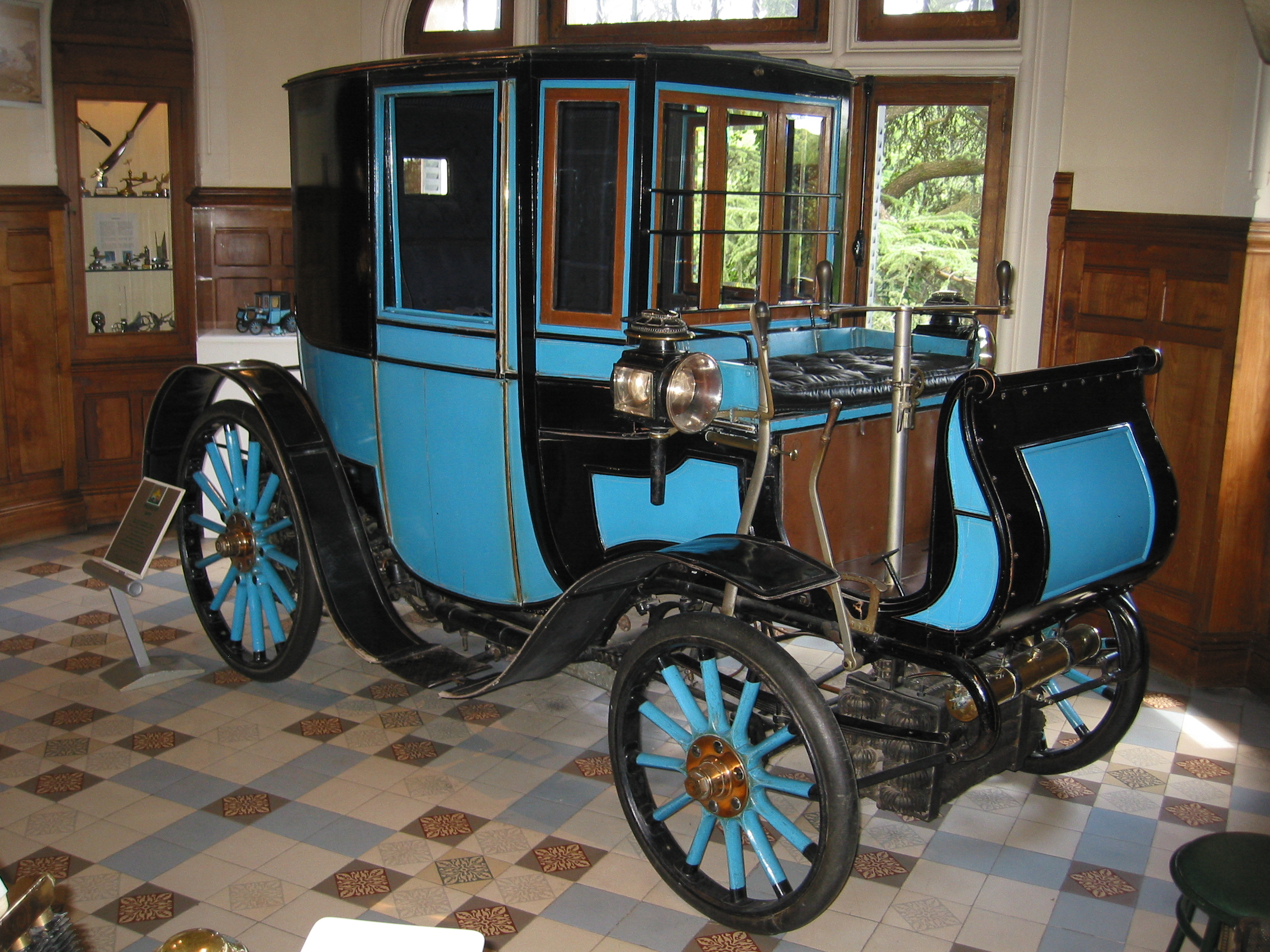
1899 Peugeot Type 27 brougham

As a car body style, a brougham was initially a vehicle similar to a limousine but with an outside seat in front for the chauffeur and an enclosed cabin behind for the passengers. As such, it was a version of the town car but, in its earliest incarnation, with the sharply squared rear end of the roof and the forward-curving body line at the base of the front of the passenger enclosure that was characteristic of the nineteenth-century brougham carriage on which the car style was based.

=== Electric cars ===
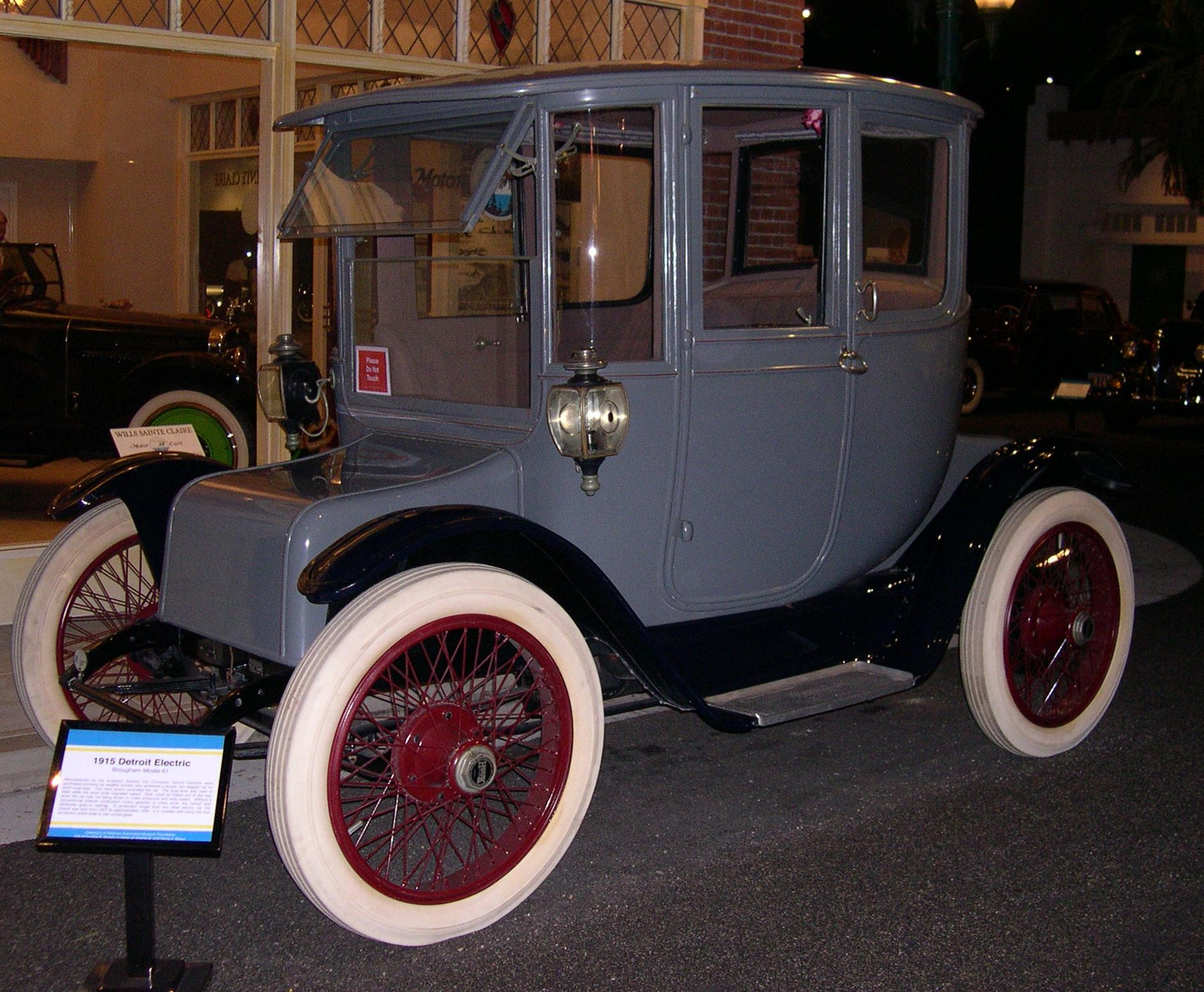
1915 Detroit Electric Brougham

In the late nineteenth century and early twentieth century, the brougham body style with an outside chauffeur was popular with electric cars. At that time, there were more than 200 manufacturers of these cars in the United States. In the United States during the first two decades of the twentieth century, the front of the body and the chauffeur were often deleted from the design, with controls placed inside for the owner to operate the vehicle. Despite the resulting coupé style, the result was still called a "brougham", causing the term to be applied to a two-door closed vehicle similar to a coupé, especially one electrically driven.

== "Brougham" as a model name or trim level ==
Cadillac was the first to use the name "Brougham" on a vehicle that did not use the Brougham body style for the 1916 Cadillac Brougham, a large 7-seat sedan. Since then, the term has shifted from its original meaning and been used as a model name by one manufacturer, a trim level by various (being applied to sedans and even convertibles).

Of particular note, "Brougham" was widely used from the 1970s to the 1990s by General Motors, Ford Motor Company, and the Chrysler Corporation, typically for the upper trim level of a particular model.

=== Examples of model name usage ===
- Cadillac
  - Cadillac Brougham
  - Cadillac Fleetwood Brougham
  - Cadillac Eldorado Brougham
  - Cadillac Sixty Special Brougham
- Oldsmobile
  - Oldsmobile Ninety-Eight Regency Brougham
  - Oldsmobile Delta 88 Royale Brougham
  - Oldsmobile Cutlass Supreme Brougham
  - Oldsmobile Toronado Brougham
- Pontiac
  - Pontiac Parisienne Brougham
  - Pontiac Bonneville Brougham
  - Pontiac Grand Prix Brougham
- Chevrolet
  - Chevrolet Caprice Classic Brougham
- Ford
  - Ford LTD Brougham
  - Ford Torino Brougham
- Mercury
  - Mercury Montego Brougham
  - Mercury Marquis Brougham
  - Mercury Park Lane Brougham
- Nissan
  - Nissan Cedric Brougham
  - Nissan Gloria Brougham
- Chrysler
  - Chrysler New Yorker Brougham
- Dodge
  - Dodge Monaco Brougham
- Plymouth
  - Plymouth Valiant Brougham
- American Motors
  - AMC Ambassador Brougham
- Holden
  - Holden Brougham
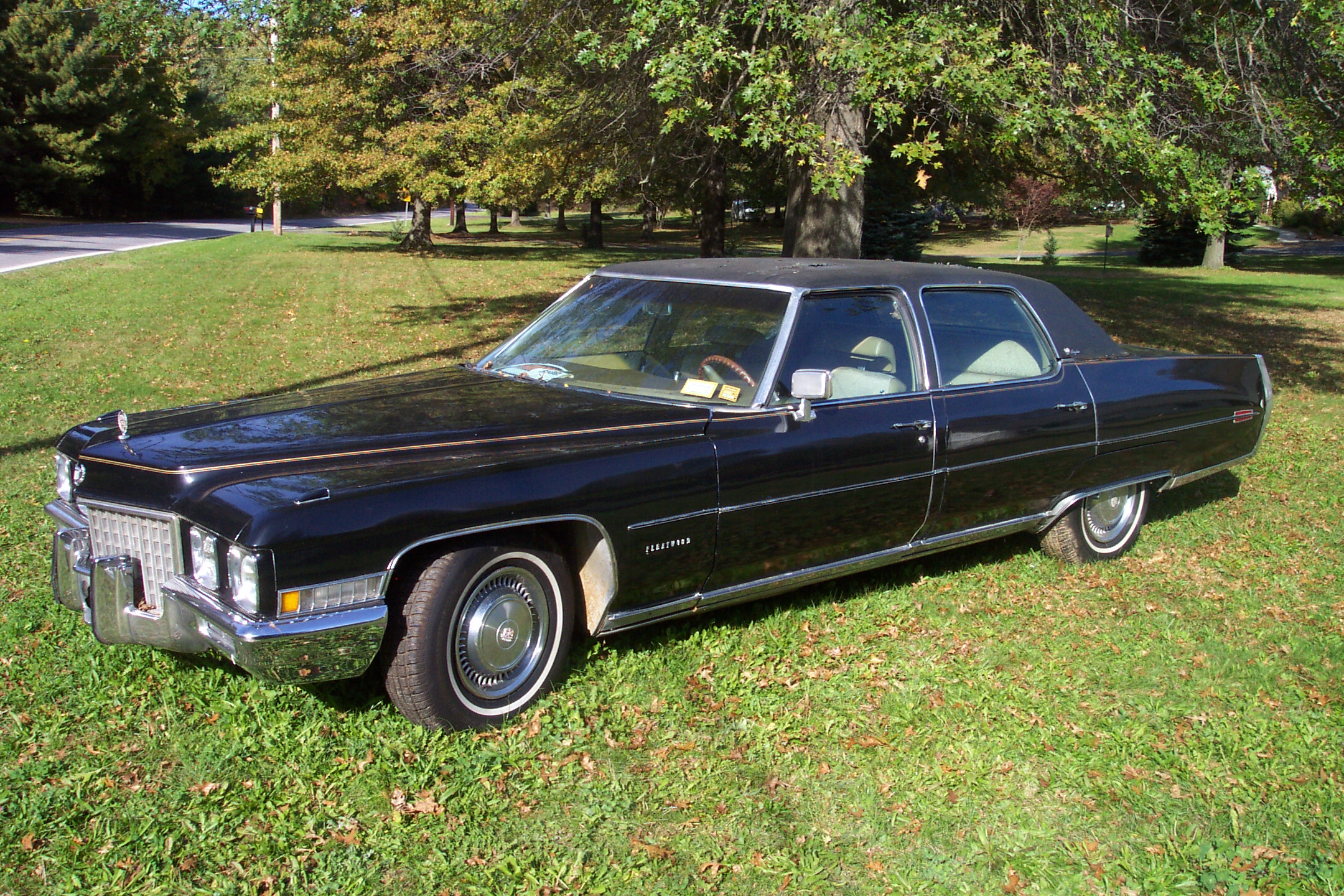
1971 Cadillac Fleetwood 60 Special Brougham

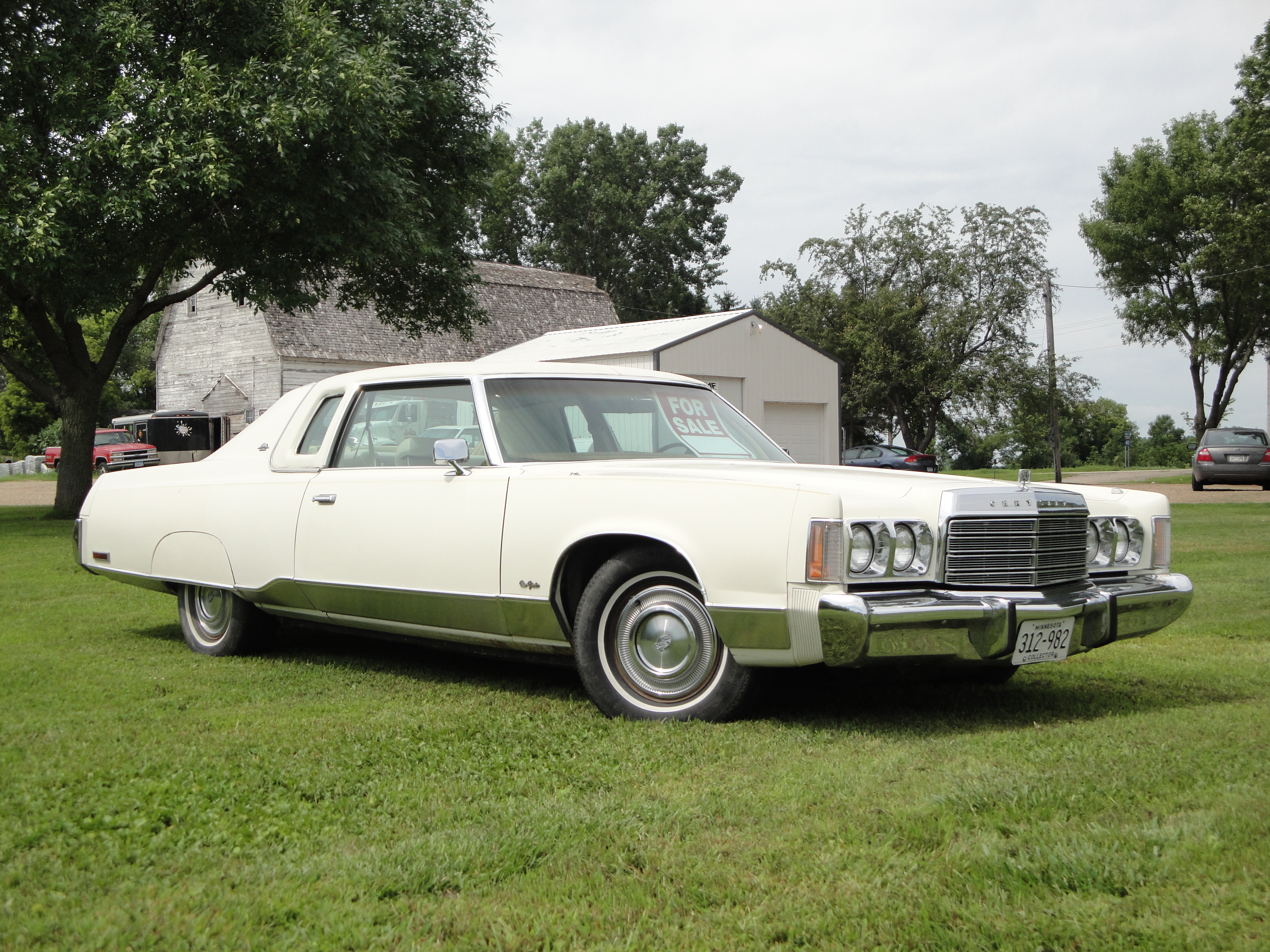
1974 Chrysler New Yorker Brougham

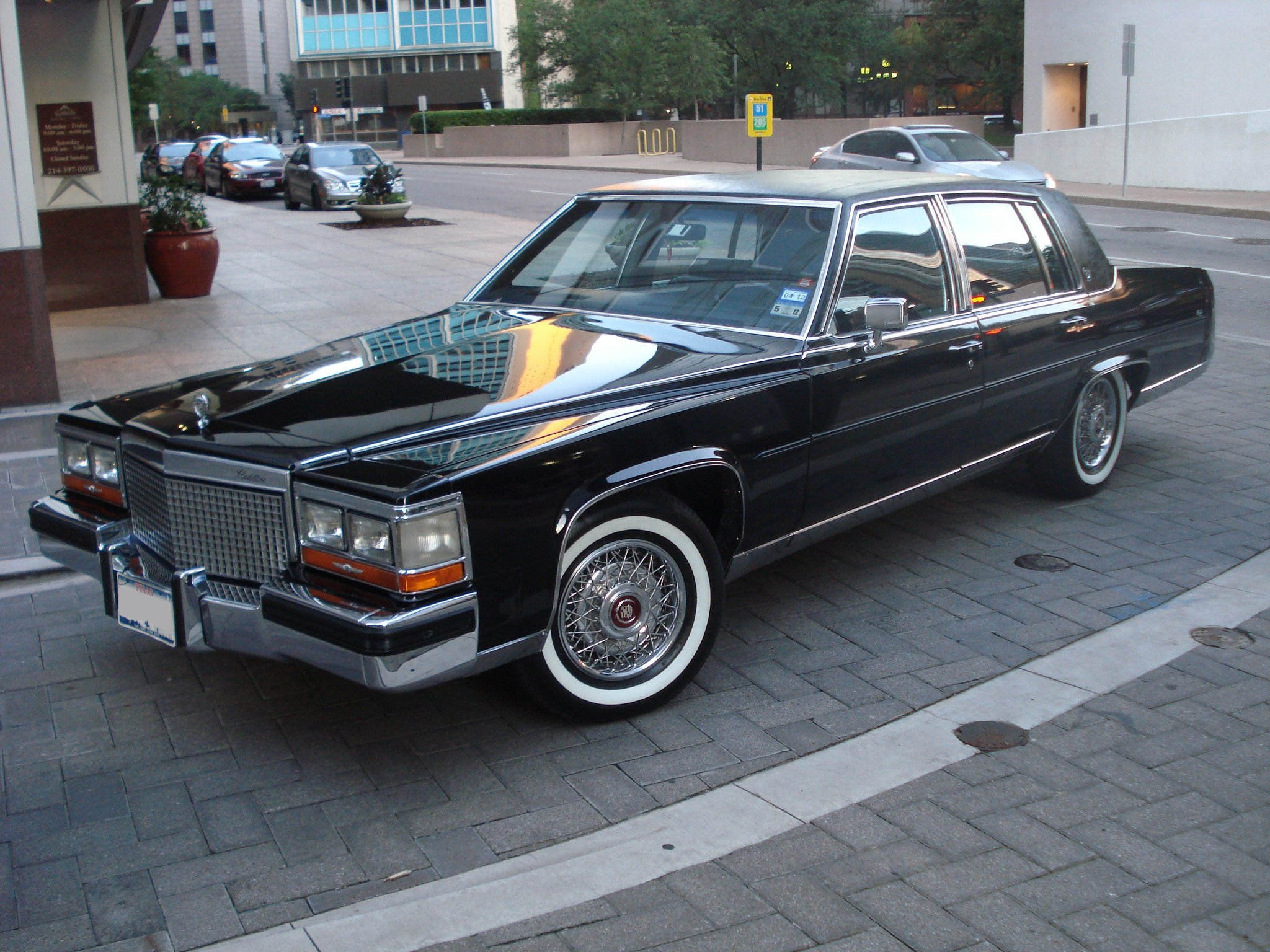
1988 Cadillac Brougham

== See also ==
- Landaulet – the opposite, with a covered driver's area and a convertible passenger compartment
