= General Motors D platform =

GM D-body
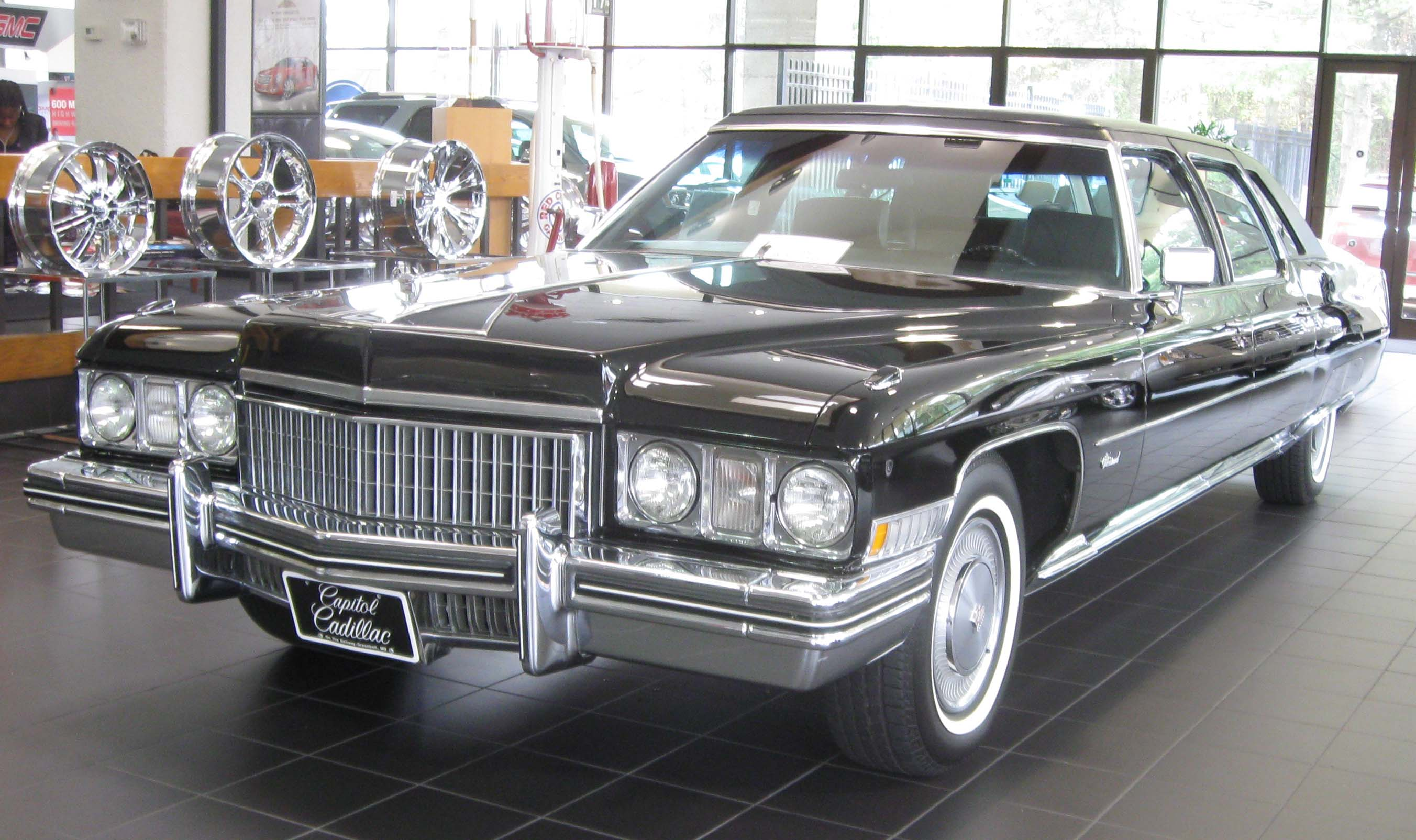
- 1973 Cadillac Fleetwood limousine

Overview
- Manufacturer: General Motors
- Model years: 1936–1996
- Assembly: Detroit Assembly, Detroit, Michigan, U.S. Arlington Assembly, Arlington, Texas, U.S.

Body and chassis
- Class: Full-size luxury car

The GM D platform (informally, D-body), was a General Motors automobile platform designation, used in two series (1936–1984 and 1985–1996) for large body-on-frame rear-wheel drive automobiles. For the majority of its existence the D-Body represented the largest Cadillac, either the Fleetwood Series 75 or the Fleetwood Limousine.

In 1985 GM downsized and redesignated its traditional large car rear wheel drive GM C platform as the new much smaller and lighter front wheel drive GM C platform. It also shifted its traditional, D platform Fleetwood limousine to the new C platform, ending production of the historic D platform. In turn, it redesignated the former RWD C platform the new D platform, and maintained production of a few RWD holdovers on it.

The original D platform was closely related to GM's other two rear-wheel drive large car platforms: the mainstream GM B and the upscale C platforms. But save for the limited production top-of-the-line 1936–1942 Buick Limited, the original GM D-platform was exclusive to Cadillac, GM's most luxurious brand. As GM's largest, the "new" D platform designated in 1985 was reserved to Cadillac through the end of its production in 1996.

== Model history ==
=== 1936–1984 original D-Body ===
During most of the 20th century the D-Body represented GM's largest and most exclusive car platform. The D-body was used for the Cadillac Series 85 from 1936 through 1937, for the Cadillac Series 90 from 1936 through 1940, for the Buick Limited from 1936 through 1942, for the Cadillac Series 72 in 1940, for the Cadillac Series 67 from 1941 through 1942, for the Cadillac Fleetwood Series 75 from 1936 through 1976, and for the Cadillac Fleetwood Limousine from 1977 through 1984.

=== 1985–1996 former RWD C-Body ===
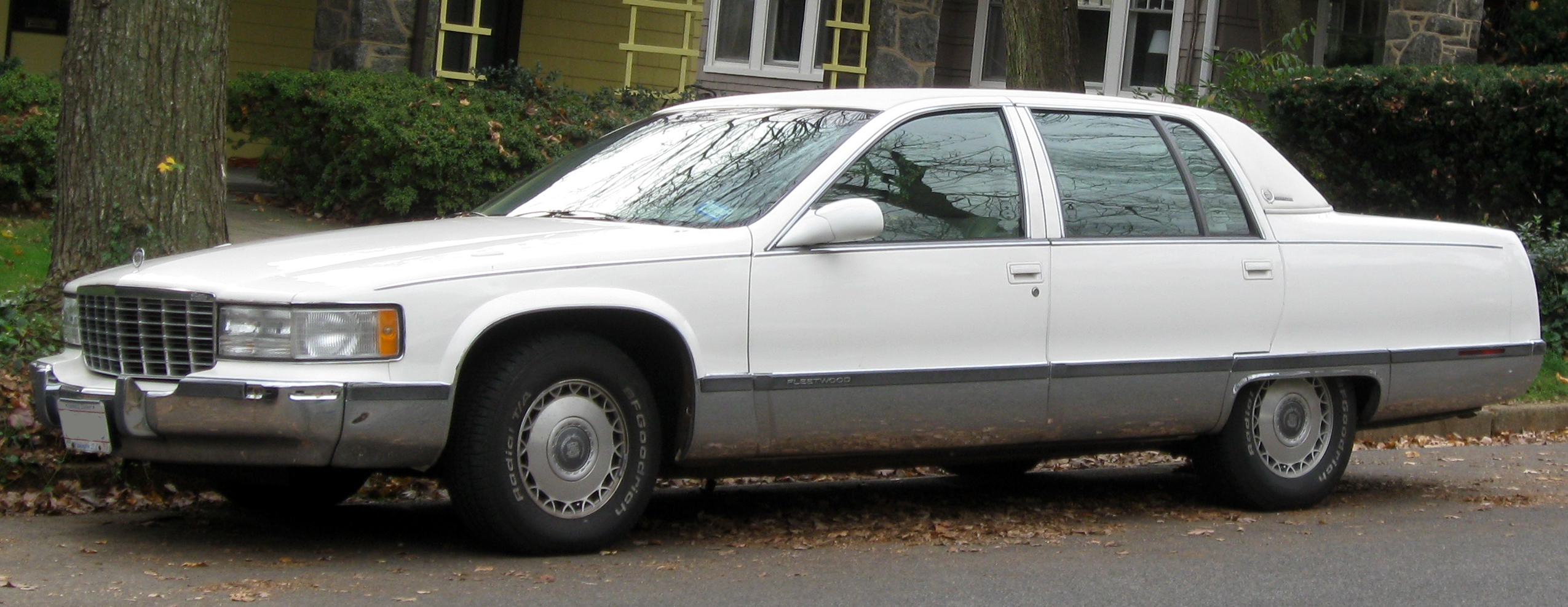
1995–1996 Cadillac Fleetwood

In 1985 GM reassigned the name of its traditional large car rear wheel drive GM C platform to its new much smaller and lighter front wheel drive GM C platform. Most of its large cars made the downsizing shift with it. However, the former C platform continued in limited use, being redesignated the "D platform" and employed by the 1985–1986 Cadillac Fleetwood Brougham, its direct successor 1987–1992 Cadillac Brougham, and 1993–1996 Cadillac Fleetwood, which reverted from being front-wheel drive 1985–1992 to rear-wheel drive

Compounding the confusion, the Cadillac Series 70 Fleetwood limousine, which had been built on the venerable original GM D platform (that traced its origins to 1936), was replaced in 1985 by the dramatically downsized C-platform Cadillac Series 75. This marked the end of the original D platform. Two years later the C platform Series 75 was discontinued, bringing to a close the Cadillac limousine era.

== Production ==
Early designation D-bodies (1936–1984), with the exception of the Buick Limited, which was produced in Flint, Michigan, were all produced at Detroit Assembly, Detroit, Michigan. Since all Fleetwood Broughams were being produced in Detroit prior to the name change, initially all late designation D-bodies (1985–1996) were built there as well. During the 1988 model year production of D-bodies was shifted to Arlington Assembly, Arlington, Texas where it remained until the last D-bodied car was built in 1996.

Production ended in 1996, leaving GM without a rear wheel drive luxury sedan. Later Cadillac introduced smaller cars on the Sigma platform. The spiritual successor of the D-Body Fleetwood is the Sedan de Ville d'Elegance which was later replaced by the Sedan de Ville High Luxury.

== Models ==
- 1936–1937 Cadillac Series 85
- 1936–1940 Cadillac Series 90
- 1936–1942 Buick Limited
- 1940 Cadillac Series 72
- 1941–1942 Cadillac Series 67
- 1936–1958 Cadillac Fleetwood Series 75
- 1959–1964 Cadillac Series 6900 Fleetwood 75
- 1965–1976 Cadillac Fleetwood 75 Sedan & Limousine
- 1977–1984 Cadillac Fleetwood Limousine & Formal Limousine
- 1985–1986 Cadillac Fleetwood Brougham
- 1987–1992 Cadillac Brougham
- 1993–1996 Cadillac Fleetwood
- 1936–1996 Cadillac Commercial Chassis

== See also ==
- List of General Motors platforms
