= Cadillac Brougham =

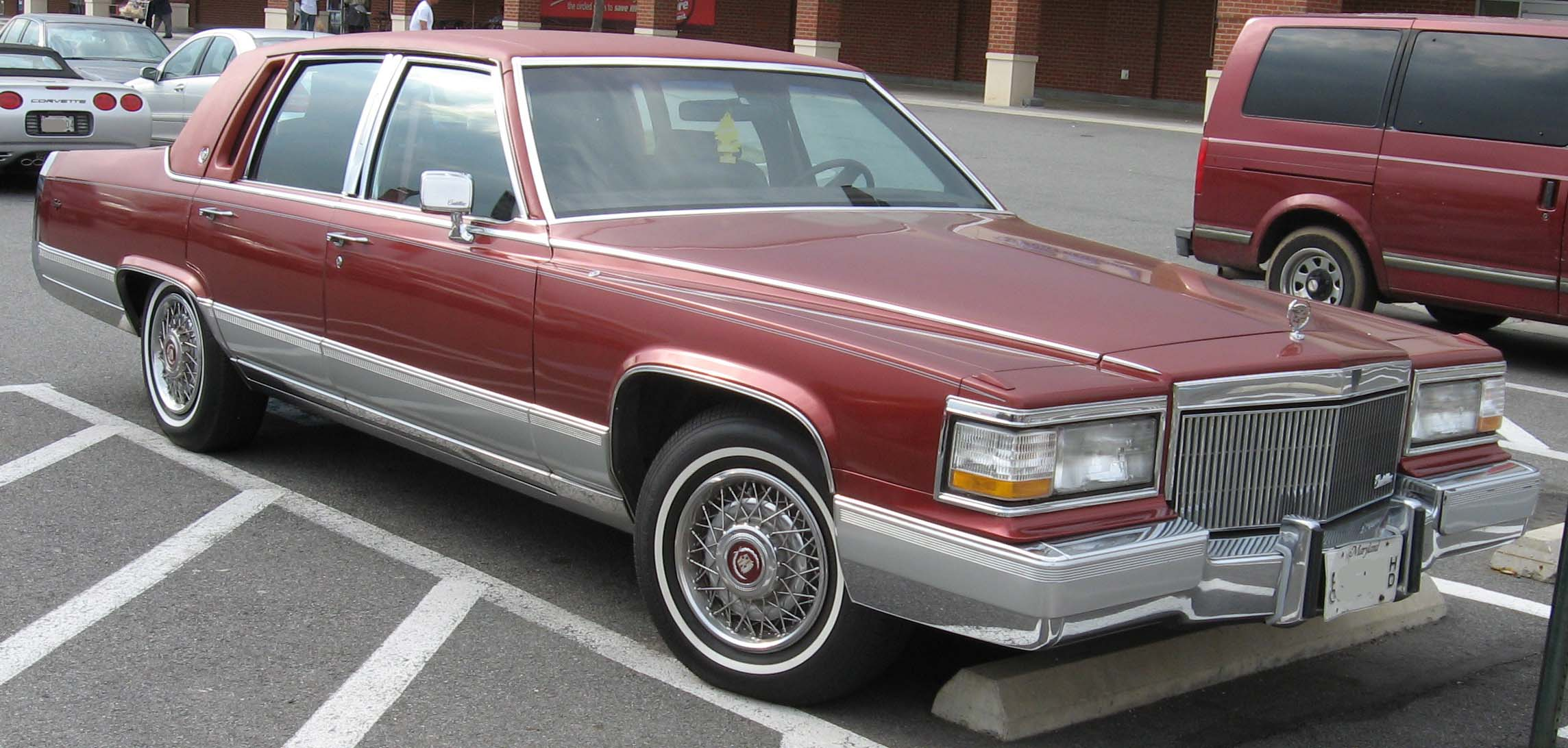
- 1990–1992 Cadillac Brougham

Overview
- Manufacturer: General Motors
- Production: 1986–1992
- Model years: 1987–1992
- Assembly: Detroit Assembly, Detroit, Michigan, U.S. (1987–1988); Arlington Assembly, Arlington, Texas, U.S. (1988–1992)

Body and chassis
- Class: Full-size luxury car
- Body style: 4-door notchback sedan
- Layout: FR layout
- Platform: D-body

Powertrain
- Engine: 5.0 L LV2 V8; 5.0 L Chevrolet V8; 5.7 L L05/LLO V8
- Transmission: 4-speed TH-200-4R automatic

Dimensions
- Wheelbase: 121.5 in (3,086 mm)
- Length: 221.0 in (5,613 mm)
- Width: 75.3 in (1,913 mm)
- Height: 1985–1989: 56.7 in (1,440 mm); 1990–1992: 57.4 in (1,458 mm)
- Curb weight: 4,300–4,500 lb (1,950–2,041 kg)

Chronology
- Predecessor: Cadillac Fleetwood Brougham
- Successor: Cadillac Fleetwood

The Cadillac Brougham is a line of full-size luxury cars manufactured by the Cadillac Motor Car Division of General Motors from the 1987 through 1992 model years and was marketed from 1977 to 1986 as the Cadillac Fleetwood Brougham. The optional "d'Elegance" trim package that was introduced during the Fleetwood era remained available. The model received a facelift in 1990 and was replaced by the 1993 rear wheel drive D-body Cadillac Fleetwood.

== History ==
Originally used for a single horse drawn enclosed carriage for two to four people, the "Brougham" owes its name to British statesman Henry Brougham. Cadillac first used the name in 1916 to designate an enclosed five-to-seven-passenger sedan body style. In the 1930s, the name was given to a formal body style with an open chauffeur compartment and enclosed rear quarters, metal roof and often "razor-edged" styling. When Cadillac started offering Fleetwood bodies on some of its cars in 1925, the Brougham body style was Fleetwood-bodied every year with the exception of 1926. After 1937, the Brougham name was not applied to any Cadillac for the remainder of the pre-World War II period.

The Brougham name would eventually reappear on the 1955 Cadillac Eldorado Brougham show car, which preceded the 4-door Eldorado Brougham hardtops of the 1957 to 1960 model years. The 1957 Cadillac Series 70 Eldorado Brougham joined the Sixty Special and the Series 75 as the only Cadillac models with Fleetwood bodies, although Fleetwood script or crests did not appear anywhere on the exterior of the car; this would also mark the first time in 20 years that a Fleetwood bodied car was paired with the Brougham name.

After a five-year absence, the Brougham name reappeared as an option package on the 1965 Cadillac Sixty Special. The following year, the Brougham moved up to becoming a subseries of the Fleetwood Sixty Special, which continued through 1970. Starting in 1971, the Sixty Special was only available as the well equipped Fleetwood Sixty Special Brougham. When the Sixty Special Series was retired in 1977, the Cadillac Fleetwood Brougham took its place as Cadillac's largest owner-driven sedan model, being sold through 1986.

The single name "Brougham" began to be used as specific Cadillac model in 1987, when the term "Fleetwood" was dropped from the former Fleetwood Brougham. It was otherwise the same as the 1986 model. The reason for the change was that Cadillac had introduced a new front-wheel drive model in 1985 and named it simply the Fleetwood. Compounding the confusion, the optional "d'Elegance" package (introduced in the upscale Fleetwood trim line in the 1970s, offering even more luxurious appointments, including button-tufted seating and rear-seat reading lamps), was available on and appended to the names of both models, resulting in a traditional body-on-frame/rear-wheel drive "Fleetwood Brougham d' Elegance" and a unibody/transverse engined "Fleetwood d' Elegance". The solution was dropping the term "Fleetwood" from the rear-wheel drive model, leaving just the "Brougham". Since it was body-on-frame, it was popular among coachbuilders who manufactured stretched limousines, along with the similar but somewhat smaller Lincoln Town Car, as well as traditional Cadillac buyers who preferred the familiar combination of exterior size, heft, and rear-wheel drive. This was the last Cadillac to be produced without airbags.

== Description ==
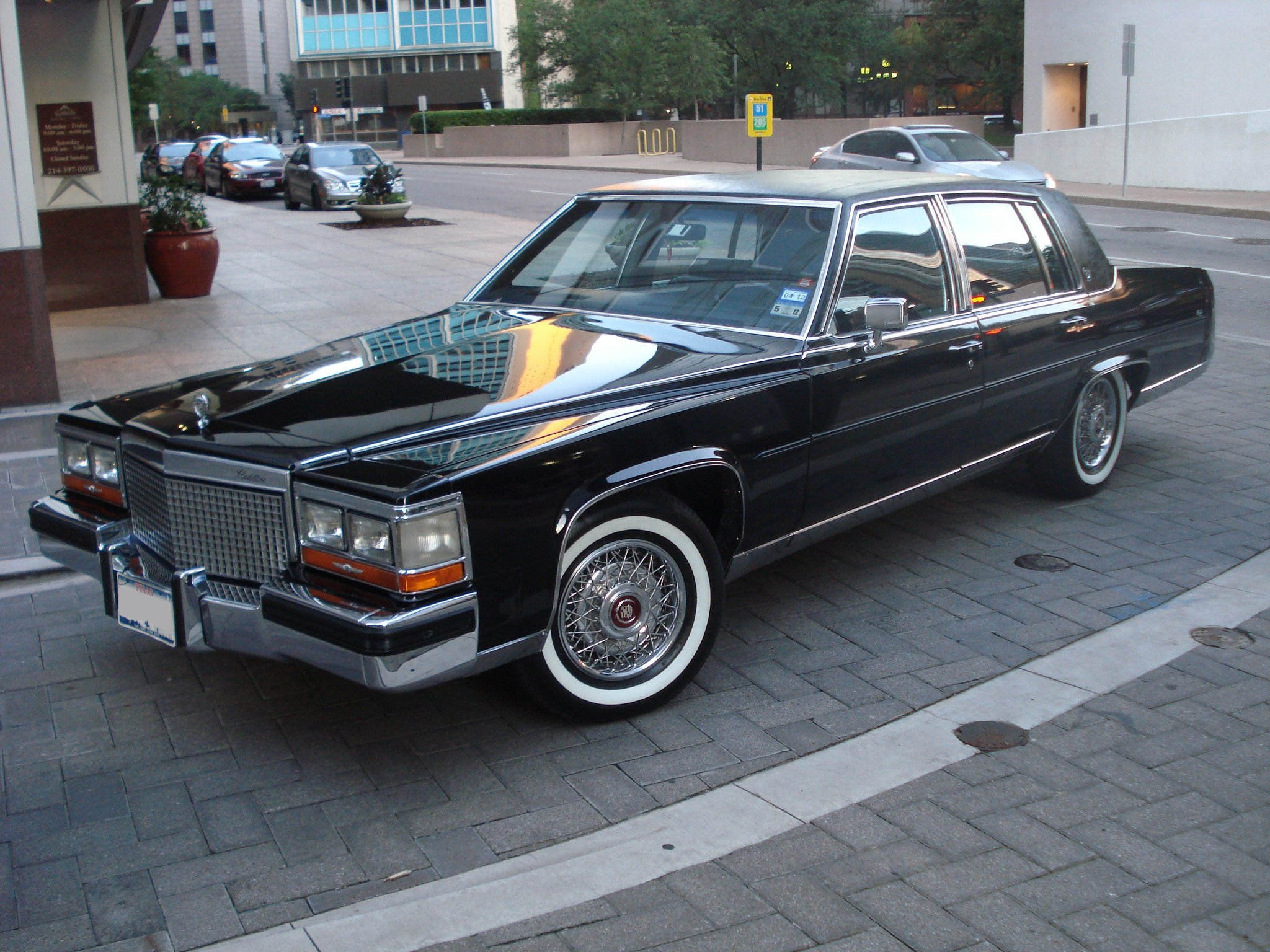
1988 Cadillac Brougham

The 1987 Brougham was built at the Clark Street Cadillac Assembly Plant in Detroit, Michigan, as the Fleetwood Brougham had been in 1985–86. Before the shift to Arlington Assembly in Arlington, Texas, some early 1988 models were produced at Detroit Assembly in late 1987 before the plant's closure in December 1987, and construction continued at Arlington through 1992. The 11th digit of the VIN indicates plant assembly. A "9" as the 11th digit indicates a Detroit Brougham, while an "R" indicates an Arlington Brougham. Many of the Arlington-assembled examples also had a state of Texas/GM Arlington decal on the rear side quarter glass.

VIN "9" Broughams were produced between 1986 and 1990 and, although rare, can be found as "commercial chassis" vehicles, and generally have a higher output Oldsmobile 307 LG8 Engine and different transmissions (typically the TH400 three speed), depending on the use. Generally speaking, minor differences between 1987 and 1988 (VIN 9 and Y) can be found, such as carburetor assembly. While these cars all used Rochester Quadrajet electronic four-barrel carburetors, differences include an electronic (Detroit) versus vacuum (Arlington) Idle Load Compensator, as well as an electronic (Detroit) versus climactic (Arlington) choke system. The vin "9" engine is the high output version of the base LV2 307 vin code Y and shares most parts with it. The HO engine is the same engine that was used in the rear-wheel drive Oldsmobile 442.

The Brougham wore a cross-hatch grille in 1987 and 1988, which was an identical re-cast of the 1981 Fleetwood Brougham/DeVille grille. The Brougham received a new vertical-slat grille for 1989, which was equal to the 1982–1986 grille with three horizontal sections. A 1990 facelift, the only one since the Fleetwood Brougham was restyled for 1980, was necessitated by a radically redesigned Town Car from rival Lincoln. For 1990, the Brougham received a new digital instrument cluster inside, and composite headlamps, contemporary taillamp lenses, flush bumper moldings, new lower body moldings and an optional Chevrolet 350 V8. Additionally, door-mounted front seatbelts became standard in order to meet federal safety standards, as the 1990-1992 Brougham was the only and last Cadillac model without a driver's side airbag.

For 1991, the LV2 V8 was replaced by a Chevrolet FI V8 that produced 170 hp (127 kW; 172 PS), while the Chevrolet 350 produced 185 hp (138 kW; 188 PS). The 1992 Brougham received no major changes, as it was the final year. The fuel injected engines proved to be reliable contenders and provided a marked power improvement over the Oldsmobile 307 carbureted engines.

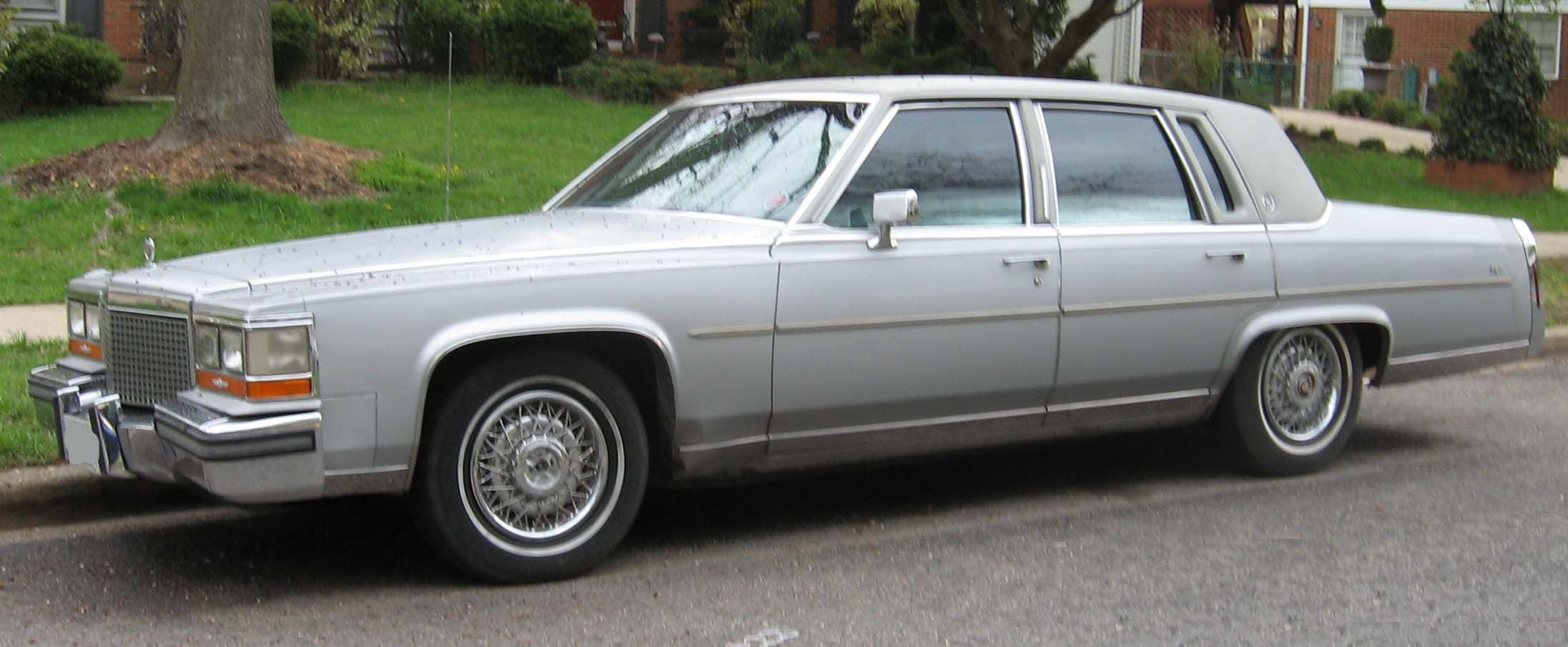
1988 Cadillac Brougham with Premier Roof option

For 1988 and 1989, the "Premier Formal Vinyl Roof" option became available, costing $1,095 and covering the roof as well as the B-pillar and the rear quarter window surround. For 1990, a variation of this roof treatment became standard in conjunction with the Brougham's facelift that year.

== Powertrains ==
Engines:

- 1987–1990: 5.0 litres (307 cu in) LV2 V8, 140 hp (104 kW; 142 PS)
- 1991–1992: 5.0 litres (305 cu in) Chevrolet FI V8, 170 hp (127 kW; 172 PS)
- 1990–1992: 5.7 litres (350 cu in) L05/LLO FI V8, 175 to 185 hp (130 to 138 kW; 177 to 188 PS)

Transmissions:

- 1987–1990: 4-speed Turbo-Hydramatic 200-4R automatic with the Oldsmobile V8
- 1990–1992: 4-speed 4L60 automatic with the Chevrolet V8

== Discontinuation ==
The Cadillac Brougham was discontinued in 1992. The Fleetwood name returned as a rear-wheel drive model with a major redesign for 1993 (the FWD Fleetwood had been renamed Sixty Special that year), and Brougham again became an option package, as it had been in 1965.

== Production ==
Production Figures
Year	Production
1987	65,504
1988	53,130
1989	40,264
1990	33,741
1991	27,231
1992	13,761
TOTAL	233,631
