= GM LT1 engine =

General Motors has produced three different engines called LT1:

- 1970–1972 LT-1 – Chevrolet Generation I Small-Block
- 1992–1997 LT1 – GM Generation II Small-Block
- 2013–(current) LT1 - GM Generation V Small-Block.
