= Cadillac Fleetwood Brougham =

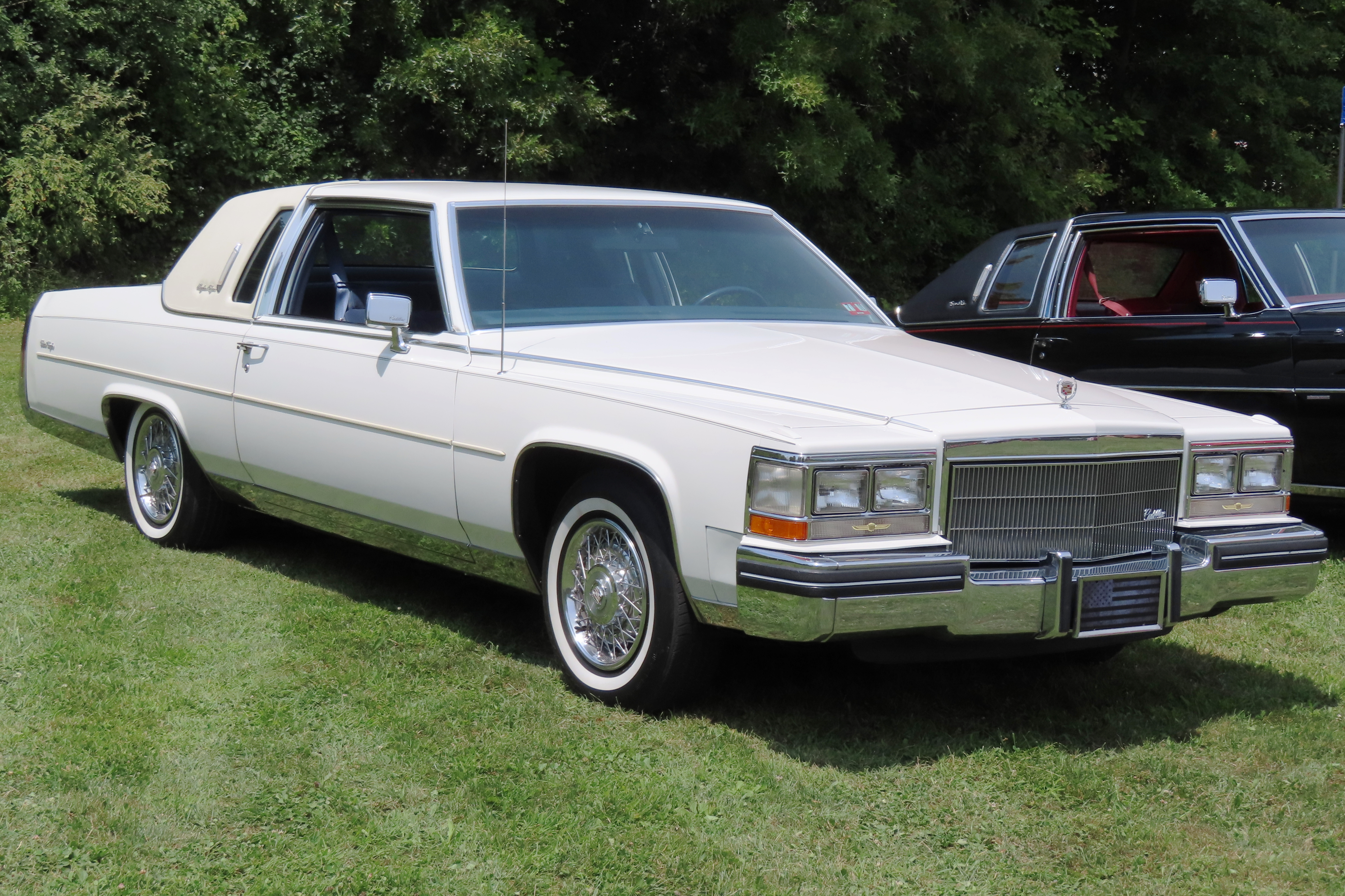
- 1984 Cadillac Fleetwood Brougham d'Elegance coupe

Overview
- Manufacturer: Cadillac (General Motors)
- Model years: 1977–1986
- Assembly: Detroit Assembly, Detroit, Michigan, U.S.
- Designer: Bill Mitchell

Body and chassis
- Class: Full-size luxury car
- Body style: 4-door sedan 2-door coupe
- Layout: FR layout
- Platform: C-body; D-body
- Related: Cadillac De Ville; Buick Electra; Oldsmobile 98

Powertrain
- Engine: 250 cu in (4.1 L) HT-4100 V8; 252 cu in (4.1 L) Buick V6; 307 cu in (5.0 L) Oldsmobile V8; 350 cu in (5.7 L) LF9 Diesel V8; 368 cu in (6.0 L) L62 V8; 425 cu in (7.0 L) L33/L35 V8
- Transmission: 3-speed TH-400 automatic 3-speed TH-350C automatic 4-speed TH-200-4R automatic

Dimensions
- Wheelbase: 1977–79: 121.5 in (3,086 mm); 1980–82: 121.4 in (3,084 mm); 1983–86: 121.5 in (3,086 mm)
- Length: 1977–79: 221.2 in (5,618 mm); 1980–86: 221.0 in (5,613 mm)
- Width: 4-door: 75.3 in (1,913 mm); 2-door: 75.4 in (1,915 mm)
- Height: 1977: 57.2 in (1,453 mm); 1978–86 4-door: 56.7 in (1,440 mm); 2-door: 54.6 in (1,387 mm)
- Curb weight: 4,000–4,500 lb (1,800–2,000 kg)

Chronology
- Predecessor: Cadillac Sixty Special
- Successor: Cadillac Brougham

The Cadillac Fleetwood Brougham is a luxury car manufactured by Cadillac from 1977 through 1986. In 1987, the Fleetwood Brougham name was shortened to simply Brougham, with production continuing through 1992 with only minor updates.

Cadillac used the "Fleetwood" name as a prefix between 1934 and 1976 on several of its most expensive models, always designating an elevated level of luxury. From 1957 until 1961, Cadillac used the "Brougham" sub-designation for its exclusive four-door Eldorado models.

In 1965, the "Brougham" name was first affixed to "Fleetwood" on the Fleetwood Sixty Special as an upgraded option package, which included a vinyl roof and special "Brougham" script lettering on the sides, but it was not a separate model. In 1966, the Fleetwood Brougham was added as a separate model, accompanying the Fleetwood 60 Special, which continued through 1970. In 1971, with the Fleetwood Brougham outselling the Fleetwood 60 Special by a large margin, the two models were consolidated into a single model, the Fleetwood 60 Special Brougham, and would continue with this name through 1976. The car's name was shortened to Fleetwood Brougham with the 1977 downsizing across the GM car line. The "d'Elegance" and "Talisman" sub-models were also sometimes used to designate upgraded option packages.

== Evolution of the Fleetwood designation ==
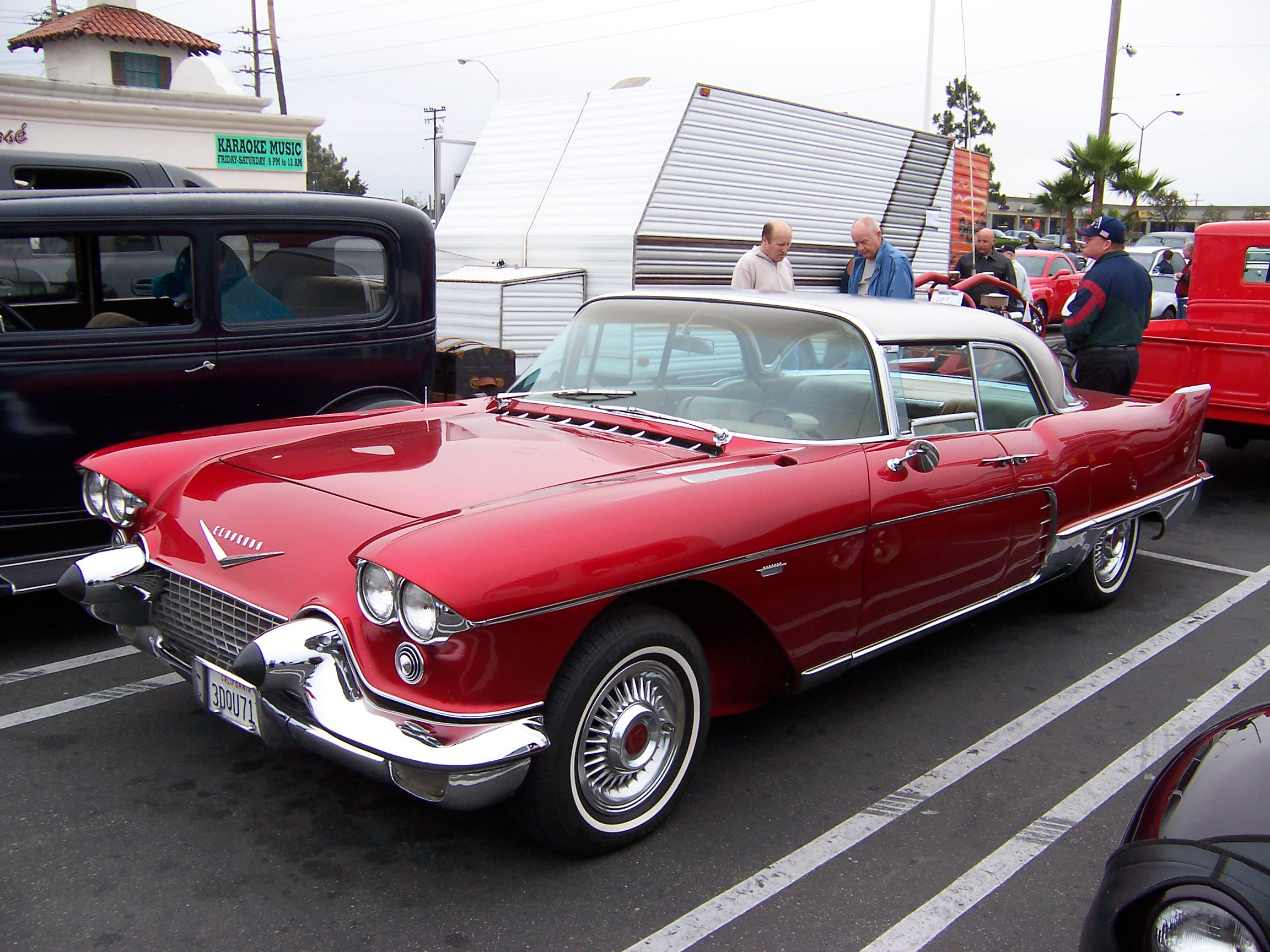
1957 Cadillac Fleetwood Series 70 Eldorado Brougham

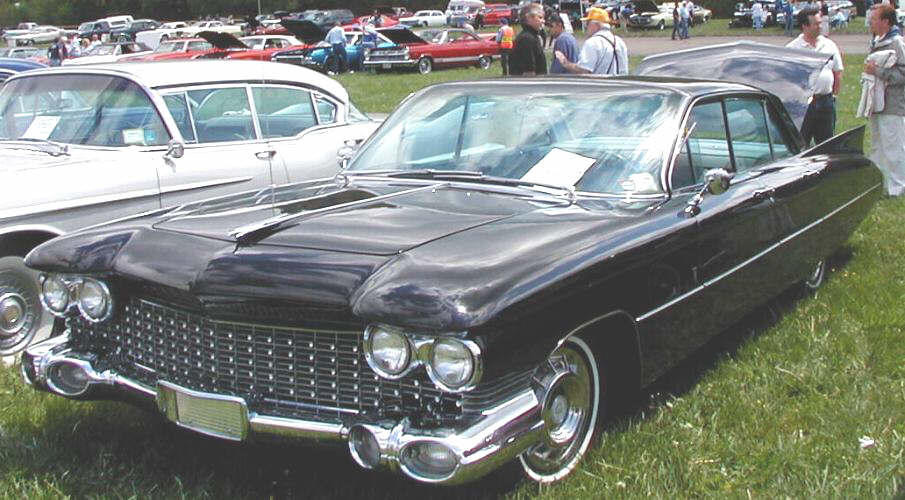
1959 Cadillac Fleetwood Eldorado Brougham

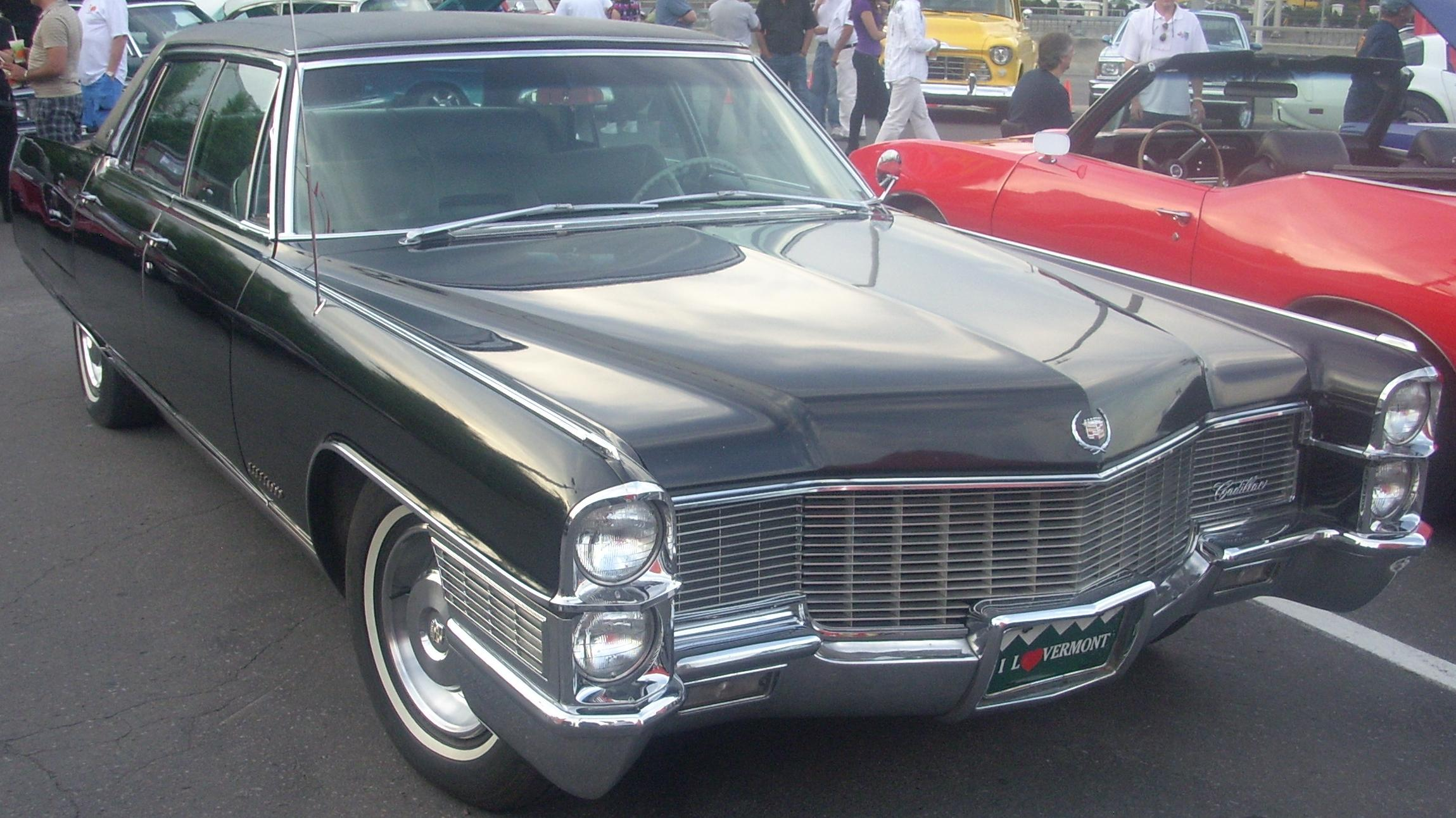
1965 Cadillac Fleetwood 60 Special with Brougham option package

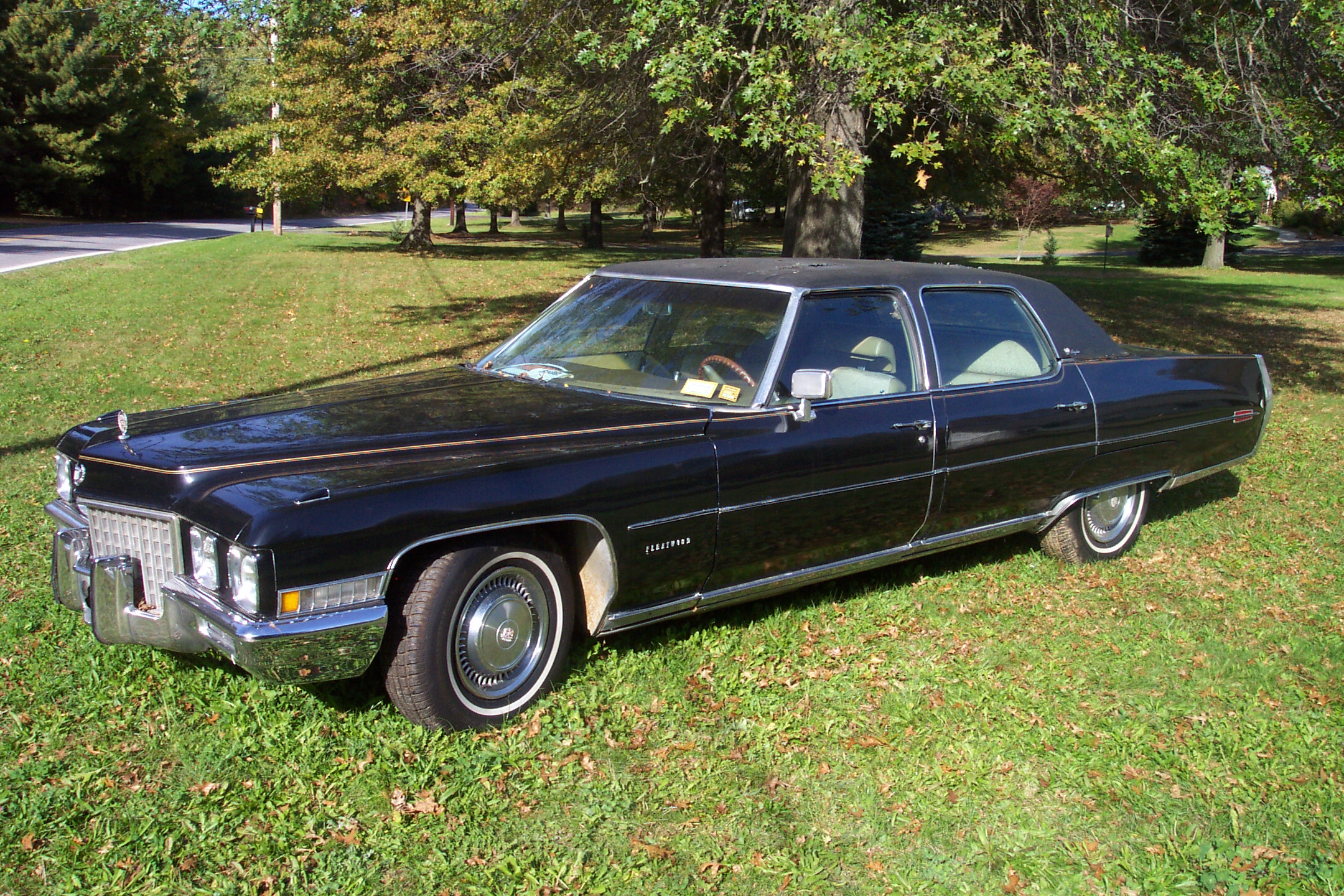
1971 Cadillac Fleetwood 60 Special Brougham

Lawrence P. Fisher was the Fisher brother most closely involved with Cadillac in its early years. In 1916, he joined the Fisher Body Company, which had been formed by two of his brothers in 1908. Larry (as people knew him) was one of four of the seven Fisher brothers who brought Fisher Body Corporation under the General Motors umbrella in 1919. In May 1925, Alfred P. Sloan, then the head of General Motors, appointed Fisher as Cadillac General Manager, an office he retained through 1934. Fisher immediately went to work adding exclusive, custom bodies to the Cadillac range. Thus he oversaw the purchase of the Fleetwood Metal Body Company by the Fisher Body Corporation in September 1925.

The Fleetwood Body Company of Fleetwood, Pennsylvania, was founded by Harry Urich in the nineteenth century. It began as a small community of craftsmen founded by Henry Fleetwood, Esq. of Penwortham, near Lancaster, England (the Fleetwood family flourished in England in the 17th and 18th centuries). The rich traditions of 300 years of coach-building that the Fleetwood Body Company applied to its work on cars secured for it a high reputation in automobile circles worldwide by the 1920s. Coachwork was built by Fleetwood for a variety of luxury makes through 1924. However, after the Fisher Body Corporation purchased the Fleetwood Body Company in 1925, Fleetwood bodies were reserved exclusively for Cadillac. By 1929 GM had purchased the remaining stock holdings of the Fisher Body Corporation and thus became sole owner of both the Fisher and Fleetwood companies.

Originally an enclosed carriage, drawn by a single horse, for 2–4 persons, “Brougham” owes its name to British statesman, Henry Brougham. Cadillac first used the name in 1916 to designate an enclosed 5-7 passenger sedan body style. In the thirties, the name was given to a formal body style with open chauffeur compartment and enclosed rear quarters, metal roof and often "razor-edged" styling. When Cadillac started offering Fleetwood bodies on some of its cars in 1925, the Brougham body style was Fleetwood bodied every year with the exception of 1926. After 1937 the Brougham name was not applied to any Cadillac for the remainder of the pre-WW II period.

The Brougham name would eventually reappear on the 1955 Cadillac Eldorado Brougham show car which preceded the 4-door Eldorado Brougham hardtops of the 1957 to 1960 model years. In 1957 the Cadillac Series 70 Eldorado Brougham joined the Sixty Special and the Series 75 as the only Cadillac models with Fleetwood bodies although Fleetwood script or crests did not appear anywhere on the exterior of the car, and so this would also mark the first time in 20 years that a Fleetwood bodied car was paired with the Brougham name. When production of the Eldorado Brougham was shifted in 1959 from the Cadillac Fleetwood plant in Detroit to Pininfarina in Turin, Italy, only then did it acquire Fleetwood wheel discs and doorsill moldings, presumably because the design work and final touches were still being done by Fleetwood. The 1960 Eldorado Brougham would be the final iteration.

After a five year absence the Brougham name once again reappeared as an option package on the 1965 Cadillac Sixty Special. The following year the Brougham moved up to becoming a subseries of the Fleetwood Sixty Special. This continued through 1970. Starting in 1971 the Sixty Special was only available as the well equipped Fleetwood Sixty Special Brougham.

When the Sixty Special Series was retired in 1977, the Fleetwood Brougham took its place as Cadillac's largest owner-driven sedan model through 1986.

== Fleetwood Brougham ==
For 1977, GM significantly downsized their full sized cars. The DeVille and Fleetwood Brougham rode on the same 121.5" wheelbase and were powered by the 425 cubic inch (7.0 L) V8. This engine was basically a de-bored version of the 472/500 (7.7 L/8.2 L) V8 of previous years. Compared with the 1976 Fleetwood Sixty Special Brougham, the Fleetwood Brougham had a wheelbase 11.5" shorter and weighed nearly 900 lb (400 kg) less. The new Fleetwood Brougham, which had lost its exclusive longer wheelbase, was now virtually identical to the lesser Sedan de Ville. Other than the name, there were only subtle exterior differences between a Fleetwood Brougham and Sedan de Ville, including a slightly reshaped B-pillar and rear side windows. The 1980 refresh eliminated this distinction. The interior of the Fleetwood was more plush and offered more features as standard.

Size comparison between 1974 Cadillac Fleetwood Sixty Special Brougham and 1977 Cadillac Fleetwood Brougham

| | 1974 Cadillac Fleetwood 60 Special Brougham | 1977 Cadillac Fleetwood Brougham |
|---|---|---|
| Wheelbase | 133.0 in (3,378 mm) | 121.5 in (3,086 mm) |
| Overall Length | 233.7 in (5,936 mm) | 221.2 in (5,618 mm) |
| Width | 79.8 in (2,027 mm) | 75.3 in (1,913 mm) |
| Height | 55.3 in (1,405 mm) | 57.2 in (1,453 mm) |
| Front Headroom | 39.3 in (998 mm) | 39.0 in (991 mm) |
| Front Legroom | 41.9 in (1,064 mm) | 42.0 in (1,067 mm) |
| Front Hip Room | 57.8 in (1,468 mm) | 55.0 in (1,397 mm) |
| Front Shoulder Room | 62.1 in (1,577 mm) | 59.4 in (1,509 mm) |
| Rear Headroom | 38.3 in (973 mm) | 38.1 in (968 mm) |
| Rear Legroom–ins. | 44.6 in (1,133 mm) | 41.2 in (1,046 mm) |
| Rear Hip Room | 58.0 in (1,473 mm) | 55.7 in (1,415 mm) |
| Rear Shoulder Room | 64.0 in (1,626 mm) | 59.4 in (1,509 mm) |
| Luggage Capacity | 15.9 cu ft (450 L) | 19.5 cu ft (552 L) |

In 1980, GM gave all of the full-sized B and C-body line new sheet metal to tidy up the styling and improve aerodynamics. The basic dashboard design, introduced for 1977, was retained. also new for 1980 was a two-door Fleetwood Brougham Coupe, which featured an exclusive formal landau vinyl roof. The 425 cu in (7.0 L) engine, a reduced bore 472, was further debored for 1980-81 to 368 cubic inches or 6.0 liters in order to comply with newly-enacted CAFE standards. For 1981, the 368 was provided with a modulated displacement system designed by Eaton Corporation, controlled by a digital computer, which locked off intake and exhaust valves to two or four of the eight cylinders, thus running effectively as a V6 or V4 under light load conditions when in third gear, and over 35 mph (56 km/h). This engine, called the "V8-6-4", was reliable, but the computer technology of the era was not refined enough for smooth operation and it was dropped from all models but limousines after 1981.

Both the 425 and 368 are small-bore versions of the durable 472 (which was introduced in late 1967 for the '68 model year). The larger 500 had the 472's bore but a longer stroke. This engine family was the last Cadillac cast-iron engine, and the last 'big-block'. During this period, an assortment of engines were offered in the interest of fuel economy. These included the Buick 252 V6, diesel Oldsmobile 350 V8, and of Cadillac's own "HT-4100" small block V8, an alloy unit with cast iron cylinder liners which was troublesome and prone to early failure. The first two were dropped in 1982 once gas prices began falling while the latter persisted through 1986.

For 1985, Cadillac introduced a brand-new front-wheel drive platform for DeVille and Fleetwood. This car featured two "firsts"; it had the first transverse mounted V8 ever (the HT4100) and it was the first car to have a high mounted rear stop-lamp that was federally mandated starting in the 1986 model year. The rear wheel drive 1985 Cadillac Fleetwood Brougham continued on nearly unchanged from the 1984 model. 1985 was the final model year for the Fleetwood Brougham coupe. In 1986, the HT-4100 V8 was replaced with an Oldsmobile-sourced 307 cubic inch (5.0 L) V8 in the Fleetwood Brougham.

Production Figures:

Cadillac Fleetwood Brougham Production Figures
| | Coupe | Sedan | Yearly Total |
|---|---|---|---|
| 1985 | 8,336 | 52,960 | 61,296 |
| 1986 | - | 49,115 | 49,115 |
| Total | 8,336 | 102,075 | 110,411 |

== Brougham (1987–1992) ==
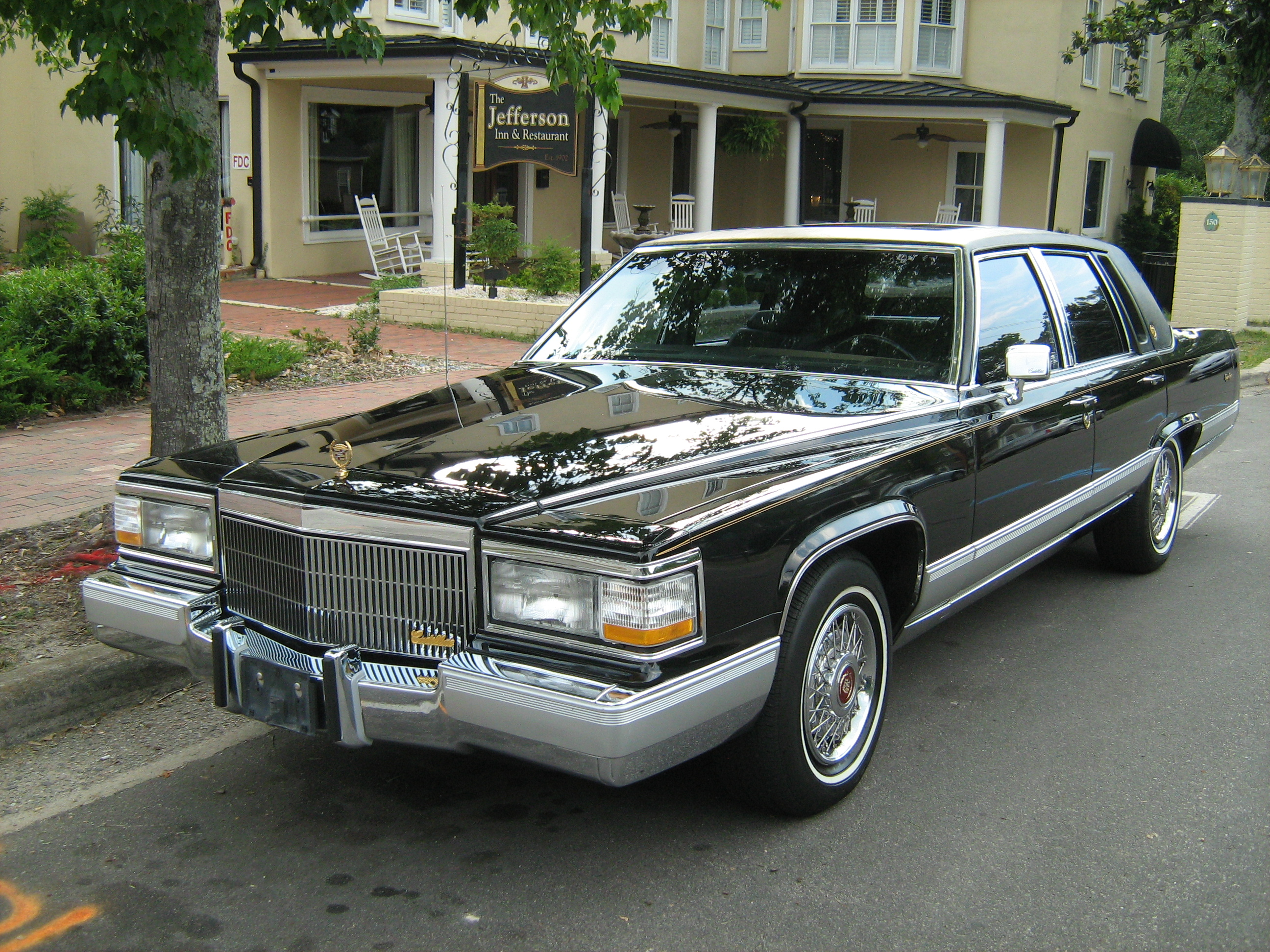
1991 Cadillac Brougham d'Elegance

For 1987, Cadillac revised its model nomenclature for its premium sedan lines. To minimize market confusion between the C-body Fleetwood (introduced for 1985) and the D-body Fleetwood Brougham, the latter sedan was renamed the Cadillac Brougham. Produced with only incremental revisions since 1980, the Cadillac Brougham bore a strong resemblance to the 1977 Cadillac Fleetwood. The last Cadillac sold with a carbureted engine (ending in 1990), the Brougham is the final Cadillac sold without any airbags.

For 1993, GM redesigned the Cadillac D-body line, becoming a longer-wheelbase version of the B-body Chevrolet Caprice and Buick Roadmaster. The standalone Brougham name was dropped, reverting to the Fleetwood nameplate, with the Brougham name serving as a premium trim package for the model line.

After 1996, the Fleetwood was discontinued; along with ending production of rear-wheel drive sedans, the change reduced model overlap within Cadillac as the division concentrated on the DeVille series; the 1996 Fleetwood Brougham is the final American car sold with the Brougham name.

== Engines ==
| Years | Displacement | Power | Torque |
|---|---|---|---|
| 1981–1982 | 252 cu in (4.1 L) Buick V6 | 125 hp (93 kW) | 205 lb⋅ft (278 N⋅m) |
| 1982–1985 | 250 cu in (4.1 L) HT-4100 V8 | 135 hp (101 kW) | 190 lb⋅ft (258 N⋅m) |
| 1986 | 307 cu in (5.0 L) Oldsmobile 307 V8 | 140 hp (104 kW) | 245 lb⋅ft (332 N⋅m) |
| 1979–1985 | 350 cu in (5.7 L) LF9 Diesel V8 | 105 hp (78 kW) | 205 lb⋅ft (278 N⋅m) |
| 1980–1981 | 368 cu in (6.0 L) L62 V8-6-4 V8 | 145 hp (108 kW) | 270 lb⋅ft (366 N⋅m) |
| 1977–1979 | 425 cu in (7.0 L) L33 V8 | 180 hp (134 kW) | 320 lb⋅ft (434 N⋅m) |
| 1977–1979 | 425 cu in (7.0 L) L35 V8 | 195 hp (145 kW) | 320 lb⋅ft (434 N⋅m) |
