= Cadillac Commercial Chassis =

Motor vehicle chassis

- Miller-Meteor combination car body on 1967 Cadillac Commercial Chassis

Overview
- Type: Incomplete vehicle (rolling chassis)
- Manufacturer: Cadillac
- Model code: Z 6890; Z69890; Z90
- Production: 1931-1984

Body and chassis
- Body style: Ambulance; Professional car (hearse); Limousine
- Platform: GM D platform
- Chassis: Body-on-frame
- Related: Cadillac Series 355; Cadillac Series 75

The Cadillac Commercial Chassis is a chassis that was built by the Cadillac division of General Motors. Produced from 1931 to 1984, the Commercial Chassis was constructed as an incomplete vehicle intended for use by coachbuilders for final assembly and fitment of bodywork. Initially a variant of the Series 355, the design shifted to the Series 75 from 1936 onward.

Produced on the D platform (exclusive to Cadillac) throughout its entire production, the Commercial Chassis was initially derived from the Series 355, shifting to the Series 75 from 1936 onward. Since 1960 they had a longer wheelbase by 6.3 in (16 cm).

Coinciding with a change in design regulations and the downsizing of Cadillac sedans, the Commercial Chassis was phased out as a distinct product line after 1984. Subsequently, the model became a variant of full-size Cadillac sedans; current production use Cadillac SUVs as a basis.

== Design overview ==
The Cadillac Commercial Chassis is a variant of the GM D-body specifically developed for professional car use; most applications included funeral coaches (hearses), ambulances, and combination cars. In contrast to the Cadillac 75 (a factory-built limousine), the Commercial Chassis was designed with a heavier-duty frame; to improve access to the rear cargo area, the rear frame rails were positioned lower than a standard D-body.

Produced by Cadillac as an "incomplete vehicle", the rolling chassis was fitted with no bodywork aft of the dashboard. While fitted with all road controls and front body trim (and air conditioning, if specified), all bodywork from the dashboard rearward was completed by coachbuilders using the chassis as a basis for a completed vehicle; to aid body fabrication, front door shells and rear quarter panels were shipped to the coachbuilders (separate from the chassis).

Before World War II, the Commercial Chassis used the longest wheelbase of any GM sedan-based vehicle, ranging up to 165 inches in 1940. During the 1950s and 1960s, the chassis used a 156-inch wheelbase, with the 1971-1976 chassis reaching a 157.5-inch length. The powertrain was shared with the Series 75 through its entire production.

== Discontinuation ==
1975 Miller-Meteor Lifeliner ambulance (Cadillac chassis)

1980 Cadillac with Superior Sovereign hearse body

In the early 1970s, federal regulations related to ambulance design forced manufacturers to shift their donor chassis from commercial car chassis to cutaway van chassis (and light-duty trucks). Shifting body design away from the traditional wagon-type body to a modular box, the new requirements increased interior working space and access, while van-based chassis offered greater payload and the additional stability afforded by a dual rear-wheel axle.

For 1977, Cadillac redesigned and downsized its full-size sedan lines; the D-body chassis dropped the Series 75 (replaced by the Cadillac Fleetwood Limousine). The Commercial Chassis adopted the design of the downsized Fleetwood Brougham, with a proportionally similar reduction in wheelbase; the previous 8.2 L V8 was also downsized, becoming a 7.0 L engine (replaced by a 6.0 L V8 for 1980). The final ambulances built using the Commercial Chassis were built in 1979.

The downsizing of the D-body chassis held a negative effect on professional car manufacturing. Though far larger than the fully-bodied Fleetwood Brougham and again using a heavier-duty frame, the change in chassis forced body manufacturers to update their product designs to accommodate the new design, leading to a rise in their price. By the end of the 1970s, Cadillac-based professional cars underwent a large drop in sales, with multiple funeral coach builders either closing their doors or becoming sold and reorganized (such as Superior, Miller-Meteor and Hess & Eisenhardt).

For 1985, the D-body Commercial Chassis was retired, as the model designation was adopted for incomplete vehicle versions of Cadillac sedan lines. In addition to professional cars, the new Commercial Chassis formed the basis of limousines (stretched by body manufacturers) A variant of both the front-wheel drive Fleetwood and rear-wheel drive Fleetwood Brougham (adopting the D-body designation), the new designation dropped the heavier-duty frame and chassis components.

Following the 1996 discontinuation of the Fleetwood Brougham, Cadillac has continued to manufacture incomplete versions of its unibody-chassis product lines. Alongside the Sedan DeVille, Cadillac has made incomplete variants of the DTS, XTS, and CT6; several of its SUVs also have come into use by the professional car industry, including the Cadillac Escalade ESV (based on the Chevrolet Suburban), SRX, XT5, and XT6 have also served as a basis as Cadillac has transitioned away from full-size sedans entirely.

== Legacy ==
Ecto-1, a 1959 Cadillac with an ambulance body

The Cadillac Commercial Chassis is perhaps most famous as the basis for the Ecto-1 in the 1984 film Ghostbusters and its sequels, Ghostbusters II (1989), Ghostbusters: Afterlife (2021), Ghostbusters: Frozen Empire (2024).

The Cadillac is a lyrical part of the song "1960 Cadillac Hearse" by Radio Werewolf.

== Sources ==
- "Classic American Ambulances: 1900-1979 Photo Archive," by Walt McCall and Tom McPherson
