= First call vehicle =

Vehicle for transporting recently deceased individuals

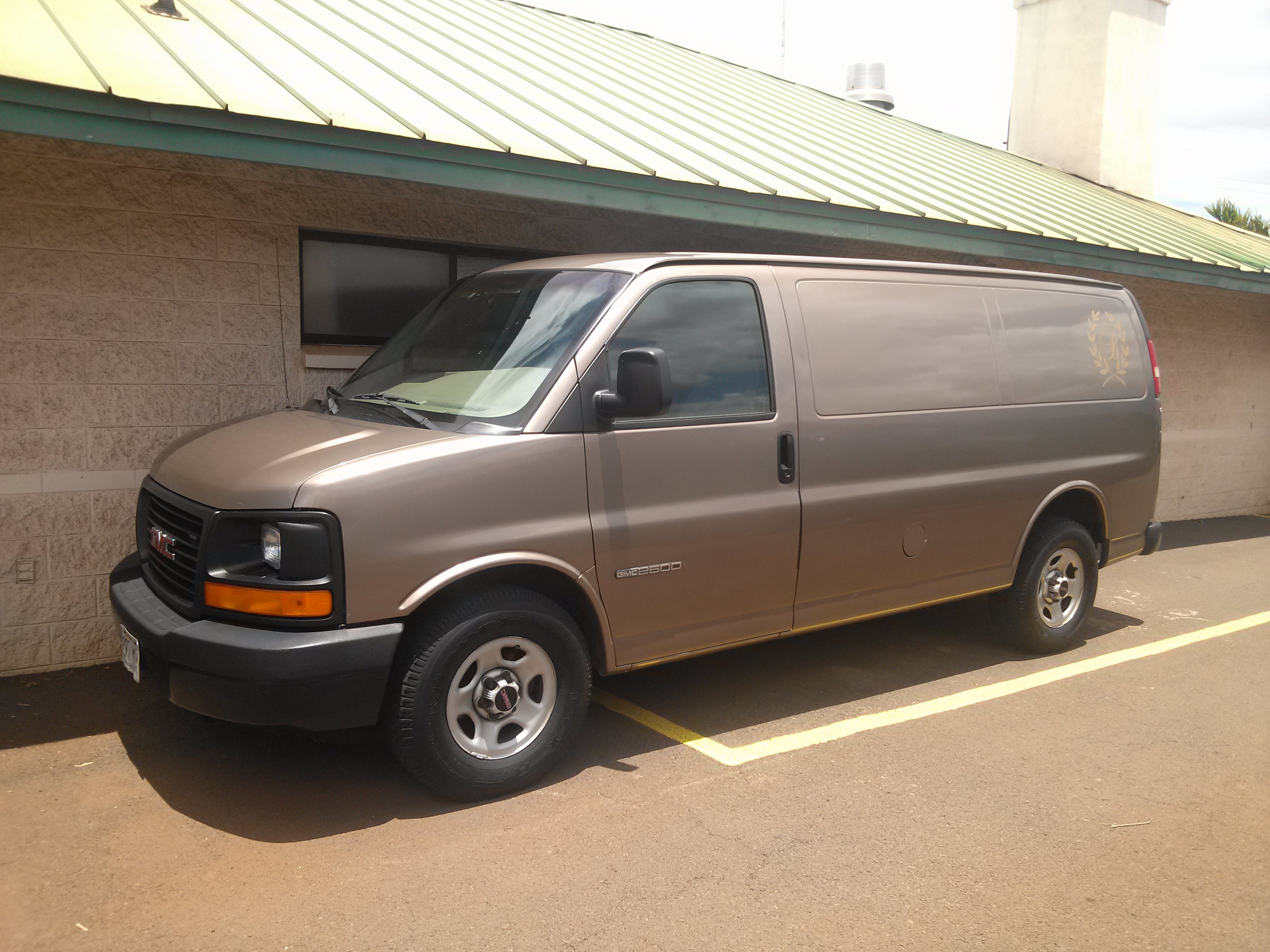
A GMC Savana first call vehicle.

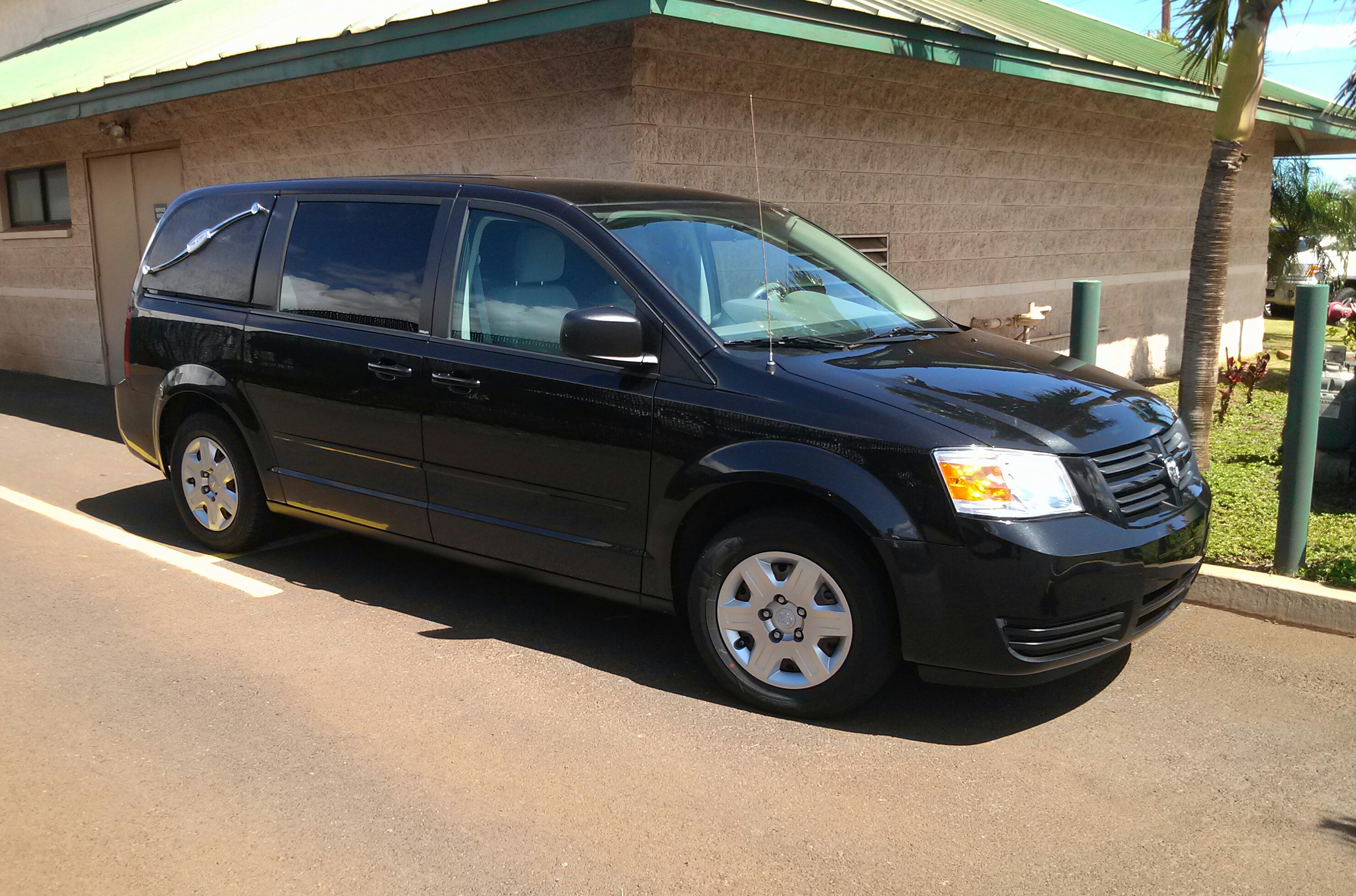
A Dodge Caravan first call vehicle.

The first call vehicle, also known as a private ambulance in the United Kingdom, is a vehicle used in the funeral service industry. This type of vehicle is used to pick up the remains of a recently deceased person, and transport that person to the funeral home for preparation. This initial pickup is called the "first call", hence the name of these vehicles. While some funeral homes will use their hearse for these initial pickups, having vehicles specifically for first calls and using the hearse solely for funerals reduces wear on hearses and makes the first call process more discreet. Sometimes, when the procession portion of funeral protocol comes into play, first call vehicles double as funeral yield vehicles, which grants the procession the right of way.

Today, the vehicles typically used for first call service are minivans. In some cases, funeral homes purchase minivans that have been converted into first call vehicles by the same companies that produce hearses. In other cases, general-purpose minivans are purchased without the rear seats installed.

In the United States, larger SUVs such as the Chevrolet Suburban and Ford Excursion have been employed. Their large wheelbase, pickup truck-derived chassis and larger engines make them popular, well suited to their purpose and requiring little alteration. From the 1970s to the mid-1990s, full-sized station wagons such as the Chevrolet Caprice, Buick Roadmaster and Ford LTD were popular options as well. Conversion on these ranged from tinting or blacking out the rear windows, and installing a metal deck (or sometimes, just bars) to secure the stretcher or casket, to having the rear section modified as a landau and the installation of a casket tray, similar to a hearse. Many of these remain in service.

Frequently, older or retired hearses are employed as a first call vehicle. This is usually more economical for the funeral home when a new hearse is purchased, as opposed to purchasing a second new vehicle.

The first call vehicle is sometimes operated by an outside company that has contracts with various mortuaries and funeral homes, rather than by the funeral homes.

== See also ==
- Hearse
- Ambulance
- Combination car
- Flower car
