= Combination car (ambulance) =

Vehicle that could be either a hearse or an ambulance

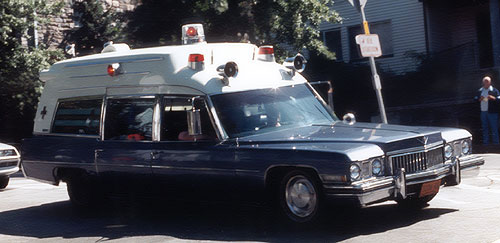
1973 Cadillac ambulance

A combination car is a vehicle that can serve either as a hearse or as an ambulance, and has the capability of being swapped between those roles without much difficulty. In use in the United States until the late 1970s, this hybrid usage of the cars reflected an era when funeral homes offered emergency ambulance service in addition to their primary trade, especially in smaller towns and rural areas.

Combination cars were often built on a Cadillac Commercial Chassis and were customized by coachbuilders such as Superior, Miller-Meteor, Hess & Eisenhardt and Cotner-Bevington.

== Design features ==
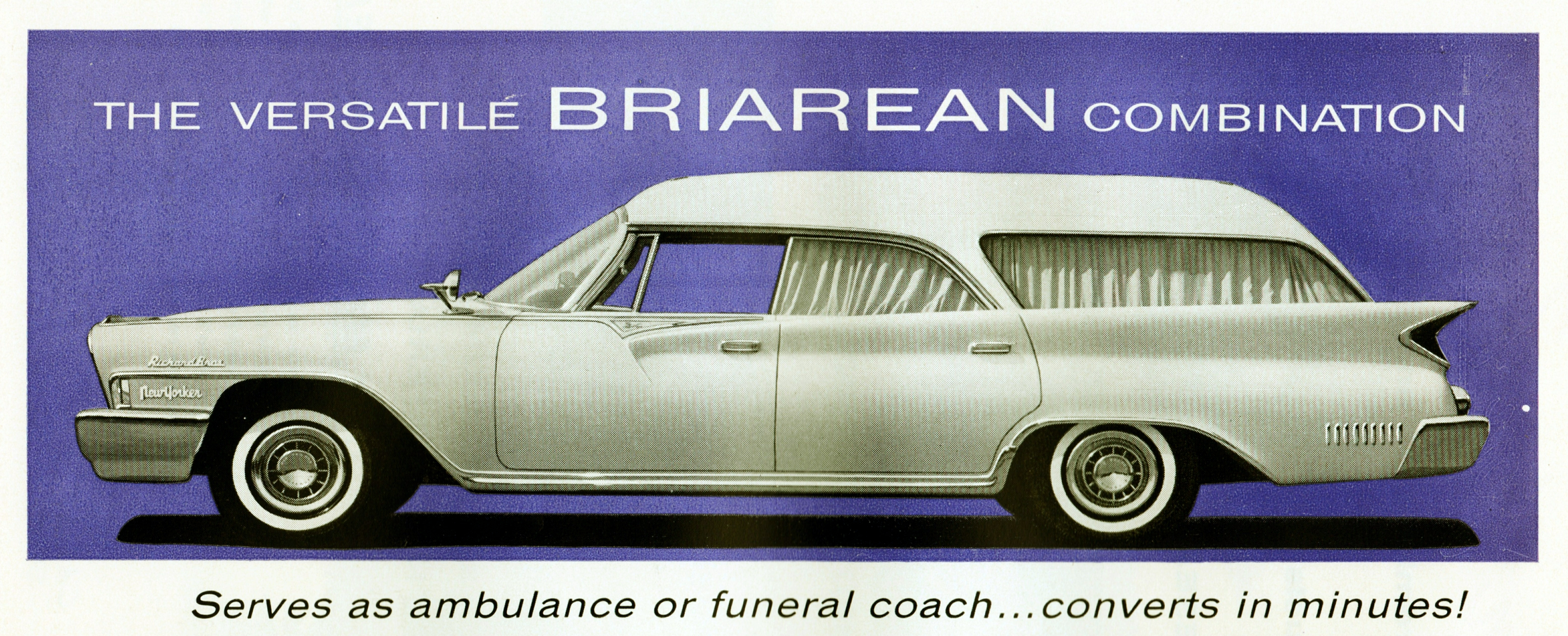
1961 Chrysler New Yorker Briarean Combination

Combination cars often include:

- Flashing lights (mounted or concealed) or a siren. Some cars used rotating roof beacons that could flash either yellow lights in processional mode, or both red and yellow lights in emergency response mode. Alternatively, a hole on the roof was often supplied where a beacon could be bolted on an intermittent basis, with a wire passing through to the driver's compartment where it could be plugged in when needed.
- Two-way radio
- Gurney (stretcher) or a casket. The presence of ambulance technology made combos useful in the first call role, as a gurney is also used in that function.
- Foldable seats on one side in the rear compartment where a first-aid person can sit while looking after a patient on their way to the hospital
- A cabinet where first-aid supplies can be stored

== Decline ==
In the US, usage of passenger car or station wagon derived vehicles as ambulances began to decline in the early 1970s due to federal regulations and a major downsizing of the passenger cars that were used. The state of New York began in 1969 to require ambulances to carry certain equipment and to have trained personnel, limiting the use of combination cars. The use of combination cars became impractical in the US around 1979.
