= Taiwanese Electric Flower Car =

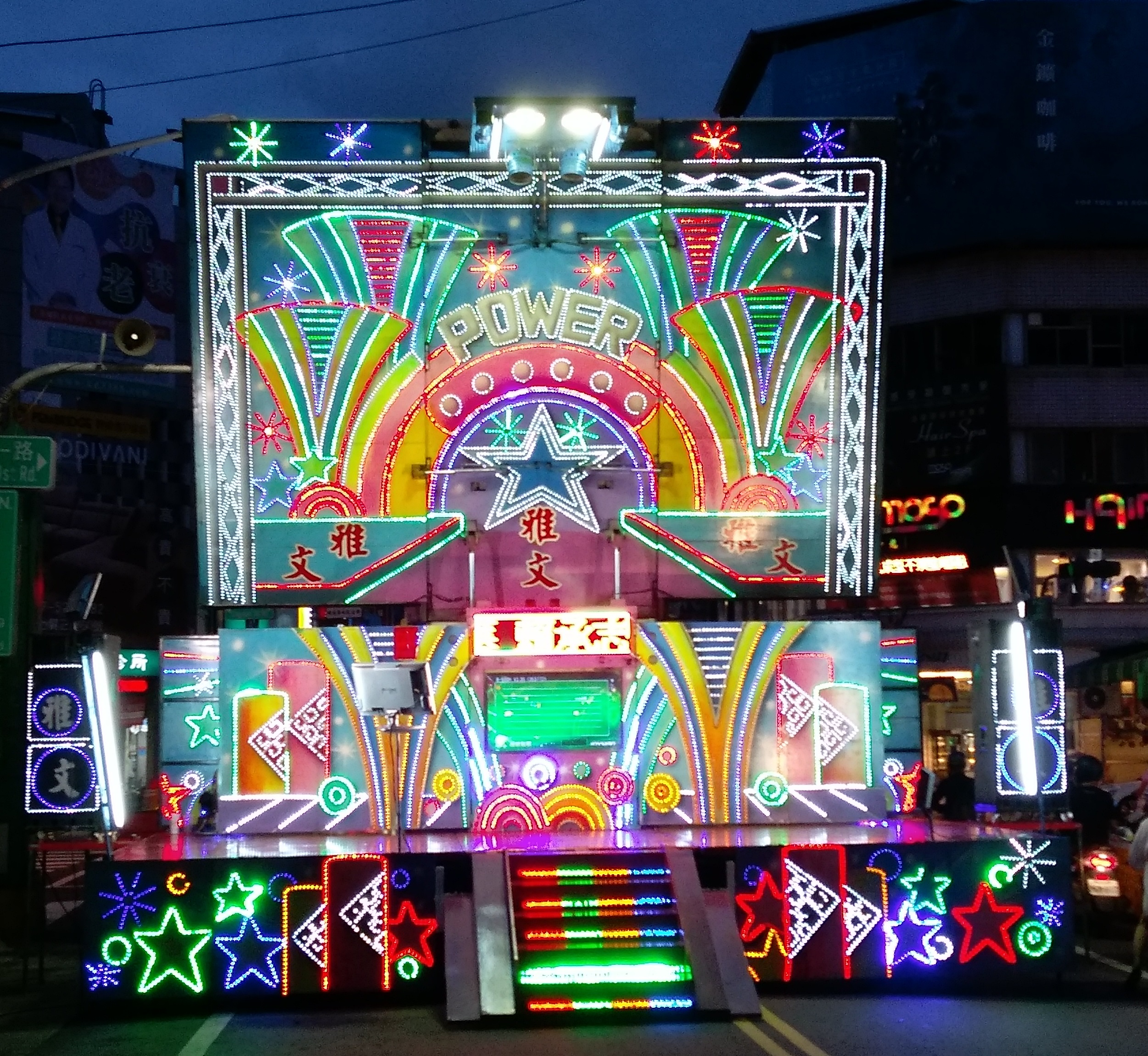
Taiwanese Electric Flower Car in the night.

Taiwanese Electric Flower Cars (traditional: 電子花車, simplified: 电子花车, pinyin: diànzi huā chē) are trucks that have been converted into wheeled, neon-lit platforms, typically moving stages, upon which strippers can perform as the vehicle participates in religious, celebratory or funeral processions. These performances generally include stripping and occasionally involve full-on nudity. A. Marc L. Moskowitz remarked in his making of the documentary Funeral Strippers in Taiwan that stripping down to complete nudity on the Electric Flower Car has gone "underground because there were laws enacted against full nudity in the mid-80's". As such, the tradition of the Electric Flower Car has generated a considerable amount of controversy.

== Traditional funeral practice ==
Despite being used in temple events and community performances, the Electric Flower Car is most well known in the funeral context. Traditionally, females clad in flamboyant and skimpy underwear would dance, sing and strip for the benefit of the dead. Statistically, Traditional burial ritual involves an open casket, the sacrifice of pigs, a procession with many people walking a certain distance to "send off" the deceased. In this practice it is believed that the louder and rowdier the procession, the easier it is for the deceased to cross over to the after-life. Rè Naò, meaning "hot and noisy" in the Chinese language is an indispensable element in a funeral. In the tradition, it is believed that the quality of the deceased after-life is gauged by the number of people who are present to "send off" the deceased during the funeral. A rowdy procession not only symbolize the status of the deceased as having lived a fulfilling life with an abundance of family and friends, it also creates a celebratory mood that is meant to signify the living's willingness at letting the dead move out of the physical world and thus, ensure the dead's smooth journey into the after-life. It marks a celebration rather than one's mournful passing at a funeral.

=== Rè Nào ===
In order to garner crowds and create a successful and exciting public event, strippers are hired to win attention and more importantly, attendance. Strippers arrive in large moving trucks that have been elaborately decorated with neon lights and pumping stereos. Their job is to dance, sing and strip for the deceased in an effort to heighten the atmosphere and please wandering spirits.

=== Religious Association ===
As a part of Taiwan's traditional folk culture, the practice of funeral stripping is closely linked to religious beliefs. It is believed by a large part of the Taiwanese people that higher Gods such as Matzu and Guanyin are more moral than the lower Gods (ghosts of real people whom people pray to and give offering to on specific festivals). However, lower Gods are associated with human vices such as gambling and womanizing. Therefore. if one would like to pray for things of a higher order such as good luck and protection, the higher Gods would be appealed to. If one wants to pray for one's vices such as addiction to drugs, gambling and womanizing, the lower Gods might be appealed to. Moskowitz, in an interview with i09 commented that besides having female strippers to send the deceased off in style, their presence is also to please the lower Gods.

== Controversy ==
Due to the nature of the practice, laws have been enacted in the 1980s to limit the amount of exposure female strippers reveal during performances. The tradition of the Electric Flower Car have since moved out of Taiwan's urban centers into rural areas skirting cities. It is observed that these practices are more widespread in the South, a part of Taiwan that is associated with the working class, lack of solid education and more local traditions. In this light, funeral stripping have also involved itself in the discourse of the north and south, a split of culture that has always featured prominently in modern Taiwanese culture discourses. With the upper class men in Taipei complaining about the harmful effect of this practice on social morality, this practice has not only almost disappeared from the northern parts of Taiwan but is also slowly ebbing out as it proved to be incompatible with Taiwan's participation with a global culture.

There exist stereotypes and criticism of female funeral strippers in Taiwan. To some they appear as promiscuous, to others who wholly reject the impetus behind the practice look down on their profession. Strippers themselves, according to Moskowitz, come from generations who have been in the funereal or stripping business and thus see themselves as professionals.

== Law ==
Like most folk sponsored practices such as the night markets in Taiwan, funeral stripping does not seem to be rubbing shoulders with the law, not if necessary. Moskowitz in his documentary observed that law enforces such as policemen and politicians themselves are sometimes present during these events. Managers of the event are careful to restrict the amount of skin shown during the performances.

== See also ==
- Flower car
- Float (parade)
- Lovemobile
