= Hearse =

Large funeral vehicle

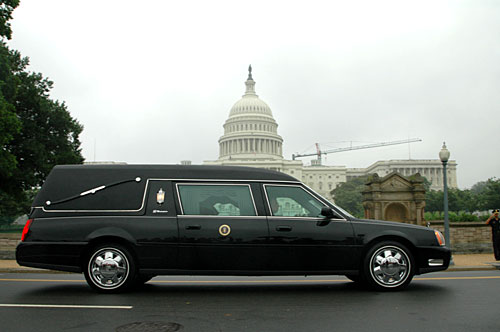
Cadillac hearse used at the state funeral of Ronald Reagan

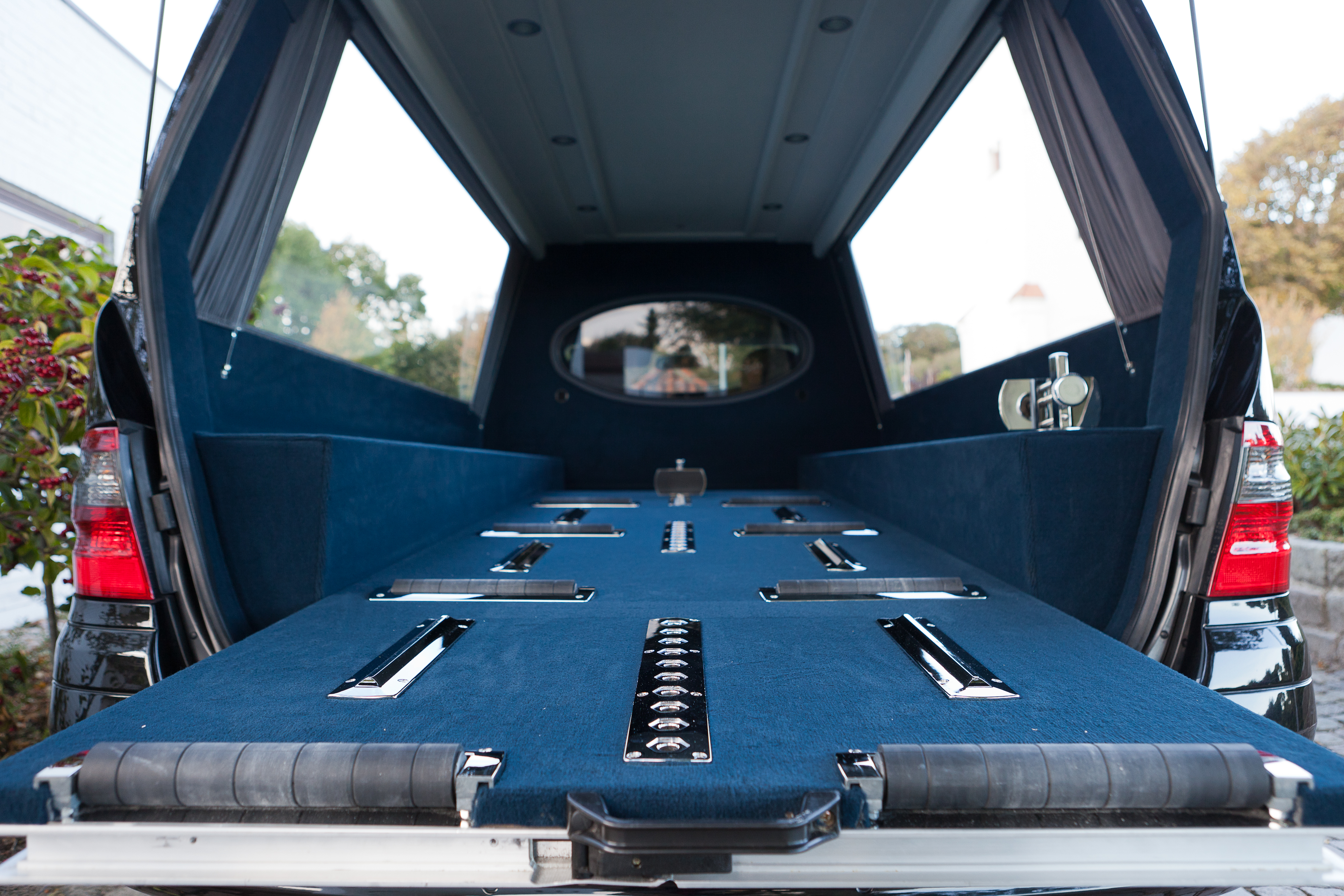
Interior of a hearse in Denmark

A hearse (/hɜːrs/) is a large vehicle - originally a horse carriage but later with the introduction of motor vehicles, a car - used to carry the body of a deceased person in a coffin to a funeral, wake, or graveside service. They range from deliberately anonymous vehicles to heavily decorated vehicles.

In the funeral trade of some countries hearses are called funeral cars or funeral coaches.

== History ==
The name is derived, through the French herse, from the Latin herpex or irpex, which means a harrow. The funeral hearse was originally a wooden or metal framework, which stood over the bier or coffin and supported the pall. It was provided with numerous spikes to hold burning candles, and, owing to the resemblance of these spikes to the teeth of a harrow, was called a hearse. Later on, the word was applied, not only to the construction above the coffin, but to any receptacle in which the coffin was placed. Thus from about 1650 it came to denote the vehicle on which the dead are carried to the grave.

Hearses were originally hand-drawn then horse-drawn after the decoration and weight of the hearse increased. The first electric motorized hearses were introduced to the United States in the early 1900s. Petrol-powered hearses began to be produced from 1907 and, after slow initial uptake due to their high cost, became widely accepted in the 1920s. The vast majority of hearses since then have been based on larger, more powerful car chassis, generally retaining the front end up to and possibly including the front doors but with custom bodywork to the rear to contain the coffin.

Examples of horse-drawn hearses and two hand-drawn hearses

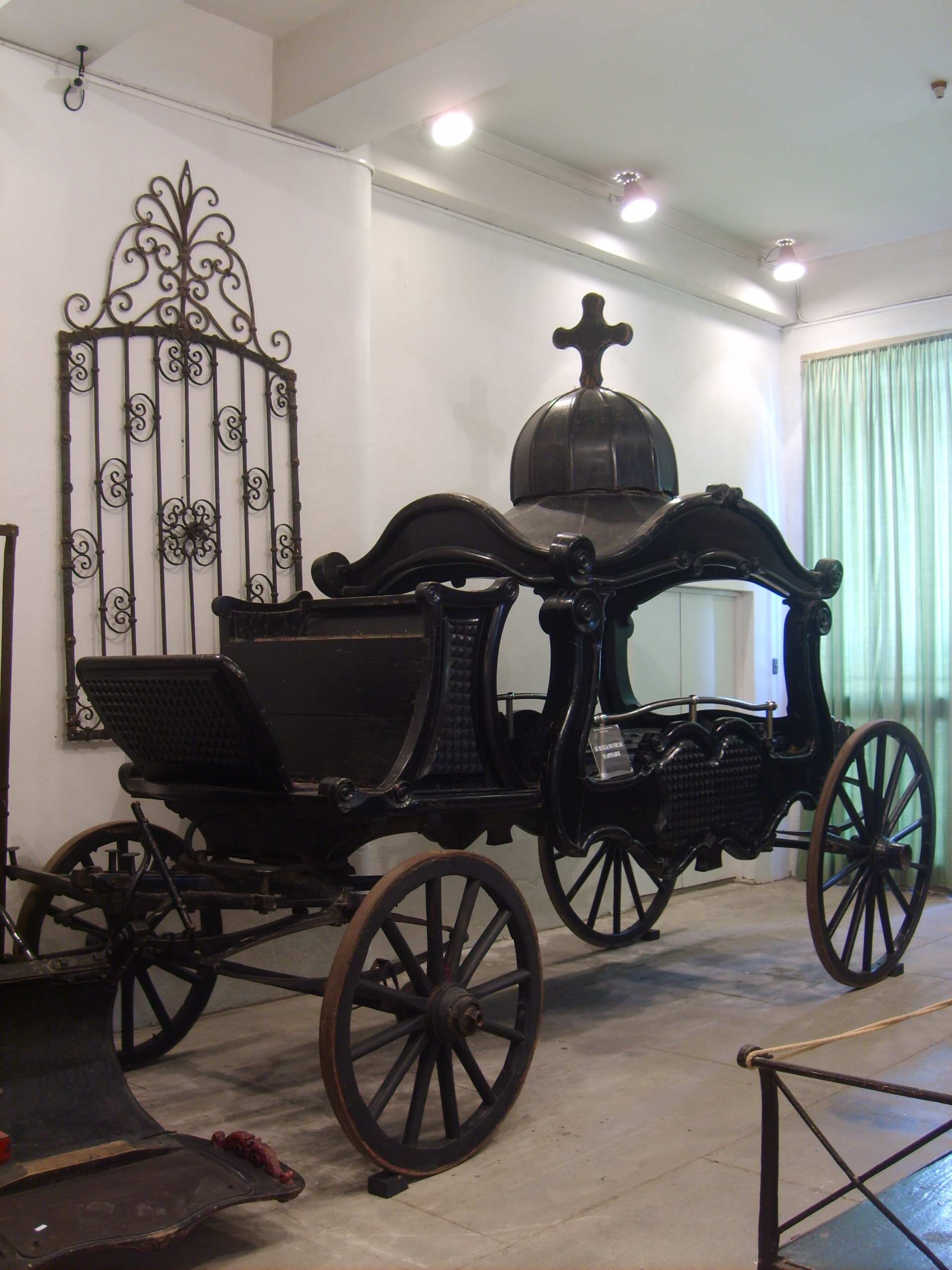
Museo del Carmen de Maipú Maipú, Chile

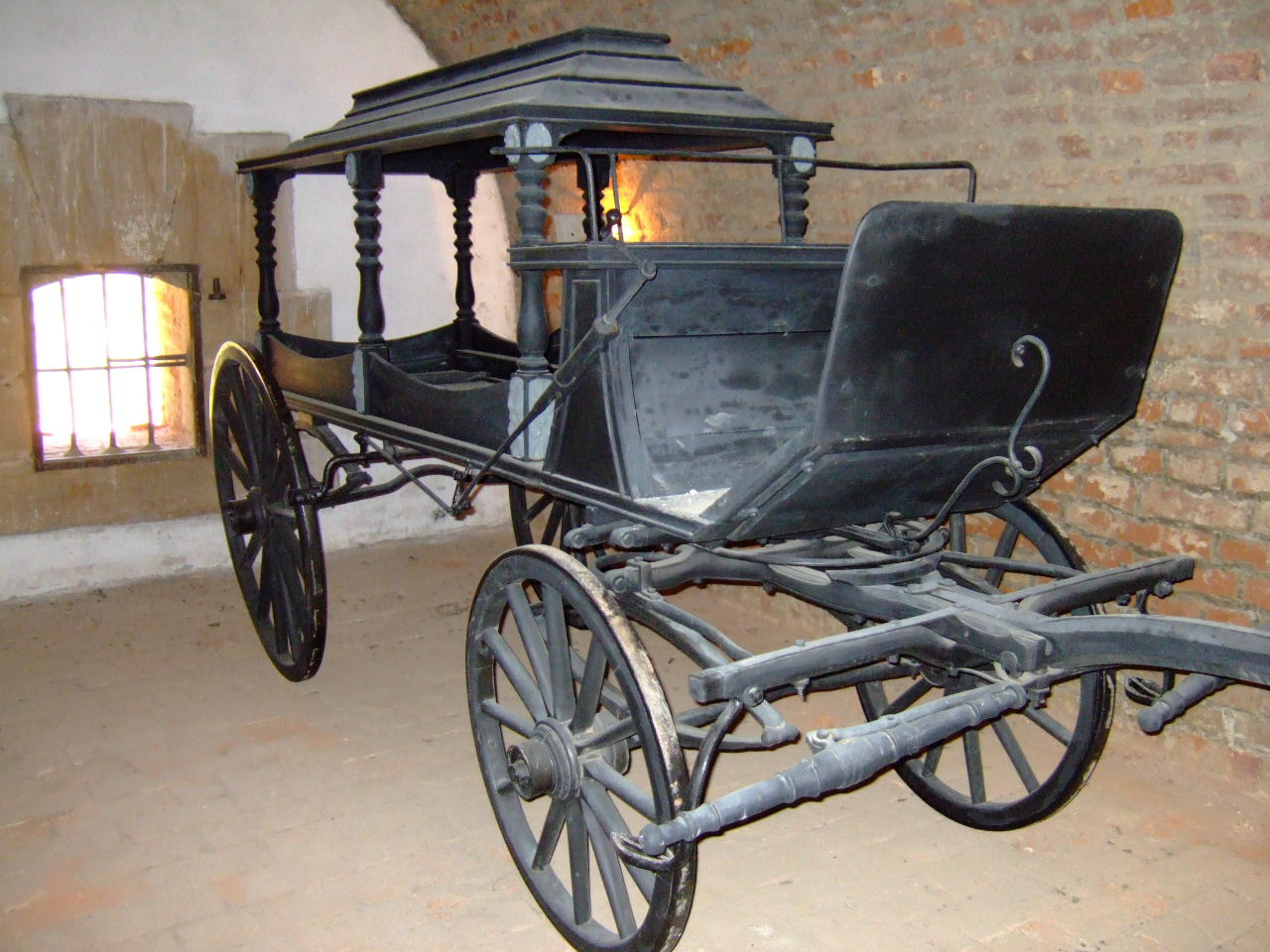
Jewish hearse, Theresienstadt concentration camp, Terezín, Czech Republic

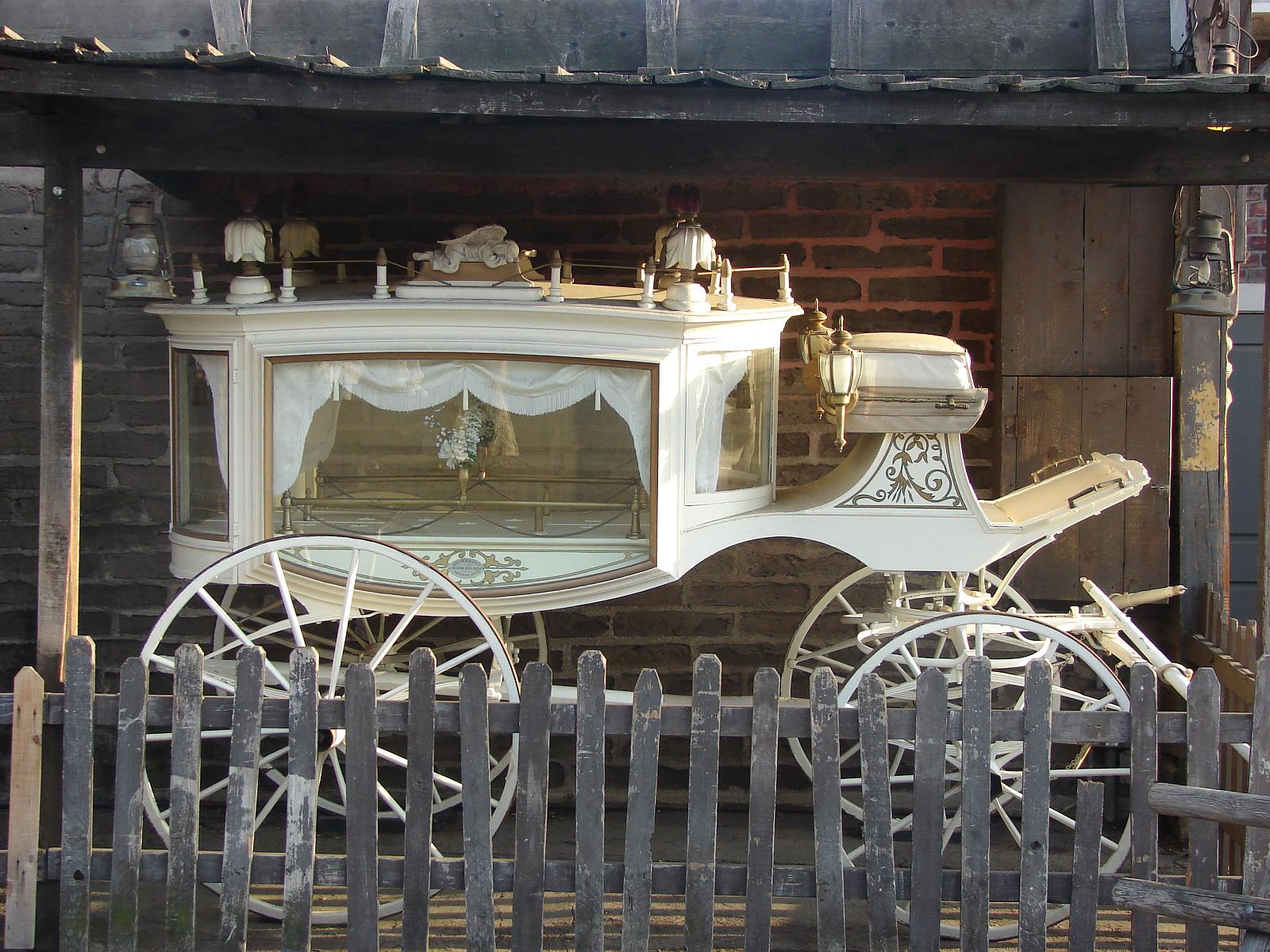
White hearse, USA

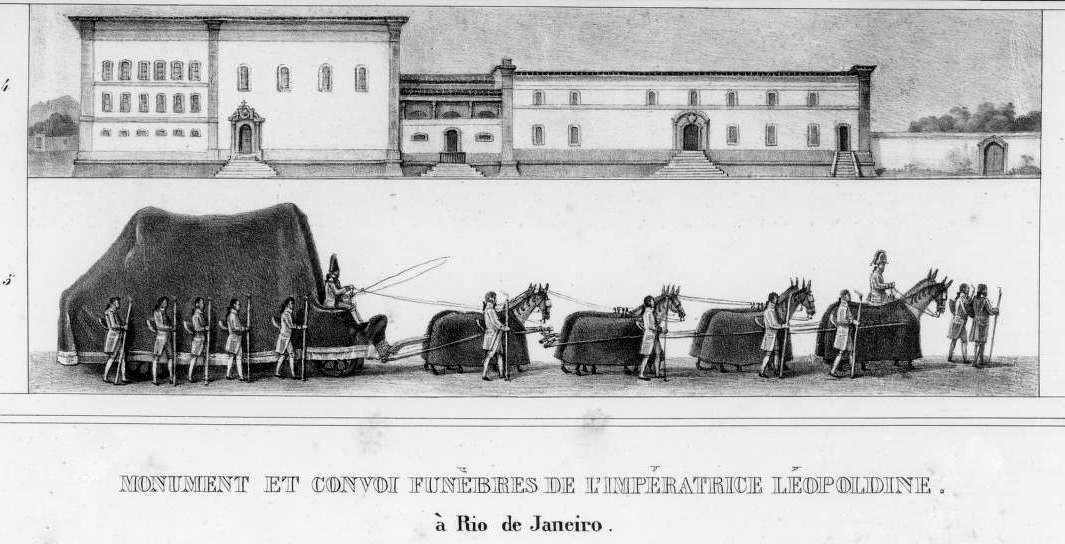
Funeral procession of Empress Maria Leopoldina of Brazil with a horse-drawn hearse, 1826

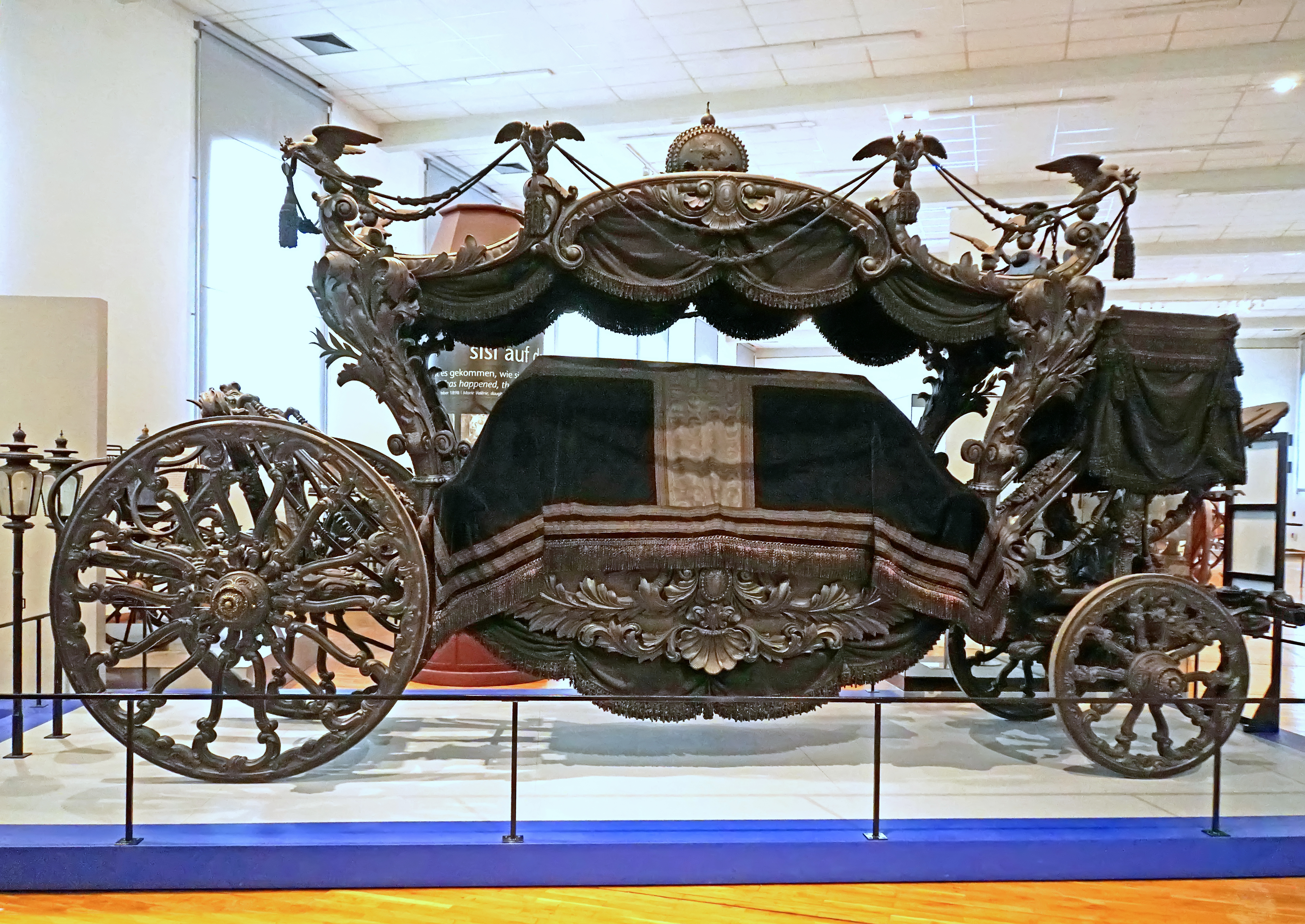
Imperial hearse from Austria, c. 1888

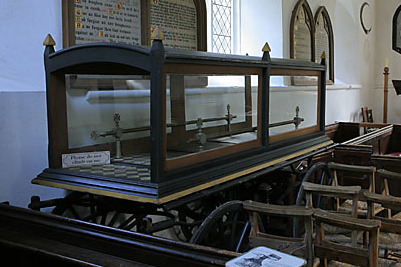
Hand-drawn hearse

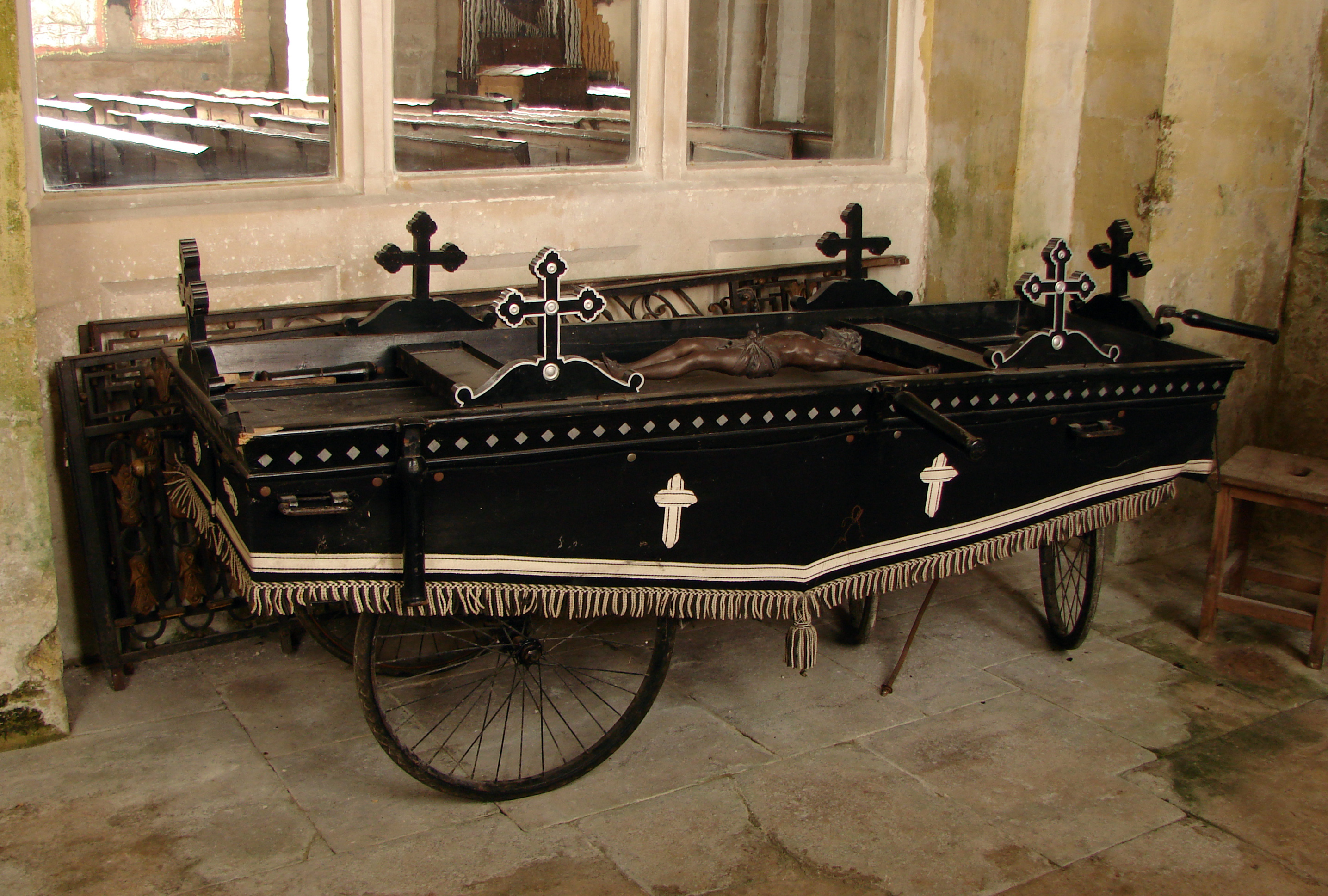
Hand-drawn hearse (church of Arc-en-Barrois, France)
Examples of motorized hearses

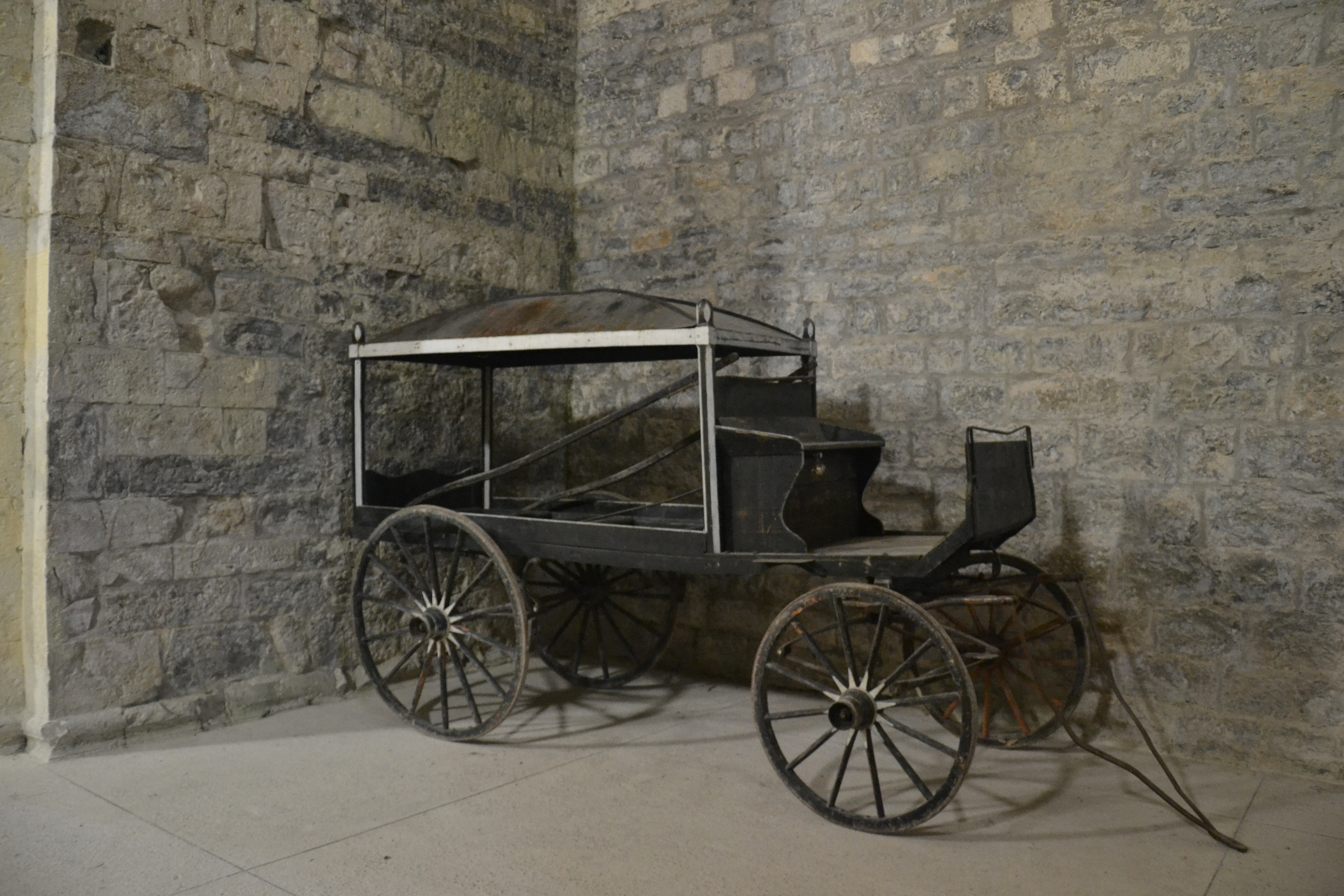
A hearse hippomobile (France)

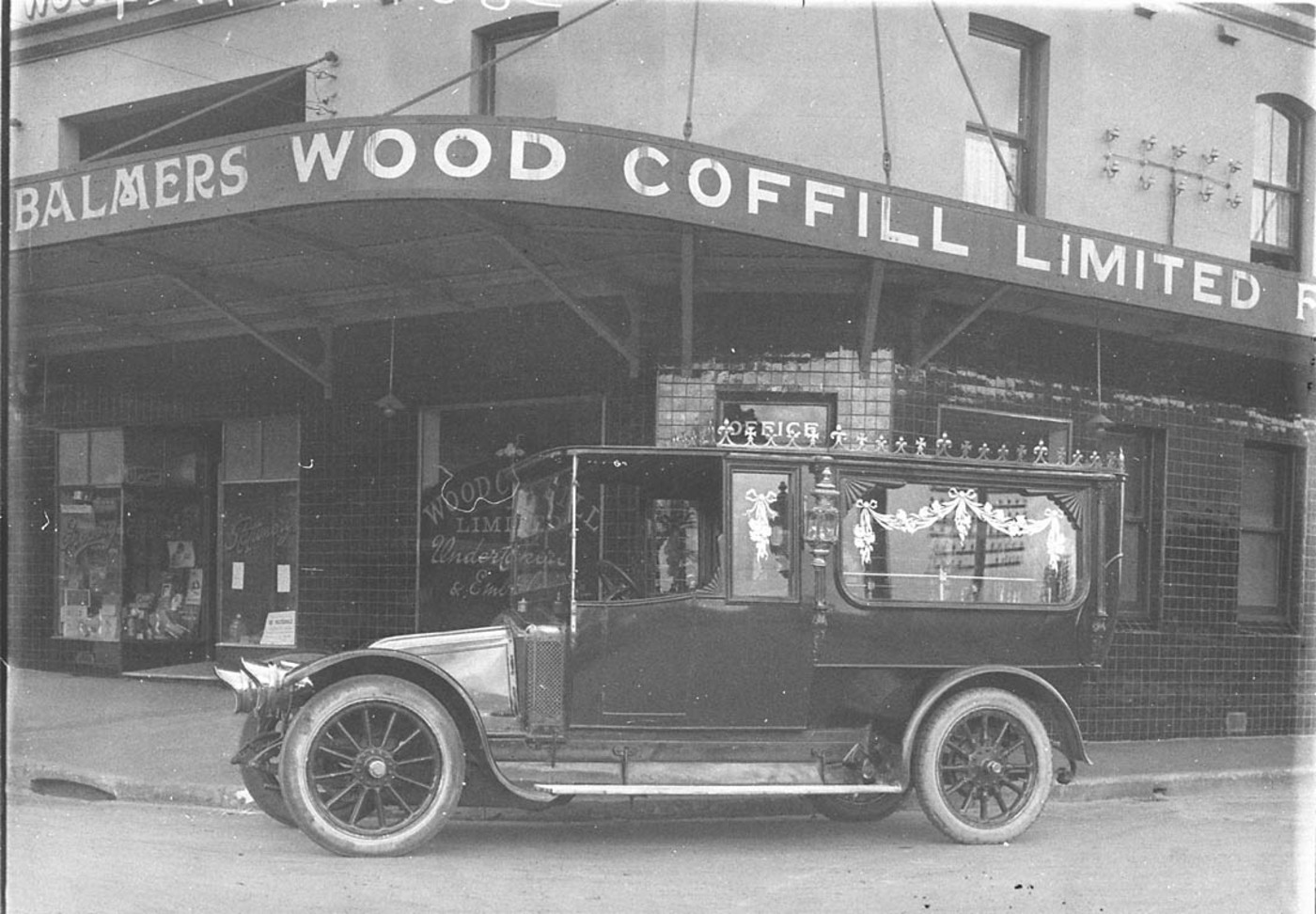
1919 model Renault hearse, Australia, c. 1930

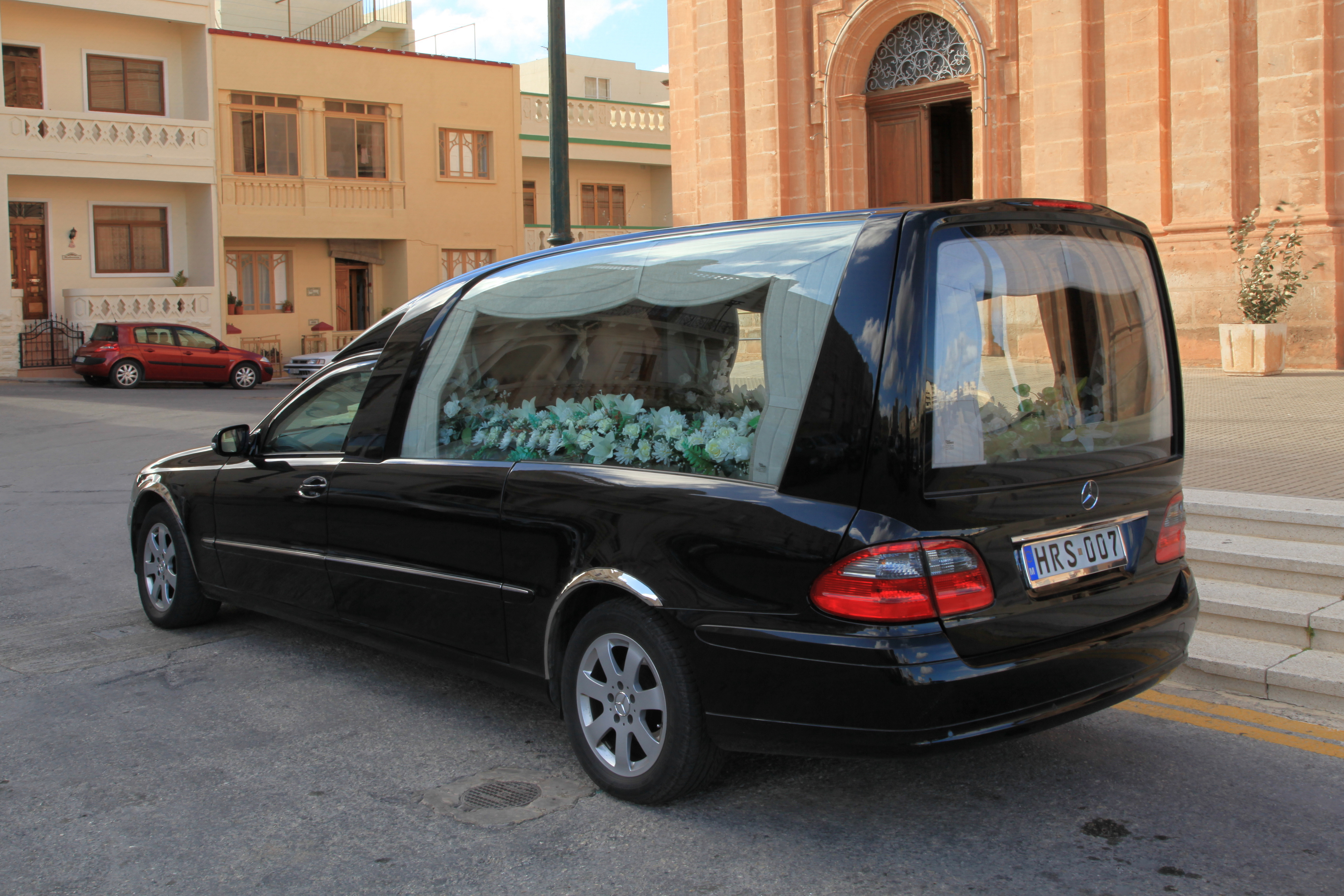
Modern hearse

== First call vehicles ==
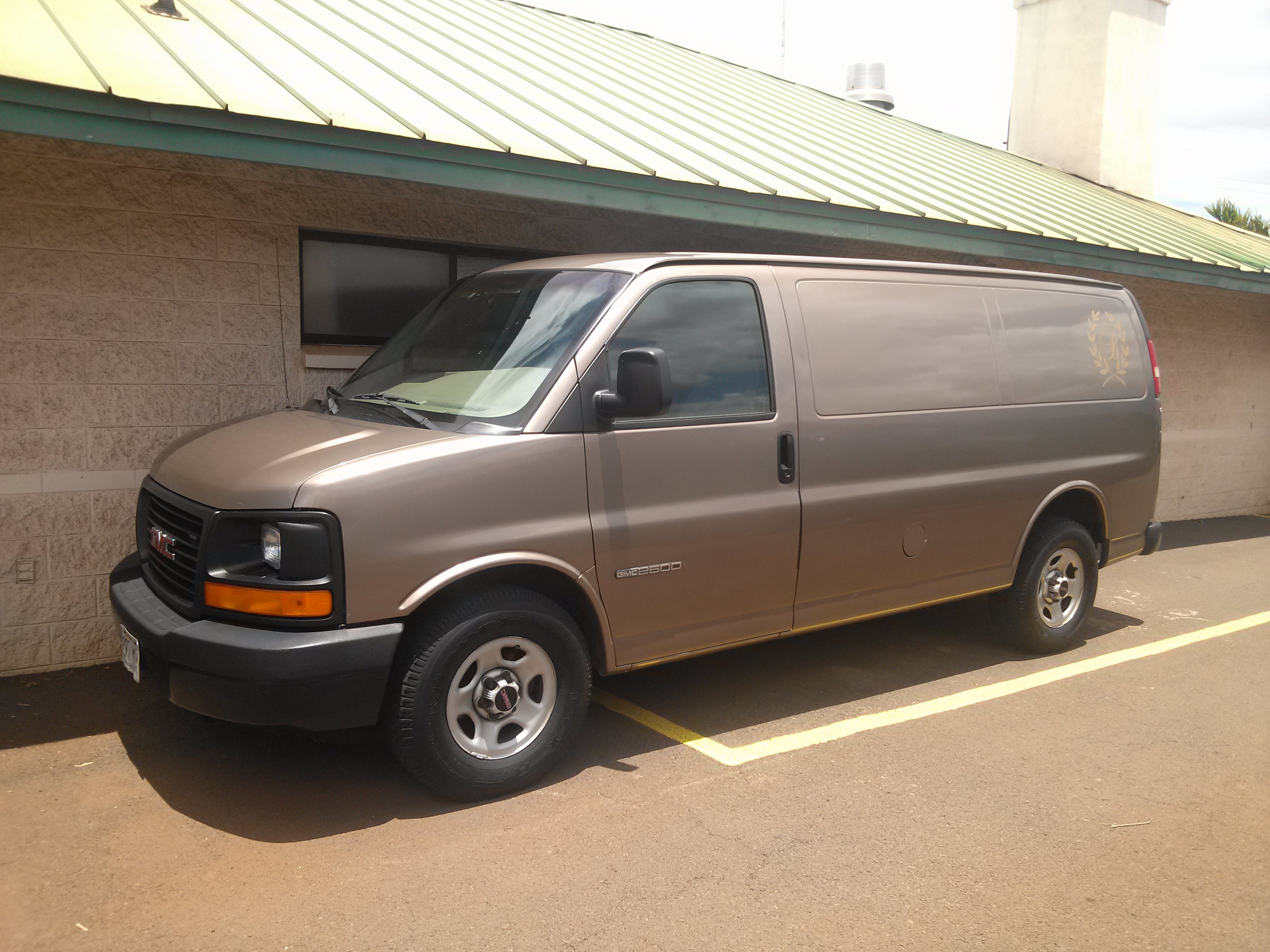
A GMC Savana in use as a first call vehicle in the United States

A first call vehicle is used to pick up the remains of a recently deceased person, and transport them to a funeral home or morgue.

== Rail transport ==
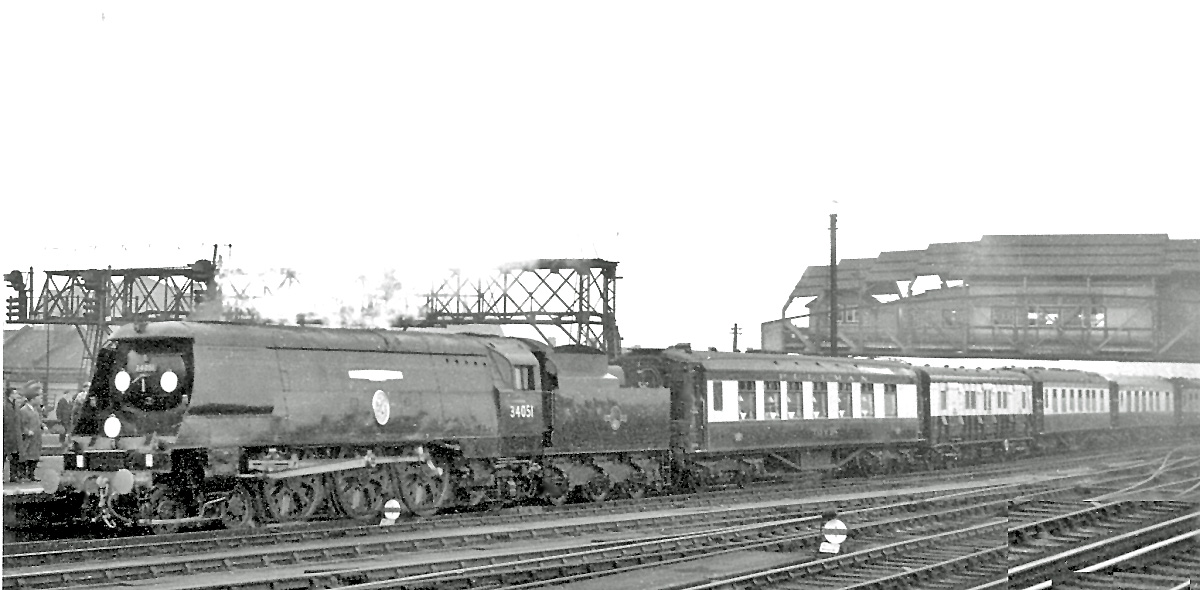
Sir Winston Churchill's funeral train, pulled by the steam locomotive Winston Churchill

A few big cities provided special rail lines and/or funeral trolley cars and/or subway cars to carry bodies and mourners to remote cemeteries such as in Sydney, NSW and London and tram services were common. Chicago, Illinois operated 3 different funeral trolley cars over the elevated tracks in downtown Chicago to outlying cemeteries in the western suburbs. A special funeral bureau handled the funeral trains which sometimes operated 3–4 funeral trains a week over the "L".

== Motorcycle hearses ==
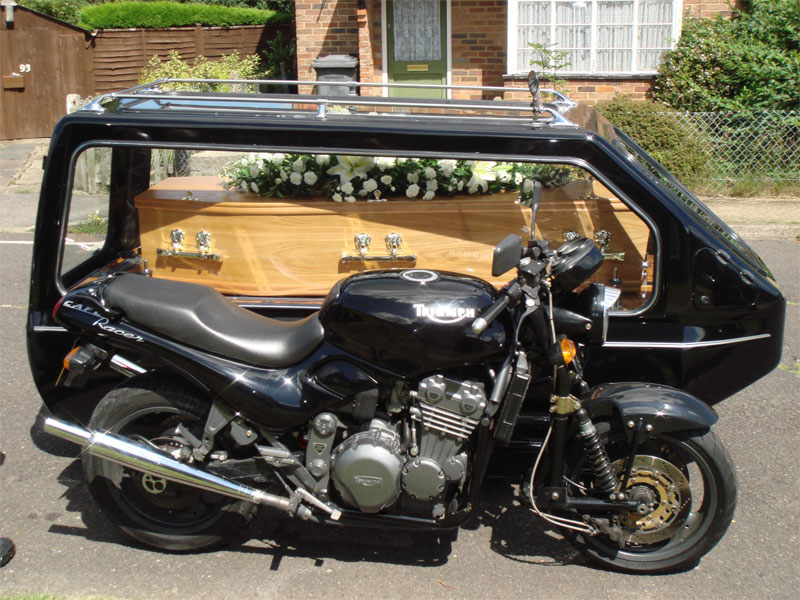
Motorcycle hearse

A motorcycle hearse may be used during the funeral of a motorcycle enthusiast. It is either a motorcycle with a sidecar built to carry a casket or urn at the side of the rider, or a trike that carries the casket behind the rider.

== Modern usage ==
Two styles of formal hearse bodywork are common. One style has opaque rear panels so the coffin is barely glimpsed. This American style is fitted with a heavily padded leather or vinyl roof and each side decorated with large mock landau bars resembling the braces used for the folding leather tops on some horse-drawn carriages. The other has narrow pillars and large windows revealing the coffin.

Since the working life of a hearse is generally one of light duty and short, sedate drives, hearses often remain serviceable for a long time and hearses 30 years old or more may still be in service. Due to the costs of owning an expensive custom vehicle that sits idle "80 to 90 percent of the week", individual funeral homes reduce costs by renting or utilizing a shared motor pool.

Perhaps owing to the morbid associations of the hearse, its luxurious accommodations for the driver, or both, the hearse has a number of enthusiasts who own and drive retired hearses. There are several hearse clubs.

=== North America ===
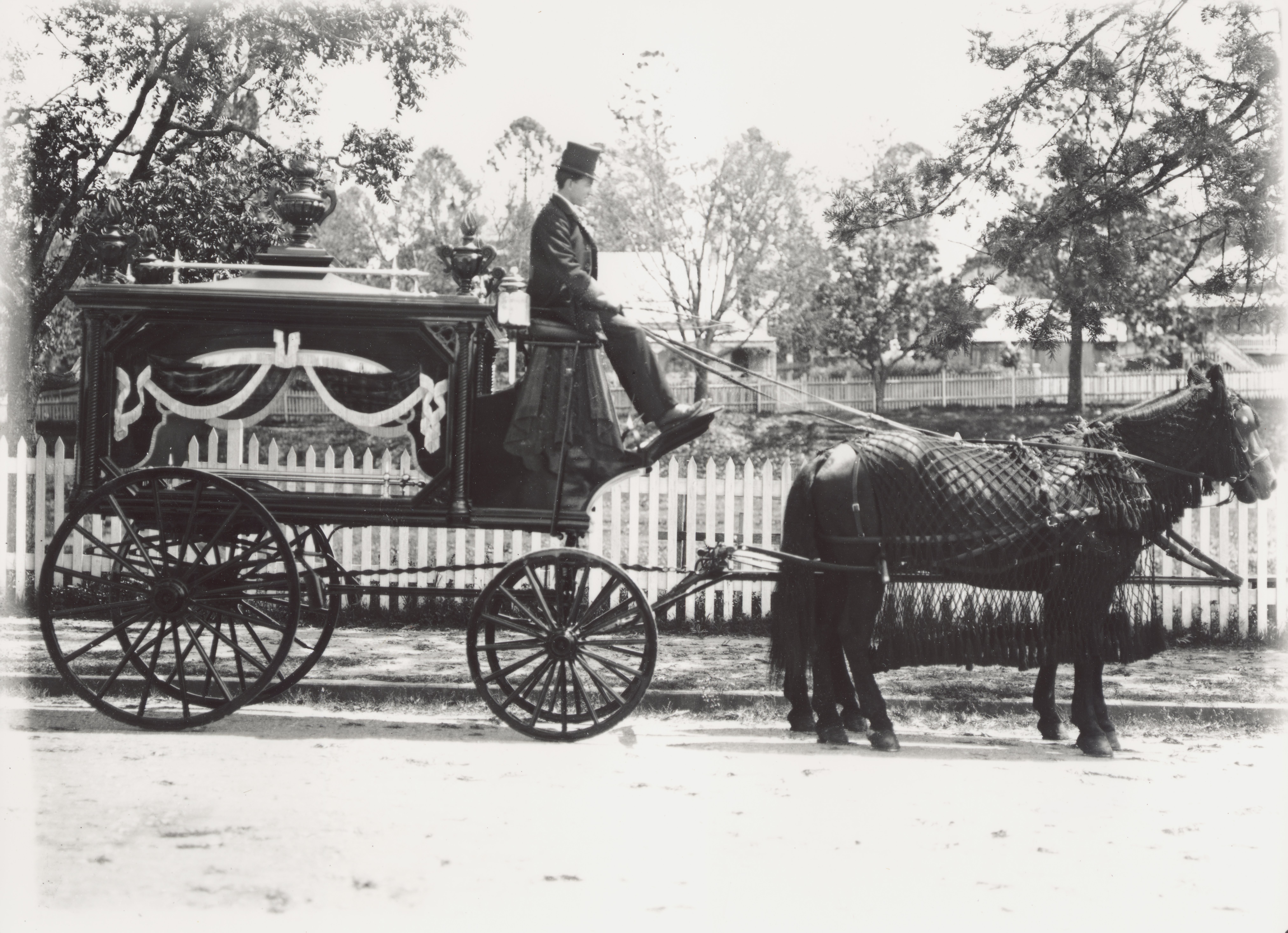
A. E. E Roberts Carriage Works hearse, circa 1900

Usually, more luxurious automobile brands are used as a base for funeral cars; since the 1930s, the vast majority of hearses in the United States and Canada have been Cadillacs and less frequently, Lincolns.

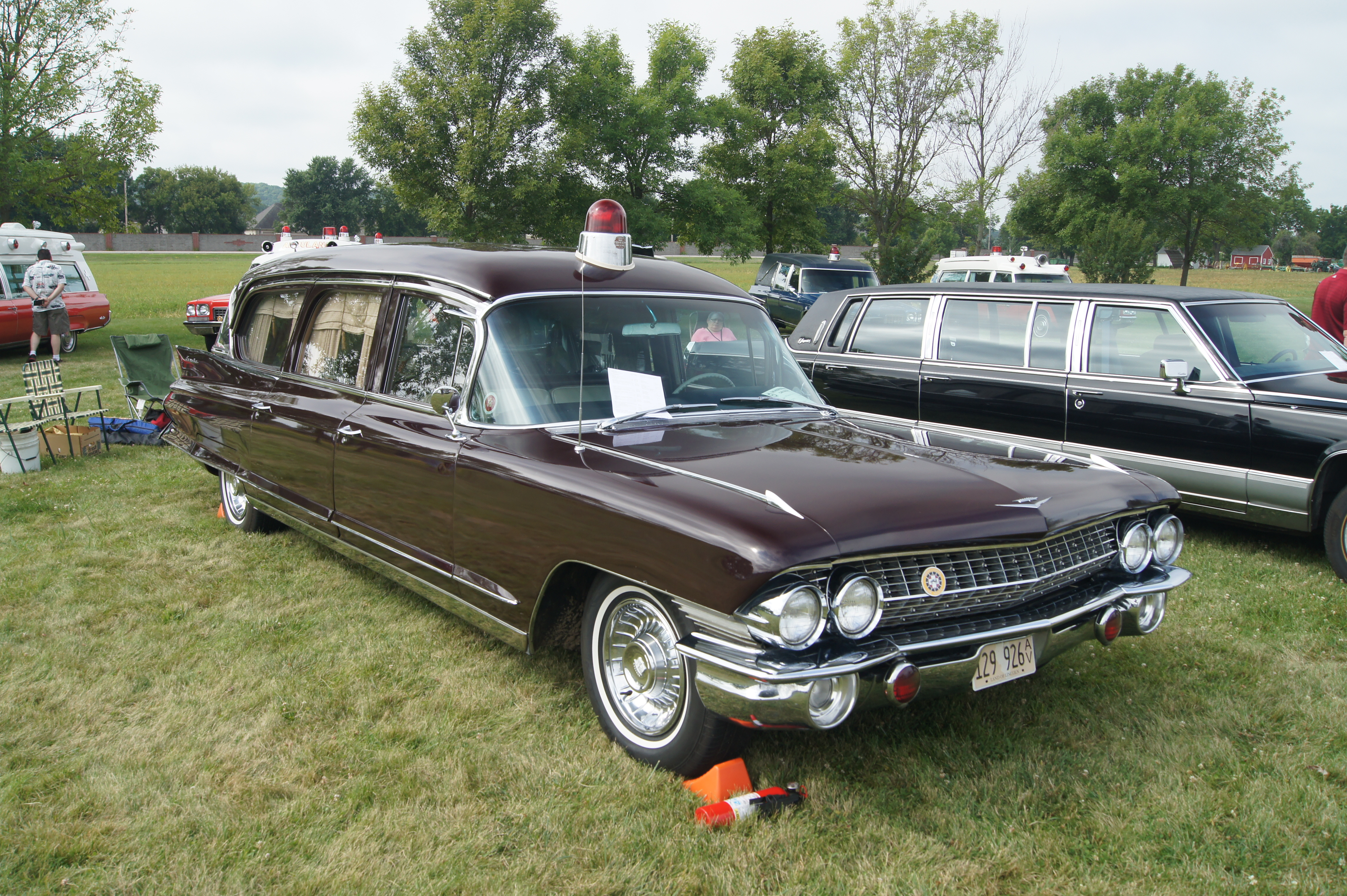
Combination Ambulance-hearse on a Cadillac Eureka

The Cadillac Commercial Chassis was a longer and strengthened version of the long-wheelbase Fleetwood limousine frame to carry the extra weight of bodywork, rear deck and cargo. The rear of the Cadillac commercial chassis was considerably lower than the passenger car frame, thereby lowering the rear deck height as well for ease of loading and unloading. The Cadillac hearses were shipped as incomplete cars to coachbuilders for final assembly. Since the late 1990s, most Cadillac based funeral cars have been constructed from modified Cadillac sedans, until late 2019; The XTS chassis was discontinued from General Motors, and as such any new Cadillac hearse will be built on the XT5 SUV chassis, with the S&S Coach Company now building certain models of hearse on the XT6 platform.

The fleet division of Ford Motor Company sells a Lincoln Town Car with a special "hearse package" strictly to coachbuilders. Shipped without rear seat, rear interior trim, rear window or decklid, the hearse package also features upgraded suspension, brakes, charging system and tires. This was replaced with the Lincoln MKT, which has also been discontinued, followed by the Continental which also was discontinued after a short run.

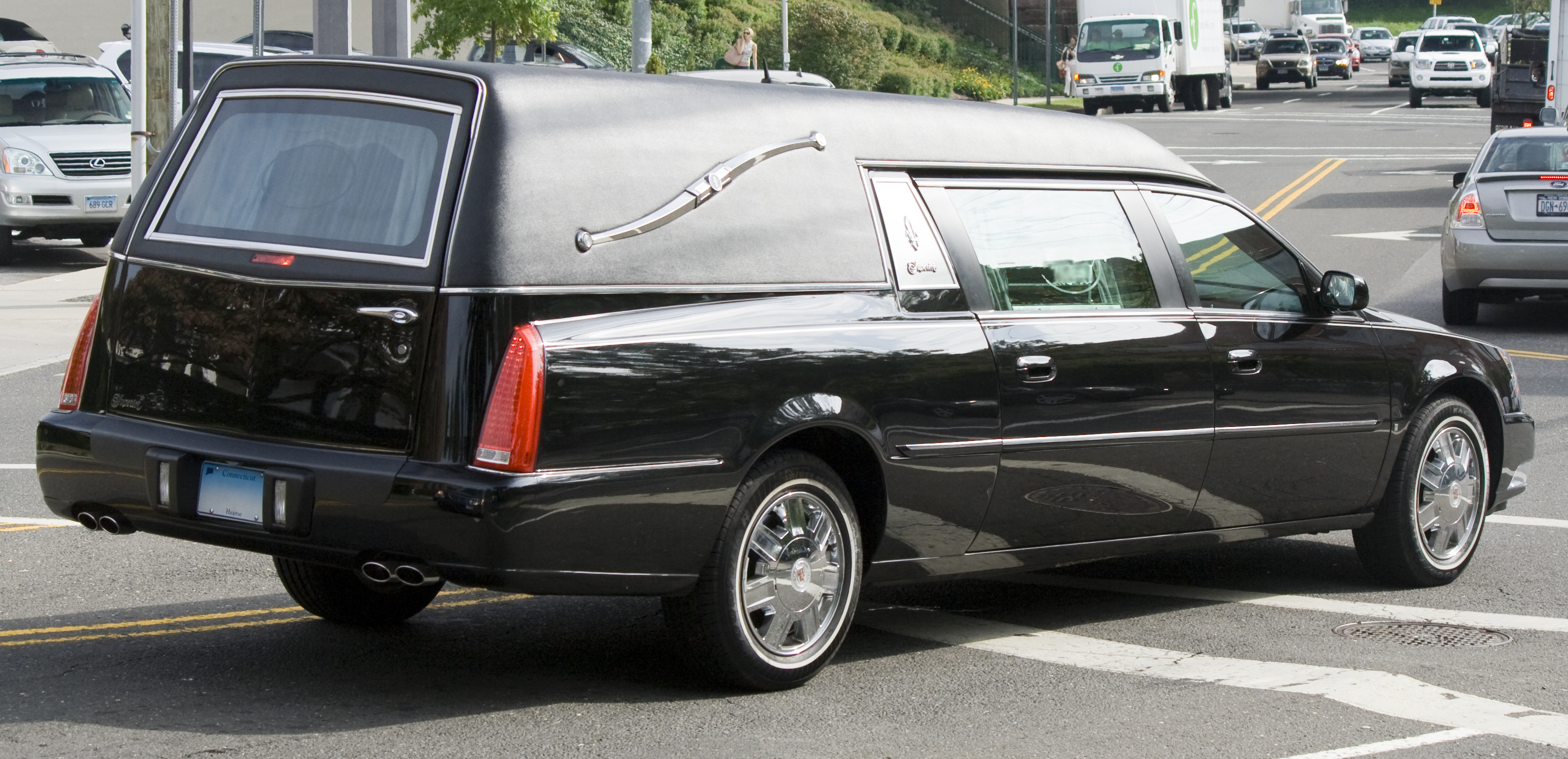
Cadillac DTS hearse with curtained up windows

The limousine style of hearse is more popular in the United States. It is common practice in the US for the windows to be curtained, while in other countries the windows are normally left unobscured.

Until the 1970s, it was common for many hearses to also be used as ambulances, due to the large cargo capacity in the rear of the vehicle. These vehicles were called "combination cars" and were especially used in small towns and rural areas. Car-based ambulances and combination coaches were unable to meet stricter Federal specifications for such vehicles and were discontinued after 1979.

=== Europe ===
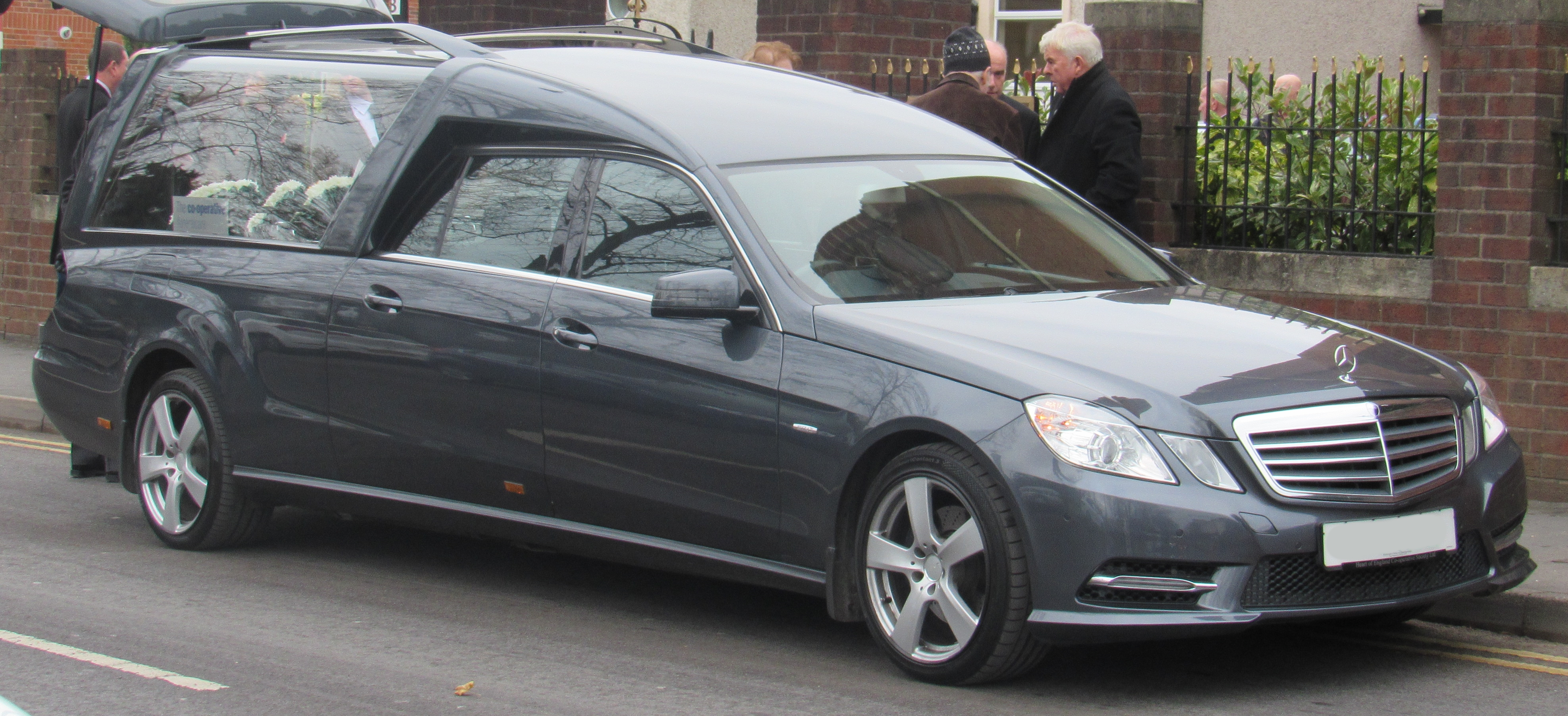
Mercedes-Benz E-Class hearse

Coachbuilders mostly modify Mercedes-Benz, but they also do it with Jaguar, Ford, Opel/Vauxhall Motors and Volvo products. Some second-hand Rolls-Royce cars have traditionally been used as hearses though the high cost of newer models is generally considered prohibitive.

=== Japan ===
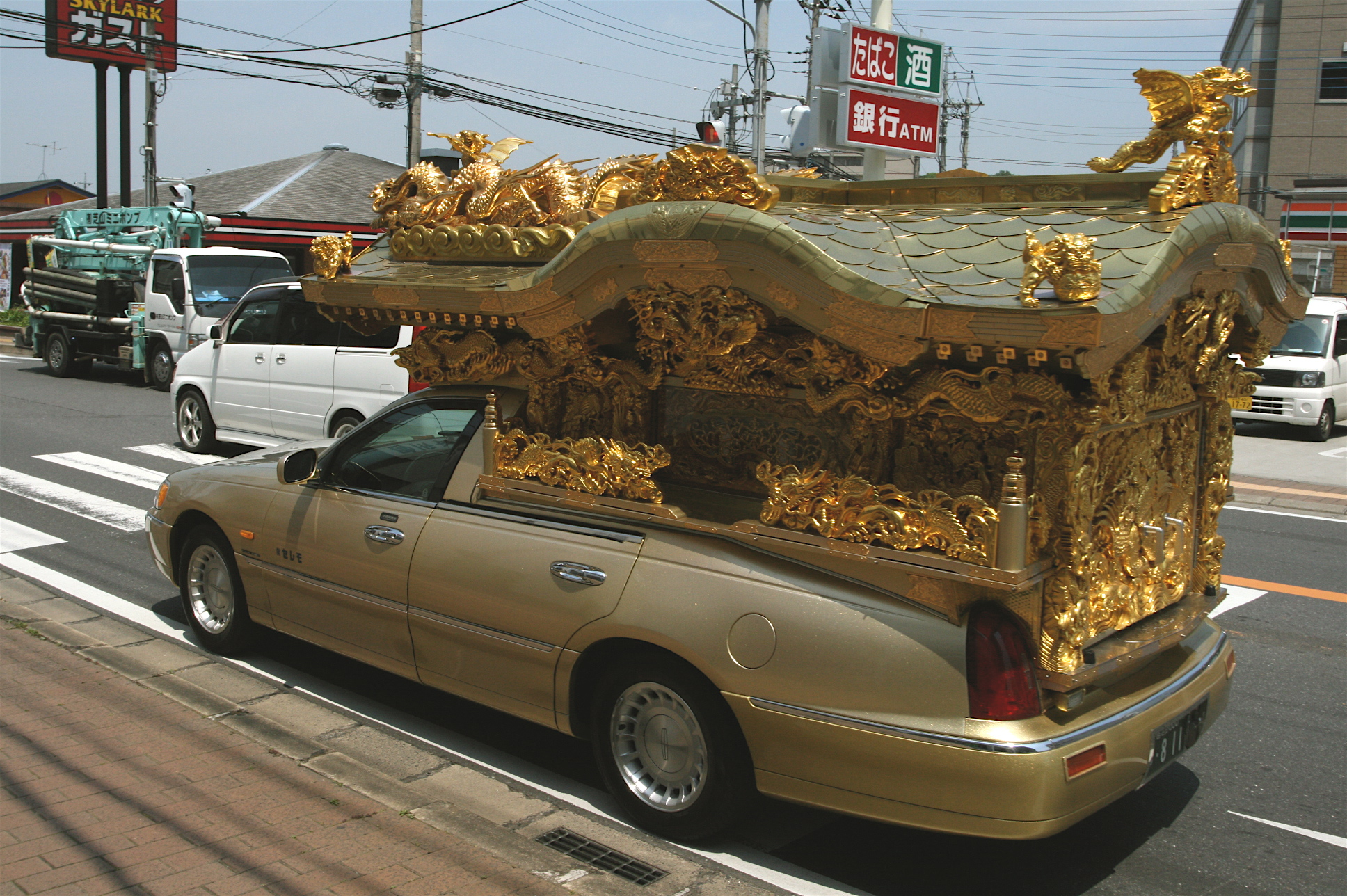
"Japanese"-style Lincoln Town Car hearse, with standard wheelbase

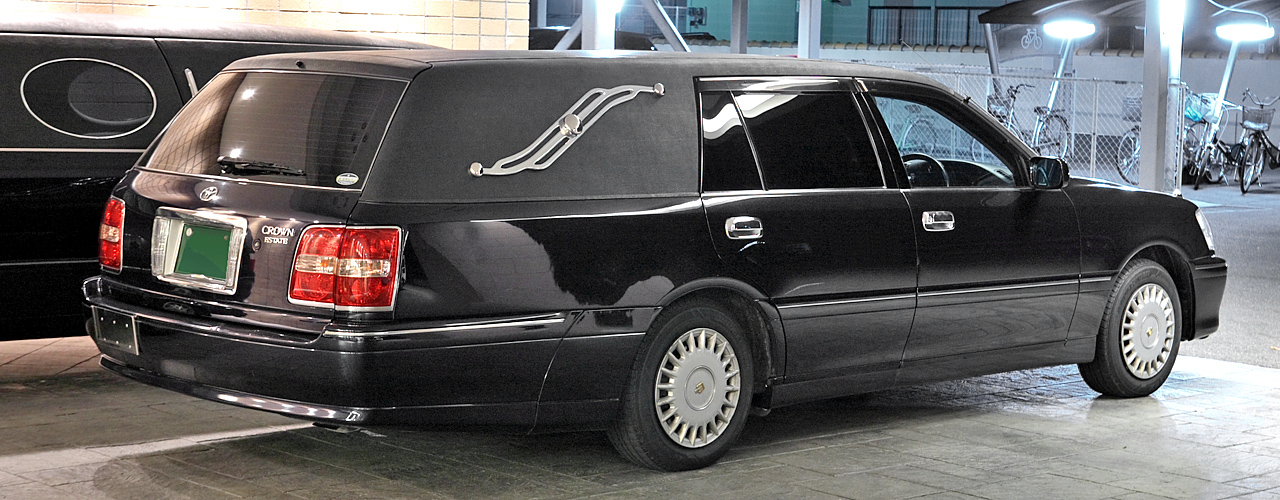
"Foreign"-style Toyota Crown Estate hearse, with stretched rear overhang

In Japan, hearses, called reikyūsha (霊柩車), can come in two styles: "Foreign" style, which is similar in build and style to an American hearse, or a "Japanese" style, in which the rear area of the vehicle is modified to resemble a small, ornate Buddhist temple.

The Japanese-style hearse generally requires the rear of the vehicle to be extensively altered; commonly, the rear roof is cut away from the front windows back and all interior parts are removed from the rear as well. The ornate Buddhist-style rear area, generally constructed of wood and in which the casket or urn is placed, is built on top of this empty cavity and most often is wider than the base of the vehicle, so that it sticks out on the sides, over the rear body panels. Popular bases for these hearses are large sedans, minivans and pickup trucks.

The ornaments on a Japanese-style hearse vary by region. Nagoya style decorates both the upper and lower halves of the car body. Kansai style has a relatively modest decorations unpainted. Kanazawa style is known for having a red body (other styles mostly have black bodies) with gilded ornaments. Tokyo style, found anywhere else in Japan, features painted/gilded ornaments on the upper half of the body.

"Foreign" style hearses are mostly similar in appearance to their US counterparts, although their exterior dimensions and interiors reflect the Japanese preference for smaller, less ornate caskets (this in light of the national preference for cremation). This means that, in contrast to American hearses, the rear quarter panels require less, and sometimes no, alteration. These are generally built from station wagons such as the Nissan Stagea, or from executive sedans such as the Toyota Celsior (Lexus LS in the US) and Nissan Cima (Infiniti Q45 in the US). American market vehicles such as the Lincoln Town Car and Cadillac DeVille, which are otherwise fairly uncommon in Japan, are often converted to hearses in both styles.

=== Hong Kong ===
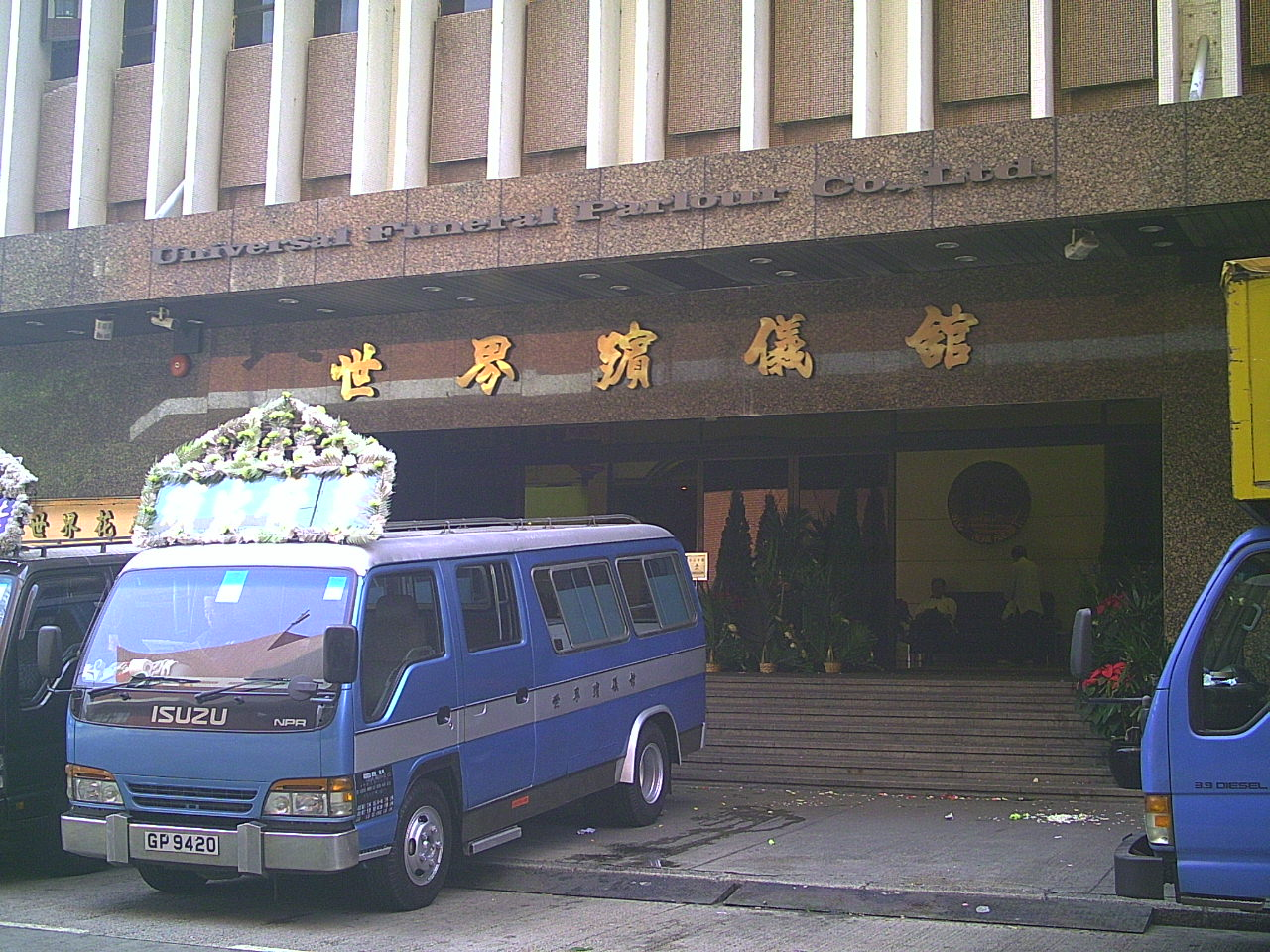
Typical Hong Kong hearse

In Hong Kong, light goods vehicles of Isuzu, Volkswagen and Ford are used as hearses by most of the privately operated funeral homes.

=== Singapore ===
In Singapore, most standard hearses are built on a commercial van chassis, such as the Toyota Hiace, the Nissan Urvan and the Mercedes-Benz Vito, while the traditional Chinese or Indian hearses are built on a lorry chassis such as the Mitsubishi Fuso Canter and the Isuzu Elf. There are also some limousine hearses in Singapore that are built on a luxury car chassis, such as Mercedes-Benz, Maserati and Jaguar.

== In popular culture ==
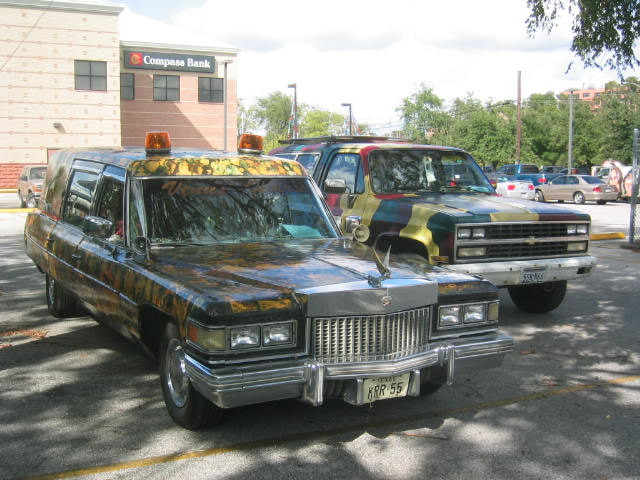
1975 Cadillac Miller-Meteor hearse

Amongst hearse enthusiasts, the 1959 Cadillac Miller-Meteor hearse is considered one of the most desirable, due to its especially ornate styling and appearances in several feature films, notably an ambulance version (Ecto-1) in the 1984 film Ghostbusters. In the 2016 Ghostbusters reboot, the Ecto-1 is a 1984 Cadillac Superior hearse.

The Rogues prowl around in a graffitied 1955 Cadillac Hearse in the film The Warriors.

Musician Neil Young's first car was a hearse, which he used to transport his early band's equipment.

Other celebrity hearse enthusiasts include three-time NASCAR Sprint Cup Champion Tony Stewart, who had his hearse customized for a television show. Sam the Sham of the Pharaohs (known for Wooly Bully and Lil' Red Riding Hood) was known for transporting all his equipment in a 1952 Packard hearse.

In April 2021, following the death of Prince Philip, Duke of Edinburgh, it was revealed that the prince had helped to design a custom-built military green, Land Rover Defender which was used to transport his coffin in his funeral procession at Windsor Castle.

== Other uses of the term ==
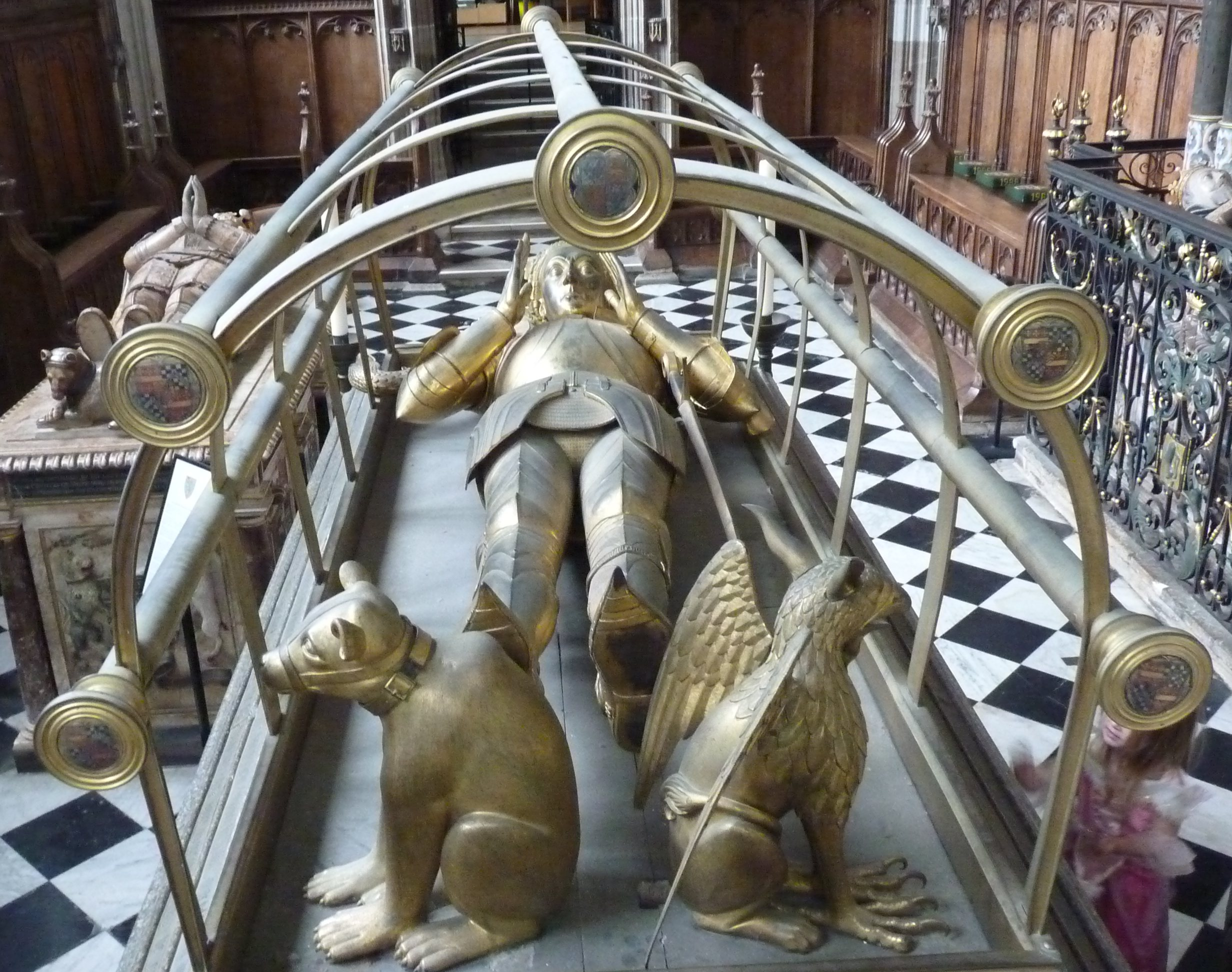
The Beauchamp effigy at Warwick, surmounted by a hearse for a pall covering

- In the traditional Holy Week services of the Roman Catholic Church and some Anglican churches, a candelabrum with 15 candles on it is used for the service of Tenebrae. The candelabrum is referred to as a "hearse".
- A structure that is sometimes placed above the coffin of a distinguished person at their funeral and subsequently above their tombs.

== See also ==
- Bier
- Car body style
- Combination car
- Commercial vehicle
- Flower car
- Minivan
- Panel van
- Sport utility vehicle
- Station wagon
- Van
