= Flower car =

Car for transporting funeral flowers

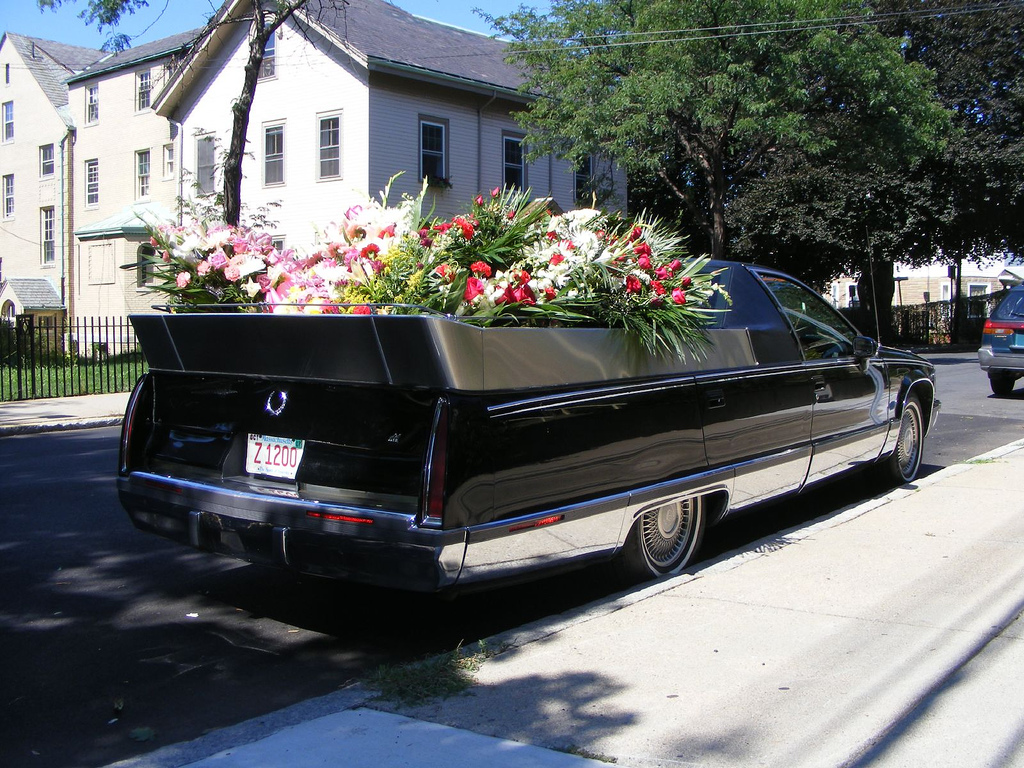
A mid-1990s Cadillac Fleetwood flower car

A flower car is a type of vehicle used in the funeral industry of the United States, frequently under the Cadillac brand. It is used to carry flowers for the burial service, or sometimes to carry the coffin under a bed of flowers. Built on the same commercial chassis as a hearse, the flower car has half-height rear bodywork on the rear similar to a pickup truck bed. The bed contains a liner to hold the flowers, normally built of stainless steel to resist rust. Some flower cars have a raised, flat tonneau cover across the bed at the top, upon which the flowers sit; the center portion sometimes is designed to raise and lower, hydraulically or by hand. If the flower car is designed to carry a casket, it will be stored under the tonneau cover in the space beneath, behind the opening rear gate.

In the early years of the automobile, open-topped luxury cars were used for this purpose, but as enclosed vehicles became the norm, specially built vehicles began to be used for this purpose from approximately the 1930s onward. Not every funeral provider owned a flower car; they were a luxury item offered as an extra-cost option for extravagant funerals. The quantities built were low; it is estimated that fewer than a dozen were built each year by each coachbuilder in the funeral market.

Flower cars are still manufactured, but in ever decreasing numbers. Old flower cars are considered collectible due to their rarity, especially by collectors of hearses and other "professional cars".

== See also ==
- Taiwanese Electric Flower Car
- Coupé utility
