= Station wagon =

Auto body style with its roof extended rearward

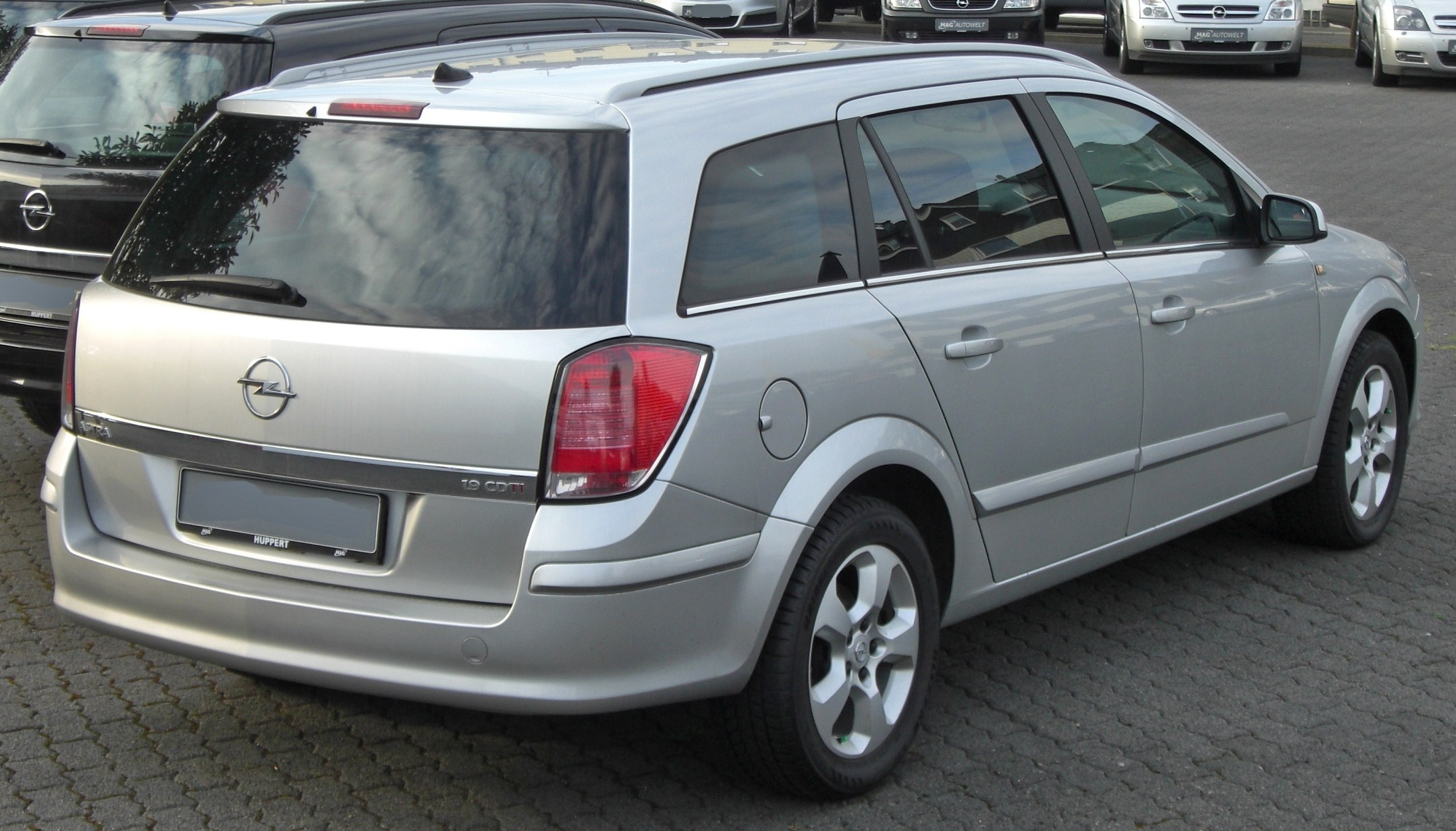
2005 Opel Astra H estate

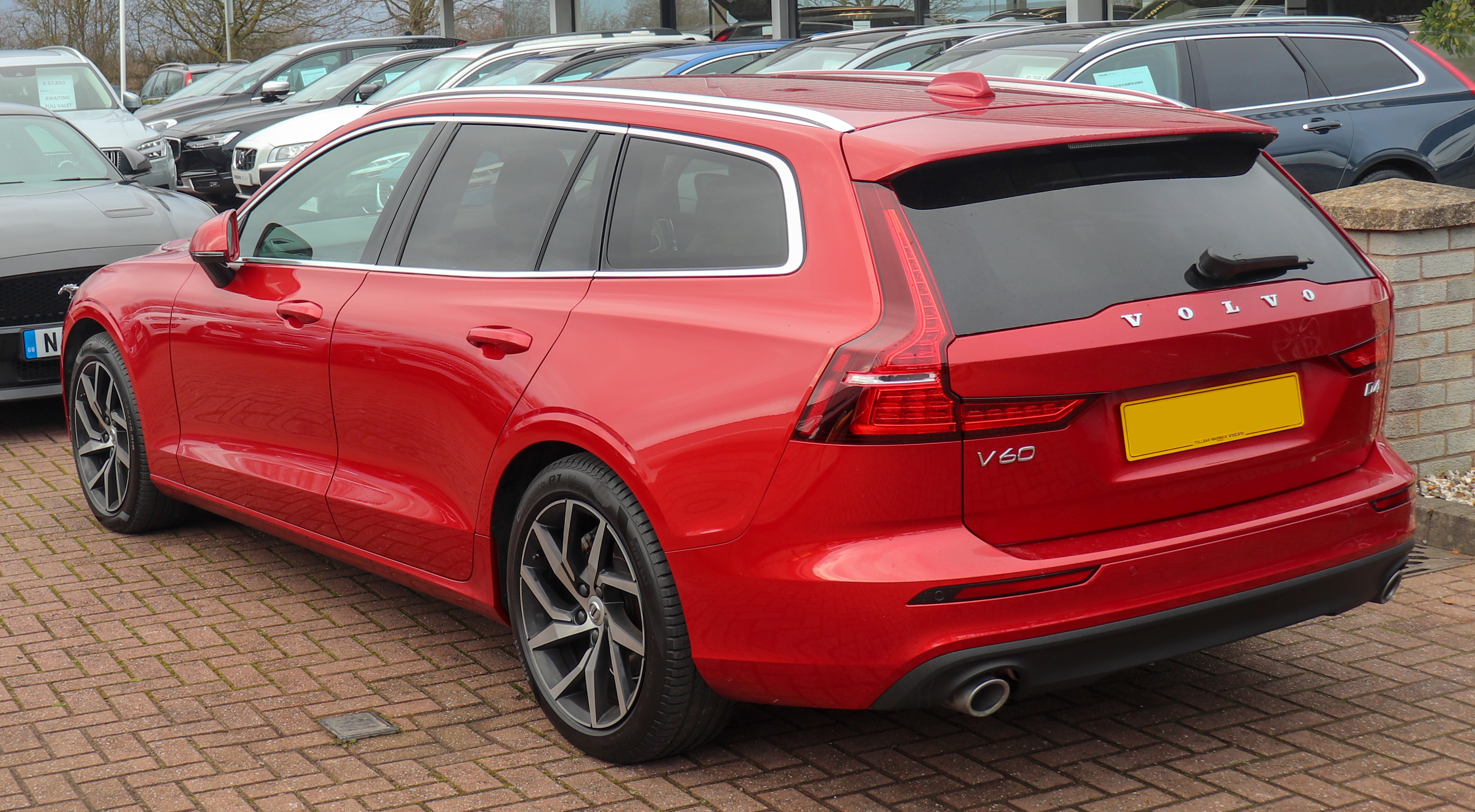
2018 Volvo V60 estate

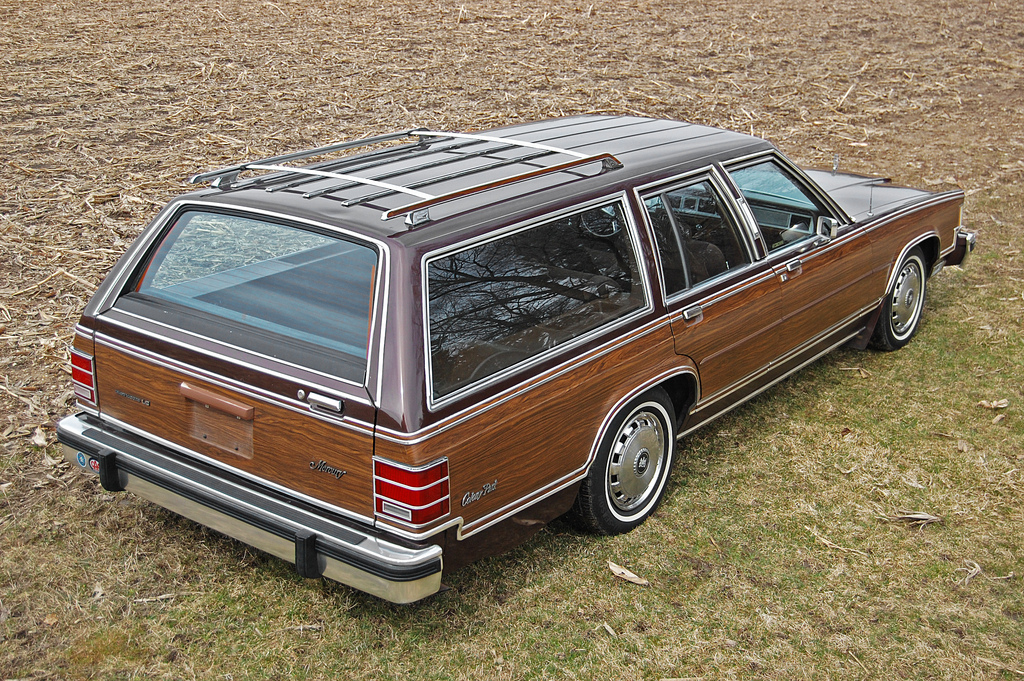
1984 Mercury Colony Park station wagon

A station wagon (US, also wagon) or estate car (UK, also estate) is an automotive body-style variant of a sedan with its roof extended rearward over a shared passenger/cargo volume with access at the back via a third or fifth door (the liftgate, or tailgate), instead of a trunk/boot lid. The body style transforms a standard three-box design into a two-box design, to include an A, B, and C-pillar, as well as a D-pillar. Station wagons can flexibly reconfigure their interior volume via fold-down rear seats to prioritize either passenger or cargo volume.

The American Heritage Dictionary defines a station wagon as "an automobile with one or more rows of folding or removable seats behind the driver and no luggage compartment but an area behind the seats into which suitcases, parcels, etc., can be loaded through a tailgate."

When a model range includes multiple body styles, such as sedan, hatchback, and station wagon, the models typically share their platform, drivetrain, and bodywork forward of the A-pillar, and usually the B-pillar. In 1969, Popular Mechanics said, "Station wagon-style ... follows that of the production sedan of which it is the counterpart. Most are on the same wheelbase, offer the same transmission and engine options, and the same comfort and convenience options."

Station wagons have evolved from their early use as specialized vehicles to carry people and luggage to and from a train station. The demand for station wagon body style has faded since the 2010s in favor of the crossover or SUV designs, especially in the United States and Canada.

== Name ==
Reflecting the original purpose of transporting people and luggage between country estates and railway stations, the station wagon body style is called an "estate car" or "estate" in the United Kingdom or a "wagon" in Australia and New Zealand.

Either horse-drawn or automotive, the earliest use of the station wagon description would be considered to describe utility vehicles or light trucks. The depot hackney or taxi, often on a Model T chassis with an exposed wood body, most often found around railroad stations, was the predecessor of the station wagon body style in the United States. These early models with exposed wooden bodies became known as woodies. By the 1920s the status of the station wagon description changed to consider them as vehicles for passengers.

In Germany, the term "kombi" is used. This is short for Kombinationskraftwagen ("combination motor vehicle"). "Kombi" is also the term used in Poland.

In Russia and some post-Soviet countries, this type of car is called "universal".

Manufacturers may designate station wagons across various model lines with a proprietary nameplate for marketing and advertising differentiation. Examples include "Avant", "Break", "Caravan", "Kombi", "Sports Tourer", "Sports Wagon", "Tourer", "Touring", and "Variant".

== Design characteristics ==
=== Comparison with hatchbacks ===
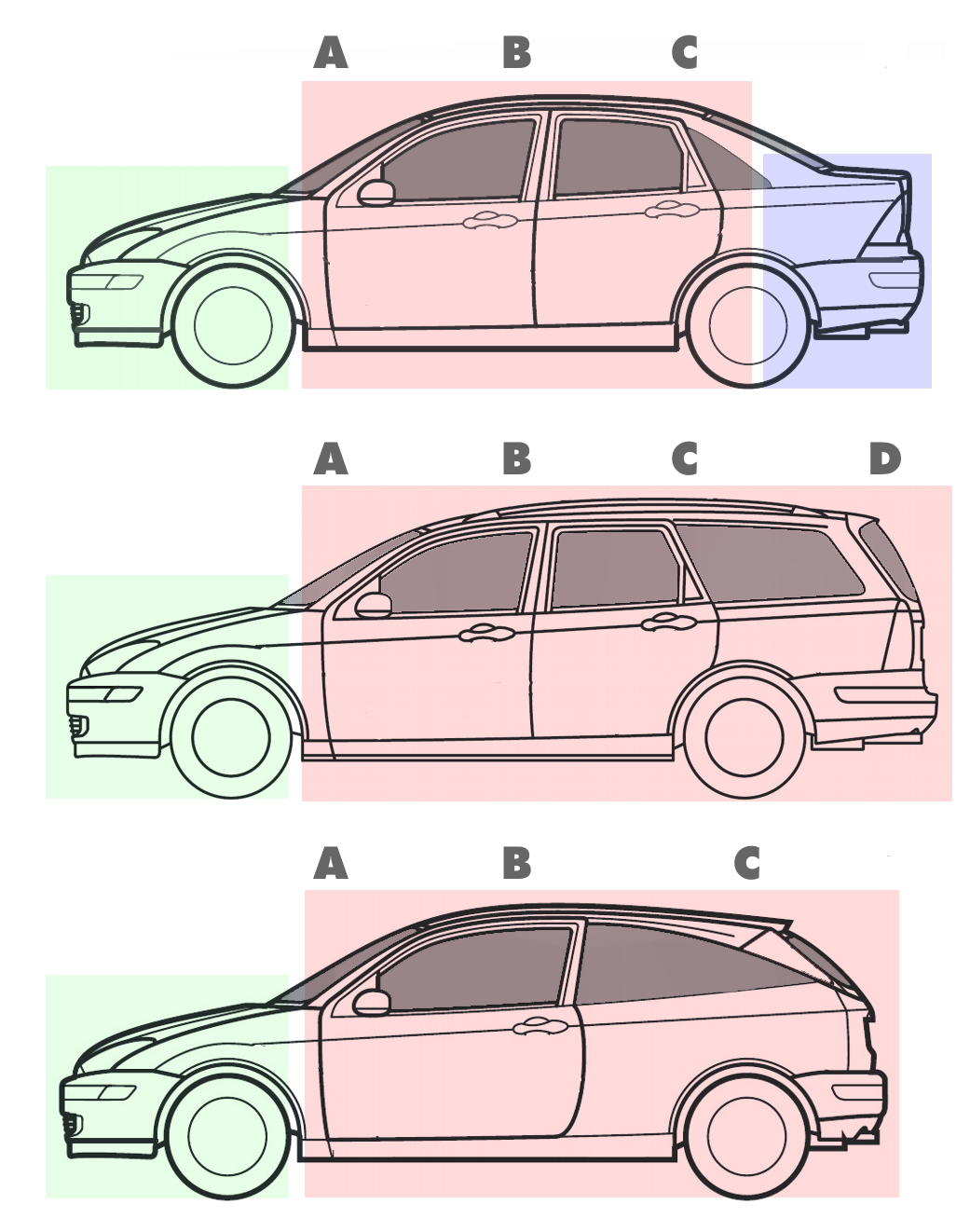
Typical pillar configurations of a sedan (three box), station wagon (two box) and hatchback (two box) from the same model range

Station wagons and hatchbacks have in common a two-box design configuration, a shared interior volume for passengers and cargo as well as a hatch or rear door (often called a tailgate in the case of a station wagon) that is hinged at roof level. Folding rear seats designed to provide a larger space for cargo in place of passenger capacity, are also typical features for station wagons and hatchbacks.

Distinguishing features between hatchbacks and station wagons include:

- D-pillar: Station wagons are more likely to have a D-pillar (hatchbacks and station wagons both have A-, B-, and C-pillars).
- Cargo volume: Station wagons prioritize passenger and cargo volume with windows beside the cargo volume. Of the two body styles, a station wagon roof (viewed in profile) more likely extends to the very rearmost of the vehicle, enclosing a full-height cargo volume;a hatchback design (especially a liftback version) is likely to have steeply sloping roofline behind the B- or C-Pillar, prioritizing style over interior volume or cargo capacity, sometimes having a shorter rear overhang and smaller side windows (or no windows at all).

Other differences are more variable and can potentially include:

- Cargo floor contour: A station wagon often has a fold-flat floor (for increased cargo capacity), whereas a hatchback is more likely to have a cargo floor with a pronounced contour.
- Seating: Some station wagons have three rows of seats, whereas a hatchback will have two at most. The rearmost row of seating in a station wagon is often located in the cargo area and can be front-facing, rear-facing, or side-facing.
- Rear suspension: A station wagon may include a reconfigured rear suspension for additional load capacity and to minimize intrusion in the cargo volume.
- Rear Door: Hatchbacks usually feature a top-hinged liftgate for cargo access, with variations ranging from a two-part liftgate to a complex tailgate that can function as a full tailgate or a trunk lid. Station wagons have also been equipped with numerous tailgate configurations. Hatchbacks may be called Liftbacks when the opening area is very sloped, and the door is lifted to open. A design director from General Motors has described the difference as "Where you break the roofline, at what angle, defines the spirit of the vehicle", he said. "You could have a 90-degree break in the back and have a station wagon."

It has become common for station wagons to use a platform shared with other body styles, resulting in many shared components (such as chassis, engine, transmission, bodywork forward of the A-pillar, interior features, and optional features) being used for the wagon, sedan, and hatchback variants of the model range.

=== Tailgate designs ===
Many modern station wagons have an upward-swinging, full-width, full-height rear door supported on gas springs, often where the rear window can swing up independently. A variety of other designs have been employed in the past.

==== Split gate ====
The split gate features an upward-swinging window and a downward-swinging tailgate, both manually operated. This configuration was typical in the 1920s through the 1940s, and remained common on many models into the 1960s.

==== Retractable window ====
In the early 1950s, tailgates with hand-cranked roll-down rear windows began to appear. Later in the decade, electric power was applied to the tailgate window so it could be operated from the driver's seat and by a key-activated switch in the tailgate. By the early 1970s, this arrangement was available on full-size, intermediate, and compact wagons. The lowered bottom hinged tailgate extended the cargo area floor and could serve as a picnic table for "tailgating".

- Side hinge: A side-hinged tailgate that opened like a door was offered on some three-seat station wagons to facilitate the back-row passengers to enter and exit the rear-facing seats.

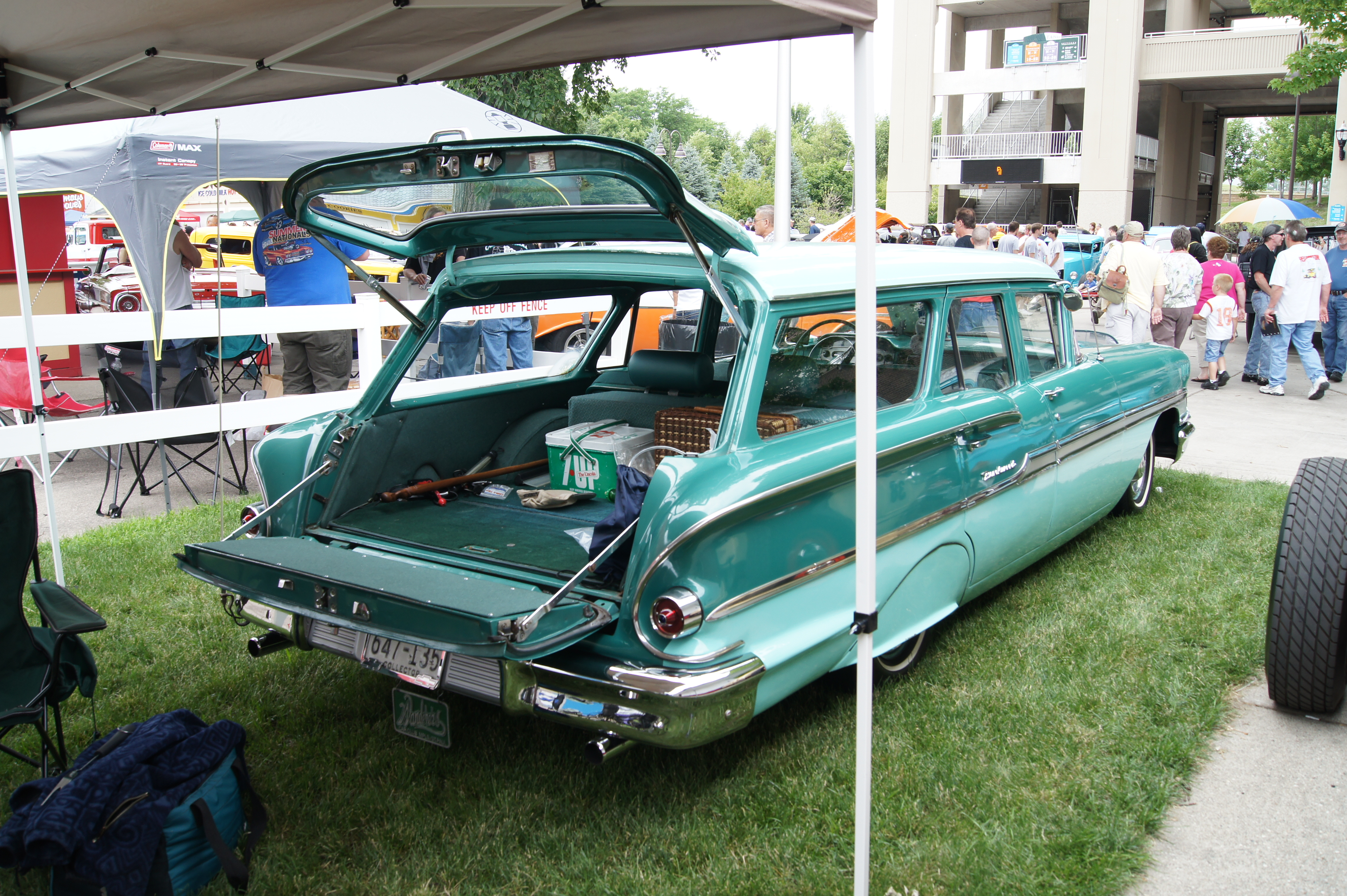
Split tailgate

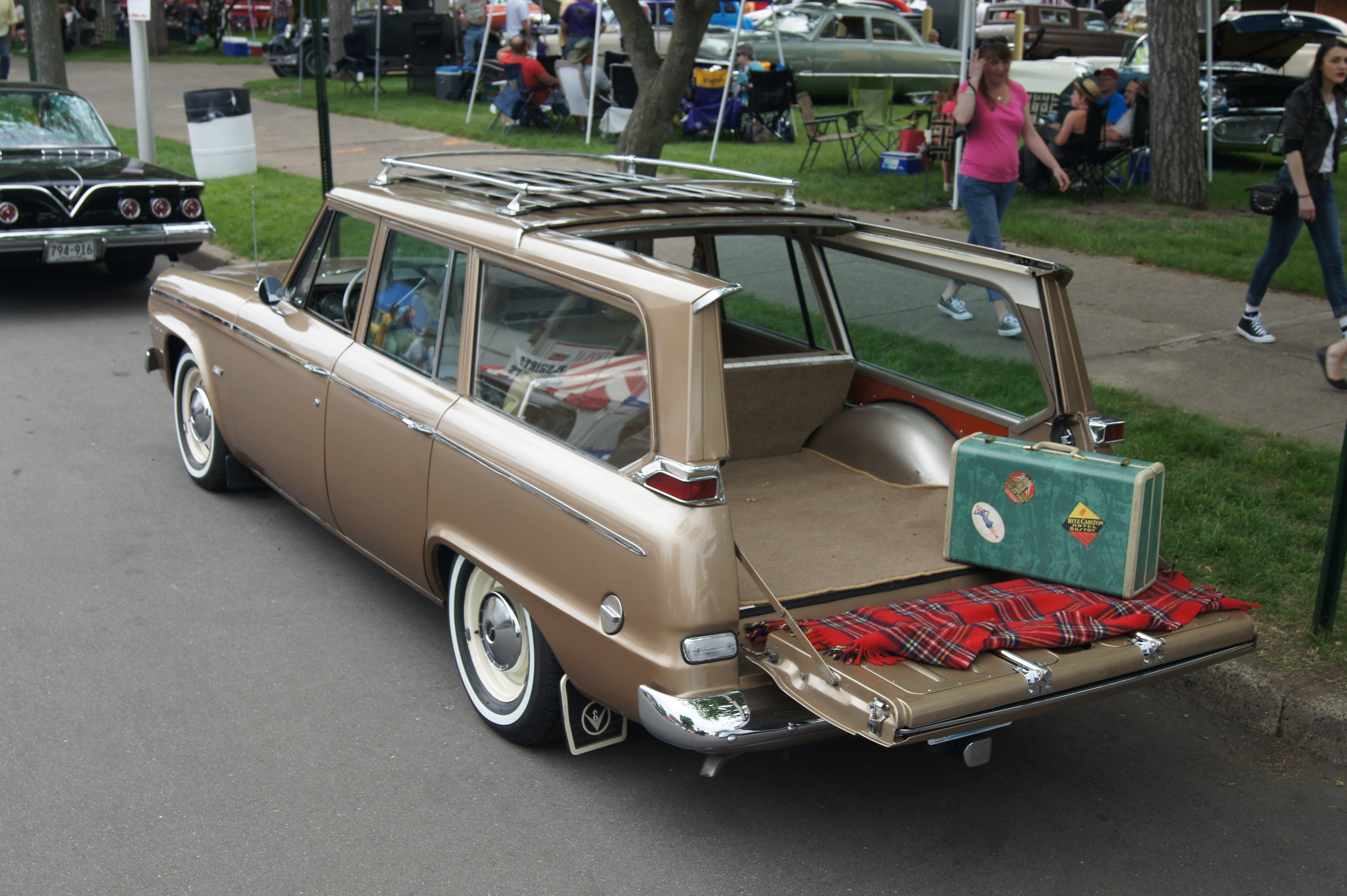
Rear roof retracted and tailgate hinged down

==== Retractable roof ====
A station wagon design featuring a retractable rear roof section and a conventional rear tailgate with a window that rolled down and the gate opened down. The sliding roof section allowed the carrying of tall objects in the rear cargo area. This configuration appeared on the 1963–1966 Studebaker Wagonaire station wagon and the 1998–2009 GMC Envoy XUV SUV model.

==== Dual and tri-operating gates ====
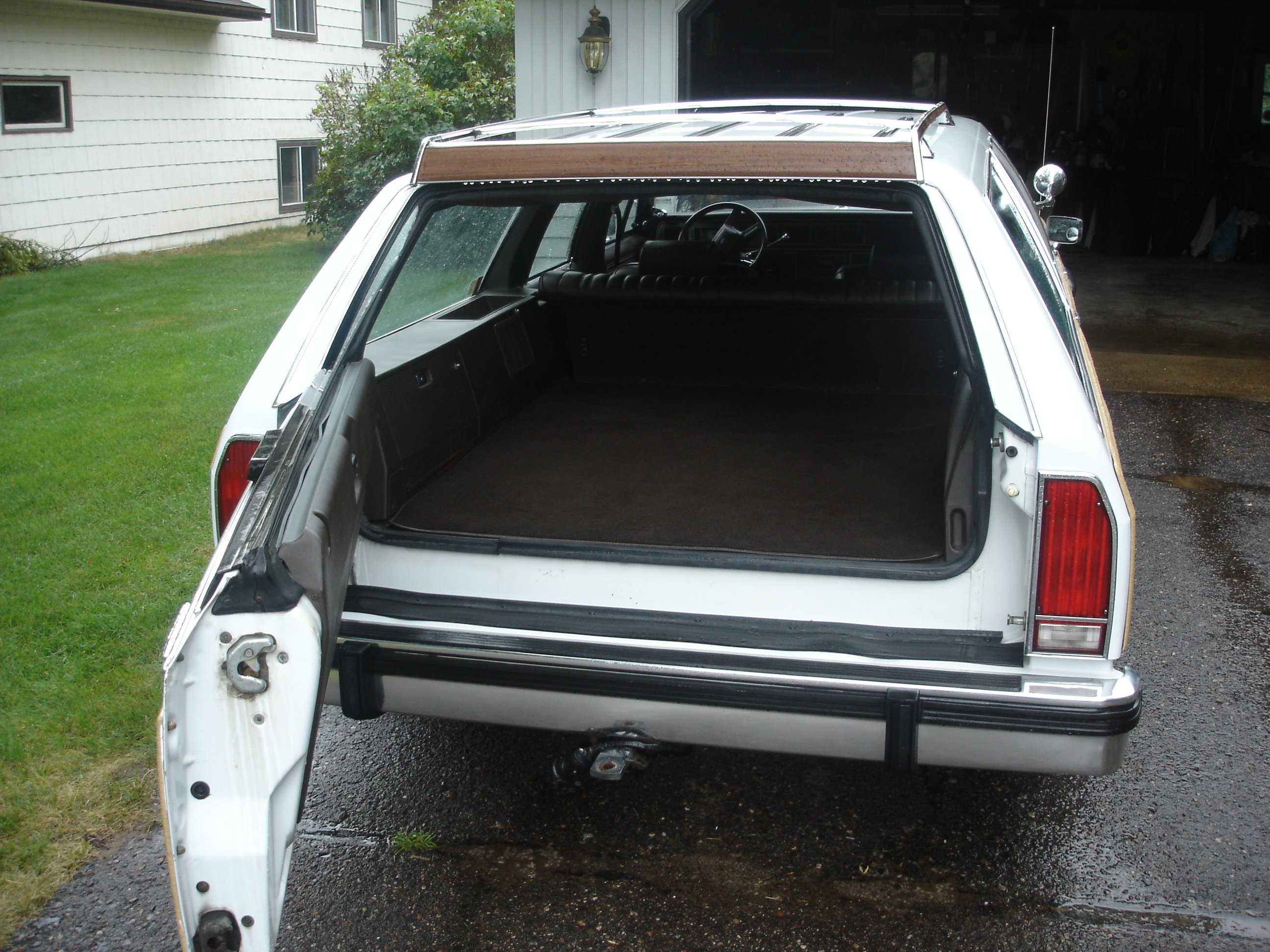
Side-hinged tailgate

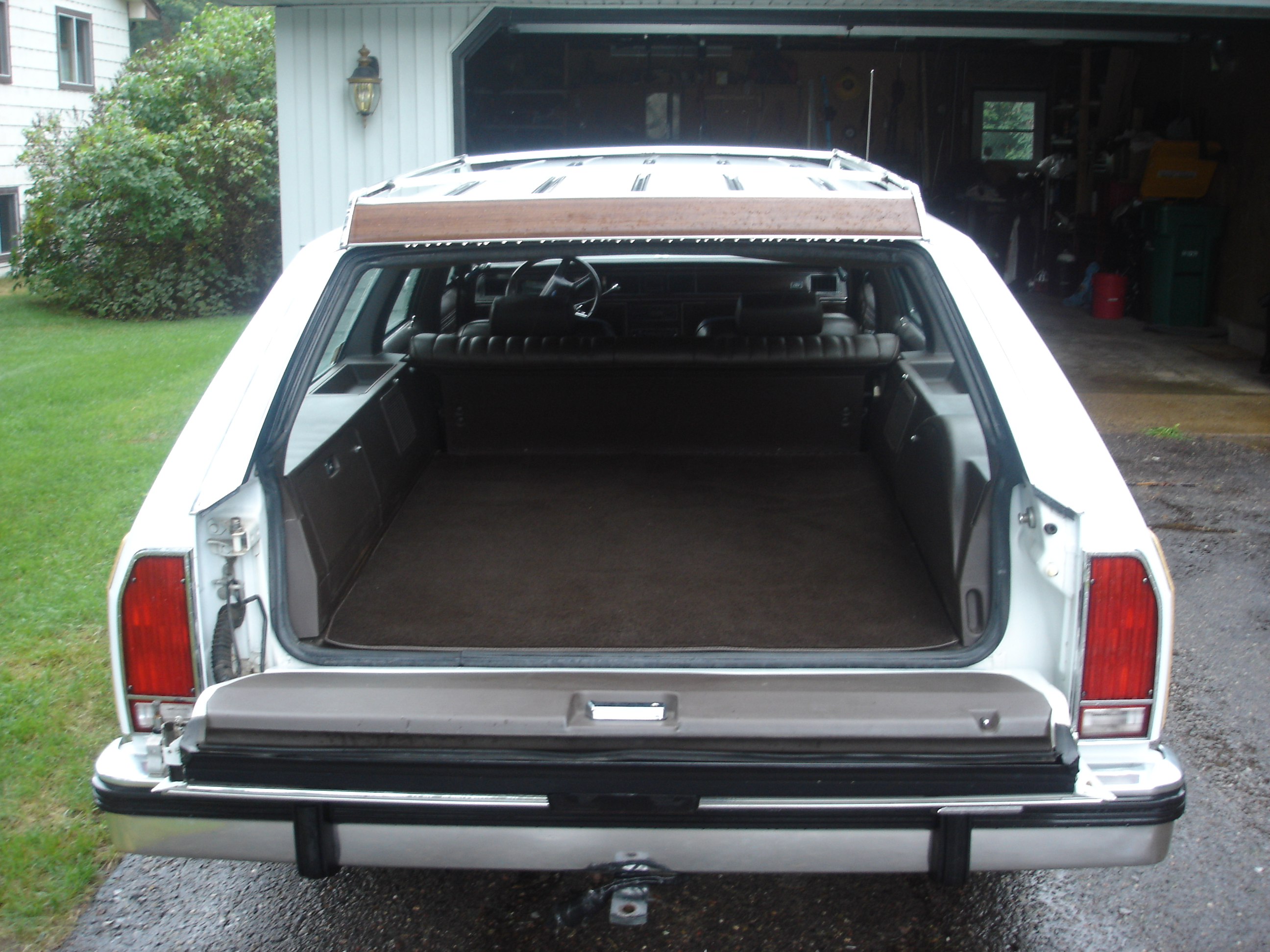
Tailgate folded down

A dual tailgate on a Ford Country Squire

In the United States, Ford's full-size station wagons for 1966 introduced a system marketed as "Magic Doorgate": a conventional tailgate with retracting rear glass, where the tailgate could either fold down or pivot open on a side hinge; with the rear window retracted in either case. Competitors marketed their versions as a Drop and Swing or Dual Action Tailgate. For 1969, Ford incorporated a design that allowed the rear glass to remain up or down when the door pivoted open on its side hinge, marketing the system, engineered by Donald N. Frey as the "Three-Way Magic Doorgate".

Similar configurations became the standard feature on full-size and intermediate station wagons from General Motors, Ford, Chrysler, and American Motors Corporation (AMC). Some full-size GM wagons added a notch in the rear bumper that acted as a step plate; a small portion of the bumper was attached to the tailgate to fill the gap. When opened as a swinging door, this part of the bumper moved away, allowing the depression in the bumper to provide a "step" to ease entry; when the gate was opened by being lowered or raised to a closed position, the chrome section remained in place making the bumper "whole".

==== Clamshell ====
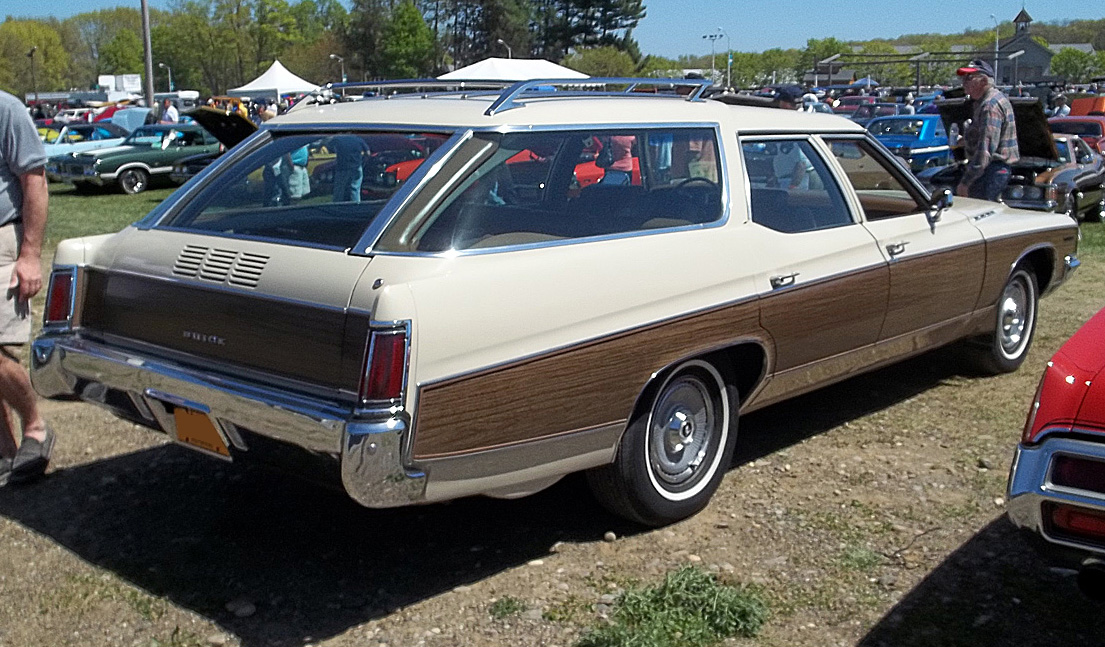
Closed tailgate

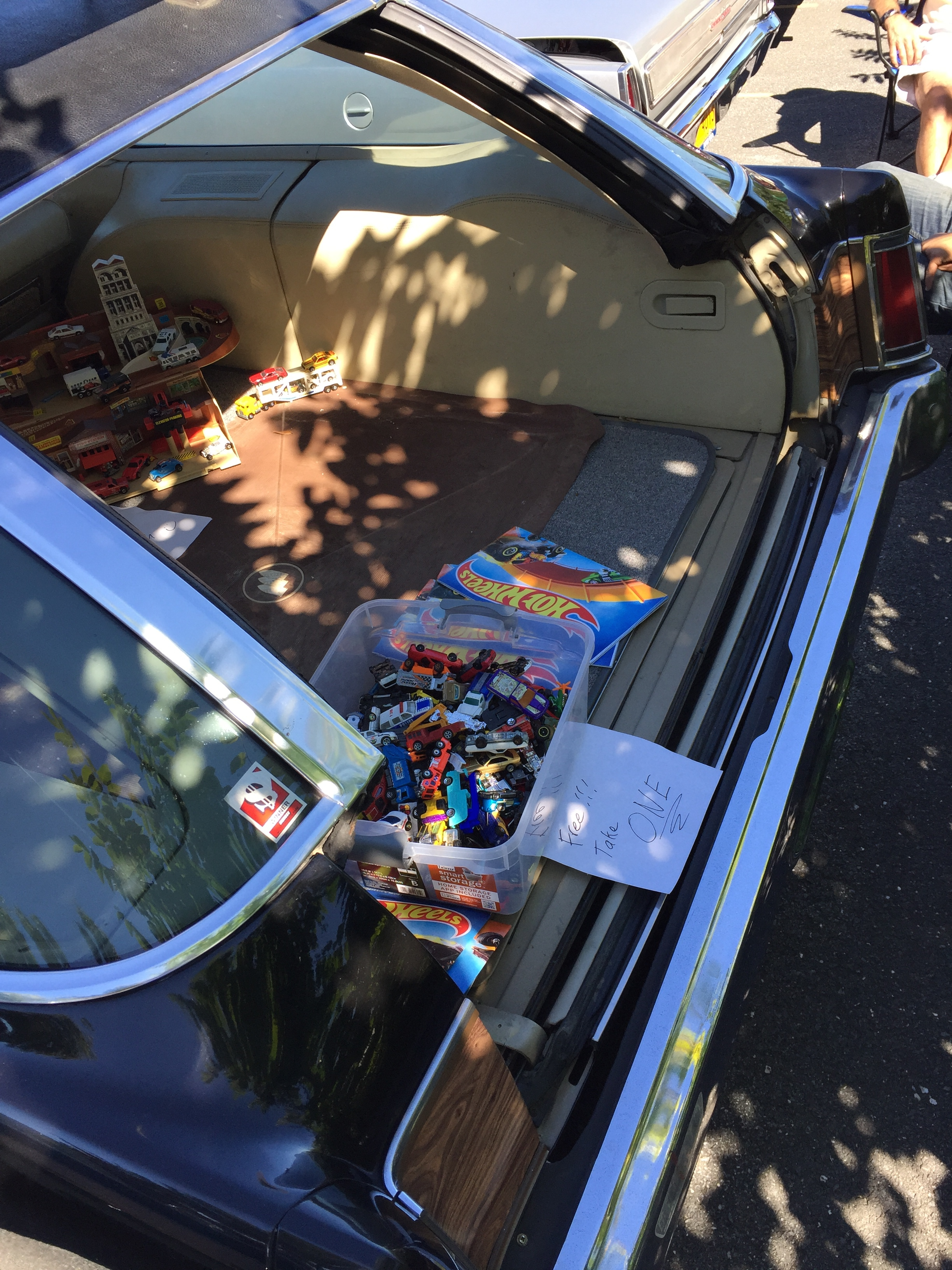
Tailgate folded open

1971 Buick Estate Wagon with a "clam shell" tailgate

Full-size General Motors, from 1971 through 1976 station wagons (Chevrolet Kingswood, Townsman, Brookwood, Bel Air, Impala, and Caprice Estates; Pontiac Safari and Grand Safari; Oldsmobile Custom Cruiser, and the Buick Estate models) featured a 'clam shell' design marketed as the Glide-away tailgate, also called a "disappearing" tailgate because when open, the tailgate was entirely out of view. On the clamshell design, the rear power-operated glass slid up into the roof and the lower tailgate (with either manual or optional power operation), lowered below the load floor. Manually operated types included a lower tailgate counterbalanced by a torque rod similar to the torque rods used in holding a trunk lid open. It required a 35-pound (16 kg) push to lower the gate. Raising it required a 35-pound (16 kg) pull on a handhold integral to the top edge of the retractable gate. Power-assisted operation of both the upper glass and lower tailgate became standard equipment in later model years. Station wagons with this design were available with an optional third row of forward-facing seats accessed by the rear side doors and a folding second-row seat. They could accommodate 4-by-8-foot (1.2 m × 2.4 m) sheets of plywood or other panels with the rear seats folded. The clamshell design required no increased footprint or operational area to open the cargo area. This enabled access even if the station wagon's rear was parked against a wall.

The GM design, as used in a Pontiac Grand Safari, with a forward-facing third-row seat and the clamshell tailgate, was less popular with consumers and was described as the "least convenient of all wagon arrangements" with difficult passenger egress and problematic tailgate operation in comparison to the 1974 AMC Ambassador, Dodge Monaco, and Mercury Colony Park, full-size station wagons conducted by Popular Science magazine. Subsequent GM full-size wagons reverted to the door/gate system for its full-size wagons.

==== Lift-gate ====
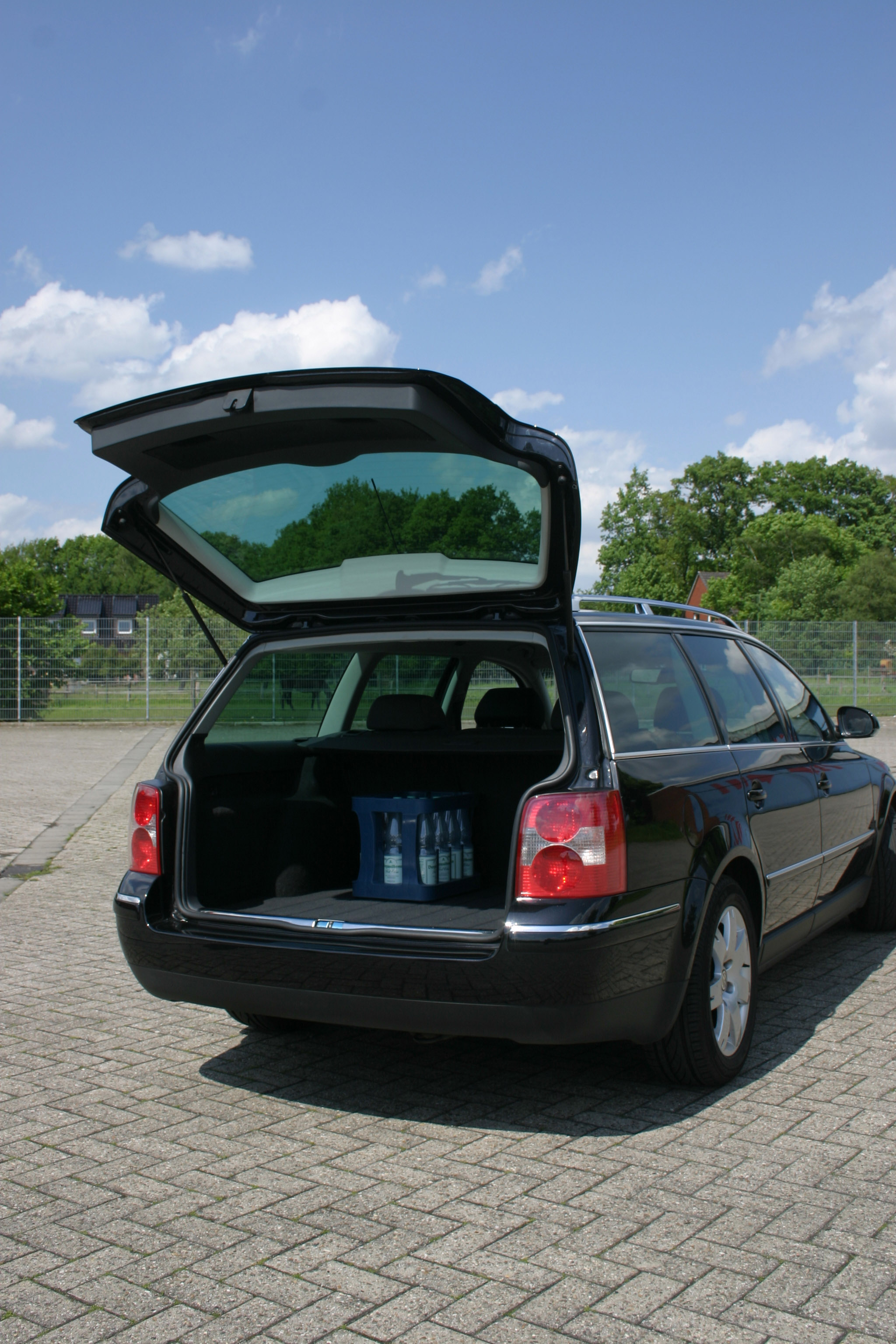
A lift-gate on a Volkswagen Passat Variant

A simplified, one-piece lift-gate on smaller wagons. The AMC Hornet Sportabout was introduced for the 1972 model year and featured a "liftgate-style hatchback instead of swing-out or fold-down tailgate ... would set a precedent for liftgates in modern SUVs." The 1978–1996 GM's mid-size station wagons also returned to the upward-lifting rear window/gate as had been used in the 1940s.

- Swing-up window: An upward-lifting, full-height, full-width rear door, where the window on the rear door can be opened independently from the rear door itself. The window is also opened upwards and is held on pneumatic struts. The Renault Laguna II station wagon and Ford Taurus wagon featured this arrangement.
- Fold-up license plate: Wagons (including the Volvo Amazon wagon, early models of the Range Rover, and the Subaru Baja) had an upward folding hinged license plate attached to the lower tailgate of the split rear door. When the tailgate was folded down, the plate hung down and remained readable. The wagon versions of the Citroën DS, called the Break, Familiale, or Safari, had a different solution: two number plates were fitted to the tailgate at right angles to each other so one would be visible in either position.

=== Safety equipment ===
Cargo barriers may be used to prevent unsecured cargo from causing injuries in the event of sudden deceleration, collision, or a rollover.

=== Performance models ===
Performance models of station wagons have included the 1970 Ford Falcon (XY) 'Grand Sport' pack, the 1973 Chevrolet Chevelle Malibu SS-454 and the 1992 BMW M5 (E34).

The 1994 Audi RS2, developed with Porsche, has been described as the world's first performance station wagon. This was followed by the Audi RS4 and Audi RS6.

The 2006 through 2008 Dodge Magnum SRT8 model brought power and performance with station wagon features. The cars featured a 6.1 L Hemi V8 engine rated at 425 hp (317 kW; 431 PS). The Dodge Magnum SRT8 shared its platform with the Chrysler 300C Touring SRT8, which was only sold in Europe.

Other German manufacturers have produced station wagon versions of their performance models, such as the Mercedes-AMG C63, Mercedes-AMG E63, BMW M5 (E60/E61), Volkswagen Golf R and Volkswagen Passat R36 wagons.

The Cadillac CTS-V Wagon introduced for the 2011 model year was considered the most potent production station wagon offered with a manual transmission, and the Corvette-engined version continued until 2014.

== History by country ==
=== United States ===
==== 1910 to 1940: Origins and woodie wagons ====
The first station wagons were built in around 1910 by independent manufacturers producing wooden custom bodies for the Ford Model T chassis. They were initially called "depot hacks" because they worked around train depots as hacks (short for hackney carriage, as taxicabs were then known). They also came to be known as "carryalls" and "suburbans". Station wagons were initially considered commercial vehicles (rather than consumer automobiles) and the framing of the early station wagons was left unfinished, due to the commercial nature of the vehicles. Early station wagons were fixed-roof vehicles, but lacked the sides and glass that would generally enclose the passenger compartment, and included rudimentary benches for seating passengers. Instead of framed glass, side curtains of canvas could be unrolled. More rigid curtains could be snapped to protect passengers from outside elements. The roofs of "woodie" wagons were usually made of stretched canvas treated with a waterproofing dressing. The framing of the wooden bodies was partially sheathed in steel and coated with tinted lacquer for protection. These wooden bodies required constant maintenance: varnishes required re-coating, and expansion/contraction of the wood meant that bolts and screws needed periodic re-tightening.

Manufacture of the wooden bodies was initially outsourced to custom coachbuilders because production of the all-wood bodies was very time-consuming. One of the first builders of wagon bodies was the Stoughton Wagon Company in Stoughton, Wisconsin, which began putting custom wagon bodies on the Ford Model T chassis in 1919. In 1922, the Essex Closed Coach, a sedan, became the first mass-produced car to use a steel body. In 1923, Star (a division of Durant Motors) became the first car company to offer a station wagon assembled on its production line (using a wooden wagon body shipped in from an outside supplier). Ford owned its own hardwood forest and mills (at the Ford Iron Mountain Plant in what is today Kingsford, Michigan, in Michigan's Upper Peninsula) and in 1929 became the first "Big Three" automaker in the United States to sell a factory-built station wagon. The Model A wagon featured two rows of removable seating in the back and the body was made of maple, birch, and basswood. Also in 1929, J.T. Cantrell began supplying woodie bodies for Chrysler vehicles, which continued until 1931. These early models were utility vehicles also known as depot hacks, and were not targeted as "family-friendly" automobiles.

By the 1930s, station wagons had become expensive and well-equipped vehicles. When it was introduced in 1941, the Chrysler Town & Country was one of the most expensive cars in the company's model range. The first all-steel station wagon body style was the 1935 Chevrolet Suburban. As part of the overall trend in the automotive industry, wooden bodies were superseded by all-steel bodies due to their strength, cost, and durability. The commercial vehicle status was also reflected on those vehicles' registrations For example, special "Suburban" license plates in Pennsylvania were used well into the 1960s, long after station wagons became car-based.

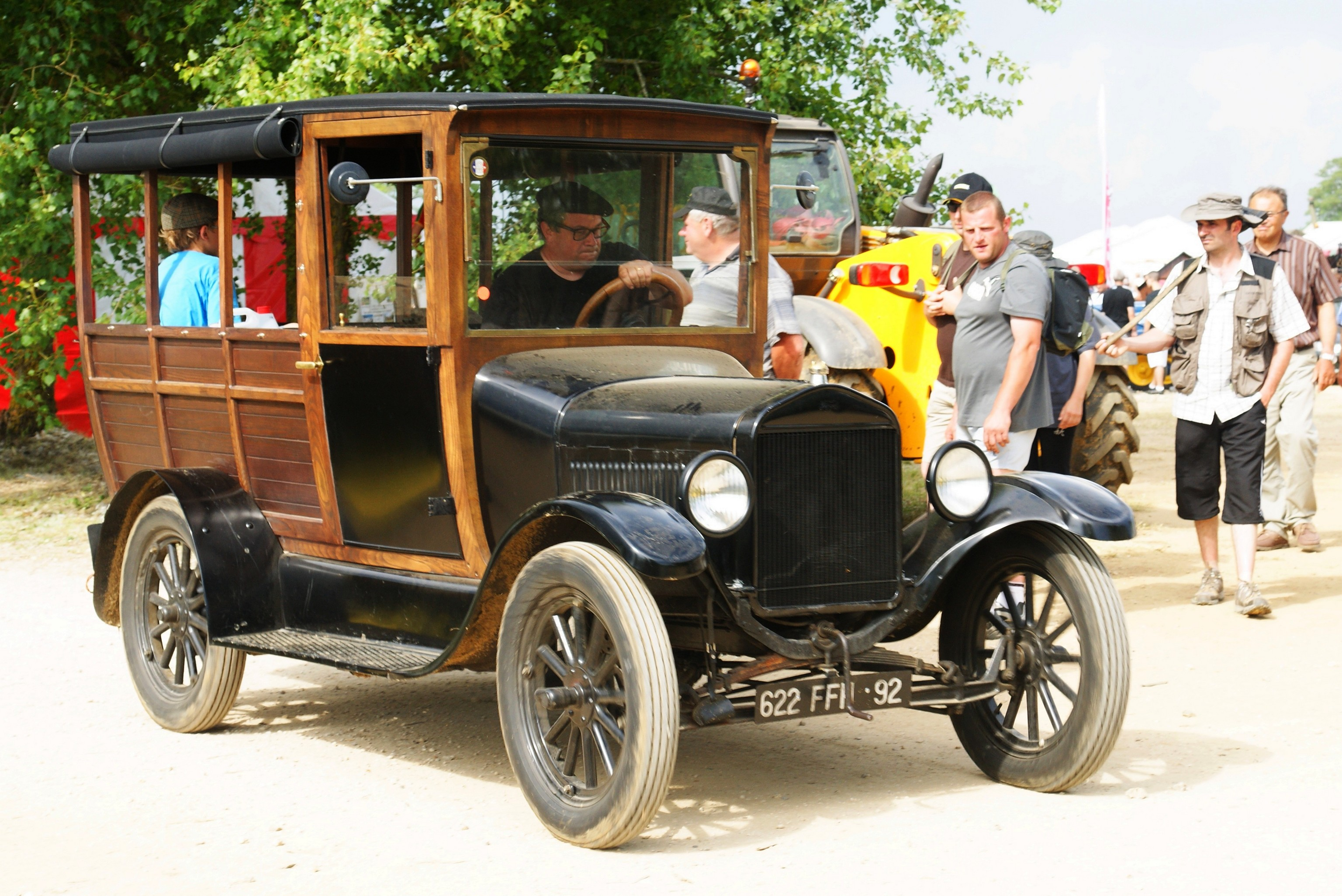
Ford Model T

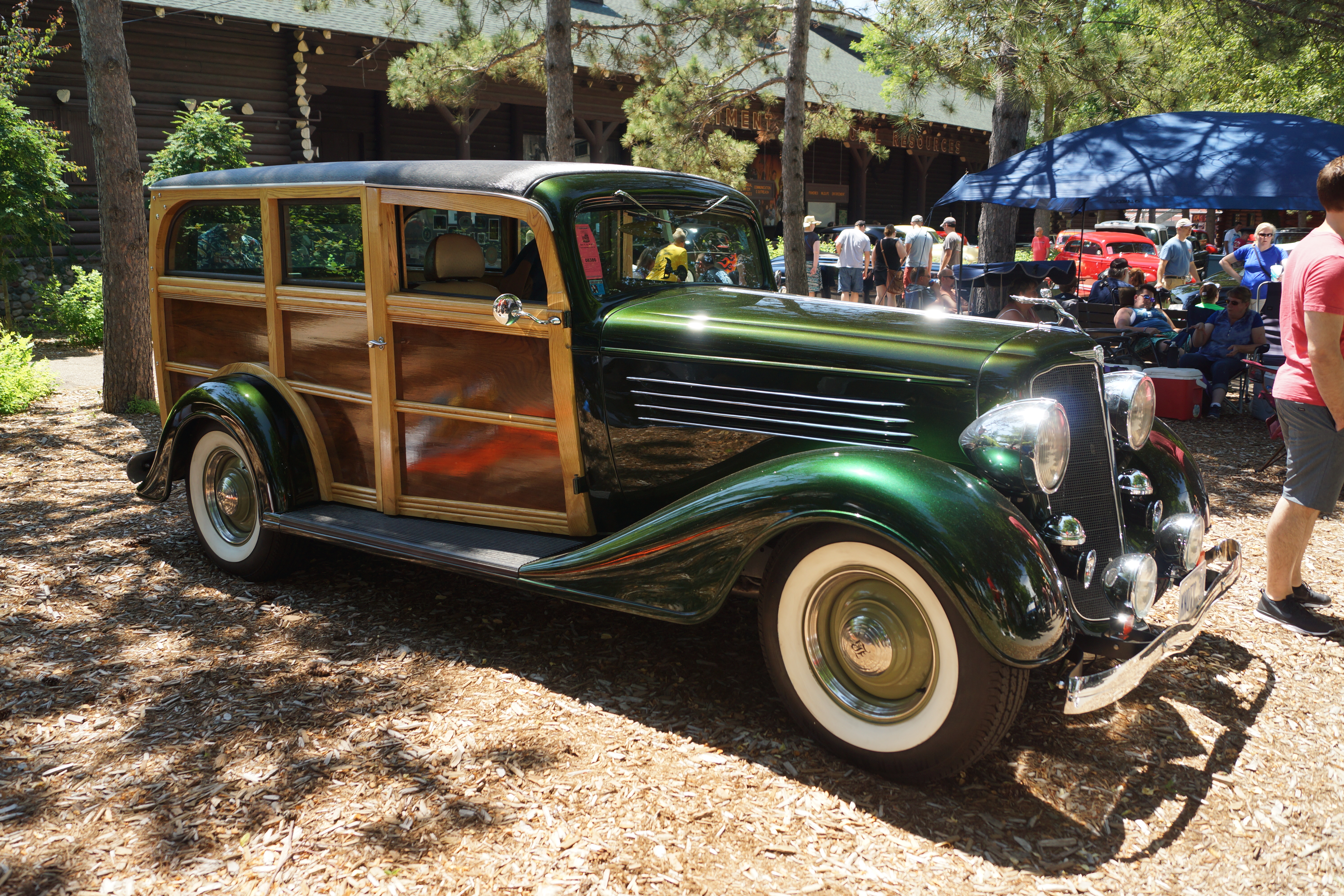
1934 Buick Series 50 station wagon

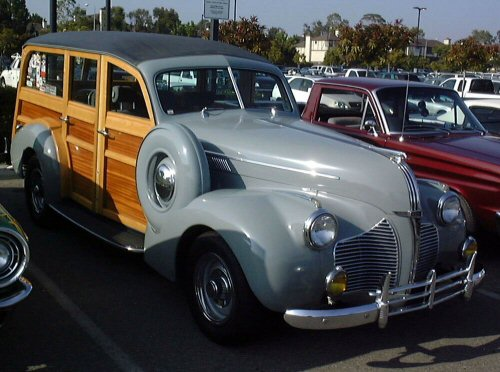
1940 Pontiac Special Series 25

==== 1945 to 1970: Steel-bodied station wagons ====
The first all-steel station wagon was the 1935 Chevrolet Suburban, which was built on the chassis of a panel truck. However, most station wagons were produced with wooden bodies until after World War II.

When automobile production resumed after World War II, technological advances made all-steel station wagon bodies more practical, eliminating the cost, noise, and maintenance associated with wood bodies. The first mass-produced steel-bodied station wagon was the 1946 Willys Station Wagon, based on the chassis of the Jeep CJ-2A. In 1947, Crosley introduced a steel-bodied station wagon version of the Crosley CC Four.

The first postwar station wagon to be based on a passenger car chassis was the 1949 Plymouth Suburban, which used a two-door body style. Families were growing and suburbs expanding, making the Plymouth wagon attractive to parents. Several manufacturers produced steel and wooden-bodied station wagons concurrently for several years. For example, Plymouth continued the production of wooden-bodied station wagons until 1950. The final wooden-bodied station built in the United States was the 1953 Buick Super Estate.

By 1951, most station wagons were being produced with all-steel bodies. Station wagons experienced the highest production levels in the United States from the 1950s through the 1970s due to the American mid-20th century baby boom.

The late 1950s through the mid-1960s was also the period of significant variation in body styles, with models available without a B-pillar (called hardtop or pillarless models) or with a B-pillar, both in two-door and four-door variants.

The 1956 Rambler was an all-new design, and the four-door "Cross Country" featured the industry's first station wagon hardtop. However, the pillarless models could be expensive to produce, added wind noise, and created structural issues with body torque. GM eliminated the pillarless wagon from its lineup in 1959, while AMC and Ford exited the field beginning with their 1960 and 1961 vehicles, leaving Chrysler and Dodge with the body style through the 1964 model year.

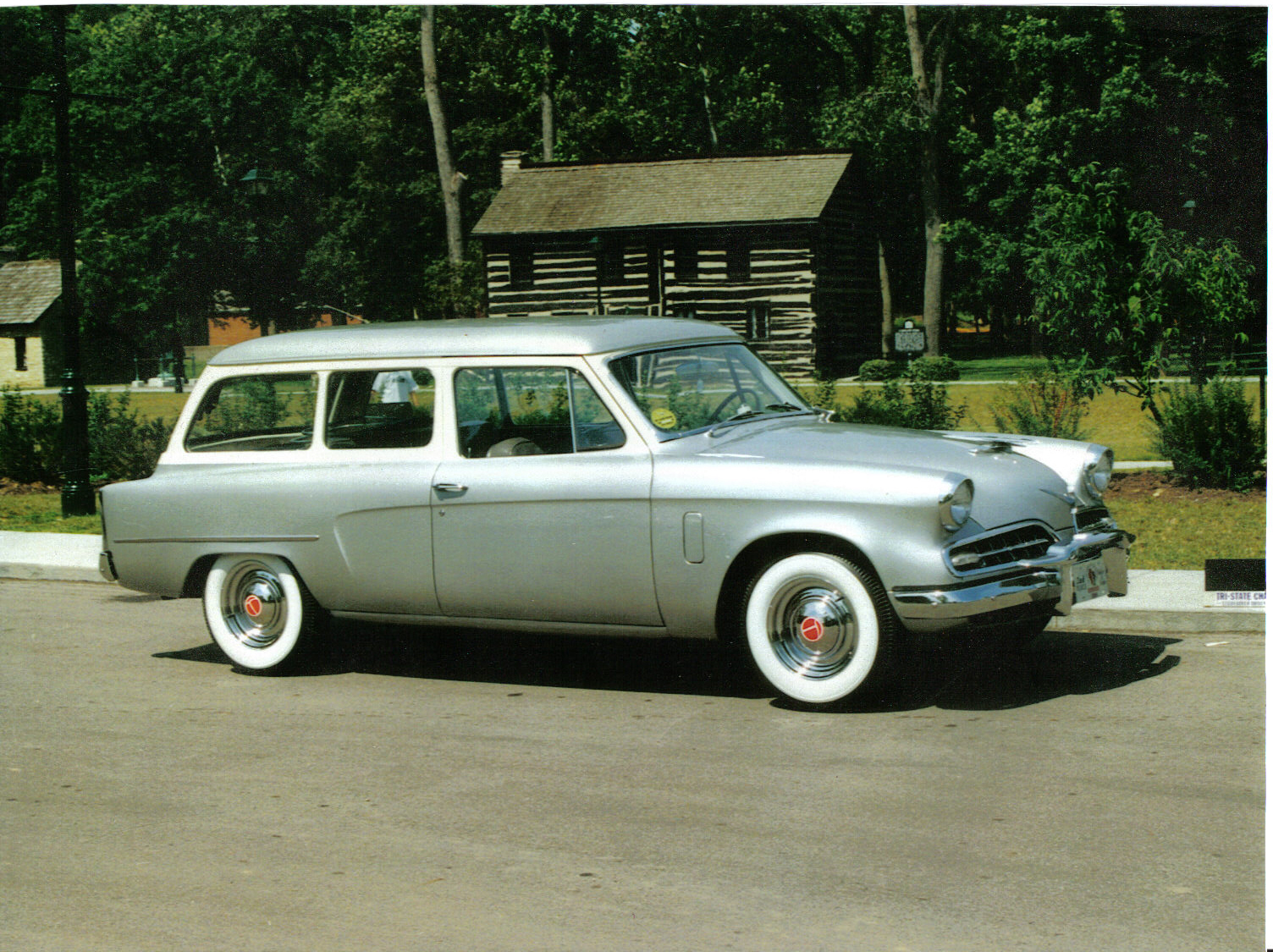
1954 Studebaker Conestoga

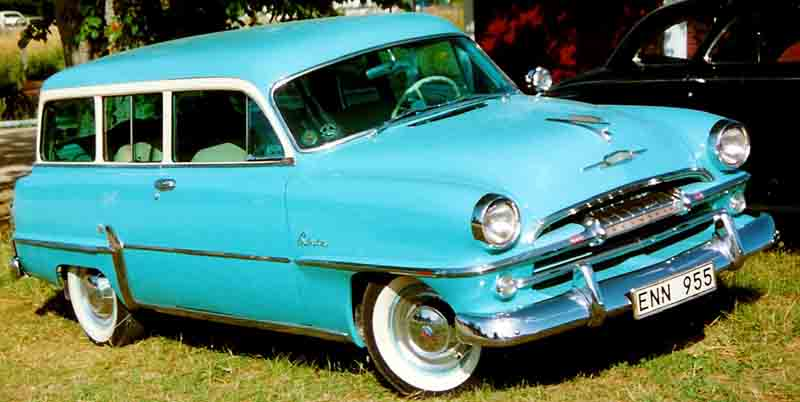
1954 Plymouth Savoy Station Wagon

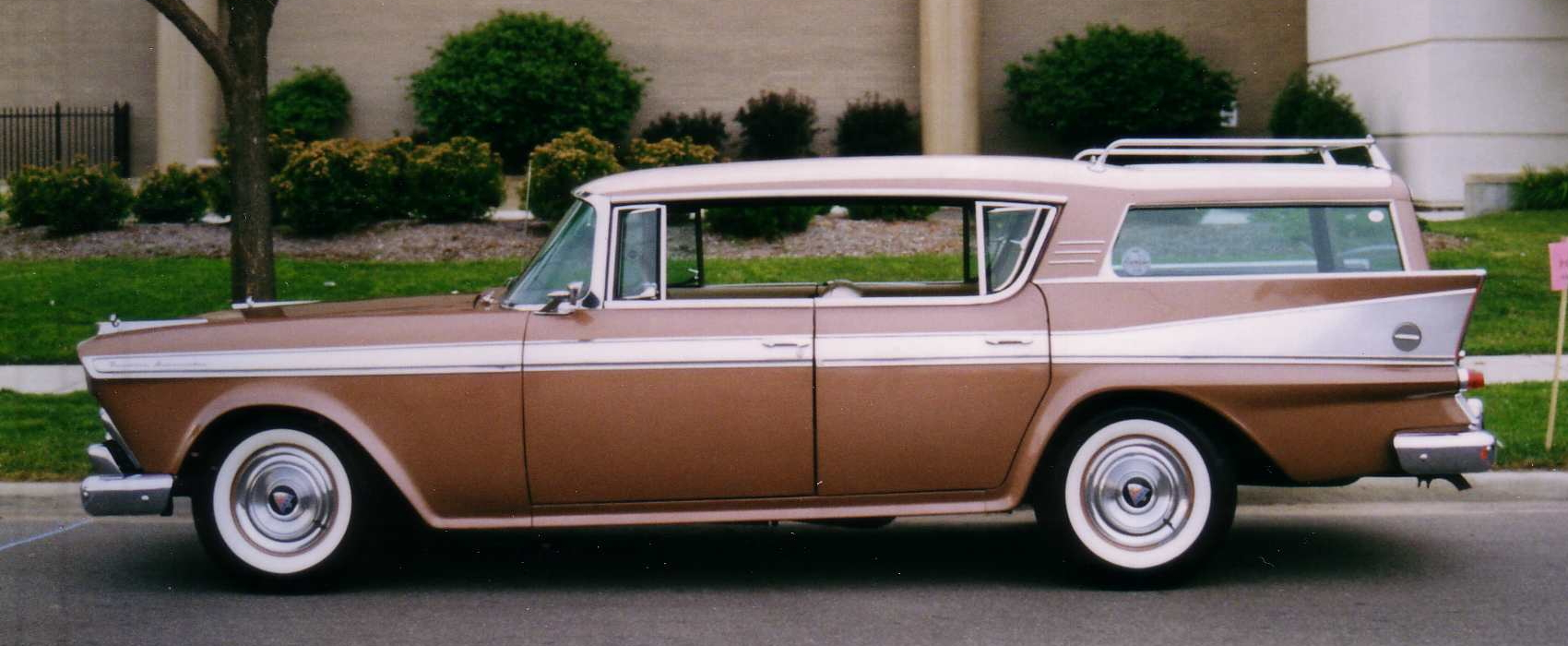
1958 AMC Ambassador four-door pillarless hardtop station wagon

==== 1970 to 1990: Competition from minivans ====
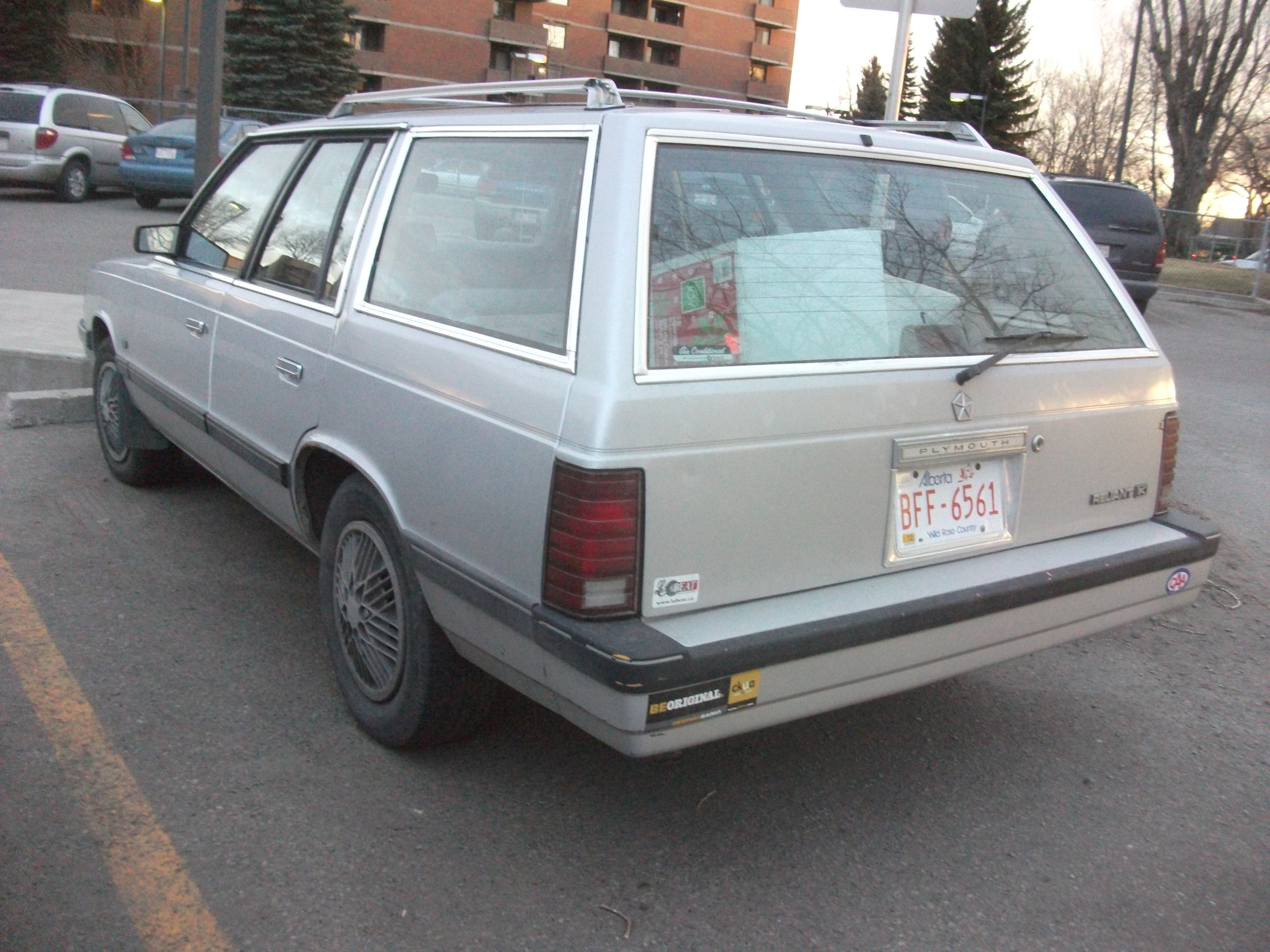
1986–1988 Plymouth Reliant station wagon

The popularity of the station wagon: particularly full-size station wagons; in the United States was blunted by increased fuel prices caused by the 1973 oil crisis. Then, in 1983, the market for station wagons was further eroded by the Chrysler minivans, based on the K platform. While the K platform was also used for station wagon models (such as the Plymouth Reliant and Dodge Aries), the minivan would soon eclipse them in popularity.

The CAFE standards provided an advantage to minivans (and later SUVs) over station wagons because the minivans and SUVs were classified as trucks in the United States and, therefore subject to less stringent fuel economy and emissions regulations. Station wagons remained popular in Europe and in locations where emissions and efficiency regulations did not distinguish between cars and light trucks.

==== 1990 to present: Competition from SUVs ====
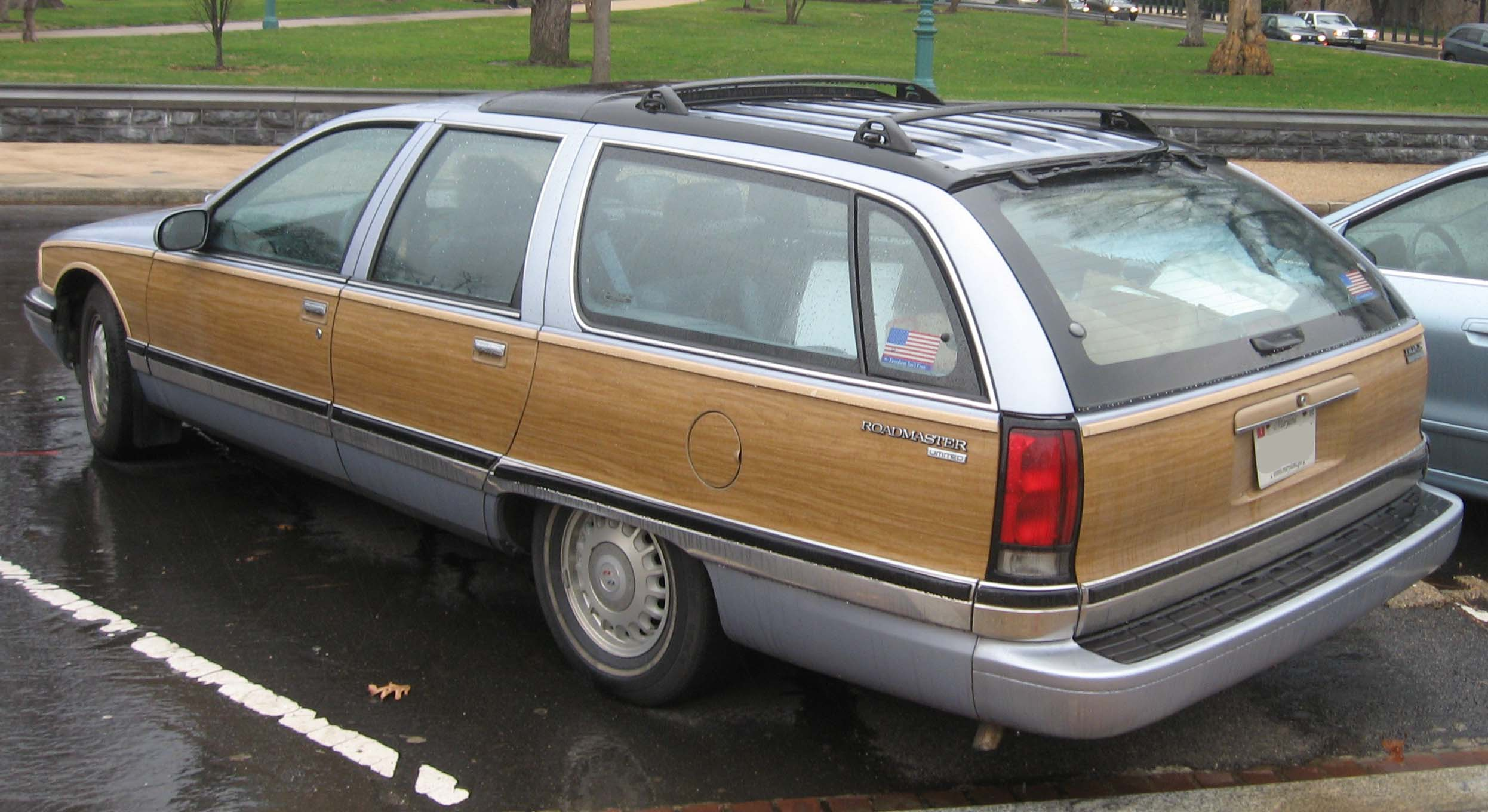
1996 Buick Roadmaster Estate Limited station wagon

The emergence and popularity of SUVs, which closely approximate the traditional station wagon body style, was a blow. After low sales, the Chevrolet Caprice and the Buick Roadmaster, the last American full-size wagons, were discontinued in 1996. Smaller station wagons were marketed as lower-priced alternatives to SUVs and minivans. Domestic wagons also remained in the Ford, Mercury, and Saturn lines. However, after 2004, these compact station wagons also began to be phased out in the United States. The Ford Taurus wagon was discontinued in 2005, and the Ford Focus station wagon was discontinued in 2008. With other brands, the niche previously occupied by station wagons is now primarily filled with a similar style of Crossover SUV, which generally has a car underpinning and a wagon body.

An exception to this trend was the Subaru Legacy station wagon and its rugged derivative Subaru Outback, which continued to be produced at the Subaru of Indiana plant. The Outback was much more popular than the Legacy wagon and Legacy sedan, the latter two which were discontinued after the 2014 and 2025 model years, respectively. The Outback accounted for 80% of wagon sales in the U.S. However for the seventh generation, as there was no Legacy sedan counterpart being produced on the same platform, the Outback is no longer considered a wagon and instead is a mid-sized crossover SUV.

The Cadillac CTS gave rise to a station wagon counterpart, the 2010 CTS Sportwagon, which defied the trend by offering almost as many trim levels as its sedan counterpart. The CTS wagon, particularly in the performance CTS-V trim, received positive reviews until it was discontinued in 2014.

In 2011, the Toyota Prius V introduced hybrid power to the compact wagon market, but was discontinued in 2017 to streamline the Toyota hybrid lineup and focus on the RAV4 Hybrid Crossover SUV.

Imported station wagons, despite remaining popular in other countries, struggled in the United States. European car manufacturers such as Audi, Volvo, BMW, and Mercedes-Benz continued to offer station wagons in their North American product ranges (marketed using the labels "Avant", "Touring", and "Estate" respectively). However, these wagons had fewer trim and powertrain levels than their sedan counterparts. Audi has also offered rugged variants of the A4 and A6 wagons under the Audi allroad quattro sub-brand with mixed success in the U.S., while Mercedes-Benz has offered the E-Class All-Terrain based upon the E-Class Estate. The station wagons of the smaller Mercedes-Benz C-Class line-up were dropped in 2007, and the BMW 5 Series Touring models were discontinued in 2010 due to slow sales in the United States, with only 400 wagons sold in 2009. In 2012, the Volvo V50 compact station wagon was withdrawn from the U.S. market due to poor sales. In 2016, Volvo reintroduced a large wagon to the U.S. market with the Volvo V90, but only by special order. Some high-performance wagons have been offered in the U.S. market, including the Audi RS 6, BMW M5, and Mercedes-Benz E63 AMG; the more recent generations of the Audi RS 6 have only been offered as an Avant and not a sedan but nonetheless this is still appealing to American car enthusiasts and collectors.

The 2015 VW Golf Sportwagen was marketed as a sub-compact station wagon in the North American market. This model was withdrawn from the U.S. market after 2019.

==== Simulated wood paneling ====
As the wooden bodies were replaced by steel from 1945 until 1953, manufacturers applied wooden decorative trim to the steel-bodied wagons as a visual link to the previous wooden style. By the late 1950s, the wooden trim was replaced by "simulated wood" in the form of stick-on vinyl coverings. The woodgrain feature is not that the body is wood: or that it could ever be wood; rather, it is "totally honest in its artificiality".

The design element was also used on cars that were not station wagons, including sedans, pickup trucks, and convertibles.

Unique simulated wood designs included trim on the body pillars of the compact-size Nash Rambler station wagons that went up the roof's drip rail and around on the spit liftgate. The larger-sized Cross Country station wagon was available with bodyside wood trim that went unbroken up the C and D pillars to a thin strip on the roof above the side windows.

Ford marketing began using “Country Squire” with the 1950 model year for the station wagon body design. From 1950 through 1991, their simulated wood trim differentiated the Ford Country Squire station wagon models from the lower trim versions. The "Squire" trim level was an available option in a few different Ford model ranges, including the Falcon Squire, Fairlane Squire, and the 1970s the Pinto Squire. The Squire was the highest trim level of any Ford Wagon and included additional exterior and better interior trims.

Other woodie-style wagon models produced in significant numbers include the 1984 through 1993 Jeep Grand Wagoneer that launched the luxury SUV market segment. Simulated wood-grain trim differentiated the top level models of the 1957–1991 Mercury Colony Park, 1968–1988 Chrysler Town & Country, 1970–1990 Buick Estate, 1971–1992 Oldsmobile Custom Cruiser, and 1969–1972 Chevrolet Kingswood Estate.

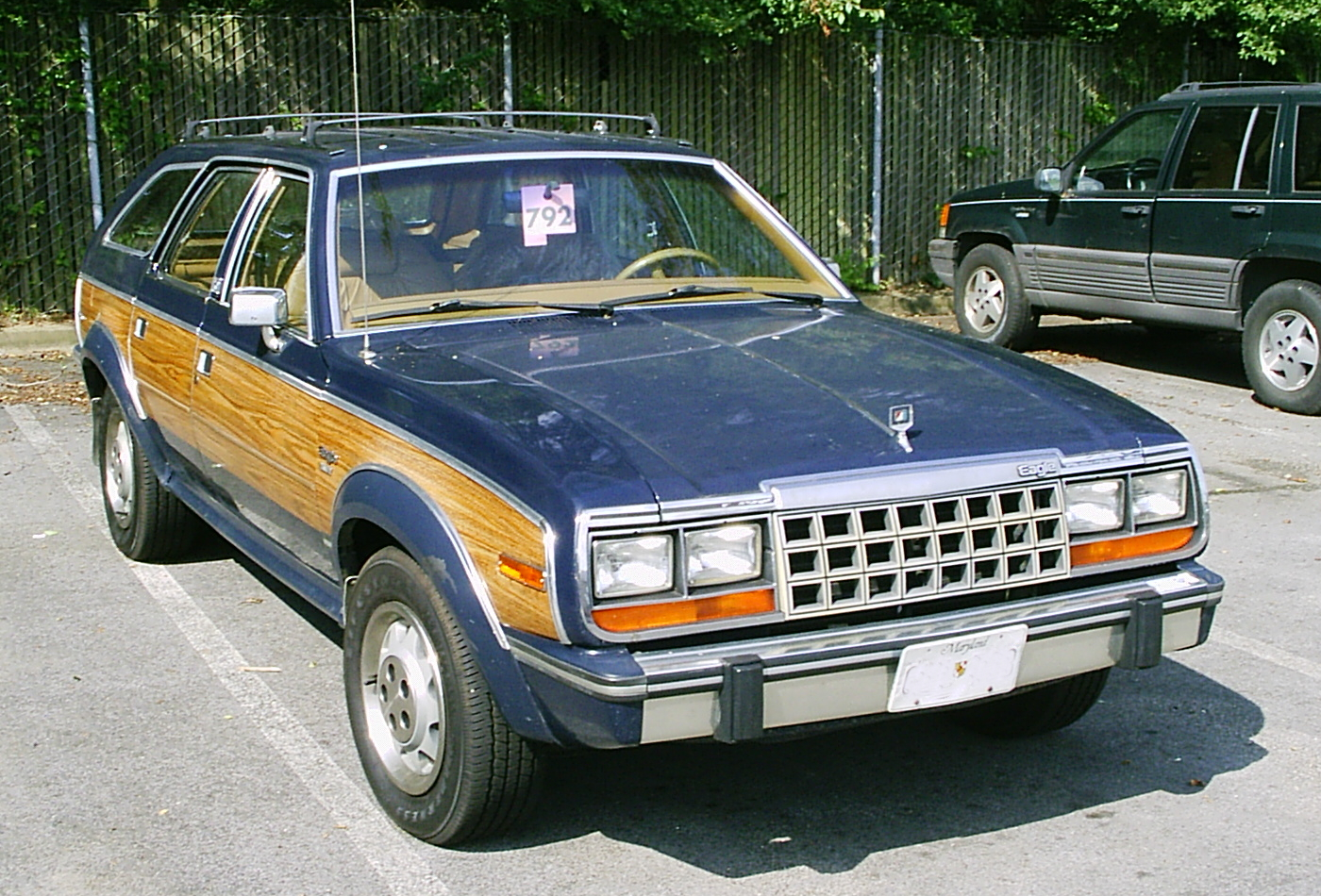
1988 AMC Eagle Wagon with simulated wood trim

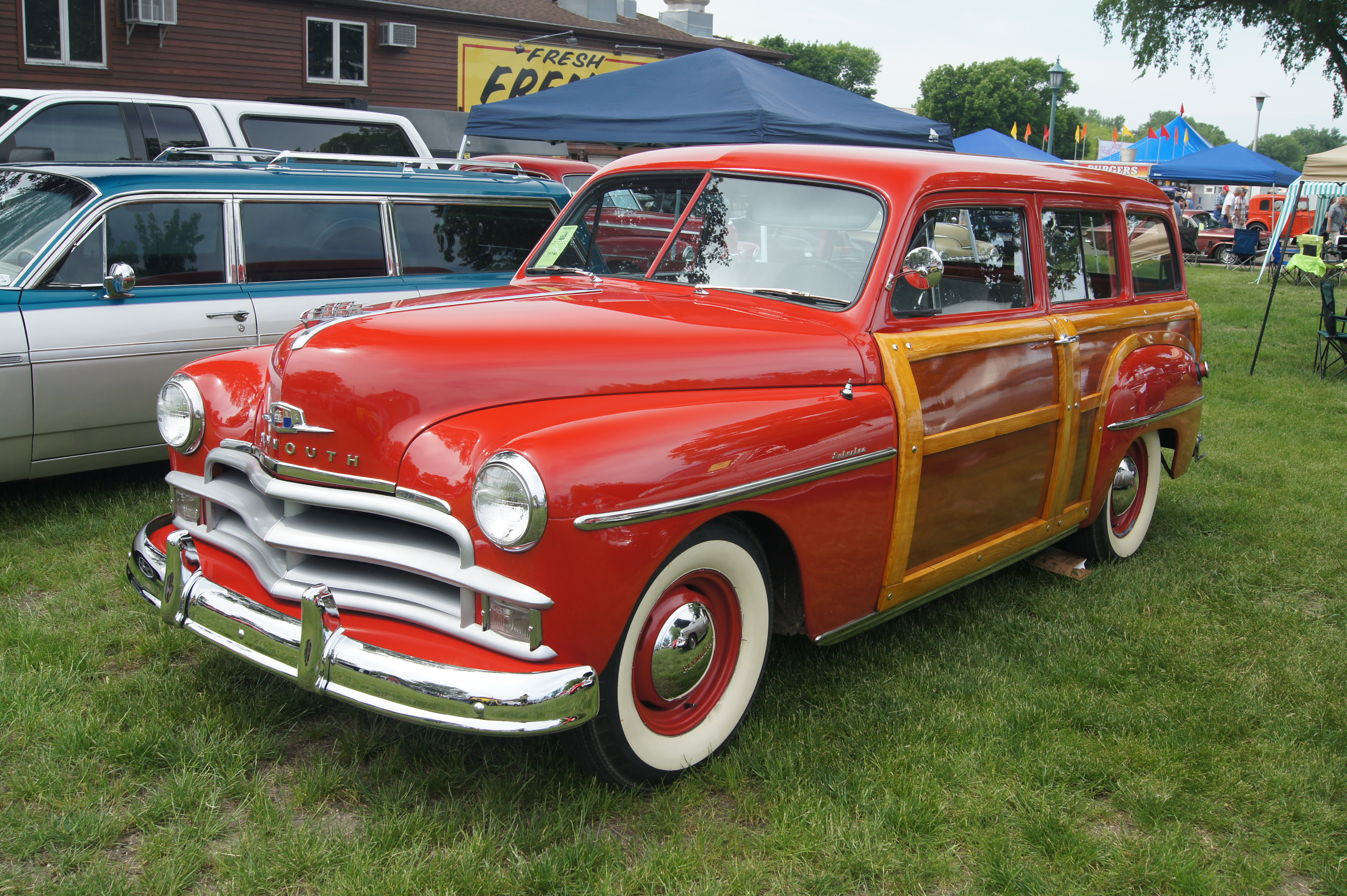
1950 Plymouth Woodie Station Wagon

==== Full-size wagons ====
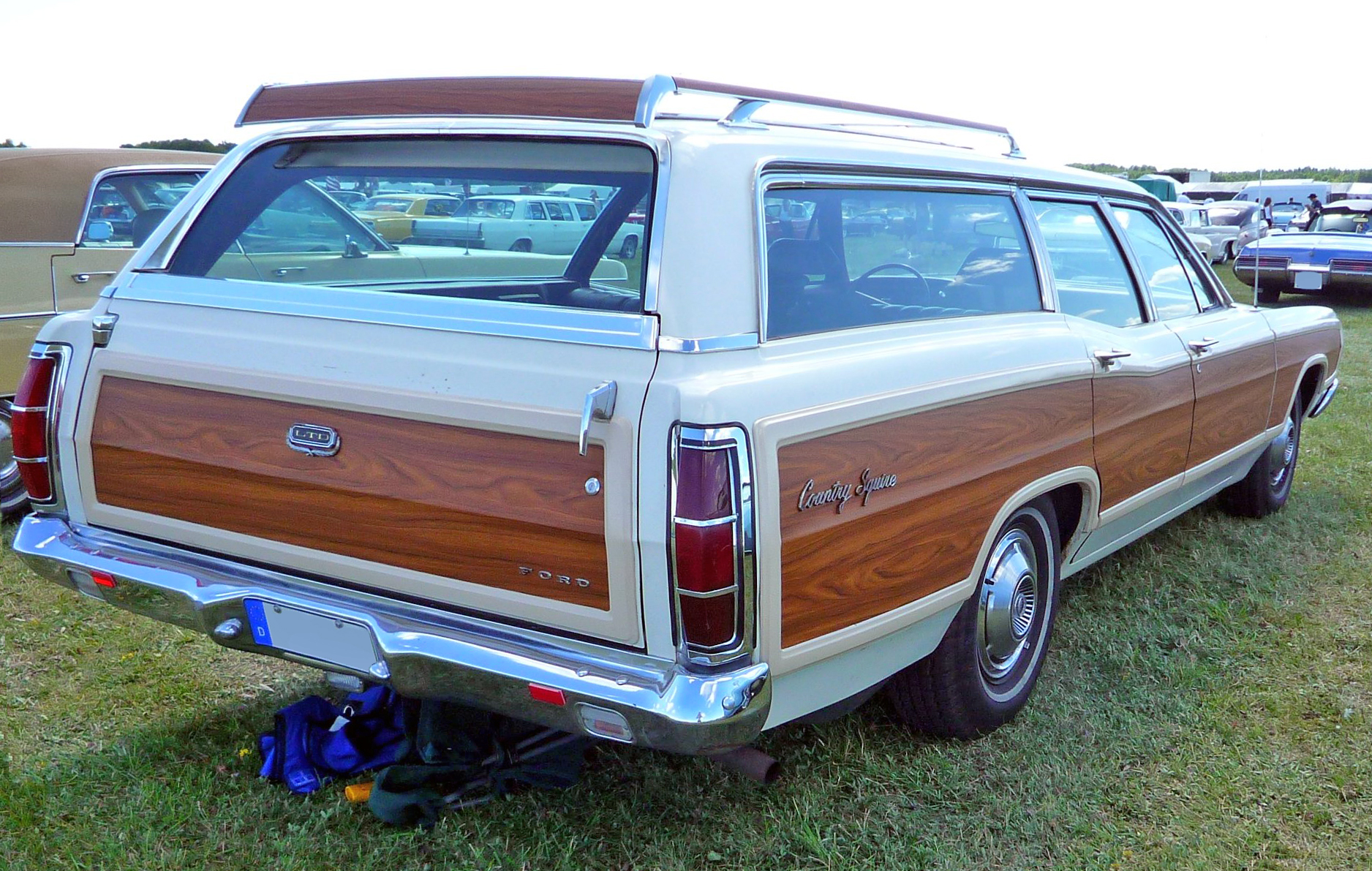
1969 Ford LTD Country Squire

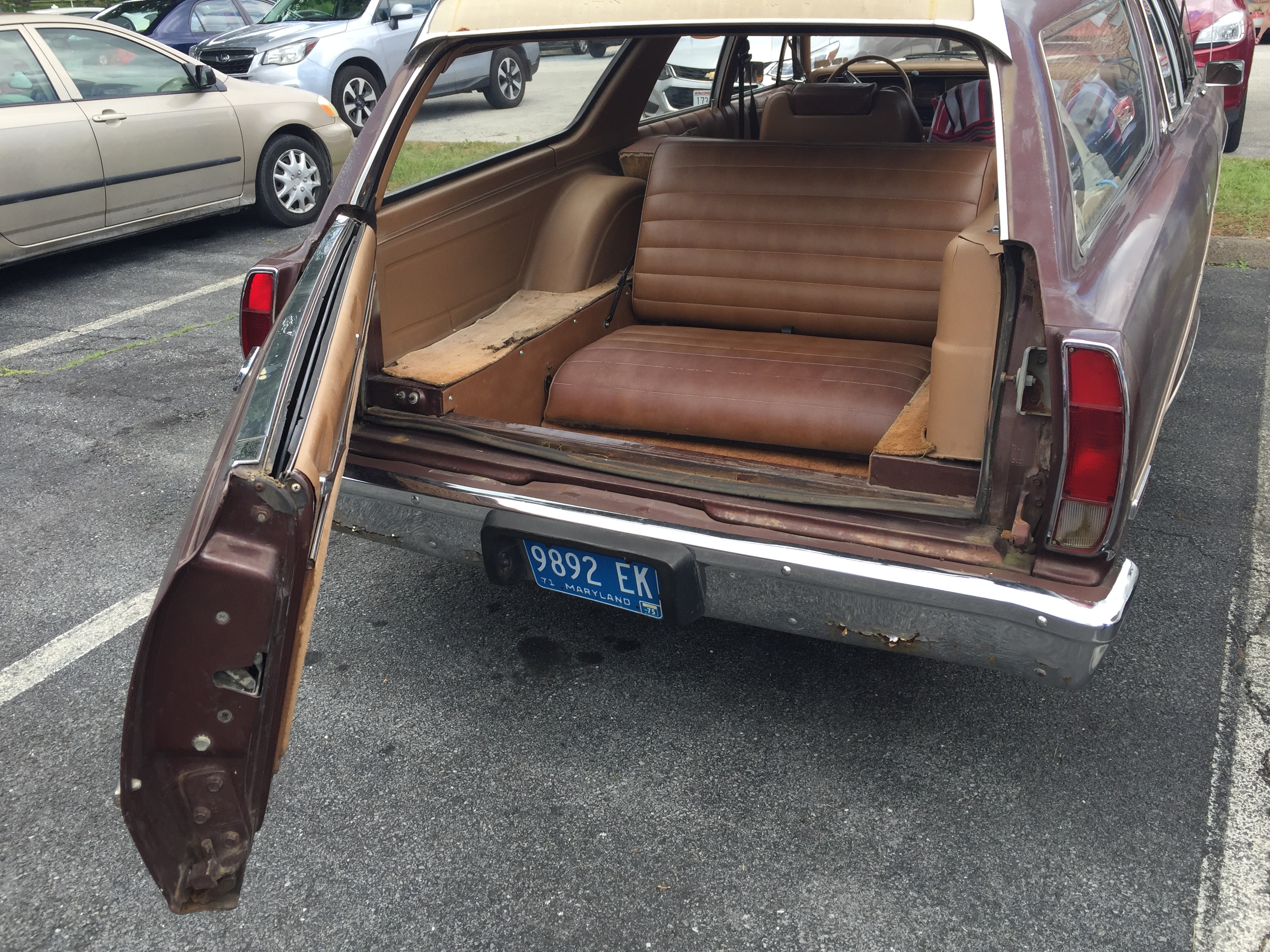
1975 AMC Matador with third-row seat and two-way tailgate open for passenger egress

From the 1950s until the 1990s, many full-size American station wagons could be optioned with a third row of seating in the cargo area (over the rear axle) for a total of nine seats. Before 1956, the third-row seats were forward-facing.

Chrysler's 1957 models had a roof too low to permit a forward-facing seat in the cargo area, so a rear-facing seat was used for the third row.

General Motors adopted the rear-facing third row for most models during 1959–1971 and 1977–1996. However, the 1964–1972 Oldsmobile Vista Cruiser and 1964–1969 Buick Sport Wagon featured raised roof lines beginning above the second-row seat and continuing to the rear tailgate, resulting in the third row of seats being forward-facing. General Motors also used forward-facing seats for the third row from 1971 through 1976 clam shell wagons.

The Ford and Mercury full-size wagons built after 1964 were available with four rows of seats, with the rear two rows in the cargo area facing each other. The third and fourth rows were designed for two people each (although these seats were relatively narrow in later models), giving a total seating capacity of ten people.

The trend since the 1980s for smaller station wagon bodies has limited the seating to two rows, resulting in a total capacity of five people, or six people, if a bench front seat is used. Since the 1990s, full-size station wagons have been largely replaced by SUVs with three-row seating, such as the Chevrolet Suburban, Ford Expedition, Dodge Durango, Land Rover Defender 130 and the Range Rover, Mercedes-Benz GLS-Class, and BMW X7.

==== Two-door wagons ====
The first two-door station wagon was the 1946 Willys Jeep Station Wagon. Other early two-door station wagons were the 1951 Nash Rambler and the 1954 Studebaker Conestoga. In 1956, Studebaker introduced three new two-door wagons in Pelham, Parkview, and Pinehurst trims.

General Motors began producing two-door station wagons in 1955 with the "Chevrolet Handyman" and the "Pontiac Chieftain". General Motors also introduced the sportier Chevrolet Nomad and Pontiac Safari to their lineup in 1955. Ford began production of steel-bodied two-door station wagons in 1952 with the Ford Ranch Wagon. In 1956, Ford responded to the Nomad and Safari with the two-door wagon, the Ford Parklane. This was a one-year-only model, succeeded by the Ford Del Rio in 1957.

After the merger of Nash and Hudson, the new company, American Motors (AMC), reintroduced the two-door wagon in the "new" Rambler American line in 1958. It was "recycling" with only a few modifications from the original version and targeted buyers looking for "no-frills" economy. American Motors' strategy of reintroducing an old design made for two distinct model runs, one of few examples where such a strategy has been successful for an automobile manufacturer.

The Chevrolet Vega Kammback, introduced in September 1970, was the first U.S.-made four-seat wagon and the first two-door wagon from GM in six years. It shared its wheelbase and length with Vega coupe versions and was produced in the 1971 through 1977 model years.

American Motors offered a two-door wagon version of the AMC Pacer from 1977 through 1980. The wagon embodied all the features and handling of the coupe, including the wheelbase, while only 2.5 in (64 mm) longer and increasing cargo capacity to 48.3 cu ft (1,368 L) with the rear seat down.

The last two-door wagon available marketed in the United States, the Geo Storm was the 1991 and 1992 "Wagonback", featuring a long roof and a rear hatch in place of the sloping liftback versions.

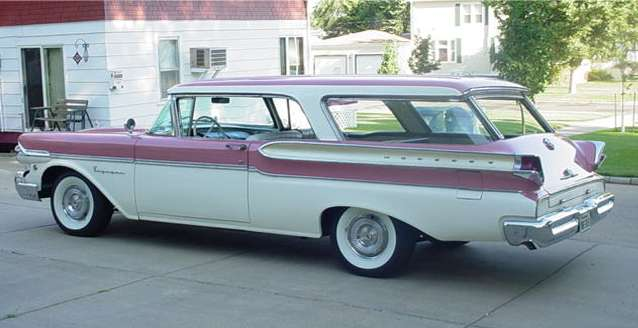
1958 Mercury Commuter hardtop

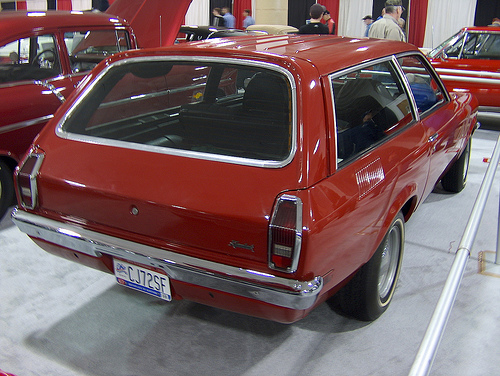
1971 Chevrolet Vega Kammback

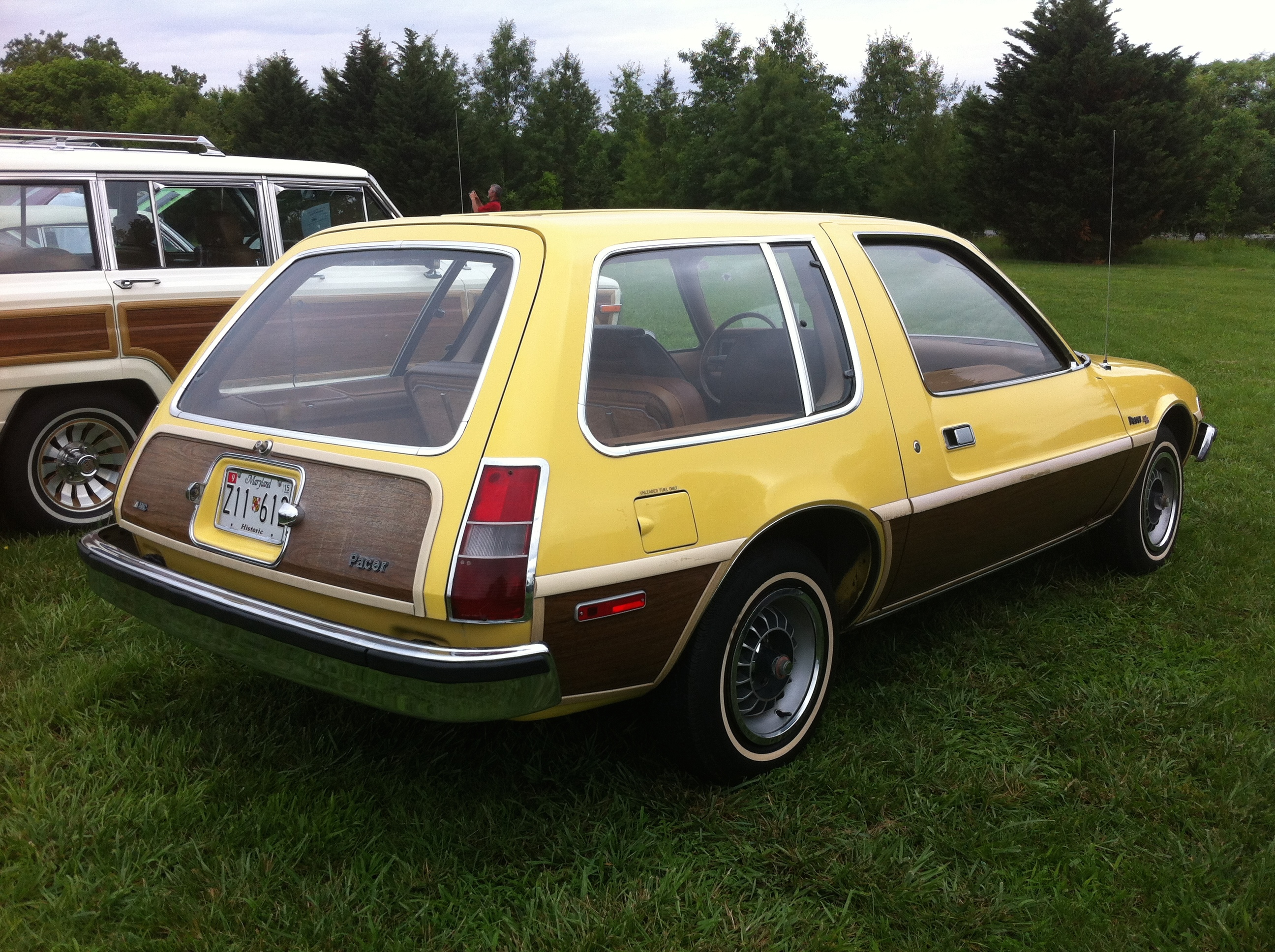
1977 AMC Pacer DL

=== United Kingdom ===
==== 1930s to 1950s ====
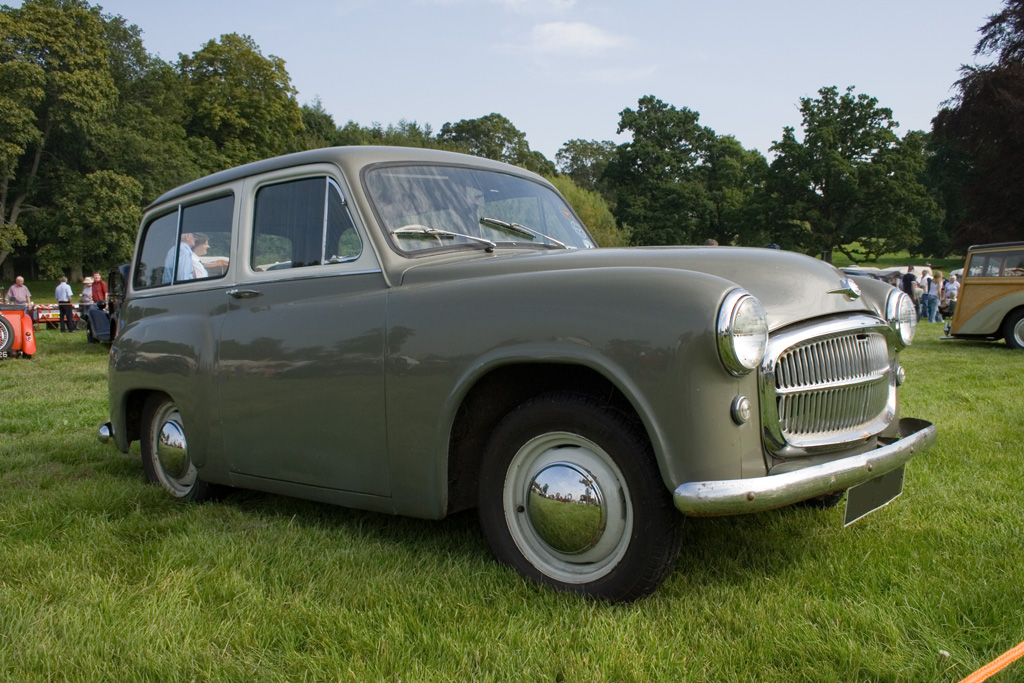
1954–1957 Hillman Husky

Early estate cars were after-market conversions, with the new bodywork using a wooden frame and either steel or wooden panels. These wooden-bodied cars, produced until the 1960s, were among the most expensive vehicles. Since the 1930s, the term shooting-brake (originally a term for hunting vehicles) has been an alternative, if now rarely used, to the term for estates in the UK.

Later, estates were produced by vehicle manufacturers and included the 1937 Commer (based on the Hillman Minx Magnificent) designed for "operators requiring reliable light transport units" and the chassis for the Supervan "multipurpose utility vehicle, primarily designed for estate transport ... seating accommodation for five persons and the driver ... being quickly convertible to carry anything from hunting equipment to farm produce." Others included the 1952 Morris Minor Traveller, 1952 Morris Oxford Traveller, 1954 Hillman Husky, 1954 Austin A30 Countryman and 1955 Ford Squire. Most of these models were two-door estates, and several models were built on the chassis of relatively small cars.

Manufacturers often chose a specific model name to apply to all their estate cars as a marketing exercise - for example, Austin used the Countryman name, and Morris called it Traveller. Some estates were closely derived from existing commercial van models, such as the Austin A30/35 Countryman and the Hillman Husky. Others included the Austin Cambridge Countryman and the Standard Ten Companion.

Rover and Austin produced 4×4 canvas-topped utility vehicles in the 1950s that were available in estate body styles sold as "Station Wagons". They incorporated better seating and trim than standard editions with options such as heaters. Early advertising for the Land Rover version took the name literally, showing the vehicle collecting people and goods from a railway station.

Despite the popularity of station wagons in America, estate offerings in the U.K. from Ford and Vauxhall were limited to factory-approved aftermarket conversions of the Ford Consul and Vauxhall Cresta until the factory-built Vauxhall Victor wagon was introduced in 1958.

==== 1960s to 1970s ====
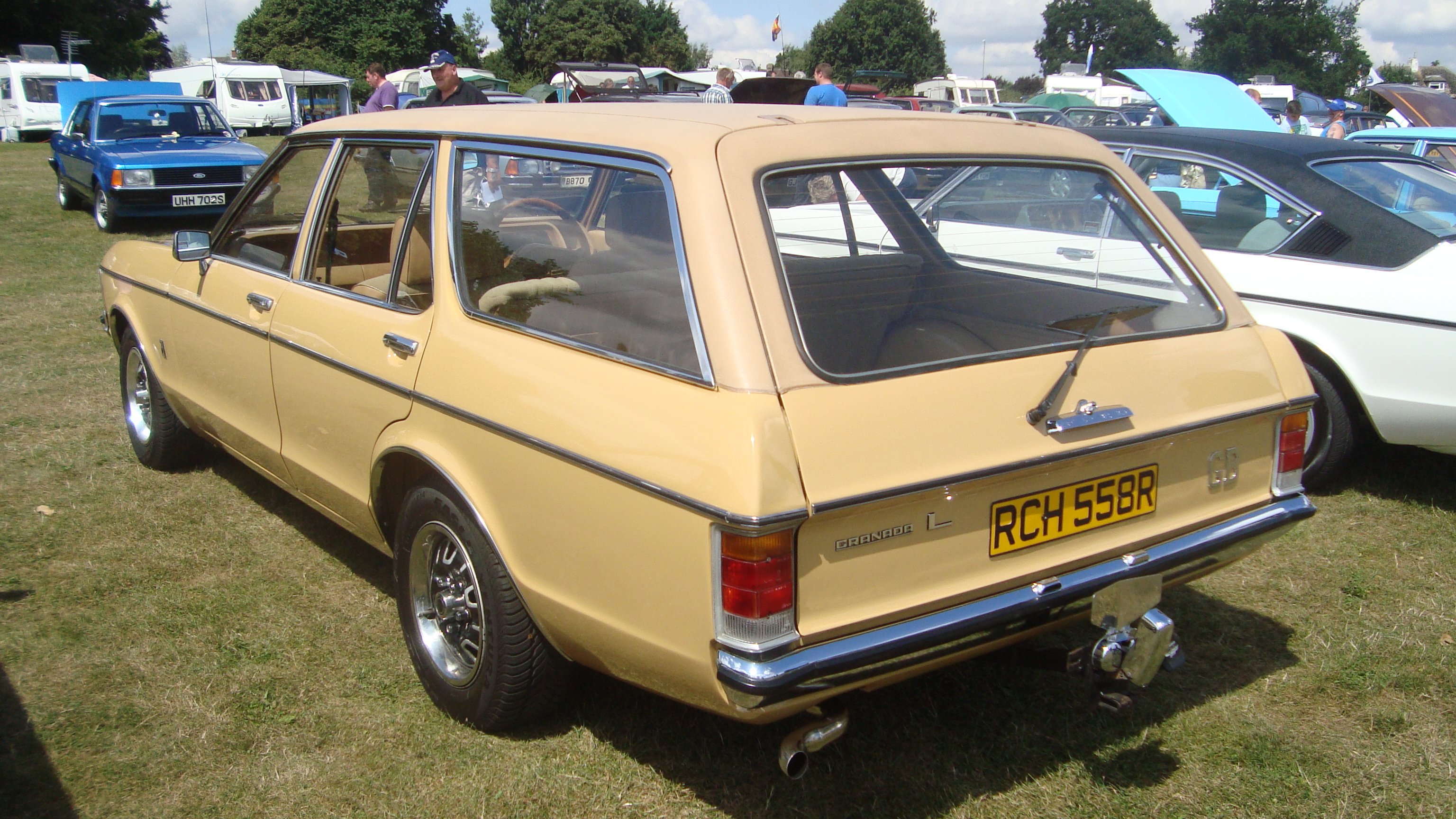
Ford Granada L Estate

One of the smallest estates ever produced was the Morris Mini Traveller / Austin Mini Countryman, introduced in 1960. Ford's first factory-built estate was the 1963 Ford Cortina.

The 1967 Hillman Husky station wagon version of the Hillman Imp was unusual in being a rear-engined estate.

Ford and Vauxhall produced factory-built estate variants of all three of their respective core models (small-, family- and large-size cars) by the 1970s. The FD- and FE-Series Vauxhall Victors, built between 1966 and 1978, were large cars and featured estate models in the style of an American station wagon with front and rear bench seats and large-capacity petrol engines.

Other estates sold in the United Kingdom included the Morris 1100 (introduced in 1966), Vauxhall Viva (introduced 1967), Ford Escort and Squire (introduced in 1968), and Vauxhall Chevette (introduced 1976).

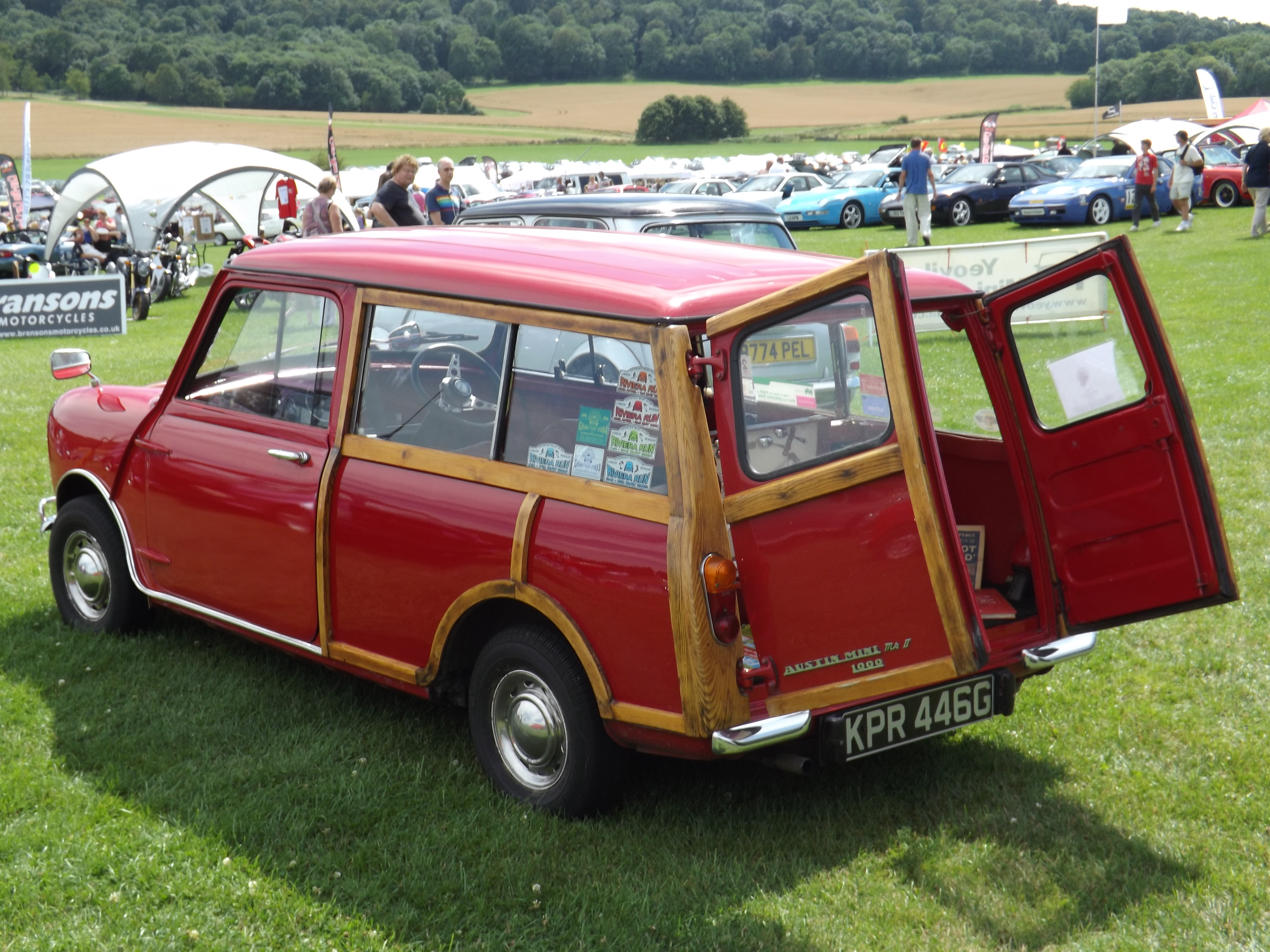
Austin Mini Traveller Mk.II 1000 1968-69

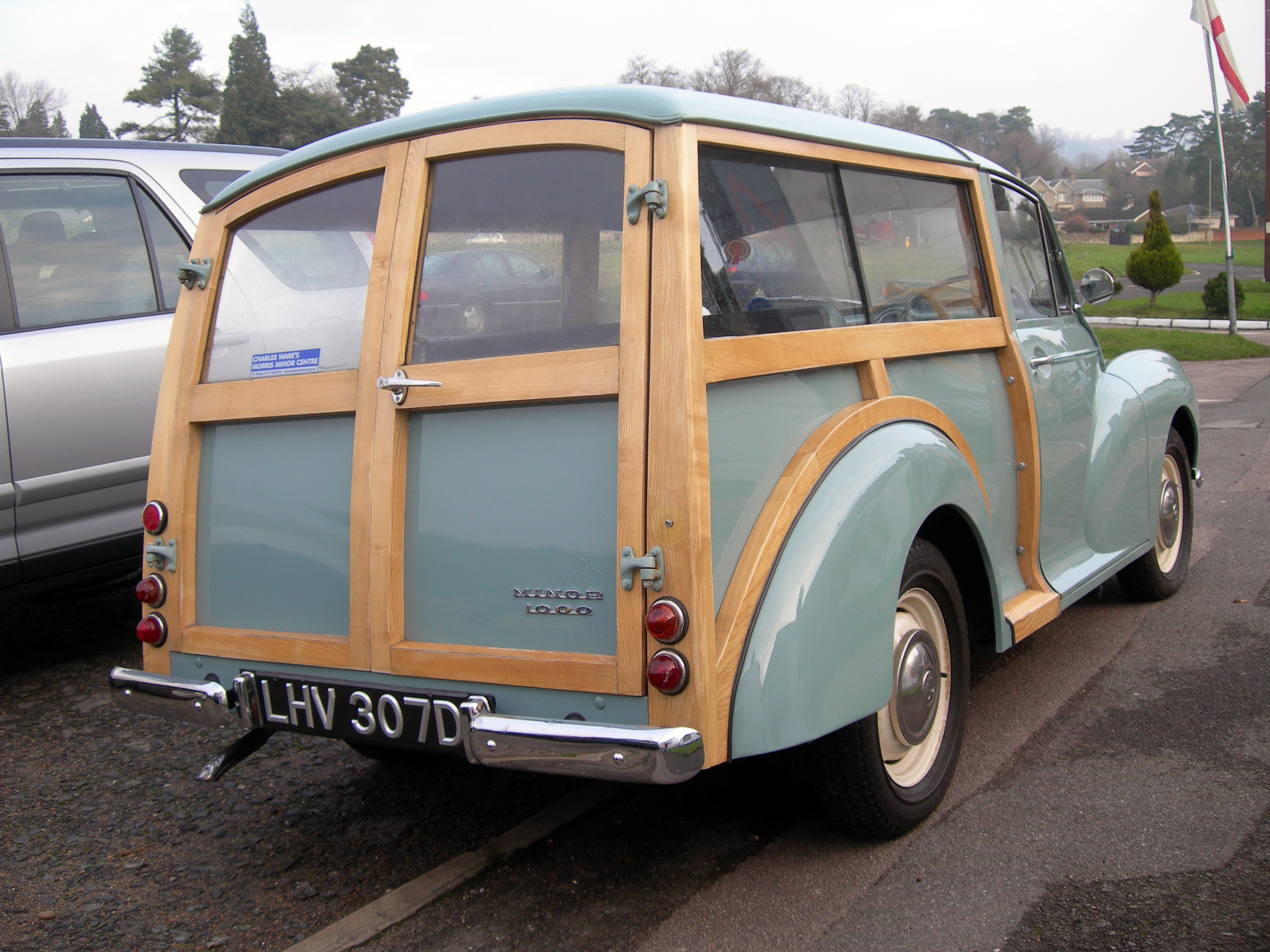
Morris Minor 1000 Traveller 1966

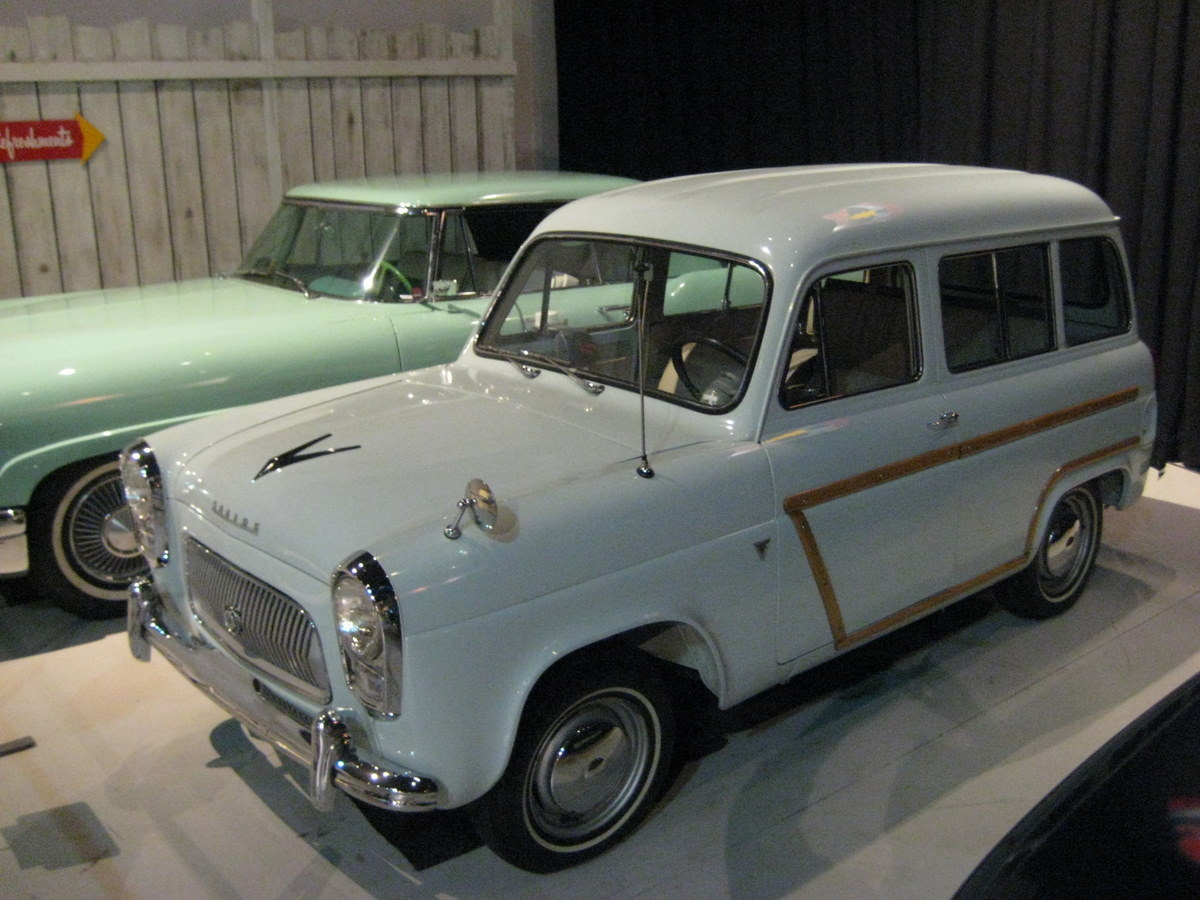
Ford 100E Squire with wood trim

==== 1980s to present ====
In the decades following, Vauxhall has produced the Astra family car from 1980 continuing till now in estate form, as well as other estate versions of larger cars such as the Cavalier, replaced in 1995 by the Vectra which itself was replaced in 2008 by the Insignia, staying in production till 2022. The second generation Insignia was also made in Country Tourer form, a slightly raised crossover version of the standard Insignia Sports Tourer. Between 1978 and 2003, they also sold estate versions of two executive cars, the Carlton and the Omega. Vauxhall also produced the Signum in the mid-2000s as an executive take on a Vectra estate, and it was only available in such a body style; the Insignia VXR, a high-performance variant of the Insignia available in its first generation could also be had as an estate, with a V6 engine producing 321 bhp.

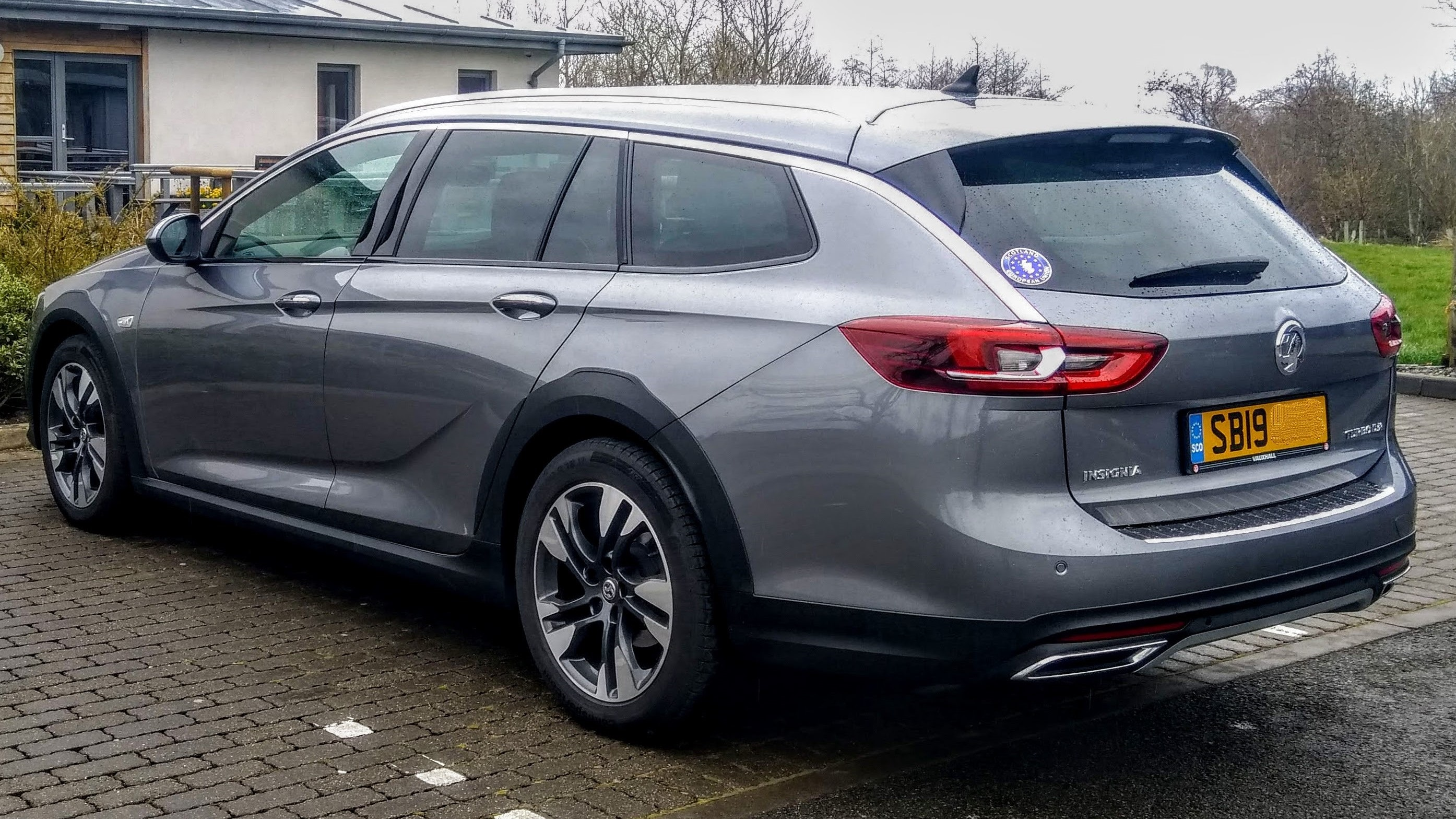
Vauxhall Insignia Country Tourer

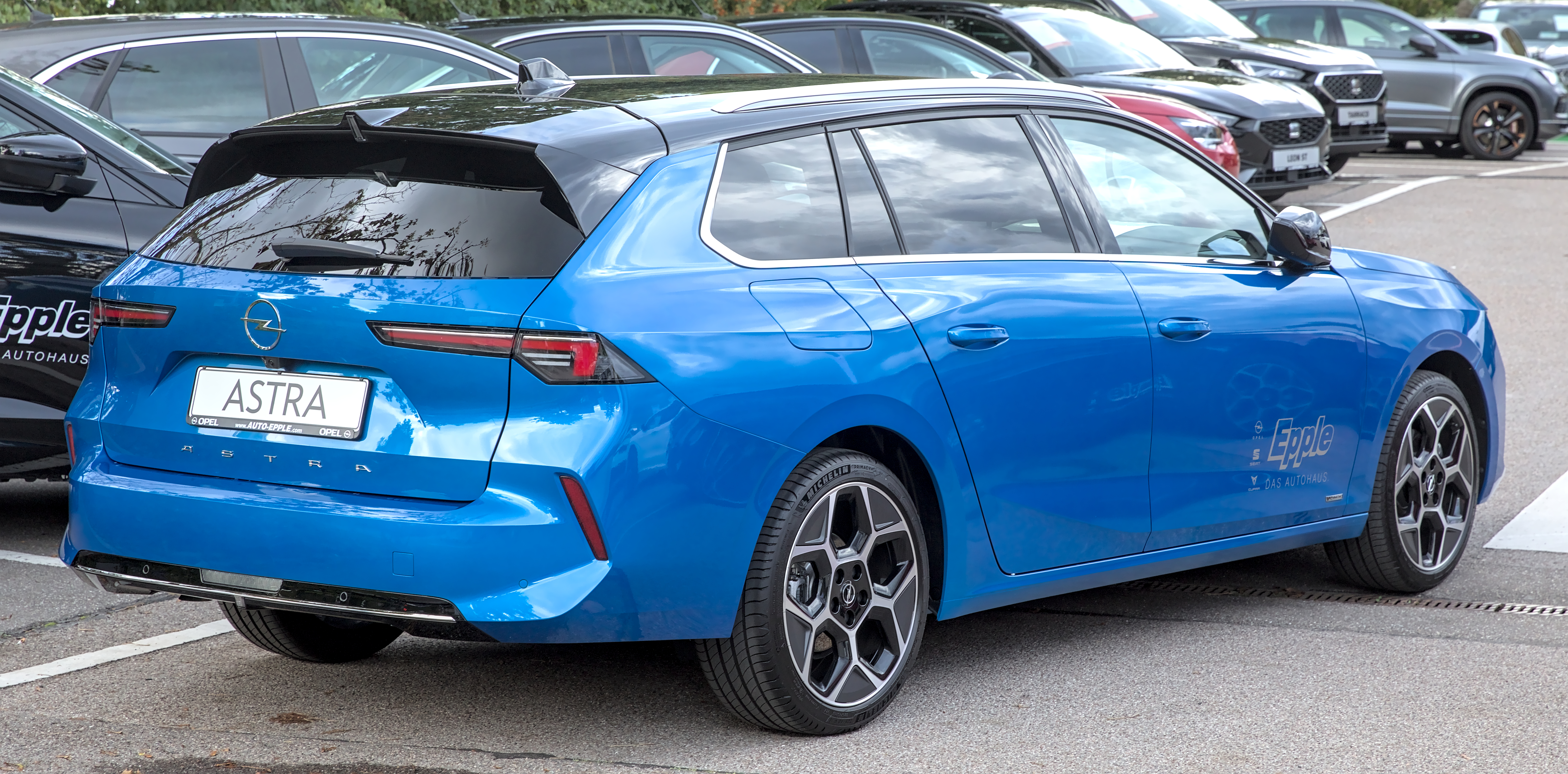
Opel Astra L Sports Tourer - estate version of the 11th generation Astra

Ford made a variety of estates, such as the Focus estate from 1998 that replaced the Escort, as well as the estate version of the family car Mondeo (1992–2022, which itself replaced the Sierra's estate variant made by Ford of Britain.

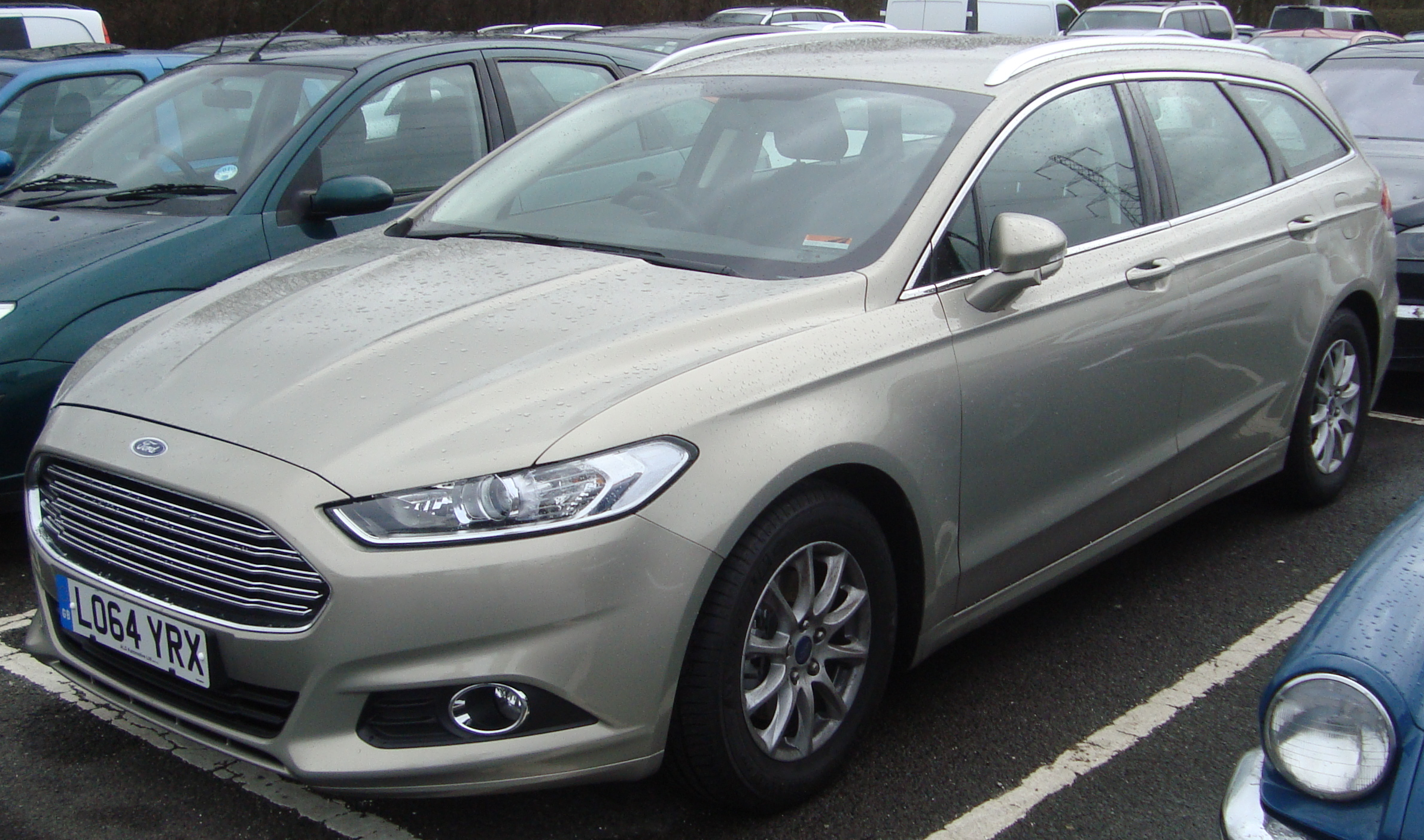
2015 Ford Mondeo estate

Jaguar produced the X-Type as an estate during the early 2000s, while the larger XF Sportbrake, produced from 2012, and the second generation, were available estate body style. The first generation had a 'floating roof' appearance as its D-pillars were blended with the rear and side windows to make it look like glass. The XFR-S was available with a 575 bhp (429 kW; 583 PS) 5.0 L supercharged V8, while the latter generation's most powerful engine was a 380 bhp (283 kW; 385 PS) 3.0 L supercharged V6.

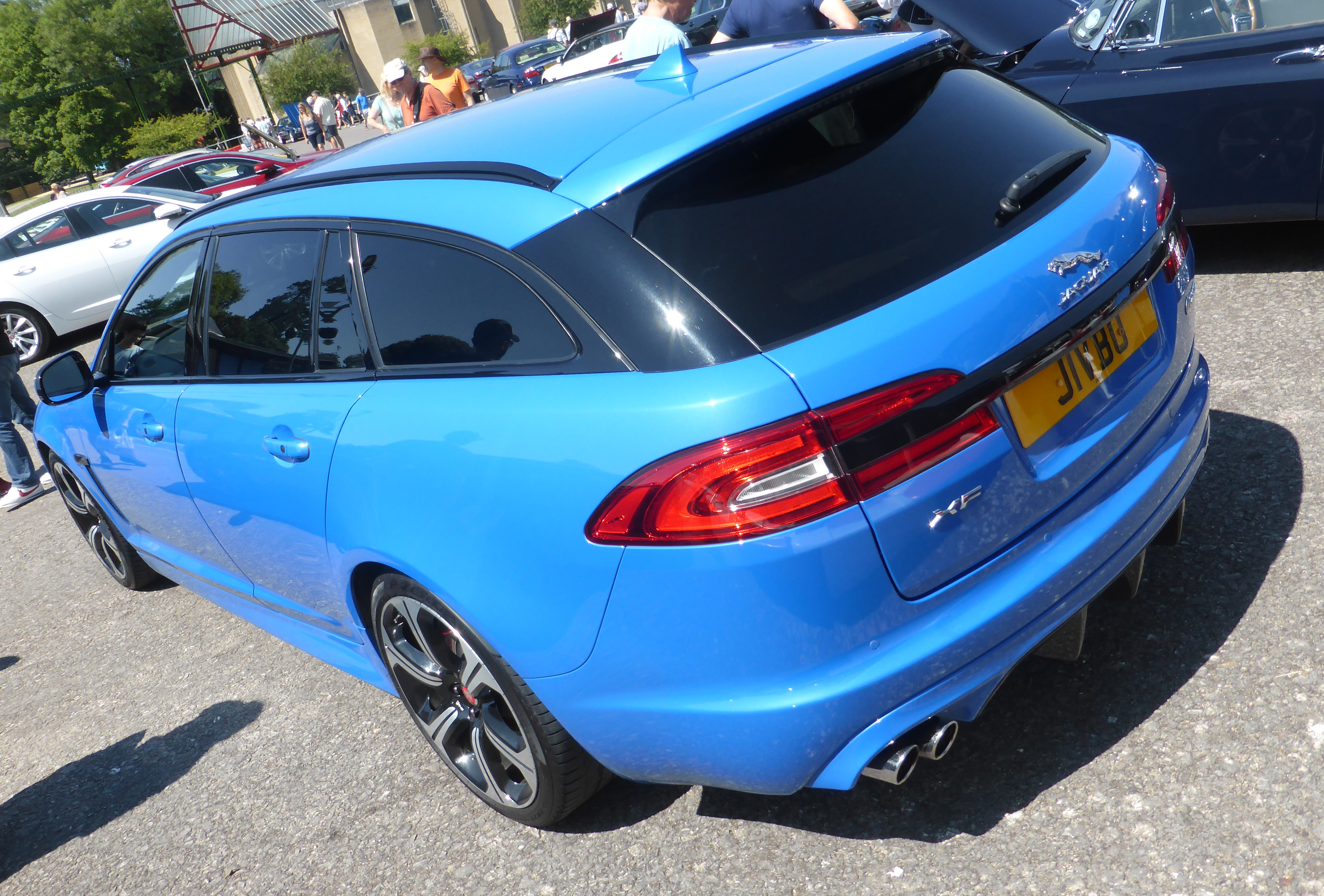
Jaguar XFR-S Sportbrake, showing the floating roof effect at the rear

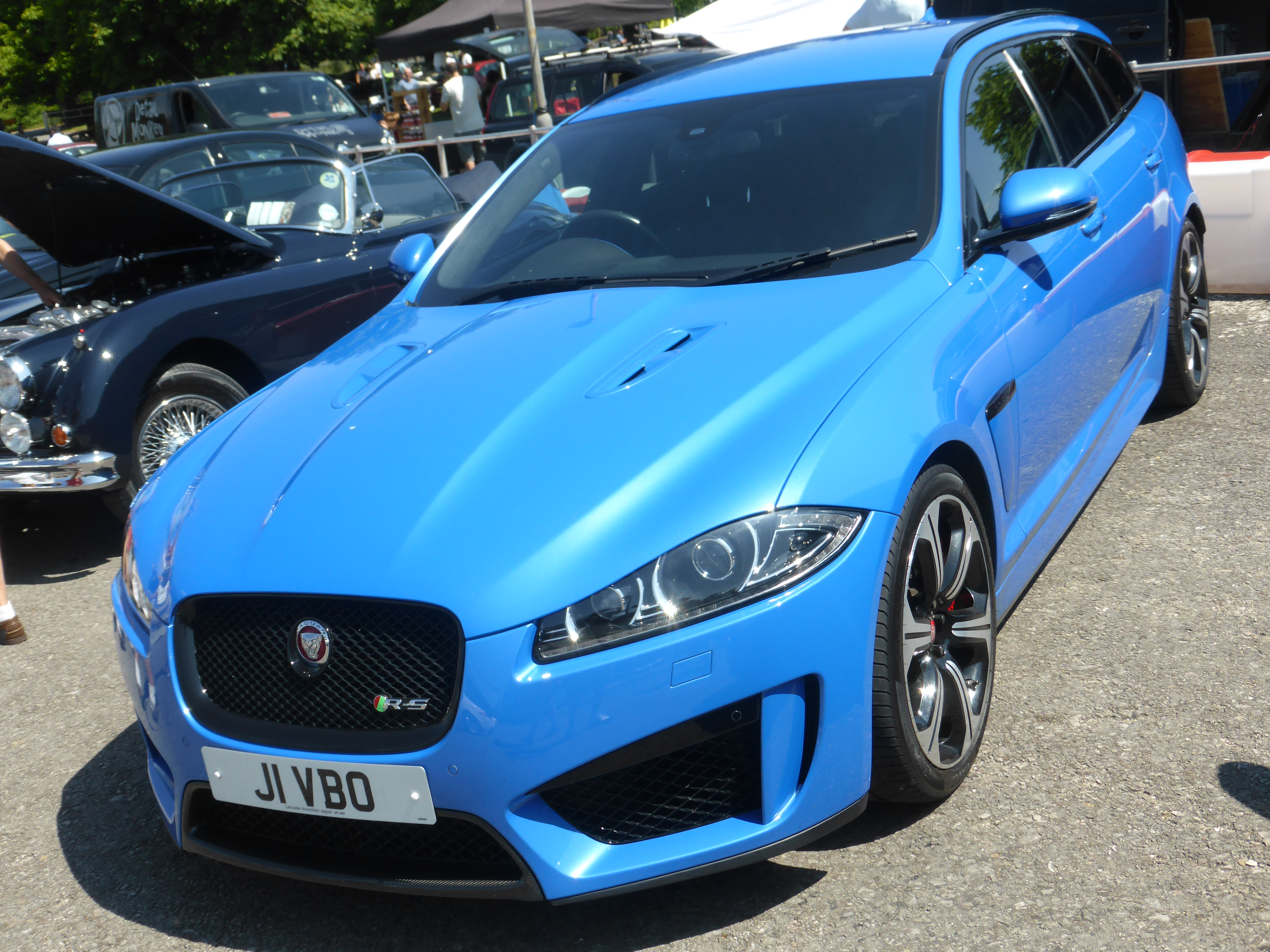
Front

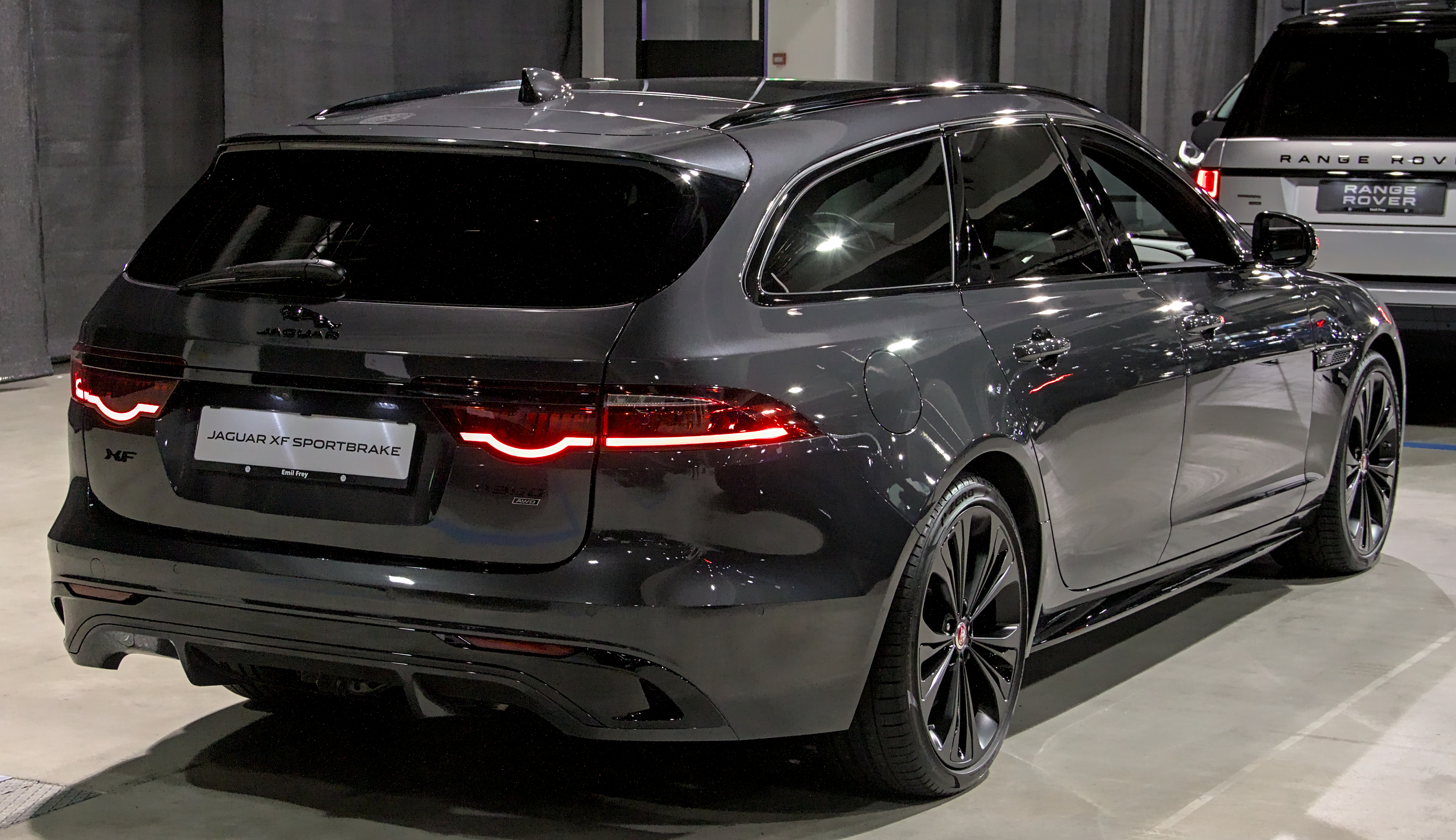
2021 Jaguar XF Sportbrake

The Mini Clubman, made from 2007 until 2024 in Oxford, is an estate car made unique by having a split side-opening tailgate across both generations and a shooting brake body style in its first, with a small rearward-opening door on its right-hand side for rear seat access. The second generation was available in the high-performance John Cooper Works trim with up to 302 bhp (225 kW; 306 PS).

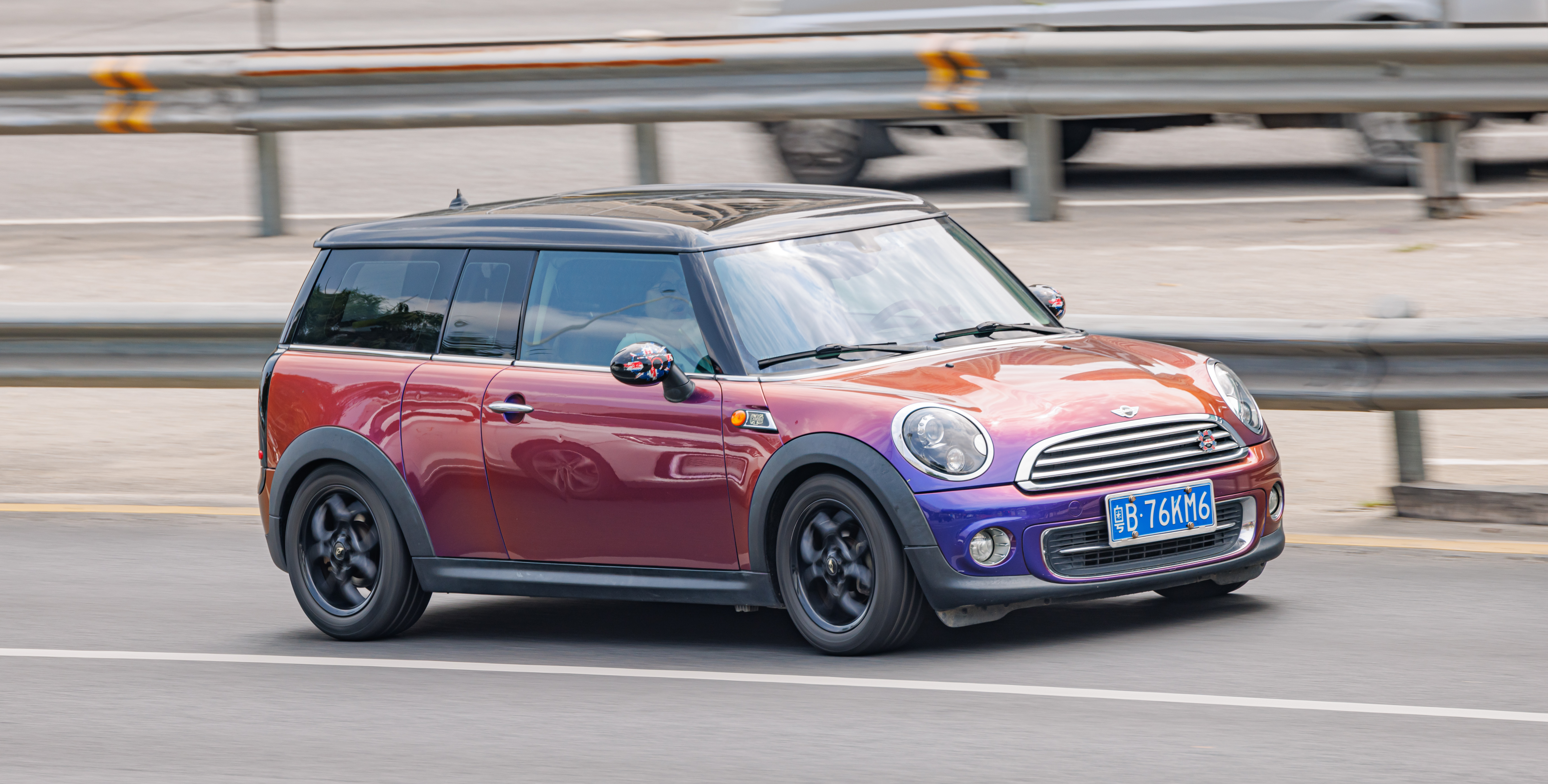
First generation Mini Clubman - shooting brake shape and right rearward-opening door visible

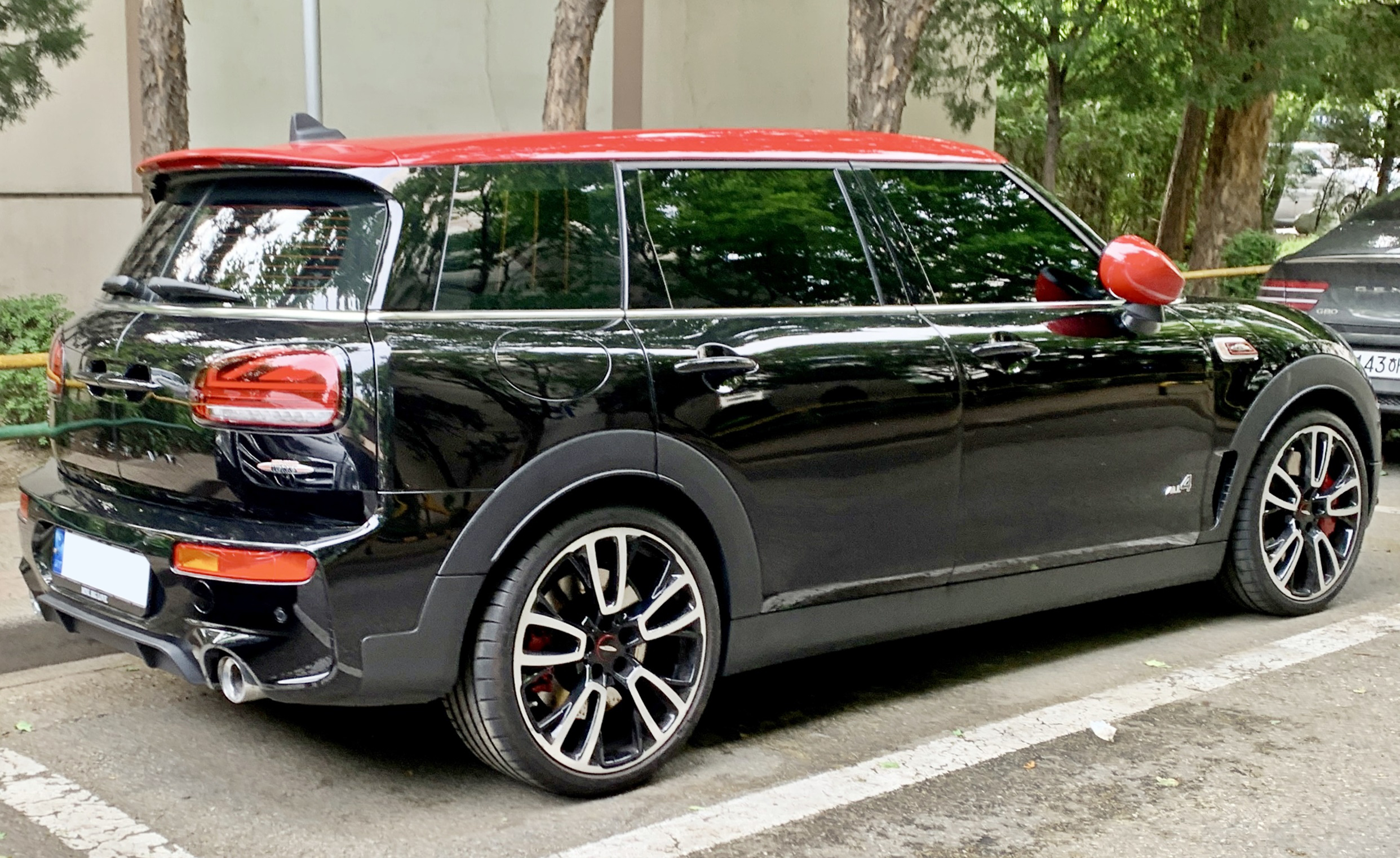
Mini Clubman JCW, demonstrating its split boot doors

MG marketed the MG5 EV - a rebadged Roewe Ei5, made in China - solely as an estate in the United Kingdom, the first estate since the brand's rebirth. Previously, MG sold the ZT, a badge-engineered Rover 75. This large family car also had the faster ZT-T version, a modified version of which, with over 800 bhp, gained the World's Fastest (non-production) Estate Car title in September 2003, with a top speed of 225.609 mph (363 km/h). Before its discontinuation, Rover produced various estate cars: the aforementioned 75, also sold in V8 form, and the Rover 400 in the 1990s.

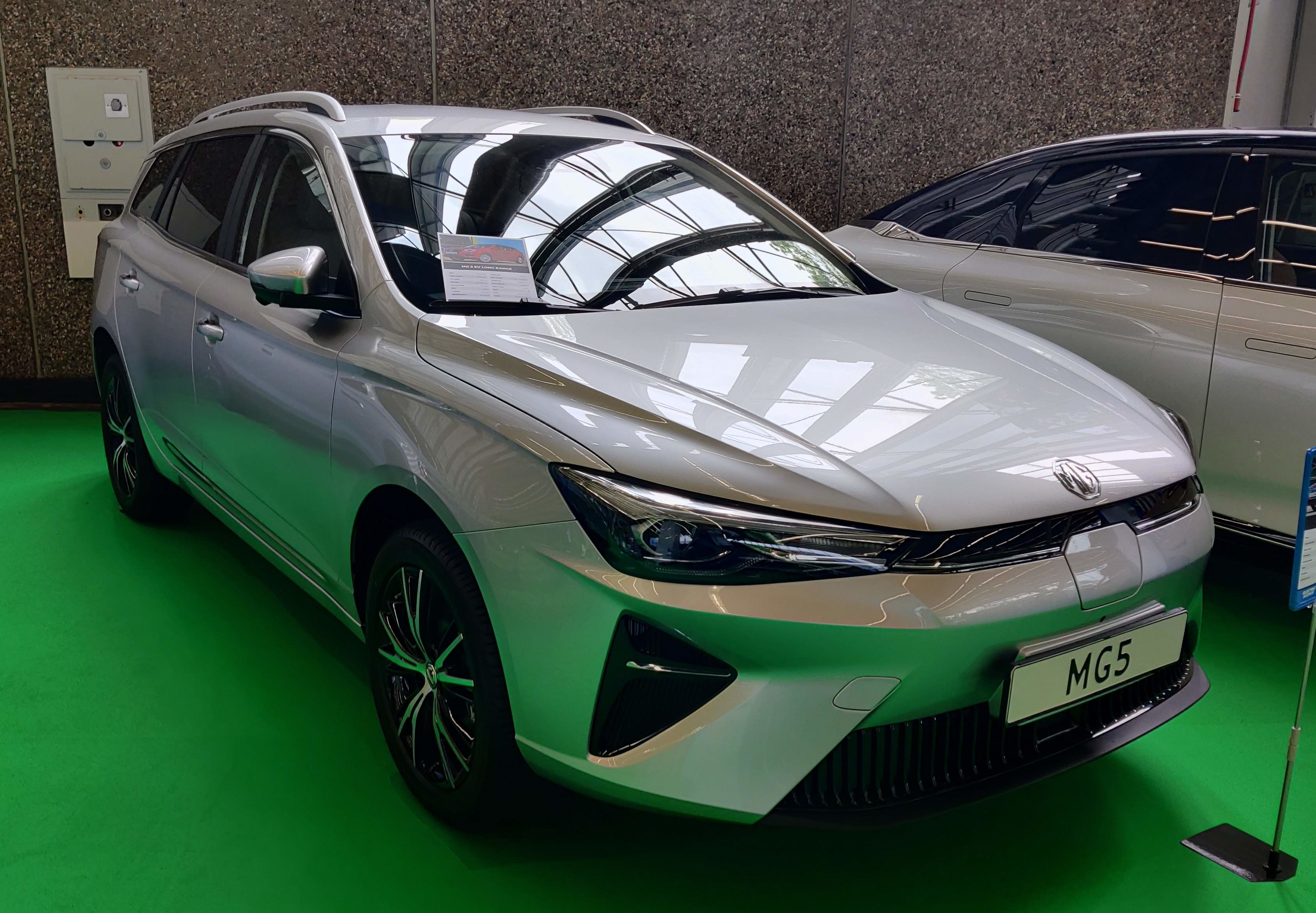
A 2022 MG5 EV

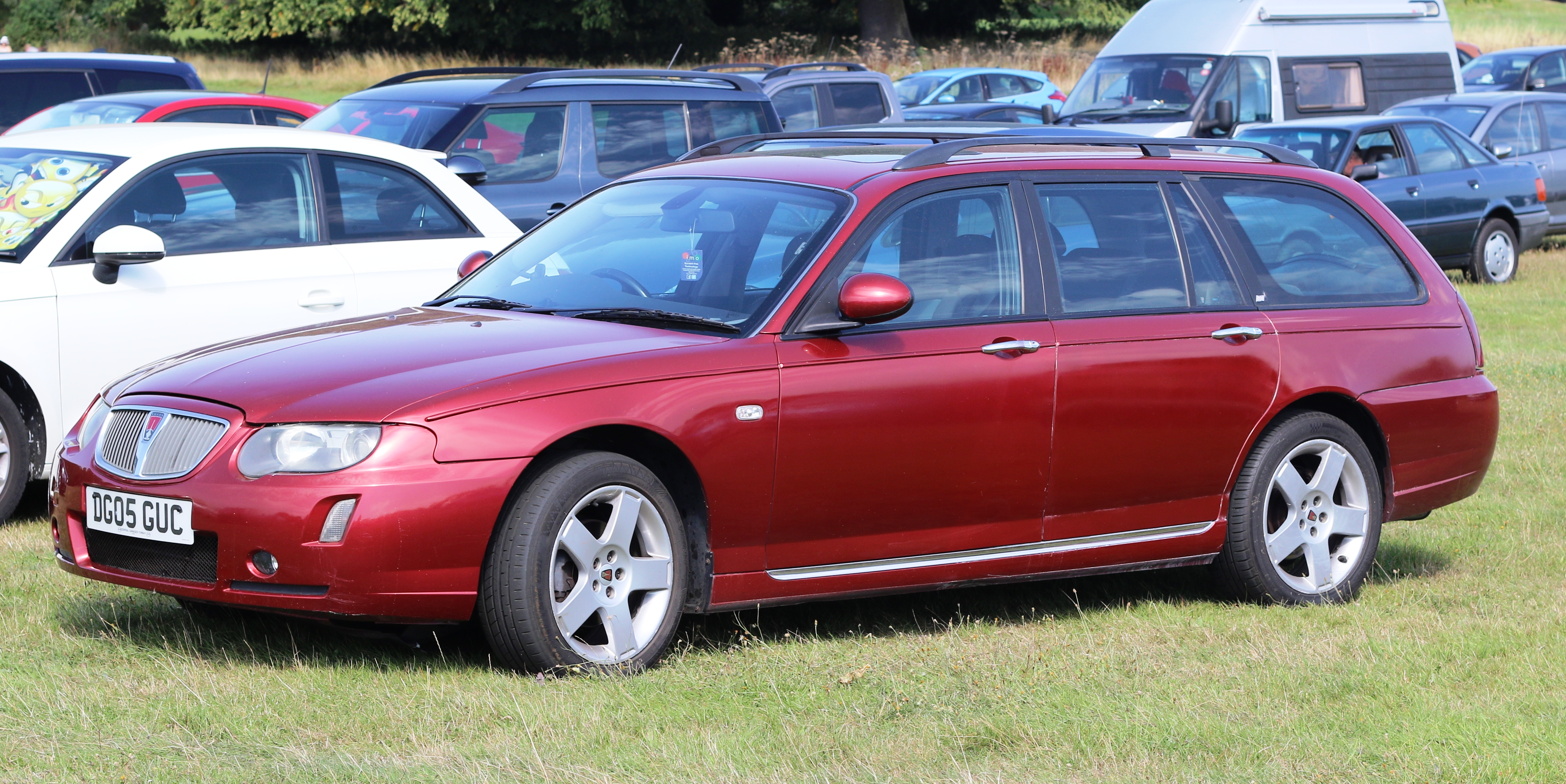
A 2005 Rover 75 estate

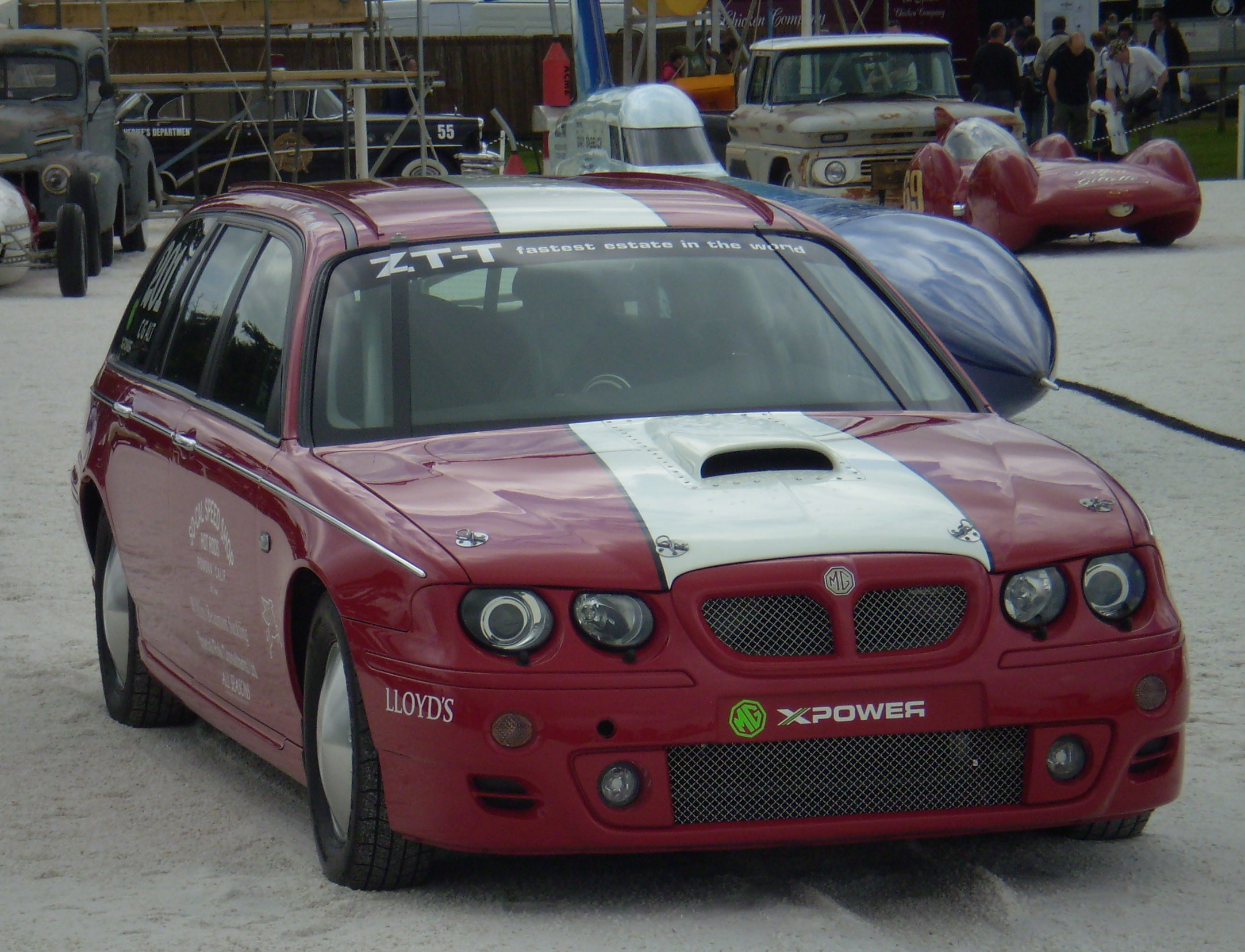
This MG ZT-T became the world's fastest (non-production) estate in 2003

=== Germany ===
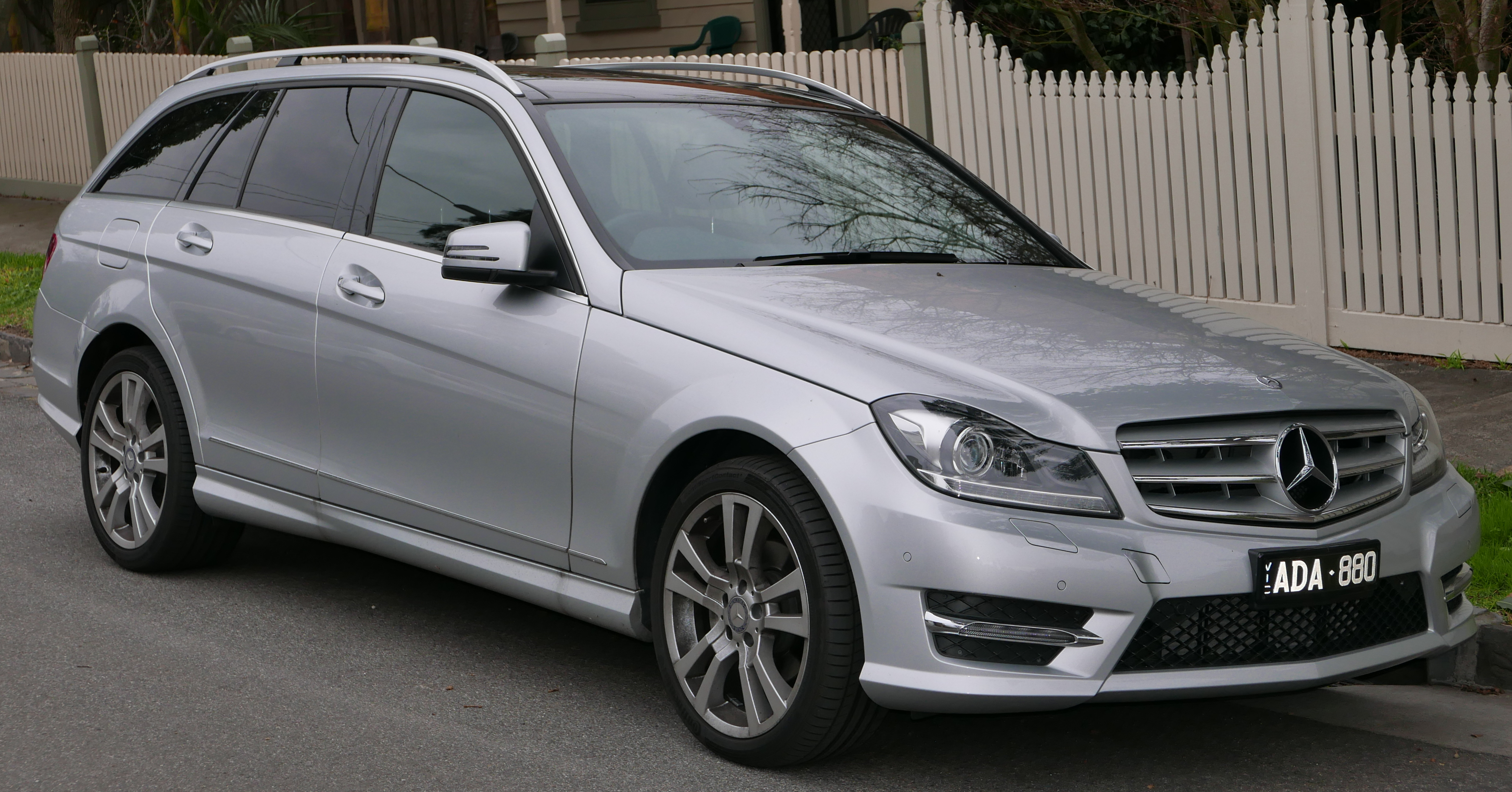
2014 Mercedes-Benz C Class station wagon

Germany is the largest market for station wagons in the world, with around 600,000 to 700,000 vehicles sold each year; amounting to 20% of all car sales. German-designed station wagons have been produced by Audi, BMW, Borgward, Mercedes-Benz, Opel, and Volkswagen. Some larger models are available with a third row of seats, such as the rear-facing jump seat for two passengers in the cargo area of the Mercedes-Benz E-Class wagon.

In 1961, Volkswagen introduced the two-door "Variant" body style of the Volkswagen Type 3 (also known as the Volkswagen 1500; later the Volkswagen 1600). The Type 3's rear-engine layout was retained for the station wagon models, but the engine profile was flattened, resulting in a small car with interior room and trunk space in the front. The model was offered through the 1973 model year.

Station wagons produced in East Germany include the 1956–1965 Wartburg 311/312/313, the 1963–1990 Trabant 601 Universal, and the 1966–1988 Wartburg 353 Tourist.

=== France ===
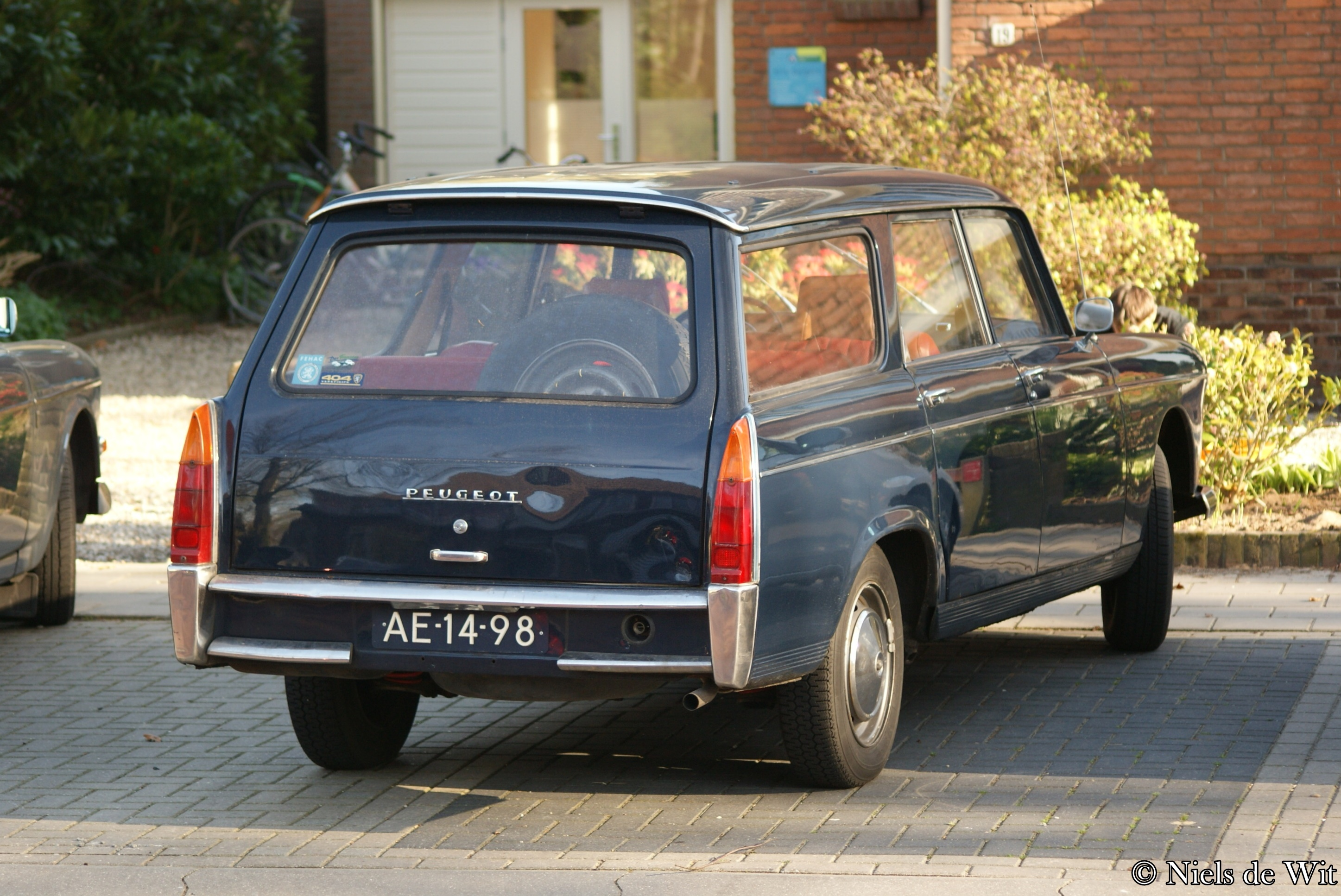
1963 Peugeot 404 Break

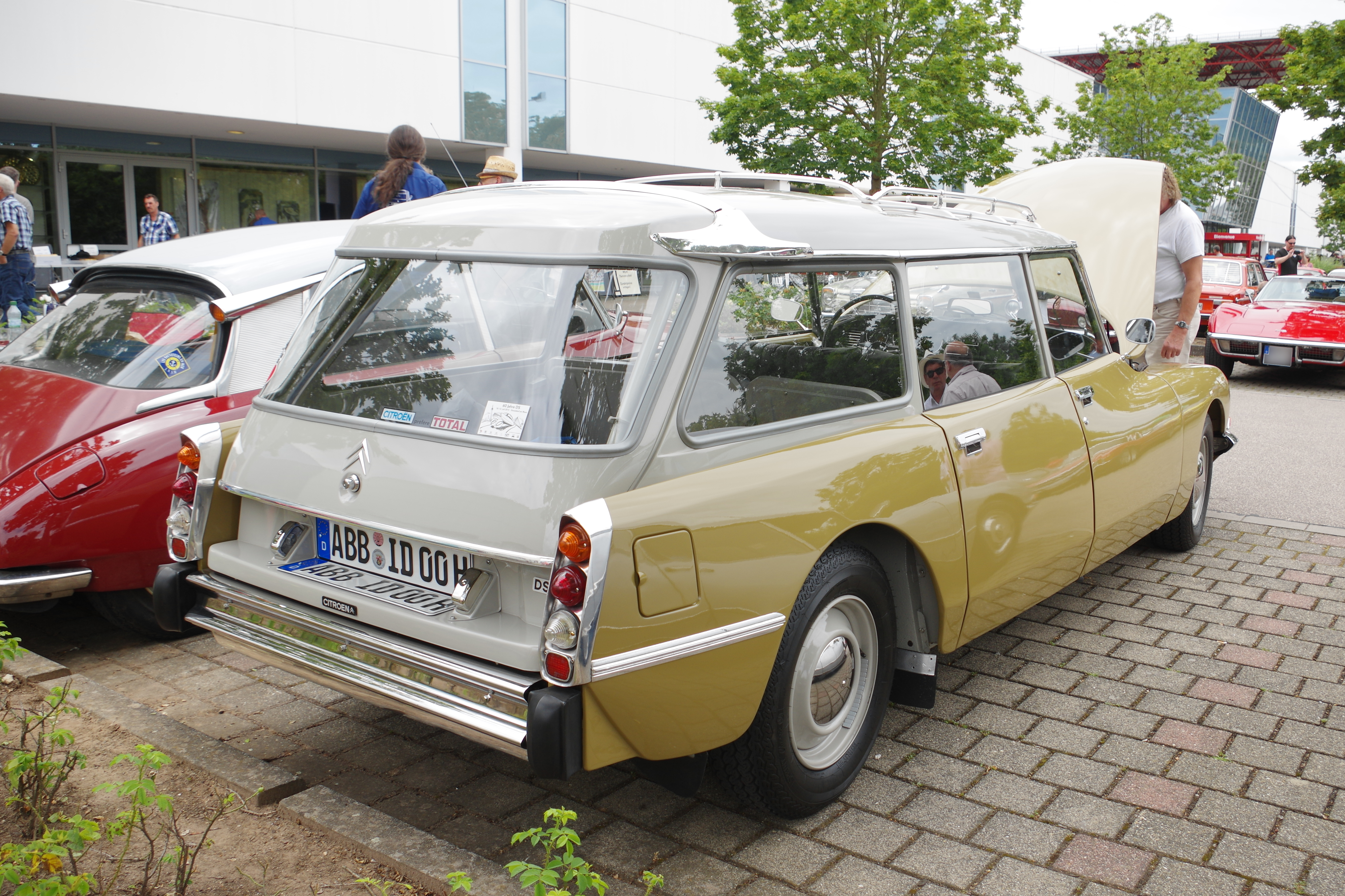
1972 Citroën DS Break

In France, almost all station wagon models are called a "Break".

The first station wagon produced by a French manufacturer was the Citroën Traction Avant Familiale model introduced in 1935. The first Peugeot station wagon was the Peugeot 203, introduced in 1950.

In 1958, the Citroën ID Break (known as the Safari in English-speaking countries) was introduced, larger than other French station wagon models and of similar size to contemporary full-size station wagons from the United States. It seated eight people, with two front-facing bench seats and two folding inward-facing seats in the cargo area. The 'Familiale' version had a front bench seat, a forward-facing three-space bench seat in the middle, and a folding forward-facing three-seat bench in the rear, providing a versatile nine-seat car. The Citroën ID also had a two-part tailgate and a hydropneumatic suspension that allowed a self-leveling ride height and automatic brake biasing regardless of the load carried. The car could also 'kneel' to the ground to facilitate loading heavy or large items. The successors to the ID, the Citroën CX and Citroën XM, continued to be among the largest station wagon cars produced in Europe. Nevertheless, the model was discontinued in 2000, and a station wagon version was unavailable for its Citroën C6 successor.

The Peugeot 404, introduced in 1960, offered a conventional large station wagon alternative to the innovative Citroëns. Its replacement, the 505 was available in both five-seat and seven-seat 'Familiale' versions. As with the Citroëns, changing demands in the French car market led to the end of the large Peugeot station wagon models in the mid-1990s, with the smaller Peugeot 406 becoming the largest station wagon model in the range from 1995. Similarly to the United States, the decline of traditional Break and Familiale models in France was partly due to the introduction of the minivan in the form of the Renault Espace in 1984.

=== Sweden ===
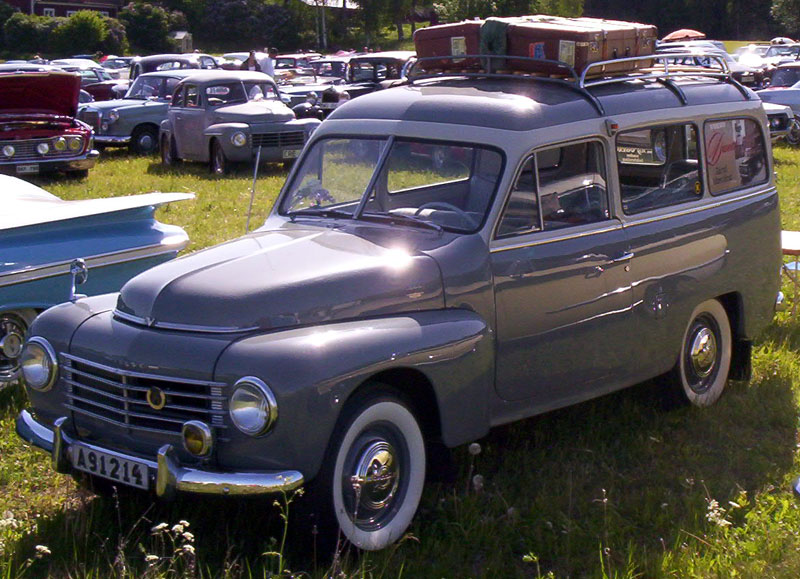
Volvo Duett

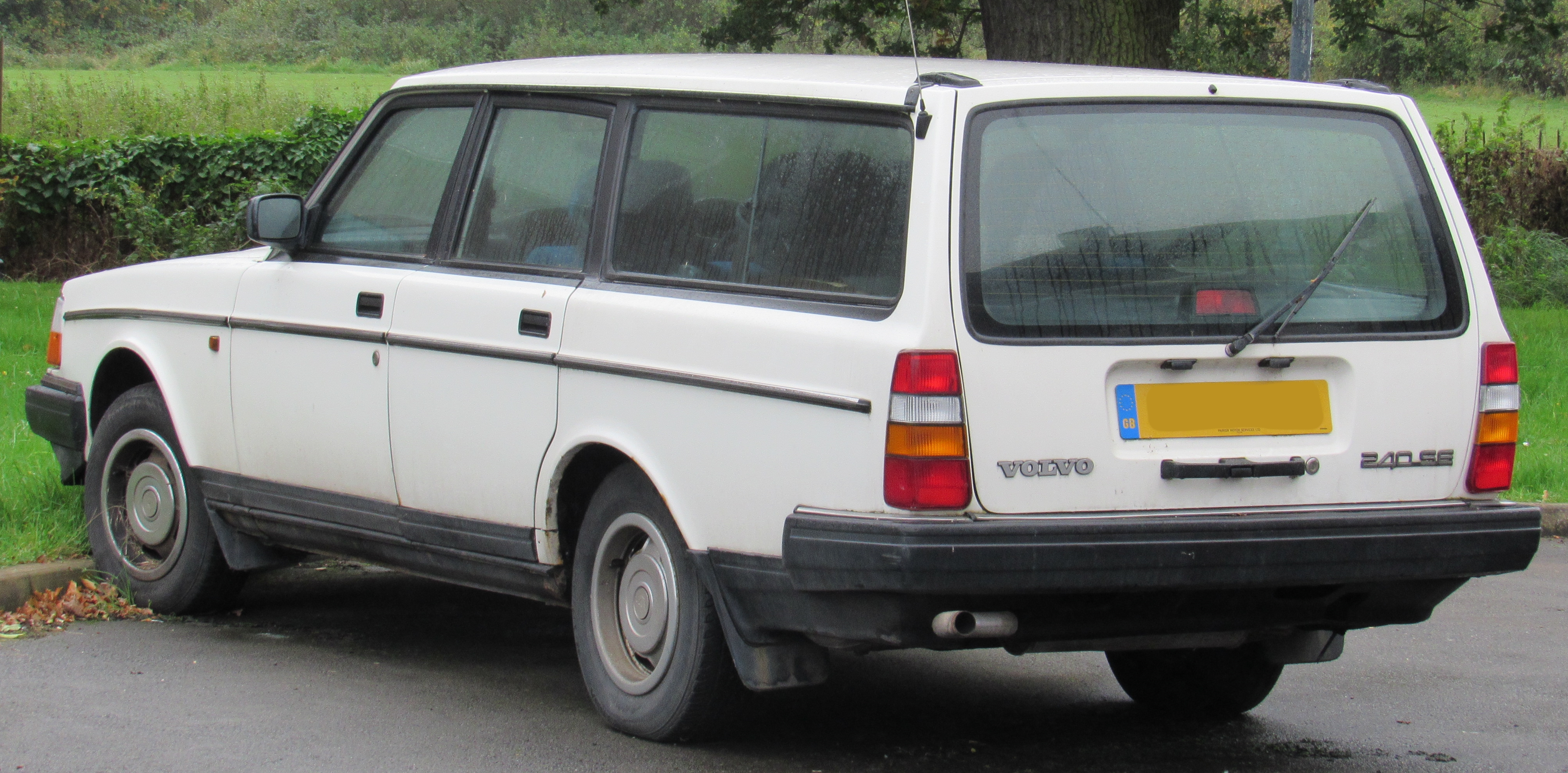
1974–1993 Volvo 240 wagon

The first station wagon produced in Sweden was the Volvo Duett, introduced in 1953. The Duett two-door wagon was conceived as a dual-function delivery van and people-carrier and is based on the chassis of the PV444 and PV544 sedans.

In 1962, the Volvo Duett was supplemented by a larger but lower Amazon, which has a four-door body and a horizontal split tailgate. Volvo continued production of station wagons through the Volvo 145 (introduced in 1967), then the Volvo 200 Series (introduced in 1974), and the Volvo 700 Series (introduced in 1985). In many markets, the station wagon models of the 700 Series significantly outsold the sedan models. In 1990, the 700 Series was replaced by the Volvo 900 Series, which was sold alongside the smaller Volvo 850 wagon that was introduced one year later. The 900 Series ended production in 1998, and its successor (the Volvo S80) did not include any wagon models. Volvo station wagons produced since the mid-1990s are the Volvo V40, Volvo V50, Volvo V60, Volvo V70, and Volvo V90, with the V60 and V90 models currently in production.

Saab began producing station wagons in 1959, with the Saab 95 two-door wagon, based on the Saab 93 sedan. Following a hiatus in station wagon production since the Saab 95 ended production in 1978, in 1997 the company introduced the four-door Saab 9-5 station wagon, produced until 2010. In 2005 a 'Sportwagon' version of the Saab 9-3 was introduced and produced until 2011.

In 2017 station wagons accounted for 31% of all sold cars.

=== Switzerland ===
In 1983, station wagons represented 15% of the passenger car market, reflecting a trend throughout Europe of increasing popularity through the 1980s, with the vehicles becoming less cargo-oriented.

=== Japan ===
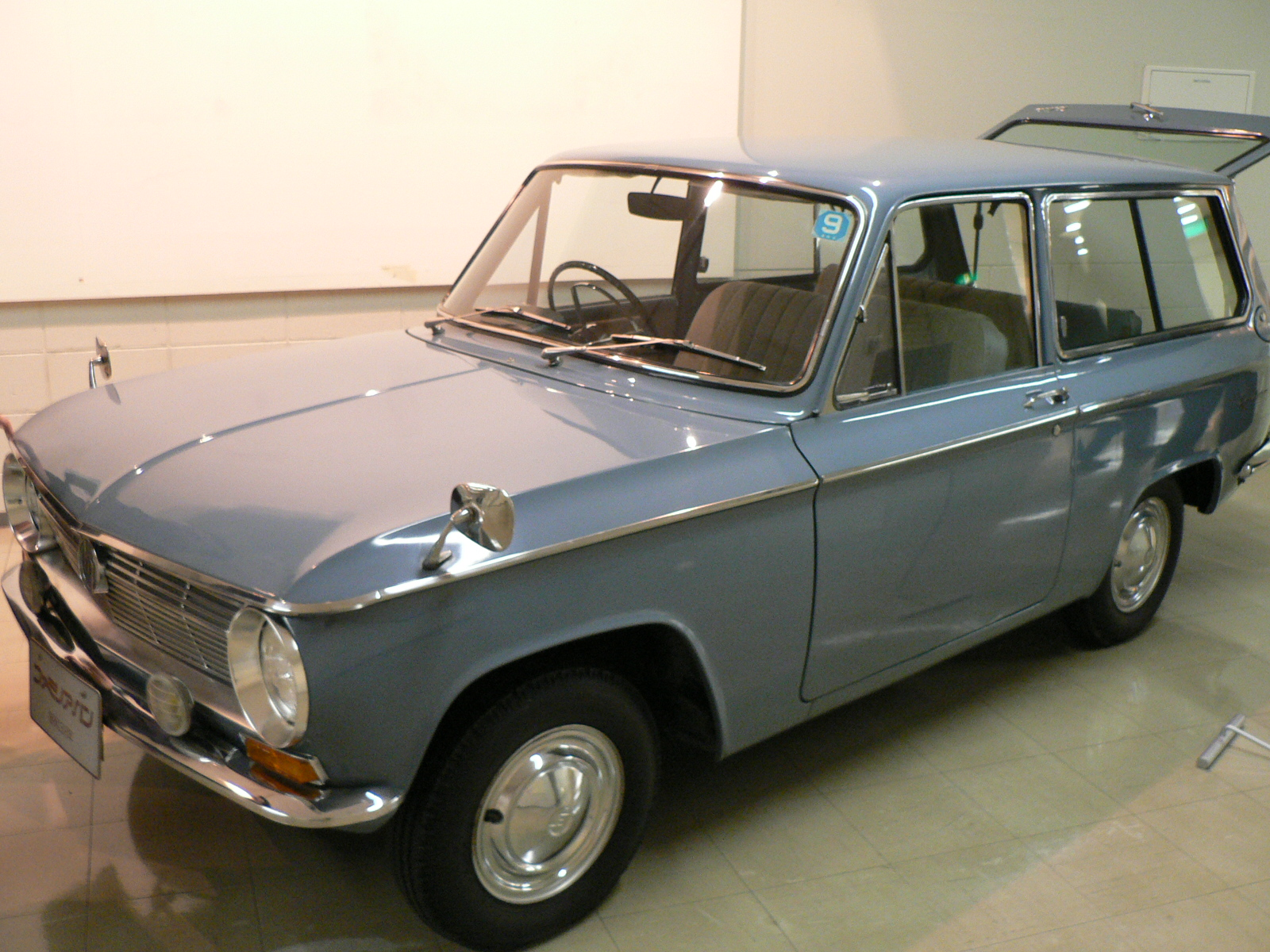
1963–1968 Mazda Familia

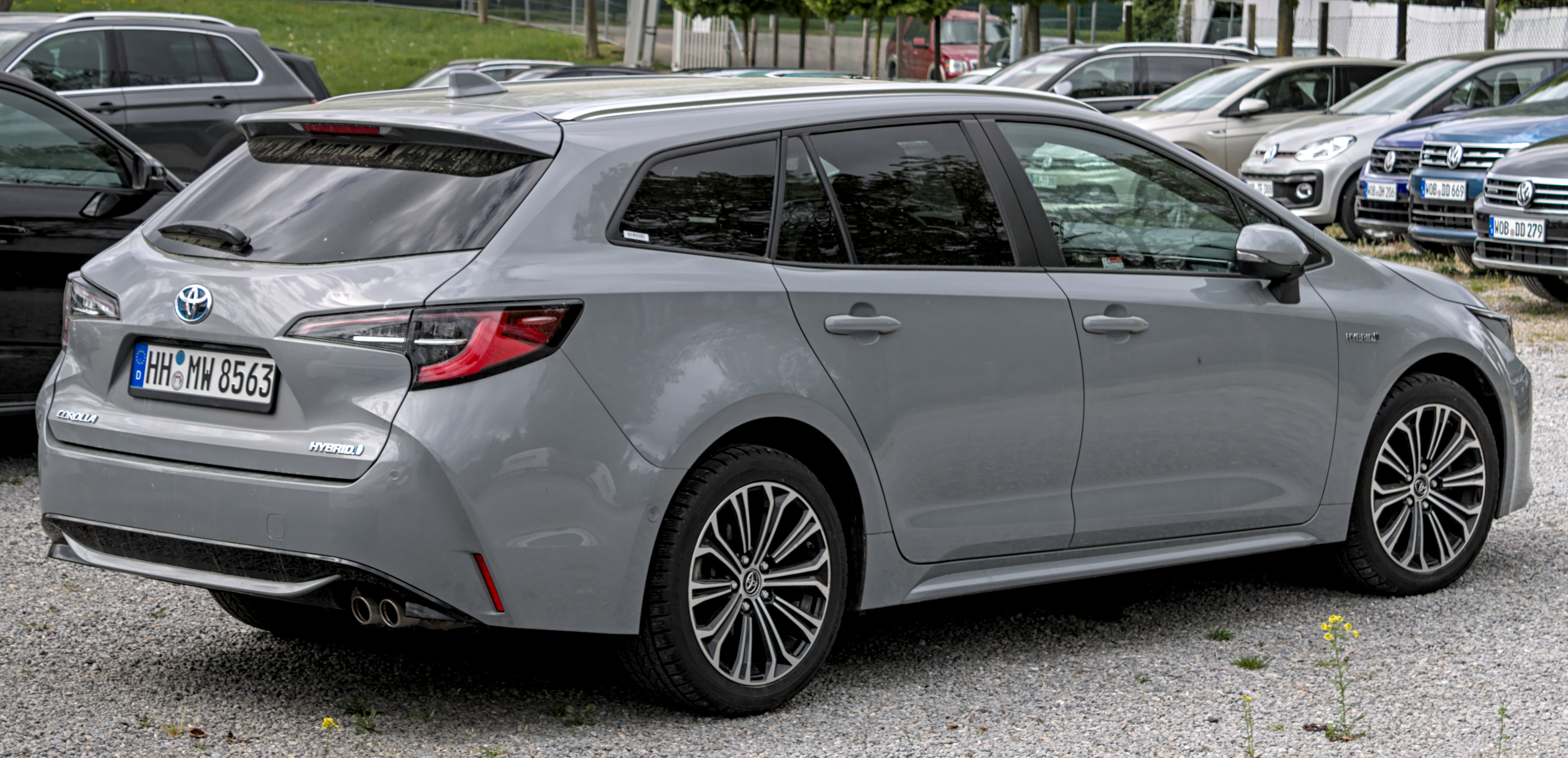
2019 Toyota Corolla Touring Sports

The first Japanese station wagon was the 1961 Isuzu Bellel four-door wagon, based on a compact sedan chassis. This was followed by the 1963 Mazda Familia, 1966 Toyota Corolla, 1967 Isuzu Florian, 1969 Mitsubishi Galant, 1973 Mitsubishi Lancer and 1974 Honda Civic wagons. However, Japanese manufacturers did not build station wagons in large volumes until the 1980s when the body style, along with SUVs and minivans, boomed in popularity as leisure vehicles.

Models marketed as passenger station wagons in export markets were often sold as utilitarian "van" models in the home market. Some were not updated in a model's life in Japan for consecutive generations. For example, a sedan might have a model life of four years, but the wagon was not updated for up to eight years (such as the Toyota Corolla wagon built from 1979 until 1987 and the 1987–1996 Mazda Capella wagon). Station wagons remain popular in Japan, although they are in slow decline as the SUVs and minivans have taken over a large portion of this market since the 2000s, with manufacturers replacing their station wagons with equivalent hatchbacks or crossover SUVs (i.e., Subaru replaced the wagon with the hatchback for their third-generation Impreza range). Several Japanese compact MPVs such as Subaru Exiga and Toyota Prius α take elements from older station wagons while being more in line with their corresponding category.

=== Korea ===
South Korean manufacturers do not have a strong tradition of producing station wagons. The first station wagon by the South Korean manufacturer was released in 1995 as the Hyundai Avante Touring (Lantra Sportswagon), followed in early 1996 as the Kia Pride station wagon. Daewoo Motors followed a year later with the first-generation Nubira.

South Korean manufacturer Kia produces both the Cee'd and Optima station wagons designated as Sportswagons with sister company Hyundai offering station wagon versions of the i30 and i40.

=== Australia ===
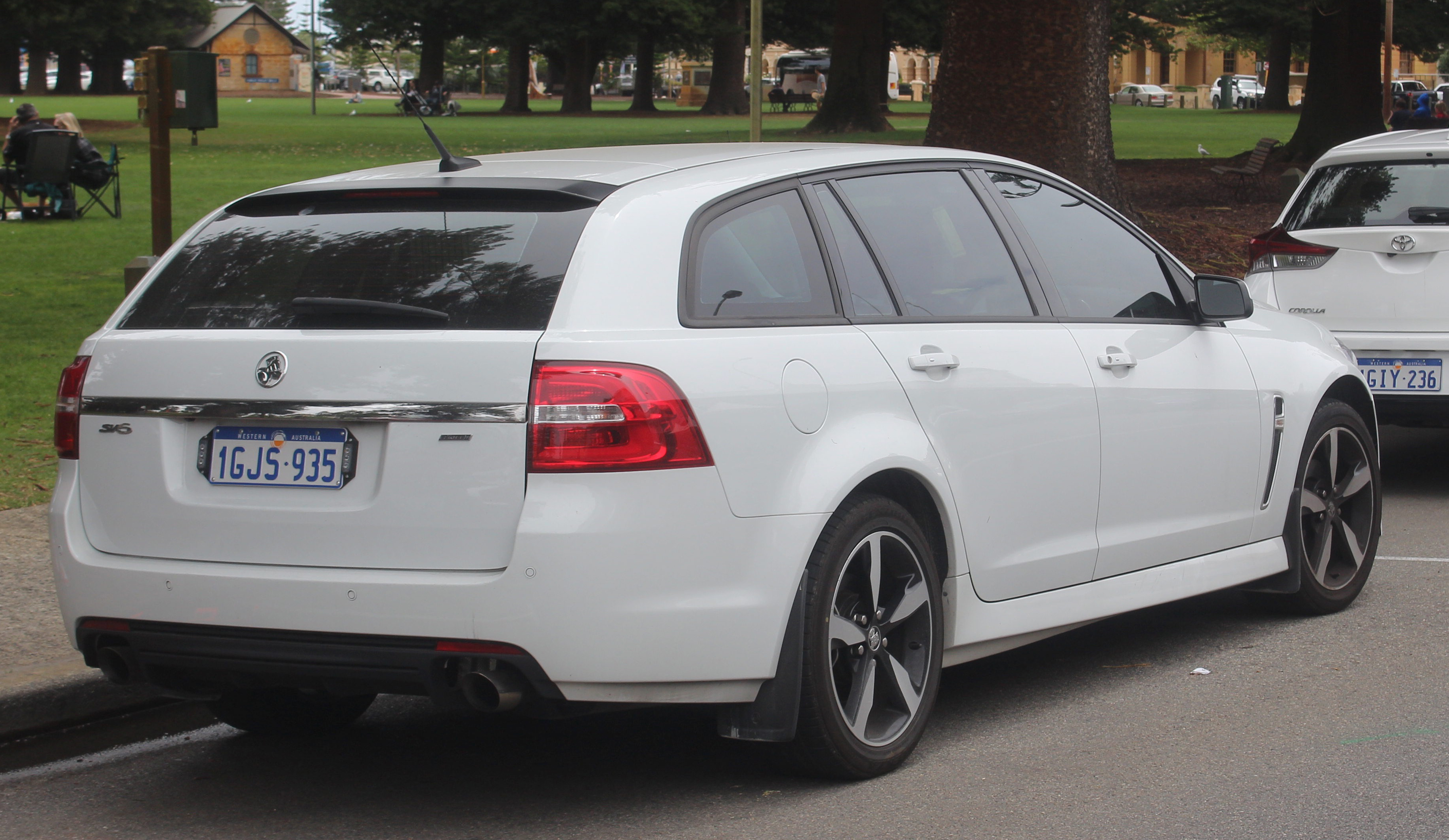
2017 Holden Commodore (VF) Sportwagon

The first Australian-designed car was built in 1948, but locally designed station wagons did not appear until nine years later when the 1957 Holden FE was introduced. Holden's main competitor, the Ford Falcon (XK) introduced wagon models in 1960.

Ford and Holden produced wagon models based on each generation of their large sedans until 2010. Other wagons produced in Australia include the smaller Toyota Camry and Mitsubishi Magna. The Ford and Holden wagons were usually built on a longer wheelbase than their sedan counterparts until the introduction of the Holden Commodore (VE), which switched to sharing the sedan's wheelbase.

Ford ceased production of wagons in Australia when the Ford Falcon (BF) ended production in 2010, primarily due to the declining station wagon and large car market, but also following the 2004 introduction and sales success of the Ford Territory SUV. Production of wagons in Australia ceased in 2017 when the Holden Commodore (VF) ended production.

== See also ==
- Hearse
- Panel van
