= Buick Roadmaster =

Automobile

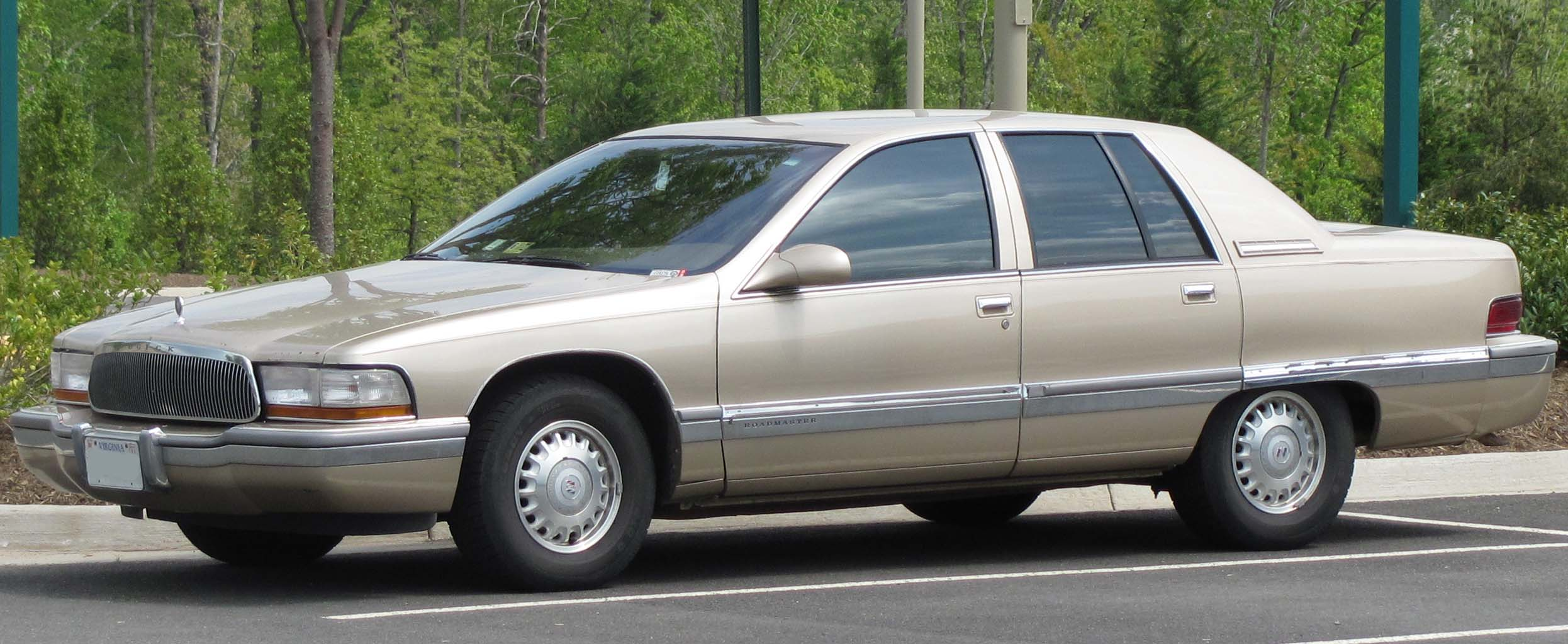

Overview
- Manufacturer: Buick (General Motors)
- Production: 1935–1942; 1946–1958; 1990–1996
- Model years: 1936–1942; 1946–1958; 1991–1996

Body and chassis
- Class: Full-size car
- Layout: FR layout

Chronology
- Predecessor: Buick Master Six

The Buick Roadmaster is an automobile built by Buick in three distinct periods: 1936 through 1942; 1946 through 1958; and 1991 through 1996. Roadmasters produced between 1936 and 1958 were built on Buick's longest non-limousine wheelbase and shared their basic structure with the entry-level Cadillac Series 65, the upscale Buick Limited, and, after 1940, the Oldsmobile 98. Between 1946 and 1957, the Roadmaster served as Buick's flagship.

After being resurrected in 1991, the Roadmaster became the marque's largest vehicle, measuring 10 in (254 mm) longer with a 5 in (127 mm) greater wheelbase than the C-body Buick Park Avenue. This generation was the first in Roadmaster history to be built on the General Motors B-body platform rather than the C-body, which up to 1984 had been reserved for GM's largest and most opulent models that were not Cadillacs.

A Buick Roadmaster Estate station wagon was introduced in 1947 and was manufactured in several generations through 1996. The final run of 1991-1996 Roadmasters shared powertrains and platforms with the Chevrolet Caprice, Cadillac Fleetwood, and Oldsmobile Custom Cruiser.

== 1931–1933 ==
Series 80
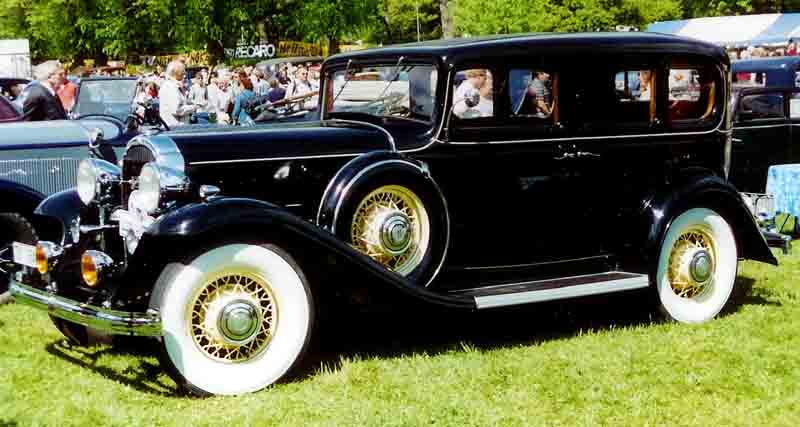
- 1932 Buick Series 80 Sedan

Overview
- Model years: 1931–1933
- Assembly: Flint, Michigan, United States
- Designer: Harley Earl

Body and chassis
- Class: luxury car
- Body style: 2-door coupe 2-door convertible 4-door phaeton 4-door sedan
- Layout: Front-engine, rear-wheel-drive
- Platform: GM C platform
- Related: Cadillac Series 355; Buick Series 90; LaSalle; McLaughlin-Buick

Powertrain
- Engine: 320.2 cu in (5.2 L) Buick Straight-8 engine OHV I8; 344.8 cu in (5.7 L) Buick Straight-8 engine OHV I8
- Transmission: 3-speed synchromesh manual

Dimensions
- Wheelbase: 124 in (3,150 mm); 126 in (3,200 mm); 130 in (3,302 mm)

The 1932 Series 80 was the first Buick with the 344.8 cu in (5,650 cc) OHV Buick Straight-8 engine developing 104 hp (78 kW; 105 PS) at 2,800 rpm. It was positioned as an upper category trim package and shared with the Series 90. The Series 80 was a new approach for Buick by marketing a luxury sedan with an eight-cylinder engine - that became expected from luxury brands - comparably as the Oldsmobile L-Series on the GM C platform. The 1932 models introduced a new high-performance engine developing 113 hp (84 kW; 115 PS). In 1933, the styling of all Buicks was updated with a new, corporate "streamlined" appearance shared with all GM cars for that year as influenced by GM's Art and Color Studio headed by Harley Earl.

The 1933 models were the first year all GM vehicles were installed with optional vent windows that were initially called "No Draft Individually Controlled Ventilation" that was later renamed "Ventiplanes" for which a patent application was filed on November 28, 1932. The patent was assigned to the Ternstedt Manufacturing Company, a GM subsidiary making components for Fisher Body.

At the end of 1933, the 80 series was discontinued after 24,117 units were produced. In 1936, the model changed its name to "Series 80 Roadmaster".

Body style choices were limited to a two-door coupe or four-door sedan in 1931 capable of seating five- or seven-passengers, then replacing the coupe with a Victoria five-passenger coupe in 1932. The 1933 model year saw convertibles for both the coupe and four-door sedan convertible reviving the "phaeton" nameplate again, and additional manufacturing locations opened across the country under the Buick-Oldsmobile-Pontiac Assembly Division. The equipment levels and refinement of materials used were on par with the top-level Limited and was a contender with the Packard Eight.

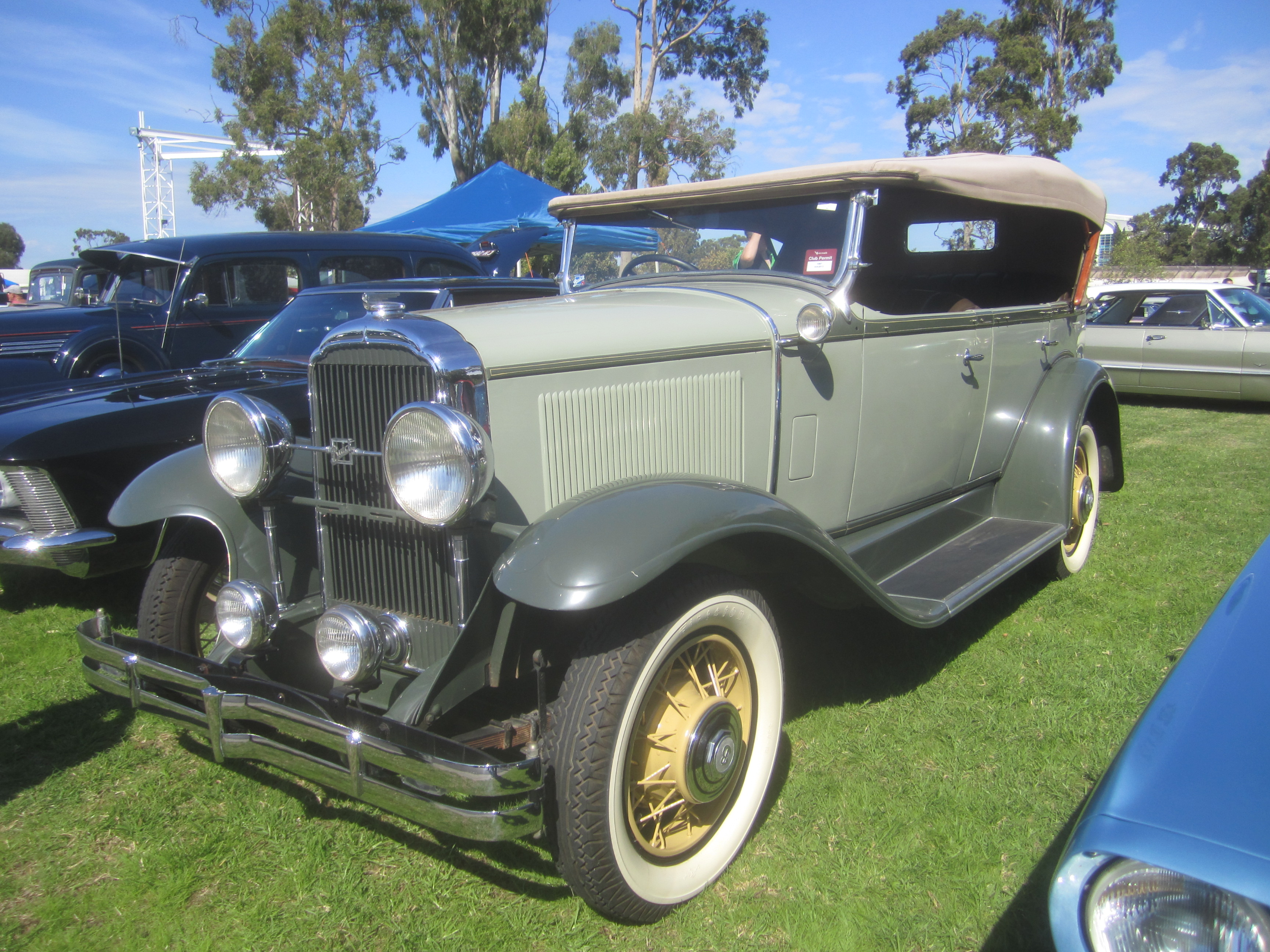
1931 Buick Series 80 Touring Sedan

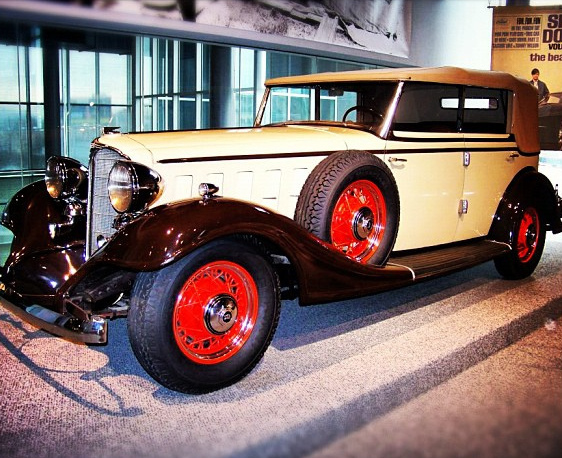
1933 Buick Series 80 Touring Sedan

== 1936–1937 ==
First generation
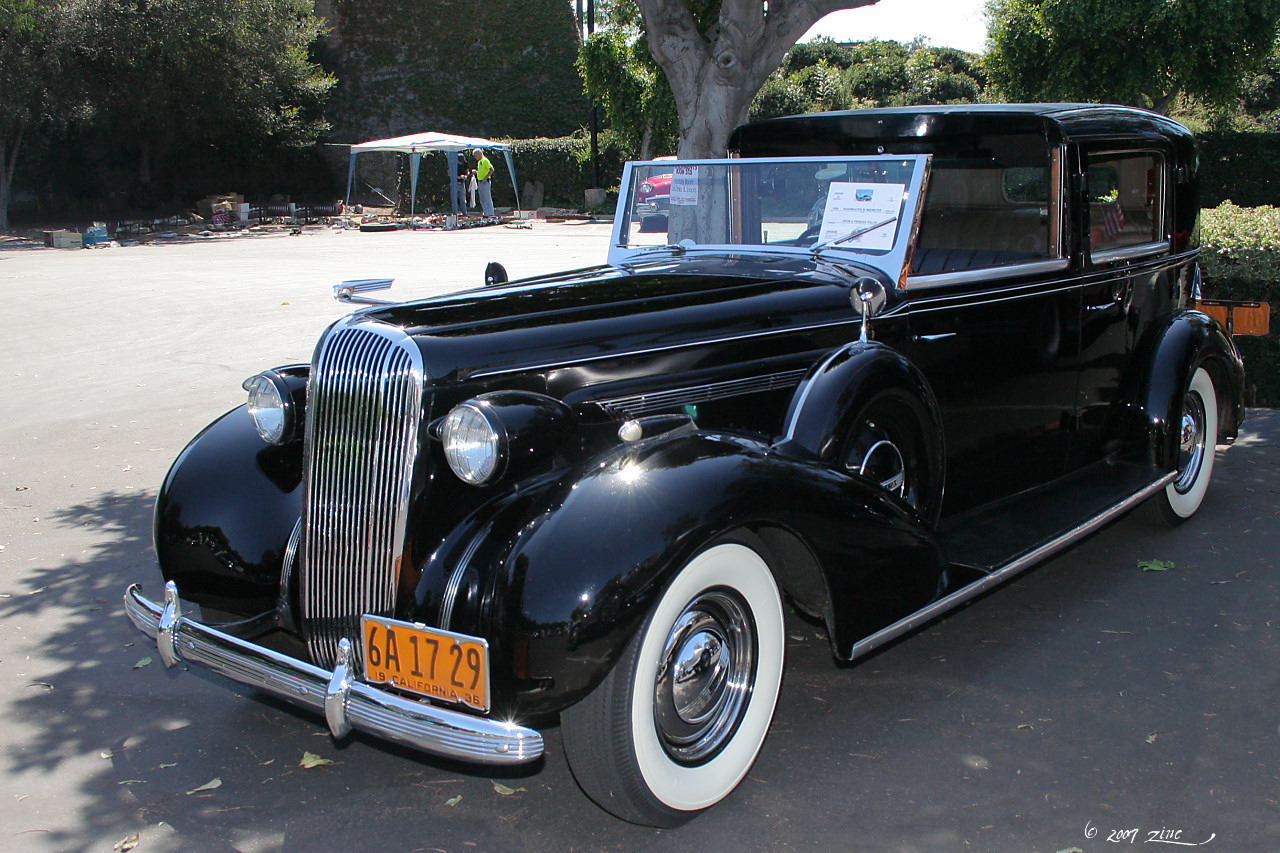
- 1936 Buick Roadmaster Series 80 Town Car by Brewster

Overview
- Model years: 1936–1937
- Assembly: South Gate, California, US; Flint, Michigan, US; Linden, New Jersey, US; GM Osaka Assembly, Osaka, Japan
- Designer: Harley Earl

Body and chassis
- Body style: 4-door sedan 4-door convertible
- Platform: C-body
- Related: Cadillac Series 80; Cadillac Series 70; Cadillac Series 65; Buick Limited; Oldsmobile L-Series; LaSalle; McLaughlin-Buick

Powertrain
- Engine: 320 cu in (5.2 L) Fireball I8
- Transmission: 3-speed sliding shift manual

Dimensions
- Wheelbase: 131.0 in (3,327 mm)
- Length: 210.3 in (5,342 mm)
- Width: 75.0 in (1,905 mm)
- Height: 1936: 69.5 in (1,765 mm); 1937: 68.0 in (1,727 mm)
- Curb weight: 4,300–4,500 lb (1,950–2,040 kg)

The origins of the Roadmaster name date to 1936, when Buick added names to its entire model lineup to celebrate the engineering improvements and design advancements over their 1935 models. Buick's Series 40 was named the Special, the Series 50 became the Super, the Series 60 was named the Century and the Series 90 — Buick's largest and most luxurious vehicle — was named the Limited. The Series 50 was retired, but new for the model year was the Series 80 Roadmaster. The 1936 Buick sales brochure describes, "It literally named itself the first time a test model leveled out on the open highway." The terminology "Series 60" and "Series 70" were shared with Cadillac, while "Series 60", "Series 70", "Series 80", and "Series 90" were shared with Oldsmobile.

The Roadmaster was introduced in a year when Buick's overhead valve straight-eight engines were heavily revised. Buick reduced the number of engines from four sizes to two: a 233 cu in (3.8 L), 93 hp (69 kW; 94 PS) version for the Special, and a 320.2 cu in (5.2 L), 130 hp (97 kW; 132 PS) at 3100 r.p.m engine for the other series. Buick also adopted an all-steel "turret top" and hydraulic brakes. Coil springs were used in the front.

The Roadmaster sedan weighed 4,098 pounds, about 88 pounds more than Cadillac's new Series 60. The sedan sold for $1,255 ($29,118 in 2025 dollars), $440 ($10,209 in 2025 dollars) less than the least expensive Cadillac. The only other body style was a four-door convertible phaeton, priced at $1,565 ($36,310 in 2025 dollars) (a total of 1,064 were produced), at a time when a Cadillac in the same body style sold was priced from $2,745 ($63,688 in 2025 dollars). Buick sales went from just over 48,000 to nearly 158,000, with the new Series 80 Roadmaster contributing 16,049 units to that total.

Buick was the only GM car, along with the Chevrolet Standard, to retain the basic 1934 styling for 1935, thus the 1936 re-style brought Buick up with the rest of the GM marques. For the 1937 model year, Buick moved to newly re-styled bodies along with all other GM cars. The Roadmaster gained a divided grille with horizontal bars. The center section of the grille was painted to match the body of the car. Fenders became squared off and the headlight shells were streamlined. Overall height was reduced by 1.5 in (38 mm) while keeping the same interior space.

A new carburetor and revised camshaft raised the engine rating to 130 hp (97 kW; 132 PS). The engine also received a new intake manifold, oil pump, cooling system, and a quieter overhead valve mechanism.

A Formal Sedan, featuring a roll-down glass partition between the front and rear compartments, was added to the Roadmaster line for US$1,641 ($36,752 in 2025 dollars), of which 452 were sold. The price of the sedan was raised to US$1,518, and that of the phaeton to US$1,856 ($41,567 in 2025 dollars). Overall Roadmaster sales increased to 16,129.

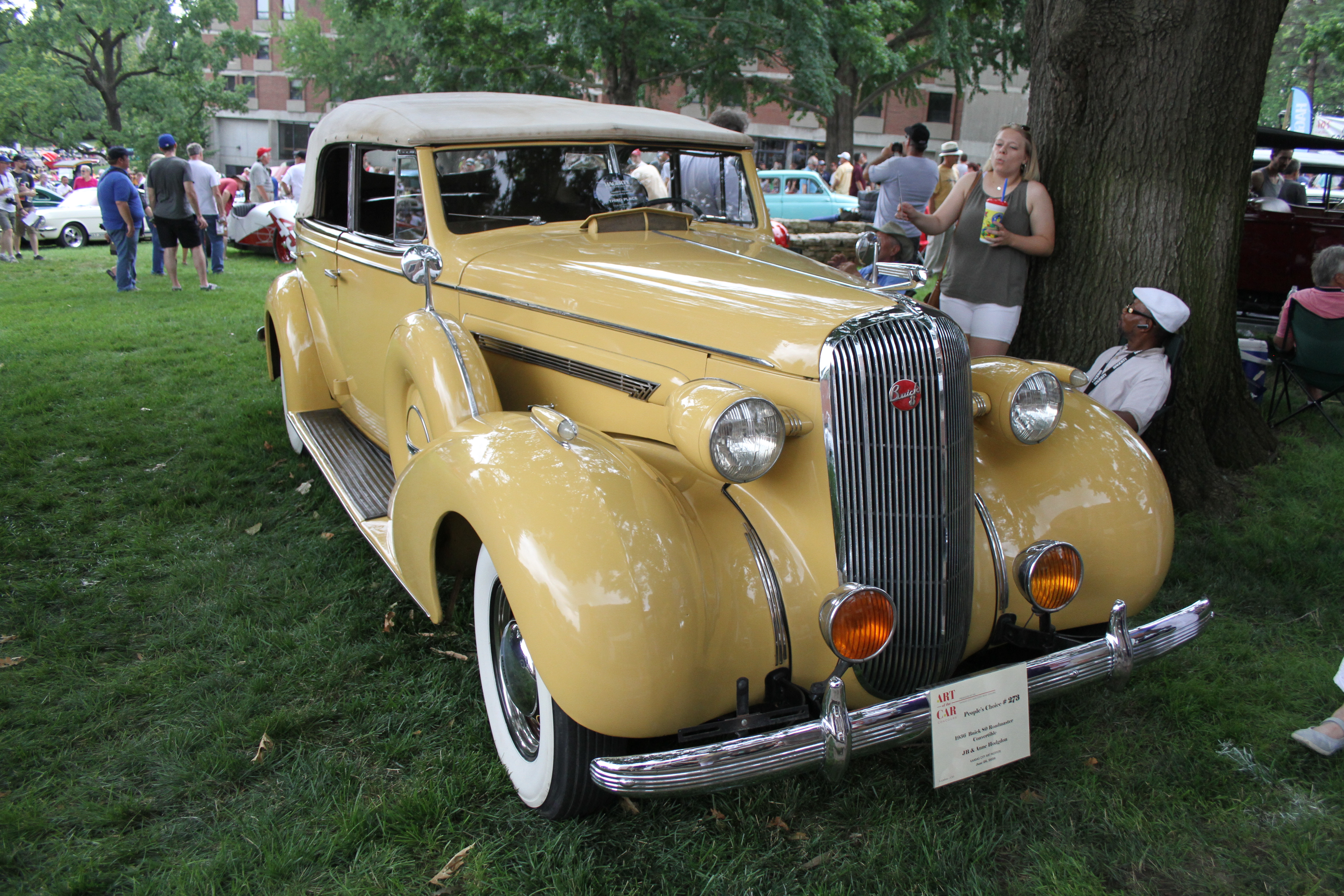
1936 Buick Roadmaster Series 80 Touring Sedan

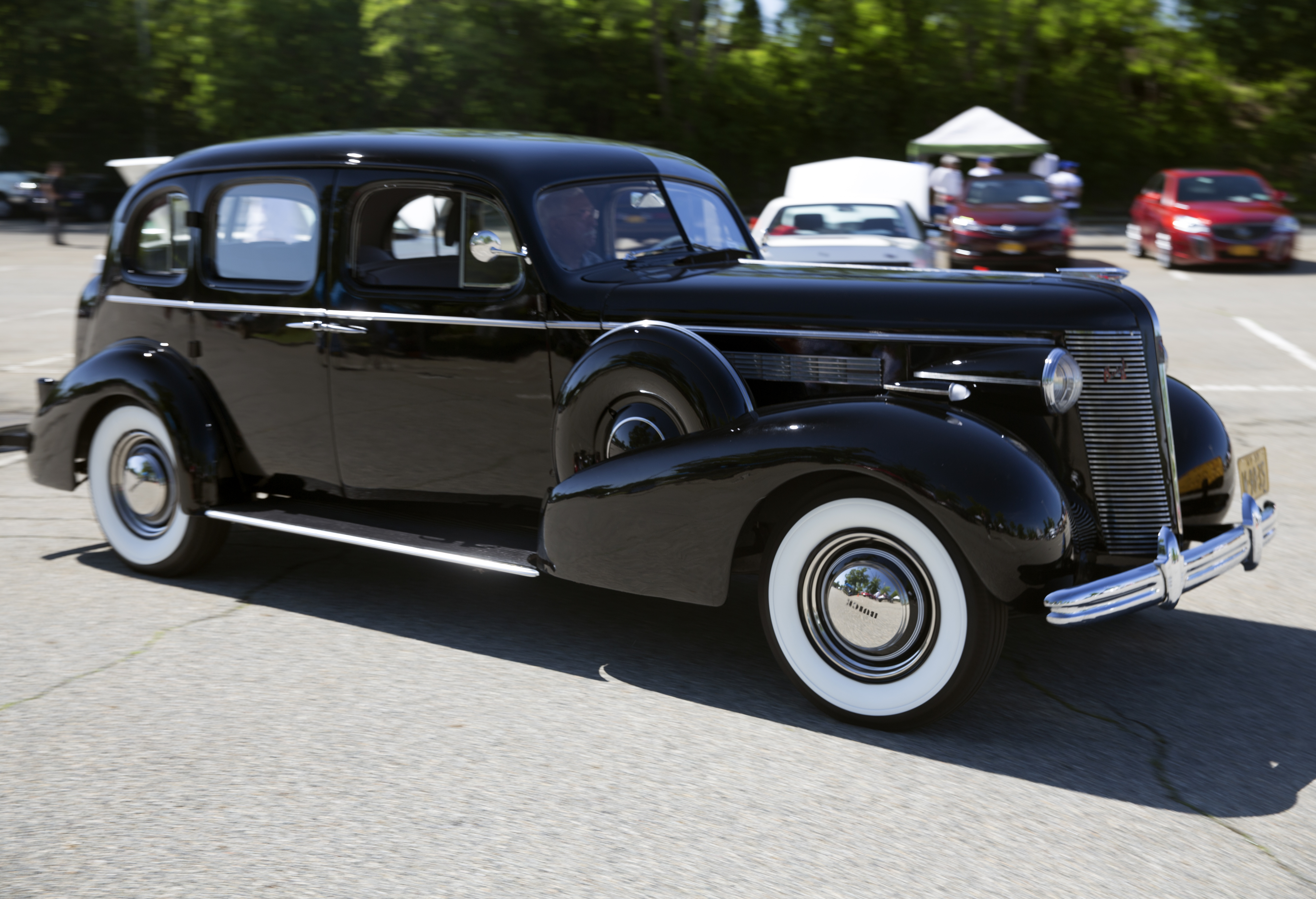
1937 Buick Roadmaster sedan

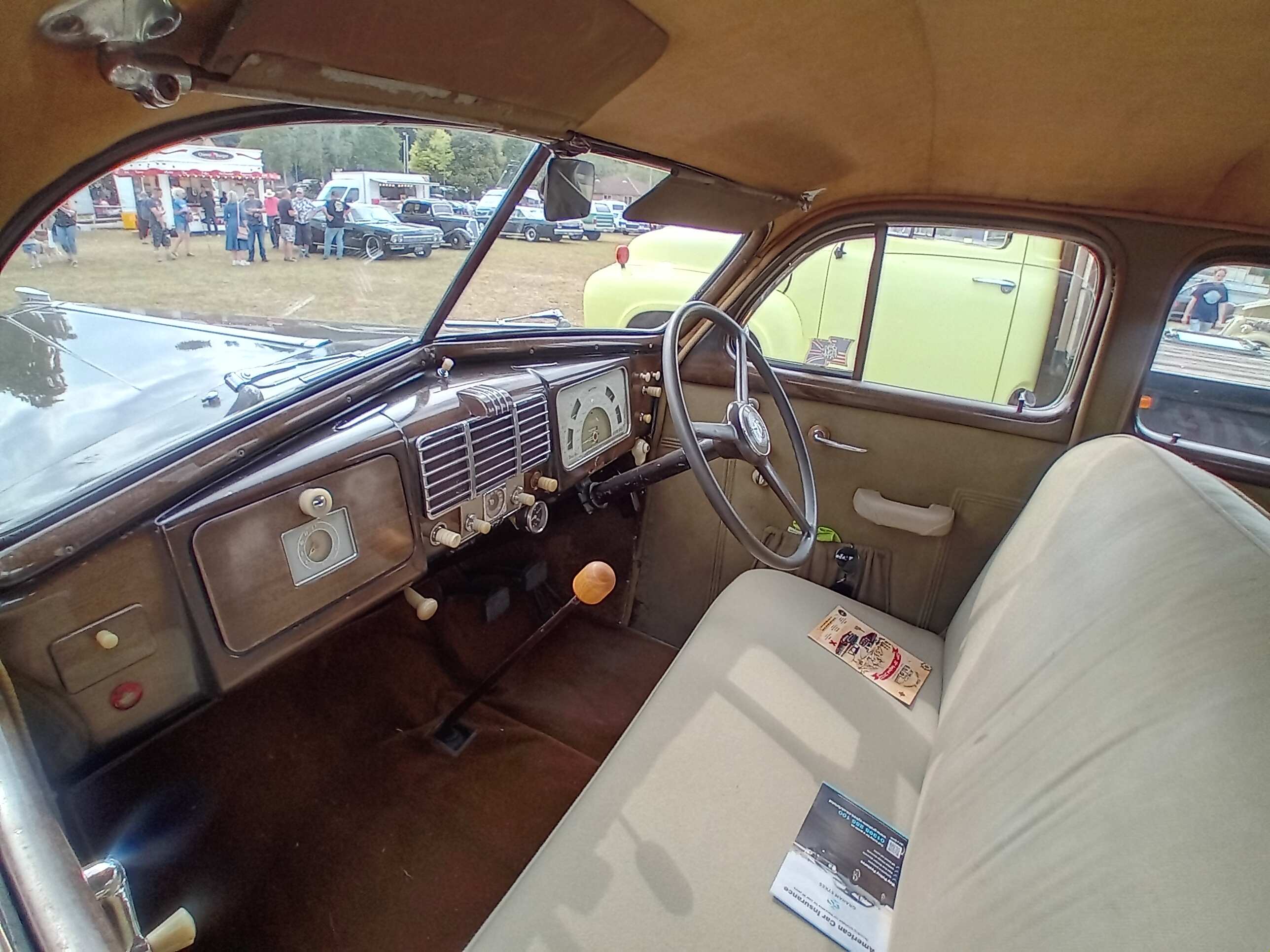
1937 Buick Roadmaster 4-door sedan interior

== 1938–1939 ==
Second generation
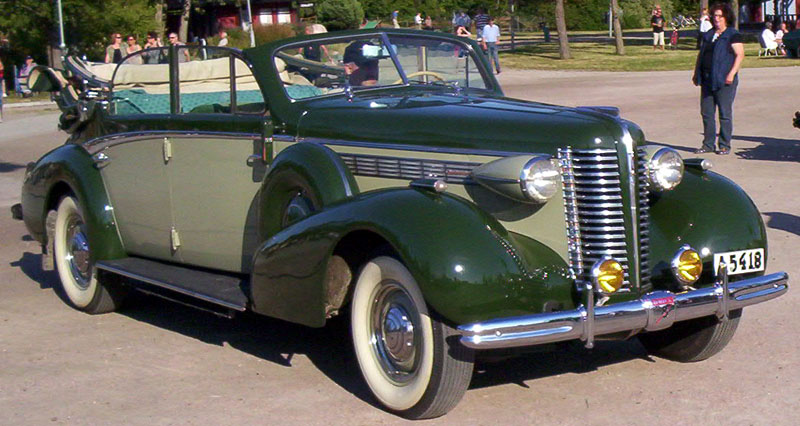
- 1938 Buick Roadmaster Convertible Sedan

Overview
- Model years: 1938–1939
- Assembly: South Gate, California, US; Flint, Michigan, US; Linden, New Jersey, US; GM Osaka Assembly, Osaka, Japan
- Designer: Harley Earl

Body and chassis
- Body style: 4-door sedan 4-door convertible
- Platform: C-body
- Related: Cadillac Series 65; Buick Limited; Oldsmobile L-Series; LaSalle

Powertrain
- Engine: 320 cu in (5.2 L) Fireball I8
- Transmission: 3-speed sliding shift manual

Dimensions
- Wheelbase: 133.0 in (3,378 mm)
- Length: 213.3 in (5,418 mm)
- Width: 75.5 in (1,918 mm)
- Height: 68.0 in (1,727 mm)
- Curb weight: 4,200–5,100 lb (1,900–2,300 kg)

Styling changes for 1938 were modest, with a longer hood extending to a now nearly vertical grille, taller bumper guards, and redesigned hubcaps. Changes were made to both engine and chassis. The ride was improved by replacing the rear leaf springs with coil springs and incorporating double-acting shock absorbers four times the size of others. The frame X-member was changed from I-beam to channel construction, and all wood structural elements were replaced with steel. The engine combustion chambers were redesigned and new "turbulator" pistons raised the compression ratio from 5.9 to 6.5:1, resulting in an increase to 141 hp (105 kW; 143 PS).

The four-door convertible phaeton changed from the built-in trunk design to a "fastback" rear appearance. The Limited continued to be offered, and a new fastback sedan was added to the line with 466 being sold. The Roadmaster sedan price was increased to US$1,645 ($37,625 in 2025 dollars). The overall automobile market decreased for the year, but Buick's share increased even with Roadmaster sales falling to 5,568 and now making up 3.3% of Buick's total output from its previous 7.3%.

Styling for 1939 featured a new two-piece “waterfall” grille with thin vertical bars. The hood was narrower, the front door pillars were narrower, and the hubcaps were larger. The window area increased substantially with the rear window changing to a one-piece design. All the significant gauges were relocated directly in front of the driver, and the gear shift was changed to a steering column mount. The four-door phaeton could now be ordered with the built-in trunk appearance or as a fastback, but only three of the latter were sold. Although prices were reduced to US$1,545 ($35,760 in 2025 dollars), sales only rose to 6,097, with Roadmaster's share of Buick's total sales falling to 2.9%.

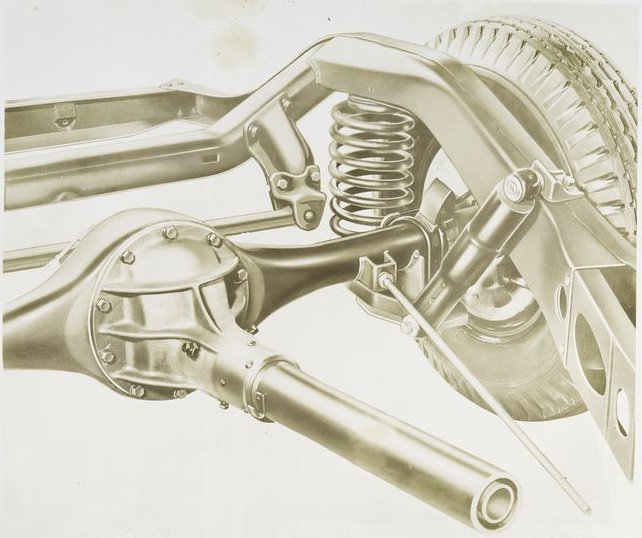
Spring and shock absorber mechanism on the rear wheels of the 1938 Buicks

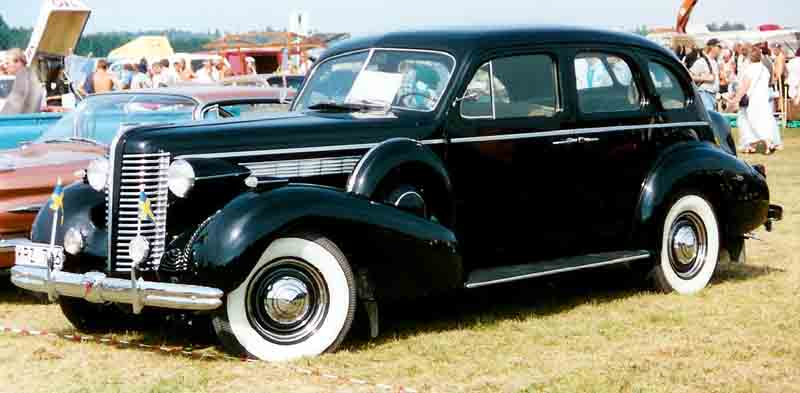
1938 Roadmaster Touring Sedan

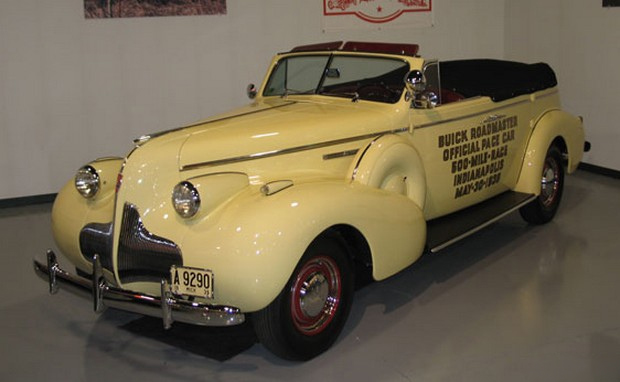
1939 Buick Roadmaster Convertible Sedan Indy 500 Pace Car

== 1940–1941 ==
Third generation
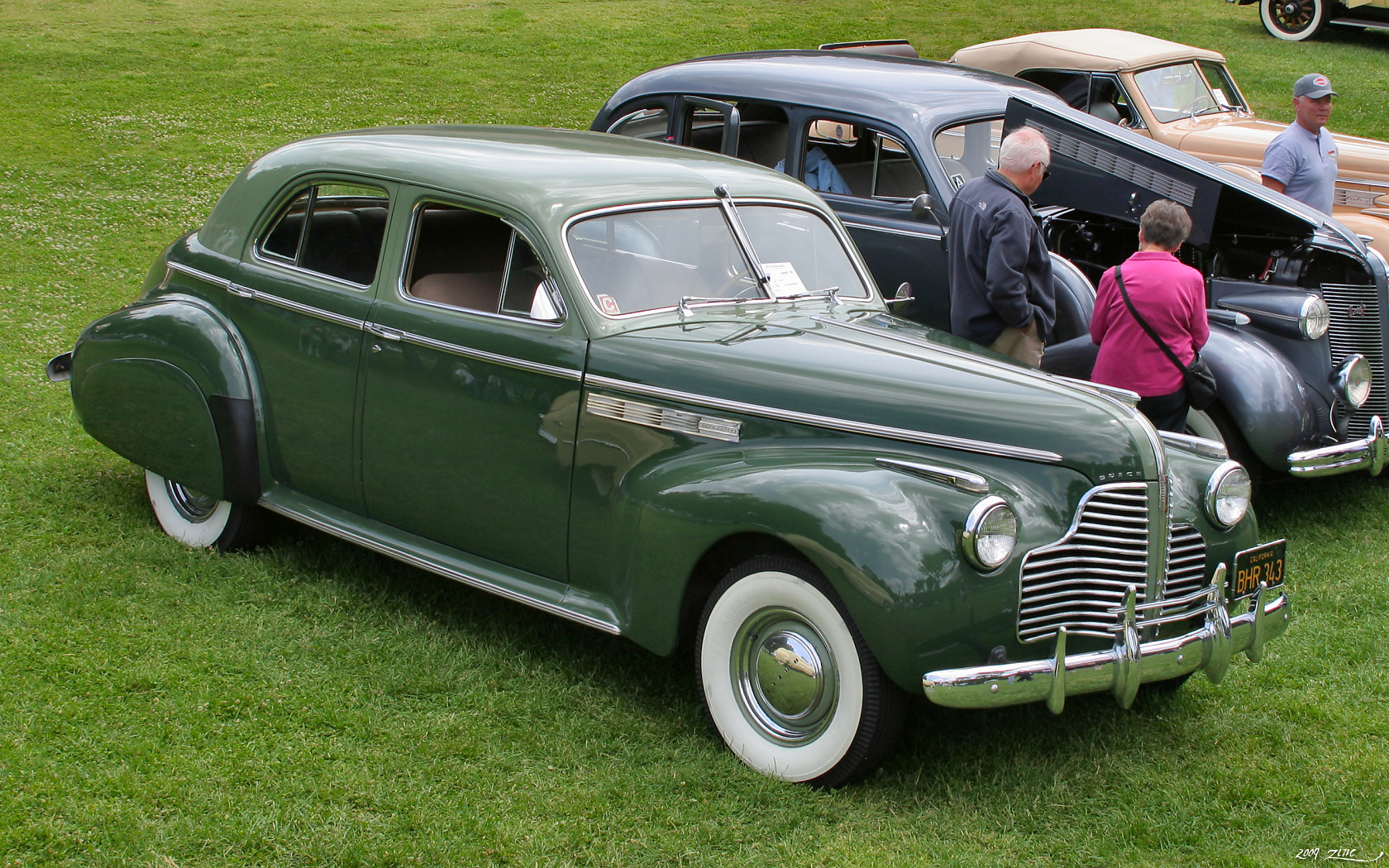
- 1940 Buick Roadmaster Model 71 Touring Sedan

Overview
- Model years: 1940–1941
- Assembly: South Gate, California, US; Flint, Michigan, US; Linden, New Jersey, US
- Designer: Harley Earl

Body and chassis
- Body style: 4-door sedan 4-door convertible 2-door coupe 2-door convertible
- Platform: C-body
- Related: Cadillac Series 62; LaSalle Series 52; Buick Super; Oldsmobile 96/98; Pontiac Torpedo

Powertrain
- Engine: 320 cu in (5.2 L) Fireball I8
- Transmission: 3-speed sliding shift manual

Dimensions
- Wheelbase: 126.0 in (3,200 mm)
- Length: 1940: 214.0 in (5,436 mm); 1941: 215.0 in (5,461 mm)
- Width: 1940: 75.8 in (1,925 mm); 1941: 76.5 in (1,943 mm)
- Height: 66.1 in (1,679 mm)
- Curb weight: 4,200–4,600 lb (1,900–2,100 kg)

In 1940, the Series 80 was renamed Buick Limited. The Roadmaster name was transferred to the new Series 70, which was introduced simultaneously as a brand new Series 50 Super. The Roadmaster featured a cutting-edge "torpedo" C-body. The new C-body that the 1940 Buick Roadmaster shared with the Super, the Cadillac Series 62, the Oldsmobile Series 90, and the Pontiac Torpedo featured shoulder and hip room that was over 5-inch (127 mm) wider, the elimination of running boards and exterior styling that was streamlined and 2-3" lower. When combined with a column-mounted shift lever the cars offered room for six-passengers.

The 1940 Roadmaster had a shorter wheelbase, weighed less, and was less expensive than the previous year's model. The formal and fastback sedans were discontinued. A two-door coupe body style was newly introduced, and 3,991 units were sold. The coach-building firm of Brunn designed several custom-bodied Buicks for the Series 70, 80, and 90. Only one Roadmaster example is known to have been produced in 1940, an open-front town car, that was dubbed "Townmaster". Overall sales more than tripled to 18,345.

Styling updates for 1941 were modest, but there were mechanical changes. The compression ratio was raised from 6.6:1 to 7.0:1, the "turbulator" pistons were redesigned, smaller spark plugs were new, and "Compound Carburetion" was introduced. This Compound Carburetion was the forerunner of the modern four-barrel carburetor and consisted of twin two-barrel carburetors. One unit operated all of the time, while the other operated only under hard acceleration. The new engine was rated at 165 hp (123 kW; 167 PS). This made it have five more horsepower than a senior Packard, 15 more than any Cadillac, and 25 more than the largest Chryslers, it was the most powerful engine available that year on an American car.

A new body style for this year was a two-door convertible, which sold 1,845 units. There was also a Brunn-designed convertible, but no orders materialized because of the $3,500 price ($76,612 in 2025 dollars). Overall, Roadmaster sales were 15,372.

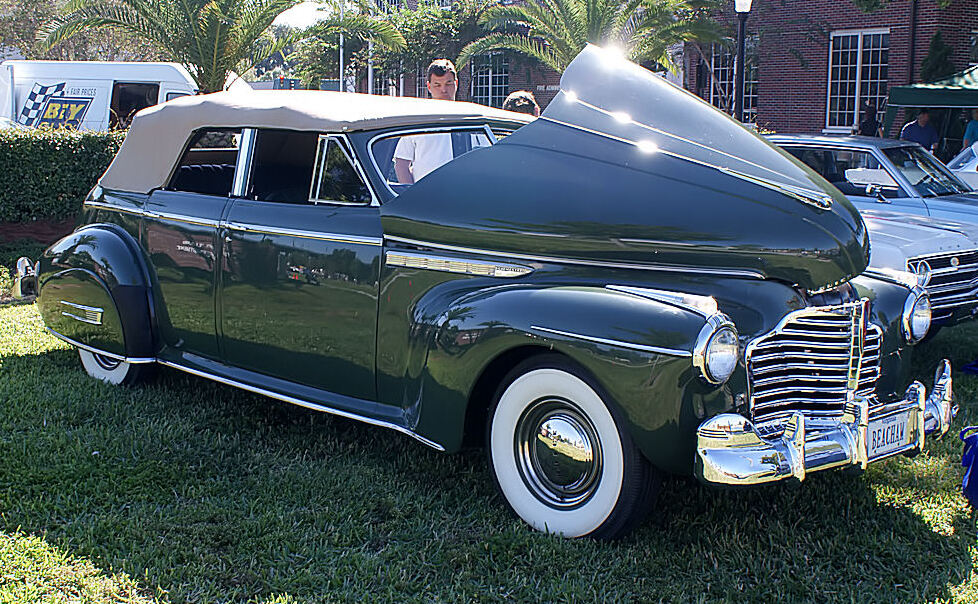
1941 Buick Roadmaster Series 70 Model 71C Phaeton

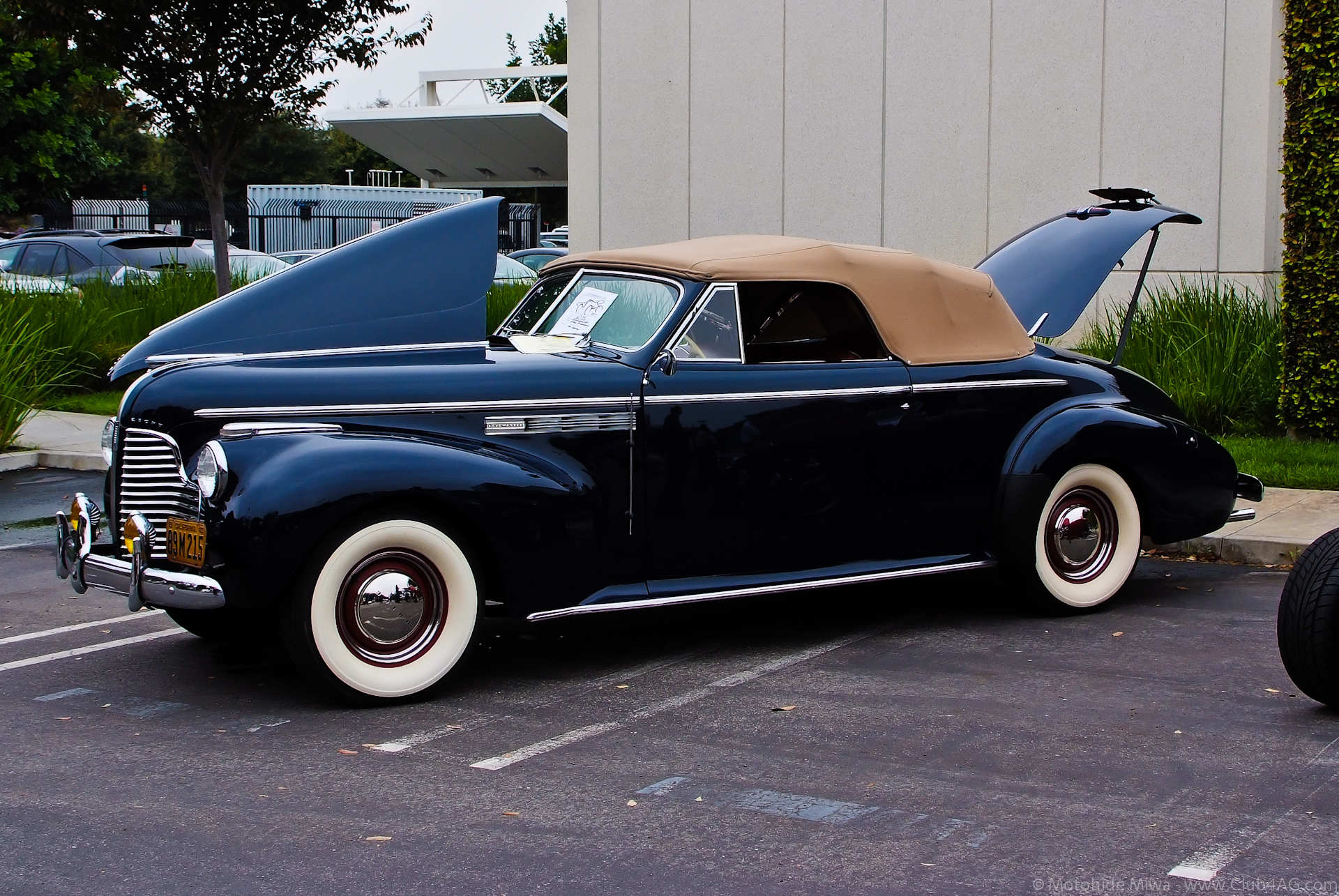
1941 Buick Roadmaster Model 76C Convertible

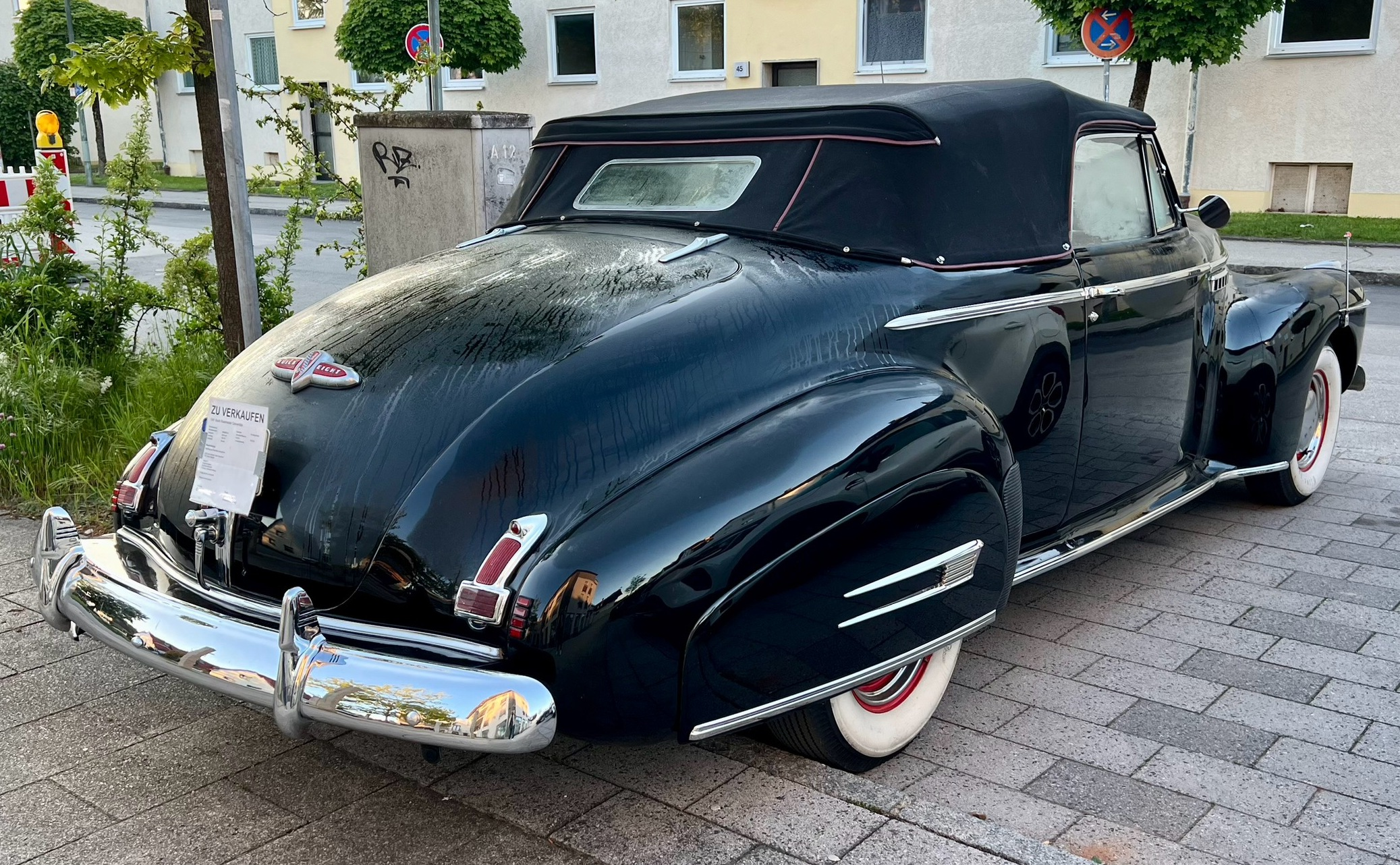
1941 Buick Roadmaster Convertible rear

== 1942, 1946–1948 ==
Fourth generation
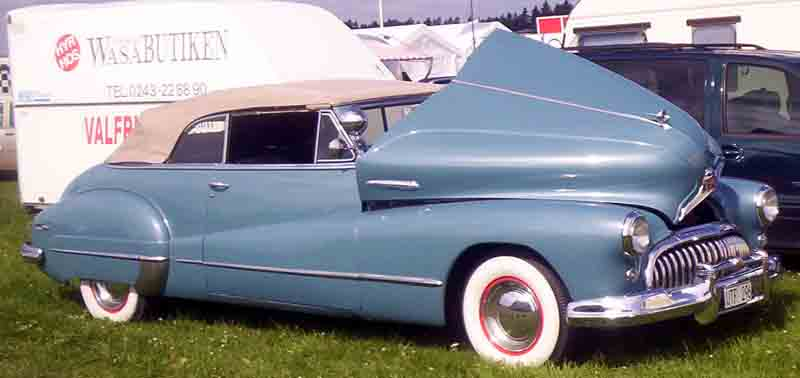
- 1947 Buick Roadmaster Convertible

Overview
- Model years: 1942, 1946–1948
- Assembly: Flint, Michigan, US (Buick City); Kansas City, Kansas, US (Fairfax Assembly); Linden, New Jersey, US (Linden Assembly); South Gate, California, US (South Gate Assembly); Wilmington, Delaware, US (Wilmington Assembly); Atlanta, Georgia, US
- Designer: Harley Earl

Body and chassis
- Body style: 4-door sedan 2-door Sedanet coupe 2-door convertible 4-door Estate wagon
- Platform: C-body
- Related: Cadillac Series 62; Buick Super; Oldsmobile 98

Powertrain
- Engine: 320 cu in (5.2 L) Fireball I8
- Transmission: 3-speed sliding shift manual 2-speed Dynaflow automatic

Dimensions
- Wheelbase: 129.0 in (3,277 mm)
- Length: 1942: 217.0 in (5,512 mm); 1946–47: 217.1 in (5,514 mm); 1948: 217.5 in (5,524 mm)
- Width: 78.6 in (1,996 mm)
- Height: 66.1 in (1,679 mm)
- Curb weight: 4,200–4,700 lb (1,900–2,100 kg)

The 1942 Roadmaster was longer, lower, wider, and roomier than before (a Harley Earl trademark), due in part to a longer wheelbase. There was also a new vertical-bar grille and "Airfoil" fenders that swept back to the rear fenders, which in subsequent generations became the chromed "Sweepspear". Both features became a Buick icon exhibited in one way or another for years to come, and were influenced by the concept car called the Buick Y-Job. The four-door phaeton was discontinued. Coupes adopted the Sedanet fastback style that was introduced in 1941 on the Century and Special. The new one-piece hood was double-hinged so that either side of the engine compartment could be opened, while in later updates, the hood would open at the front and extend up and towards the passenger compartment.

At the beginning of 1942, new automobiles were available only to those in occupations deemed essential to the war effort. By mid-January, cars with no exterior chrome trim apart from the bumpers were being produced. By February passenger car production was shut down completely. Despite the abbreviated model year, a total of about 8,400 were sold.

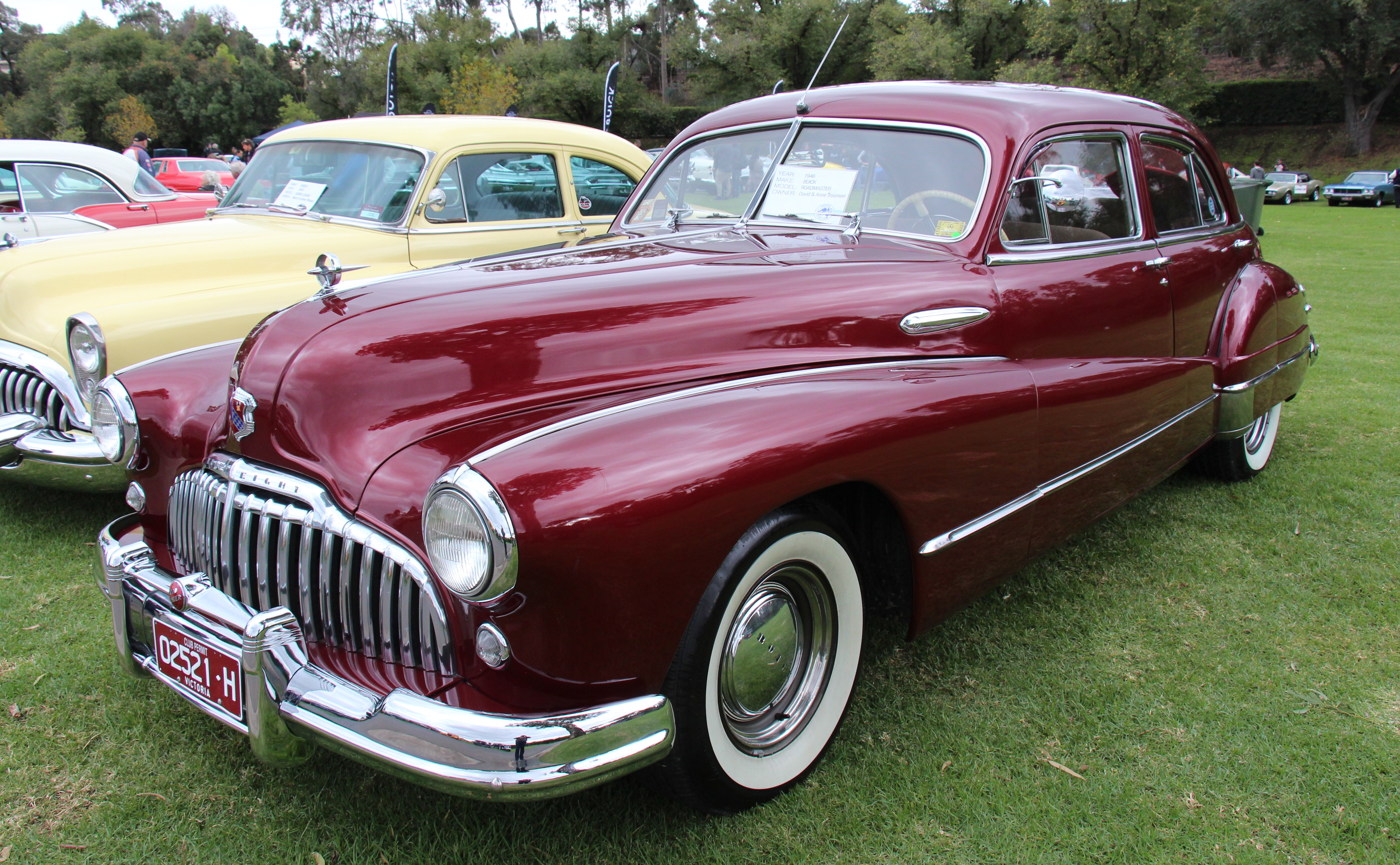
1946 Buick Roadmaster 4-door sedan

When postwar automobile production resumed in the 1946 model year, chrome was more sparingly applied, swept-back fenders were fitted to sedans and coupes, and a war-inspired "bombsight" hood ornament was adopted. The instrument panel was two-toned with woodgrain facings except on convertibles, which used body-colored panels. Series identification was found on cloisonne emblems centered in the bumper guard front and rear.

Compound Carburetion was discontinued, and the compression ratio was reduced to 6.60:1. The 1946 Roadmaster's horsepower rating went from 165 to 144. The torque rating was not affected. Nevertheless, The Roadmaster's I-8 still produced more horsepower than a top-of-the-line Chrysler's. Due to wartime inflation, prices were substantially higher than pre-war models. The most significant change was in sales proportions. Roadmaster increased its share of Buick sales from 4% in 1941 to 20% in 1946, with a total of about 31,400 sold.

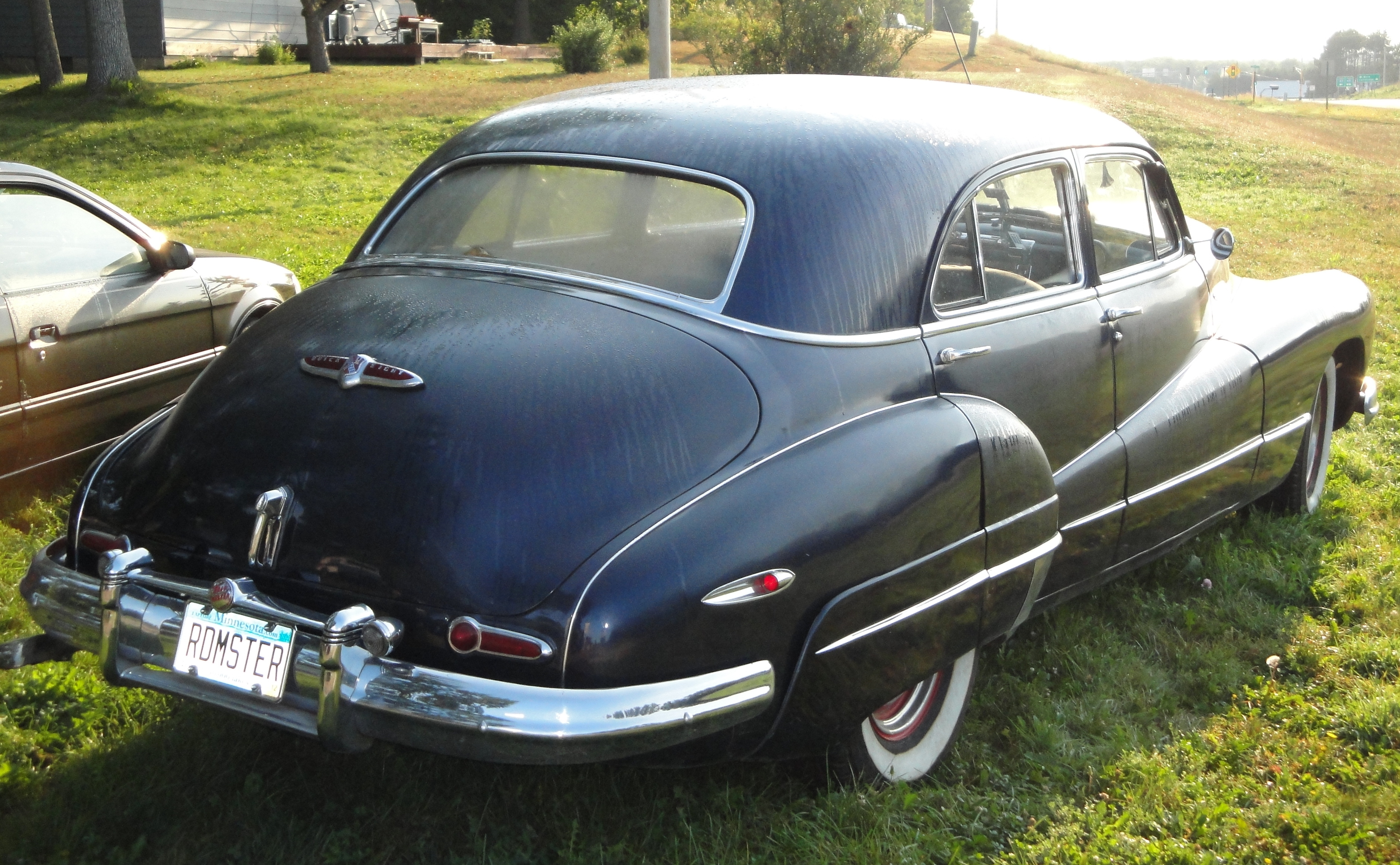
1947 Buick Roadmaster 4-door sedan rear

For the 1947 model year, a new stamped grille with a separate upper bar was used. The Roadmaster name appeared in red-filled script on a chrome button within the bumper guard crossbars, front, and rear. All new was an Estate wagon body style. It sold 300 units and became the top line in the station wagon market.

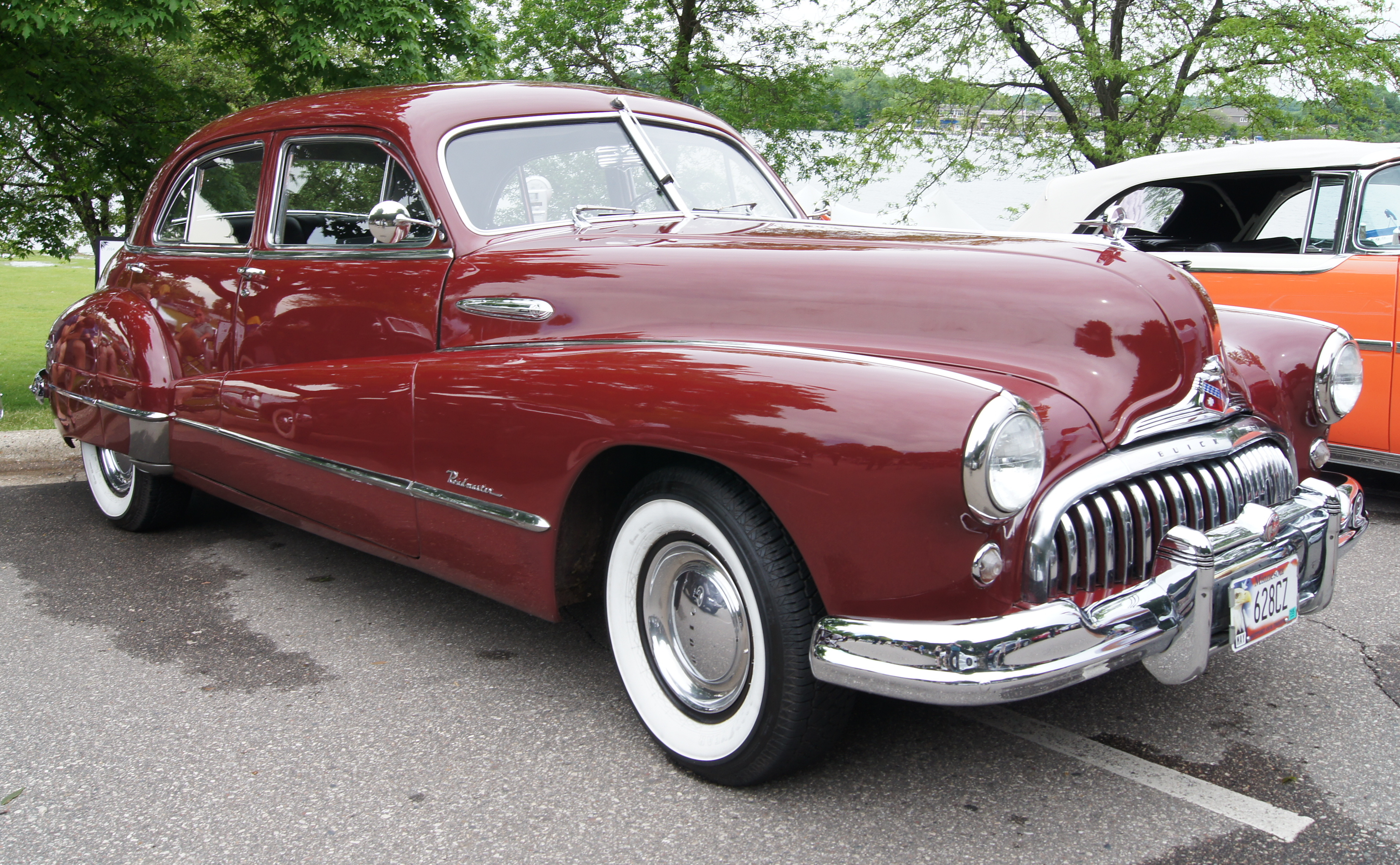
1948 Buick Roadmaster 4-door sedan

The 1948 models featured a series script on the front fenders, and the white Tenite steering wheel used previously was replaced with a black version. This also matched the change from a two-tone woodgrain instrument panel to a two-tone gray instrument panel, with silver-finished instruments. A new optional custom trim option was offered: cloth upholstery with leather bolsters, robe cord cover, and lower door panels trimmed in leatherette. Convertibles included power operation for windows, seats, and the top.

The Dynaflow was introduced, the first passenger car torque converter transmission. Optional on Roadmaster in its first year, it became standard equipment for 1949. Overall sales were just under 80,000 in both 1947 and 1948, over four times greater than in any prewar year.

== 1949–1953 ==
Fifth generation
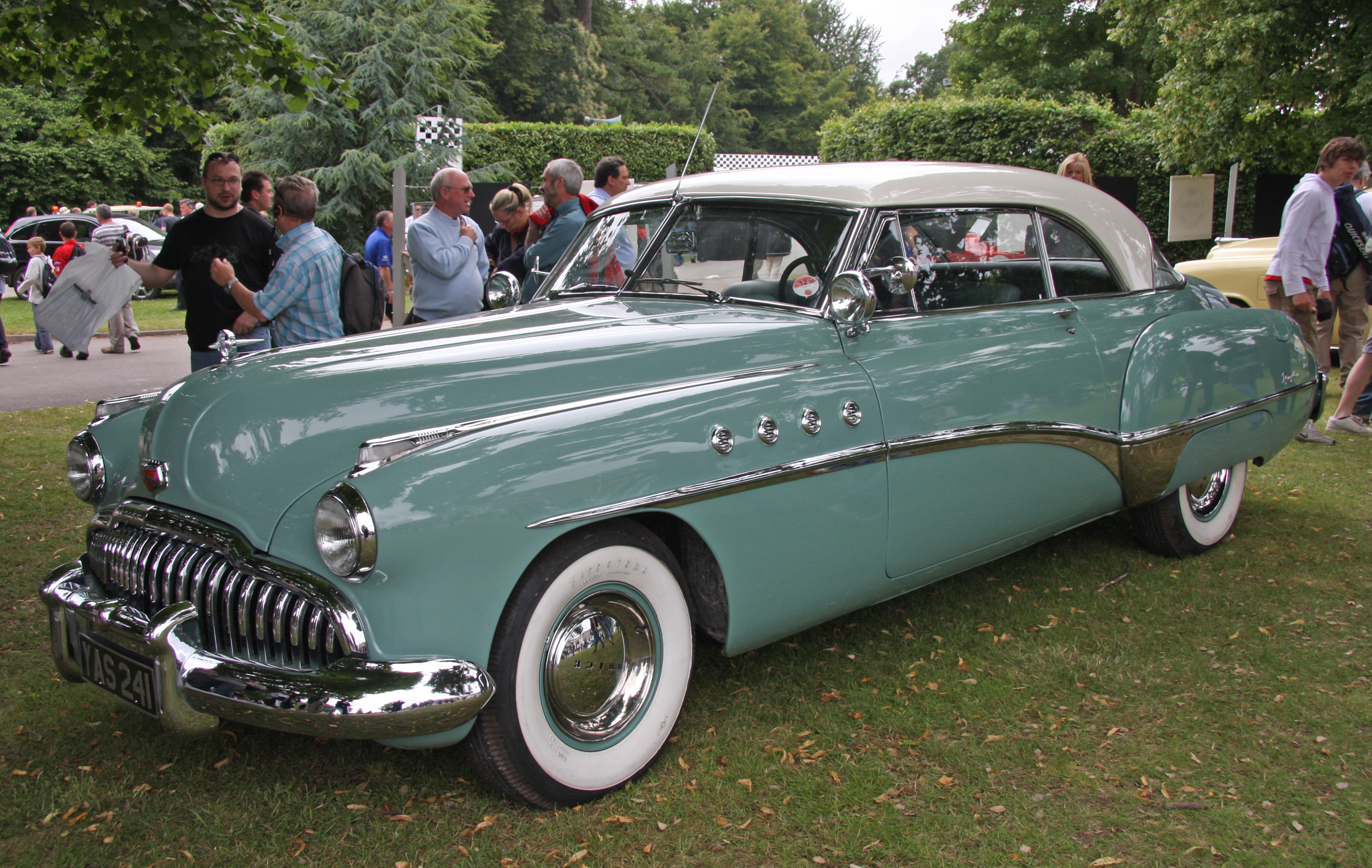
- 1949 Buick Roadmaster Riviera 2-door hardtop

Overview
- Model years: 1949–1953
- Assembly: Flint, Michigan, US (Buick City); Doraville, Georgia, US (Doraville Assembly) "Atlanta"; Framingham, Massachusetts, US (Framingham Assembly); Kansas City, Kansas, US (Fairfax Assembly); Linden, New Jersey, US (Linden Assembly); South Gate, California, US (South Gate Assembly); Wilmington, Delaware, US (Wilmington Assembly)
- Designer: Harley Earl

Body and chassis
- Body style: 4-door sedan 4-door Riviera sedan 2-door Sedanet coupe 2-door Riviera hardtop 2-door convertible 4-door Estate wagon 2-door Skylark convertible
- Platform: C-body
- Related: Cadillac Series 62; Cadillac Series 61; Buick Super; Oldsmobile 98

Powertrain
- Engine: 320 cu in (5.2 L) Fireball I8; 322 cu in (5.3 L) Fireball V8
- Transmission: 2-speed Dynaflow automatic

Dimensions
- Wheelbase: 1949: 126.0 in (3,200 mm); 1950-52 Riviera sedans: 130.3 in (3,310 mm); 1950–52 others: 126.3 in (3,208 mm); 1953 Riviera sedans: 125.5 in (3,188 mm); 1953 others: 121.5 in (3,086 mm)
- Length: 1949: 214.1 in (5,438 mm); 1950 Riviera sedans: 214.9 in (5,458 mm); 1950 others: 210.9 in (5,357 mm); 1951–52 Riviera sedans: 215.0 in (5,461 mm); 1951-52 others: 211.0 in (5,359 mm); 1953 Riviera sedans: 211.6 in (5,375 mm); 1953 others: 207.6 in (5,273 mm)
- Width: 79.9 in (2,029 mm)
- Height: 63.0 in (1,600 mm)
- Curb weight: 4,200–4,700 lb (1,900–2,100 kg)

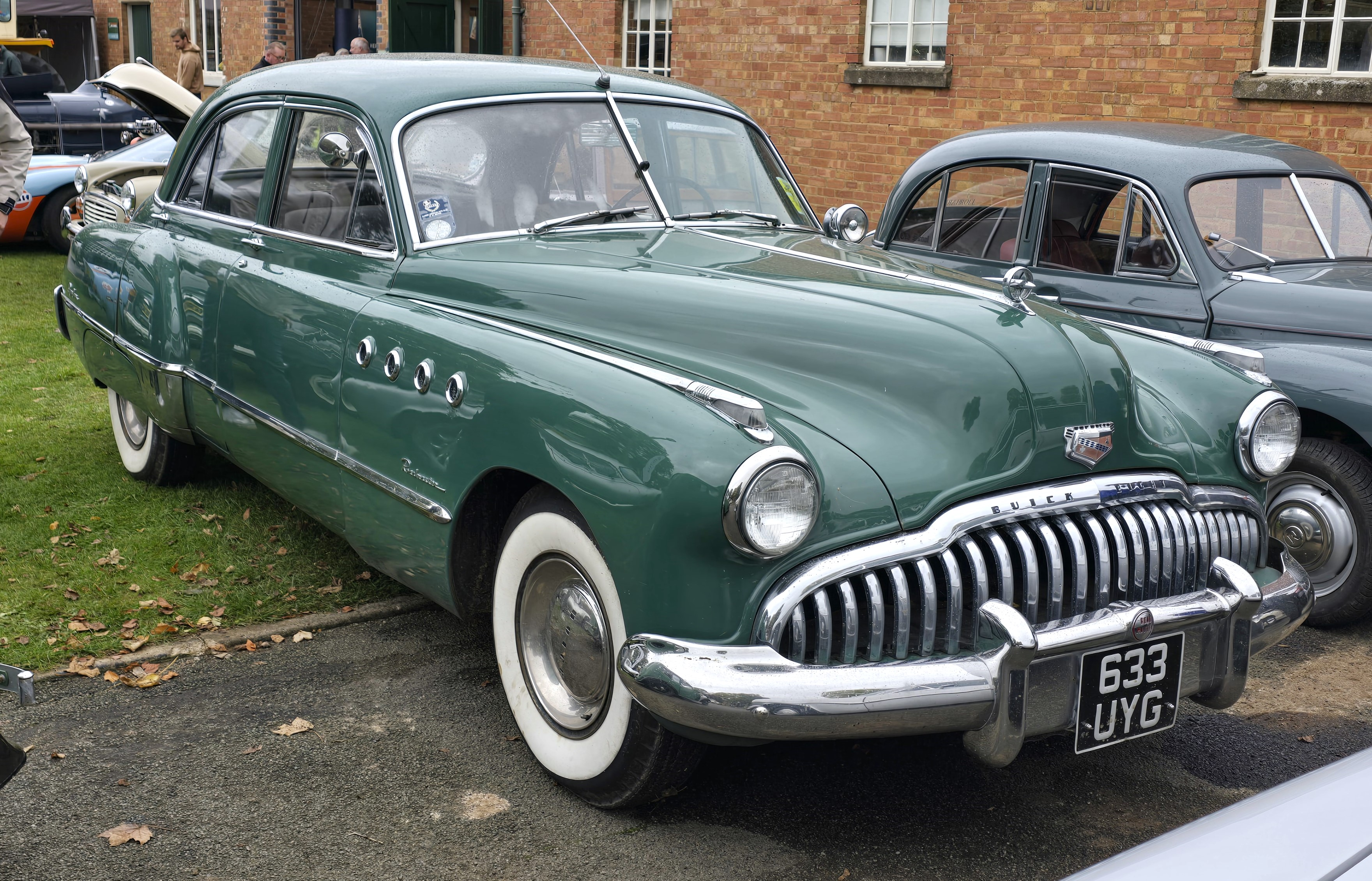
1949 Buick Roadmaster 4-door sedan

The Roadmaster received its first major postwar restyling in 1949. Its wheelbase and overall length were reduced, but its weight was marginally increased. The most significant change was a much larger two-piece, curved glass windshield that the sales brochure described as like an “observation car.” It was also in 1949 that Buick introduced "VentiPorts." Four were displayed on each of the Roadmaster and Century's front fenders, with three on the fenders of the Super and Special to denote junior level products. The sales brochure noted that VentiPorts helped ventilate the engine compartment, possibly true in early 1949, but they became non-functional sometime during the model year. The body styles were 2-door Sedanet fastback, 4-door sedan, 2-door convertible and 4-door wagon.

The idea for VentiPorts grew out of a modification Buick styling chief Ned Nickles had added to his own 1948 Roadmaster. He had installed four amber lights on each side of his car's hood wired to the distributor to flash on and off as each cylinder fired, simulating the flames from the exhaust stack of a fighter airplane. Combined with the bombsight mascot, VentiPorts put the driver in the control of an imaginary fighter airplane. Upon seeing this, Buick chief Harlow Curtice was so delighted that he ordered that (non-lighting) VentiPorts be installed on all 1949 Buicks, with the number of VentiPorts (three or four) corresponding to the relative displacement of the straight-eight engine installed.

Dynaflow was now standard equipment, and engine output was increased to 150 hp (112 kW; 152 PS) through a slight increase in the compression ratio. With the now-standard Dynaflow, this contributed to giving the new Buicks a top speed of 110 mph (177 km/h). In the middle of the year, the Riviera joined the body style lineup, selling 4,314 units. Featuring power windows as standard equipment, the two-door Buick Roadmaster Riviera, along with the Cadillac Series 62 Coupe de Ville and the Oldsmobile 98 Holiday, was among the first hardtop coupes produced. The Riviera Hardtop was conceived by taking the convertible and welding a steel roof, which simplified manufacture and improved the car's appearance.

The Riviera was also notable for its popular optional "Sweepspear" chrome body side molding, which would soon become a Buick trademark. This chrome-plated strip started above the front wheel, then gently curved down nearly to the rocker panel just before the rear wheel, and then curved around the rear wheel in a quarter of a circle to go straight back to the taillight. The "Riviera trim", as it was initially called, was also made available on the Roadmaster convertible late in the model year. With 88,130 sold, the all-time annual record for Roadmaster, the model accounted for 27% of all Buick sales, a high proportion despite its price being slightly less than a Cadillac Series 61.

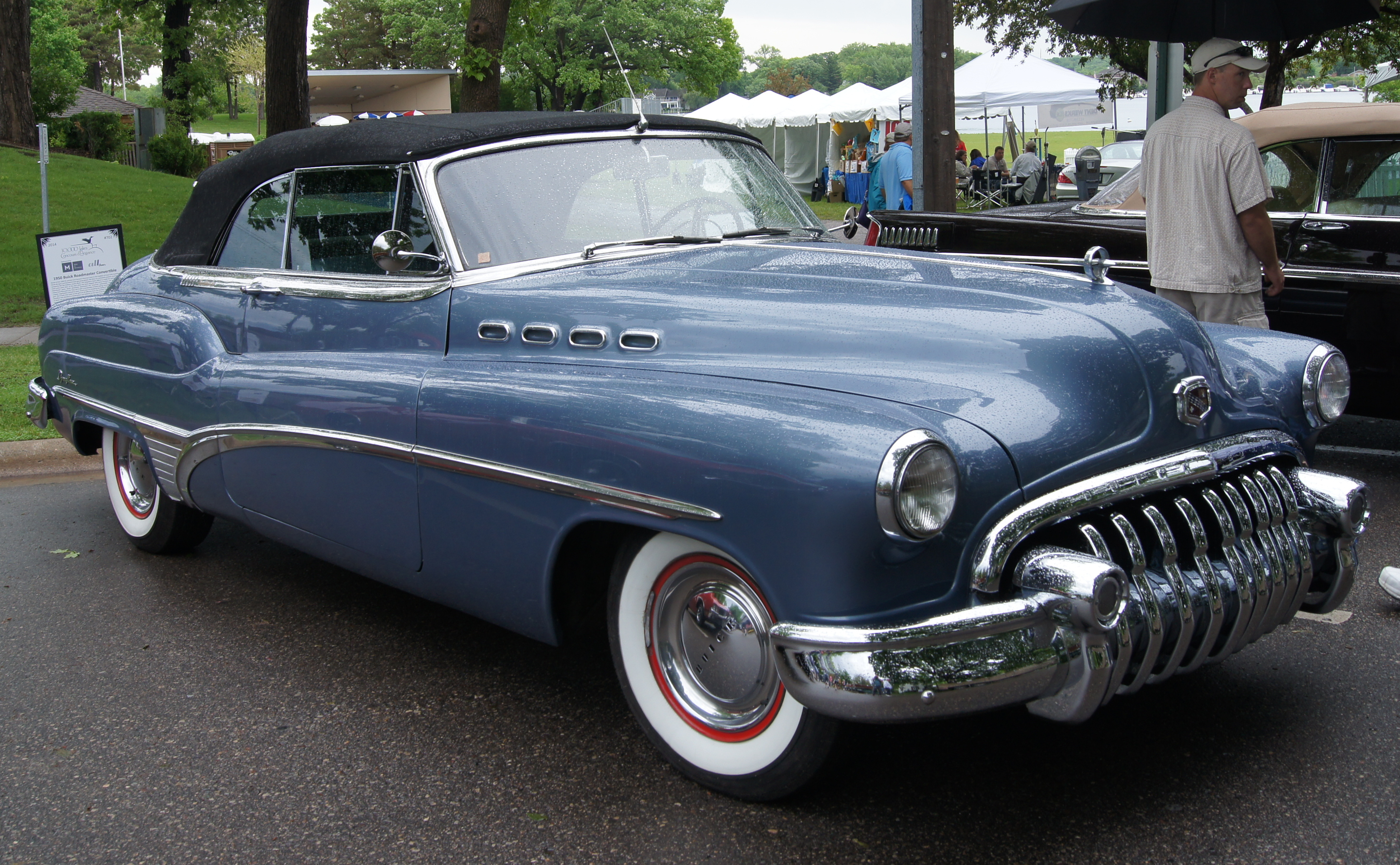
1950 Buick Roadmaster convertible

The 1950 restyling featured a "toothy" grille. The Sweepspear design was made standard on most body styles at the beginning of the 1950 model year, and on the station wagon and a new long-wheelbase sedan mid-year. The long-wheelbase sedan was lengthened by 4 inches (102 mm)). Like the convertibles, the Riviera and the long-wheelbase sedan came with power windows and seats as standard equipment. Roadmaster sales fell to 75,034, with Roadmaster's share of total Buick output plummeting to 12%.

For the 1951 model year, the long-wheelbase sedan was also called a Riviera, although it was not a hardtop. The regular wheelbase sedan were discontinued, alongside the Sedanet, with the fastback body style having become outdated by the turn of the decade.

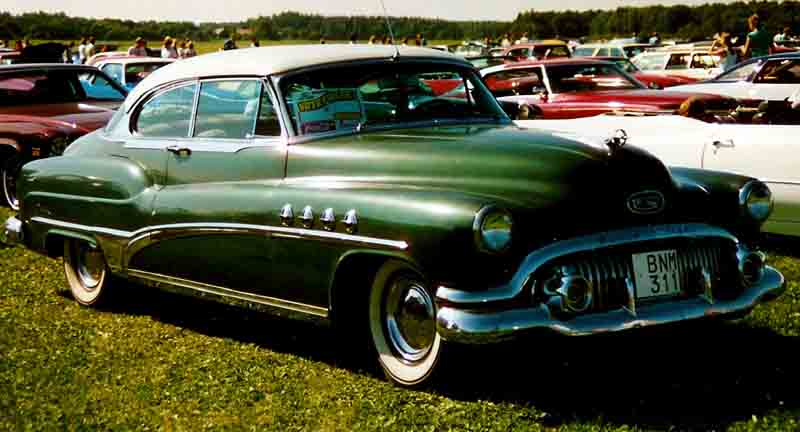
1951 Buick Roadmaster Riviera 2-door hardtop

Styling changes were minimal in 1951 and 1952. Power steering was added as an option in 1952, and the engine rating climbed to 170 hp (127 kW; 172 PS) primarily to a new four-barrel carburetor. Sales continued to decrease to about 66,000 in 1951 and totaled 51,000 units in 1952.

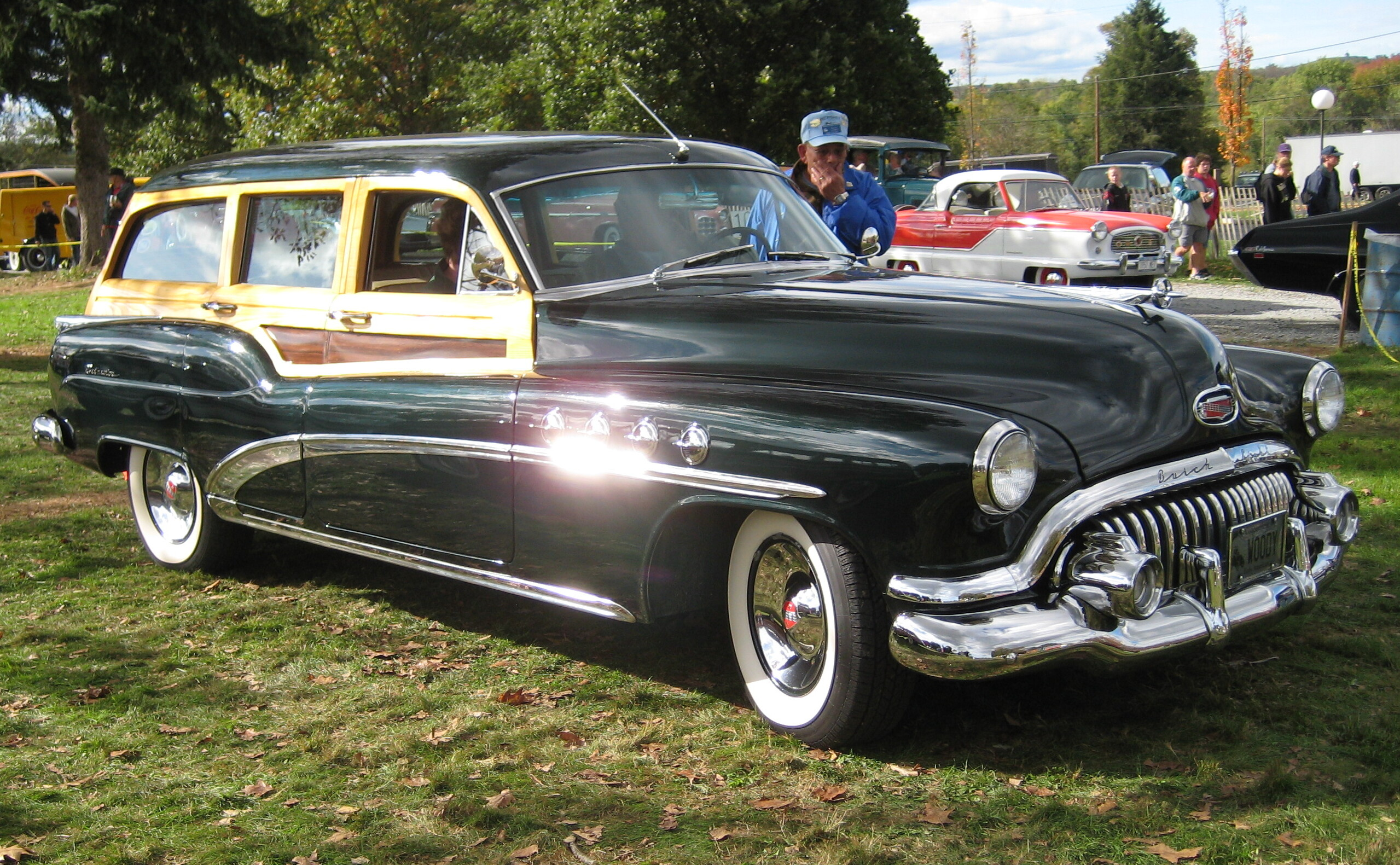
1952 Buick Roadmaster Estate Wagon

A new V8 engine was introduced for 1953, Buick's Golden Anniversary year. Although the Nailhead (as it was popularly called) was nearly identical in displacement to the straight-eight Fireball (322 versus 320 cubic inches), it was 13.5 inches (340 mm) shorter, four inches (100 mm) lower, and 180 lb (82 kg) lighter, but with 188 hp (140 kW), it was 11% more powerful. The compression ratio increased from 7.50:1 to 8.50:1 and torque increased from 280 to 300 lb⋅ft (380 to 407 N⋅m).

The compact dimensions of the V8 engine enabled Buick to reduce Roadmaster's wheelbase by 4.75 in (121 mm) across the line. However, styling differences behind the engine cowl, apart from the new V8 emblem hubcaps, were nonexistent. Buick also introduced a new "Twin-Turbine" Dynaflow as a companion for the V8 engine. Estimated to increase torque at the wheels by 10 percent, the new transmission provided faster and quieter acceleration at reduced engine speeds. Both power steering and power brakes were made standard. Air conditioning was a new option, and a 12-volt electrical system was adopted years before many other makes.

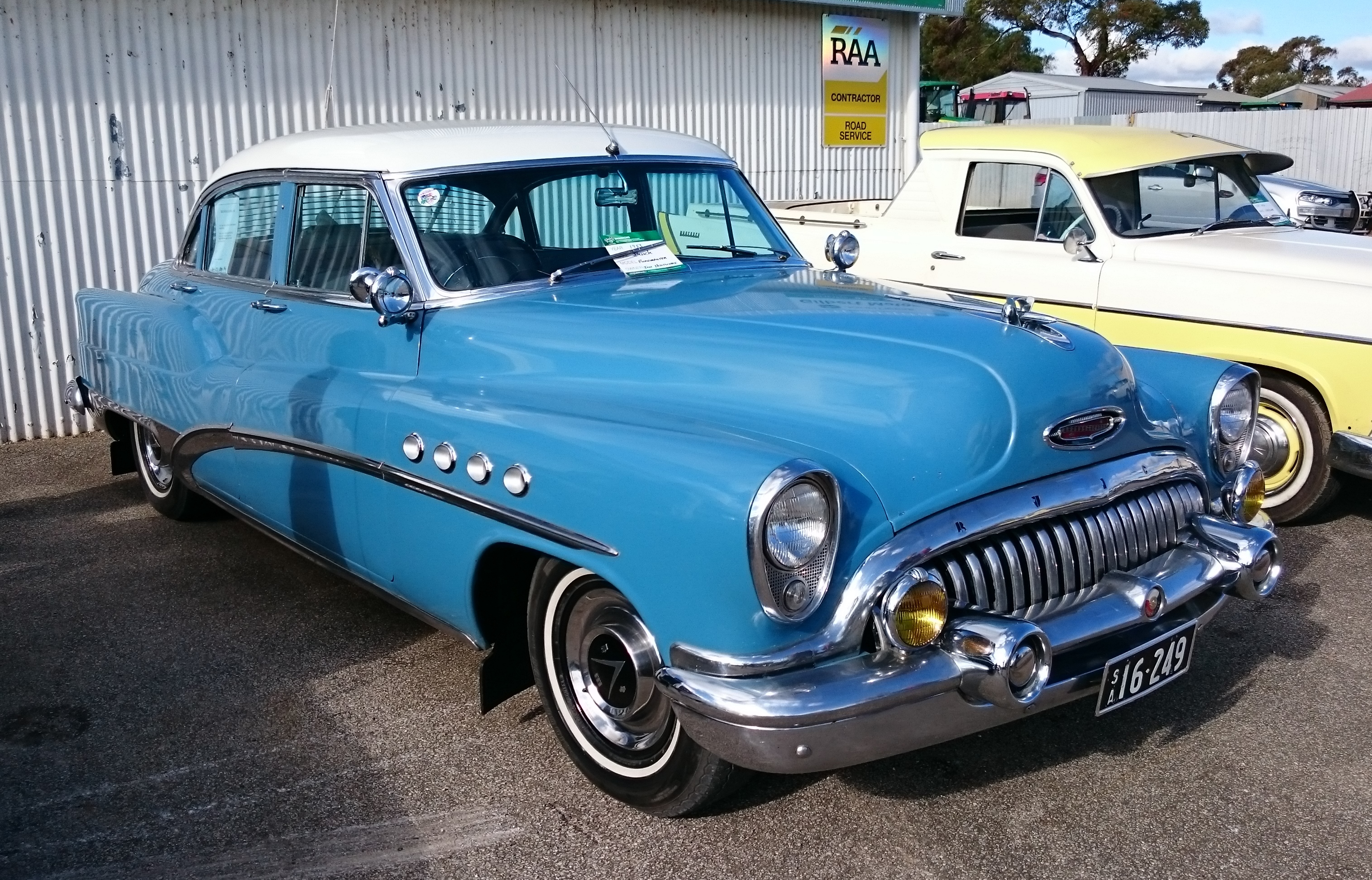
1953 Buick Roadmaster Riviera 4-door sedan

A new body style for 1953 was the Skylark convertible. The Buick Roadmaster Skylark was one of three specialty convertibles produced in 1953 by General Motors, the other two being the Oldsmobile 98 Fiesta and the Cadillac Series 62 Eldorado. The Skylark featured open wheel wells, a drastically lowered beltline, a four-inch-chop from the standard Roadmaster's windshield, the absence of VentiPorts, and a new Sweepspear that anticipated Buick's 1954 styling. Kelsey-Hayes wire wheels and a solid boot cover were standard. At US$5,000 ($60,168 in 2025 dollars) only 1,690 units were produced. The following year, and for one year only, it would become separate series built on the all-new 122 in (3,100 mm) Century chassis. This was the last year for the Roadmaster Estate, and it was the last wood-bodied station wagon mass-produced in the United States. Its body was a product of Ionia Manufacturing, which built all Buick station wagon bodies between 1946 and 1964. Priced at US$4,031 ($48,507 in 2025 dollars), the Estate was second in price only to the Skylark, with 670 being sold. Overall, Roadmaster sales went up to 79,137.

== 1954–1956 ==
Sixth generation
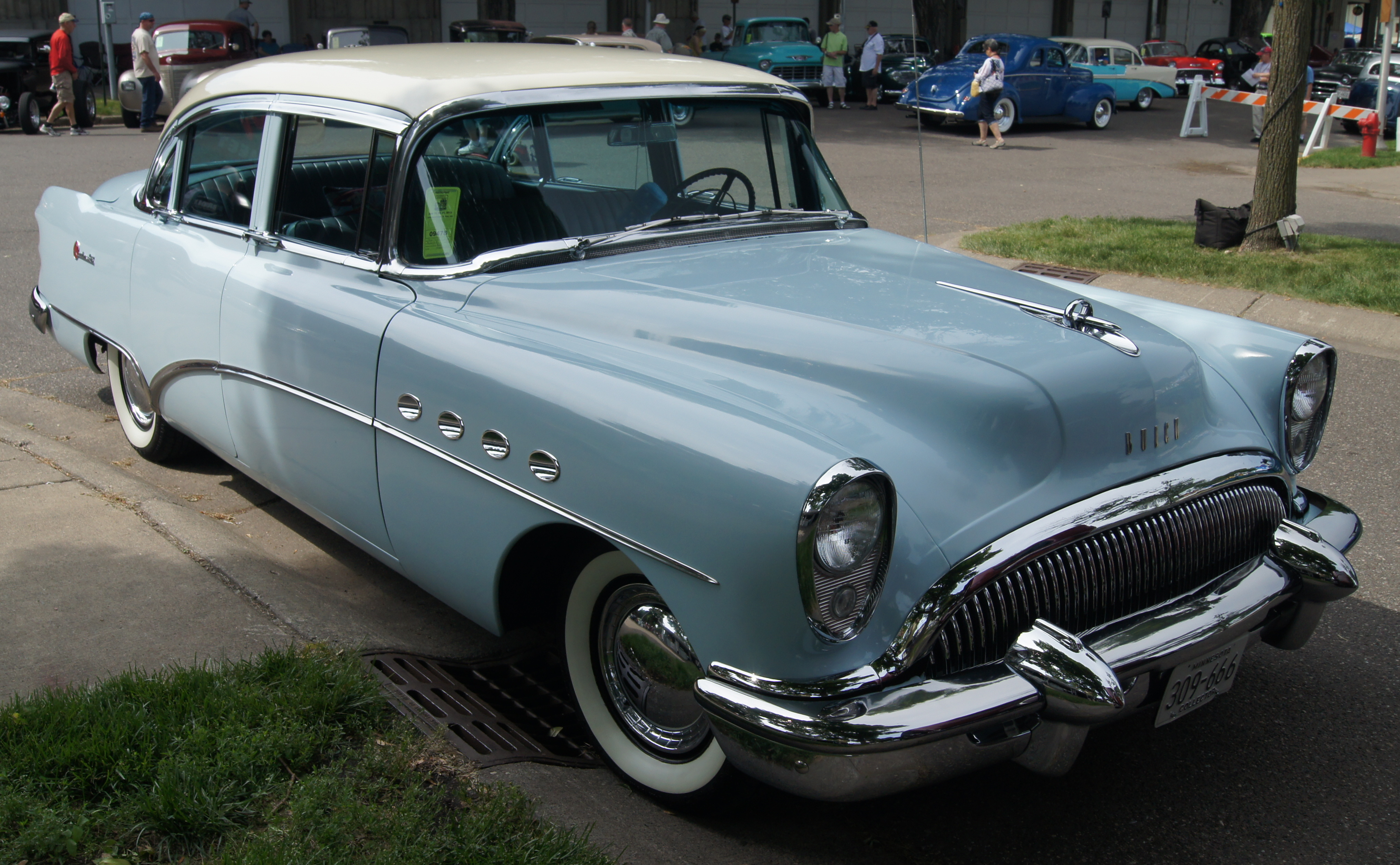
- 1954 Buick Roadmaster 4-door sedan

Overview
- Model years: 1954–1956
- Assembly: Flint, Michigan, US (Buick City); Arlington, Texas, US (Arlington Assembly); Doraville, Georgia, US (Doraville Assembly) "Atlanta"; Framingham, Massachusetts, US (Framingham Assembly); Kansas City, Kansas, US (Fairfax Assembly); Linden, New Jersey, US (Linden Assembly); South Gate, California, US (South Gate Assembly); Wilmington, Delaware, US (Wilmington Assembly)
- Designer: Harley Earl

Body and chassis
- Body style: 4-door sedan 4-door Riviera hardtop 2-door Riviera hardtop 2-door convertible
- Platform: C-body
- Related: Cadillac Series 62 Eldorado; Buick Roadmaster Skylark; Oldsmobile 98 Starfire

Powertrain
- Engine: 322 cu in (5.3 L) Fireball V8
- Transmission: 2-speed Dynaflow automatic

Dimensions
- Wheelbase: 127.0 in (3,226 mm)
- Length: 1954: 216.8 in (5,507 mm); 1955: 216.0 in (5,486 mm); 1956: 213.8 in (5,431 mm)
- Width: 79.8 in (2,027 mm)
- Height: 62.6 in (1,590 mm)
- Curb weight: 4,400–4,600 lb (2,000–2,100 kg)

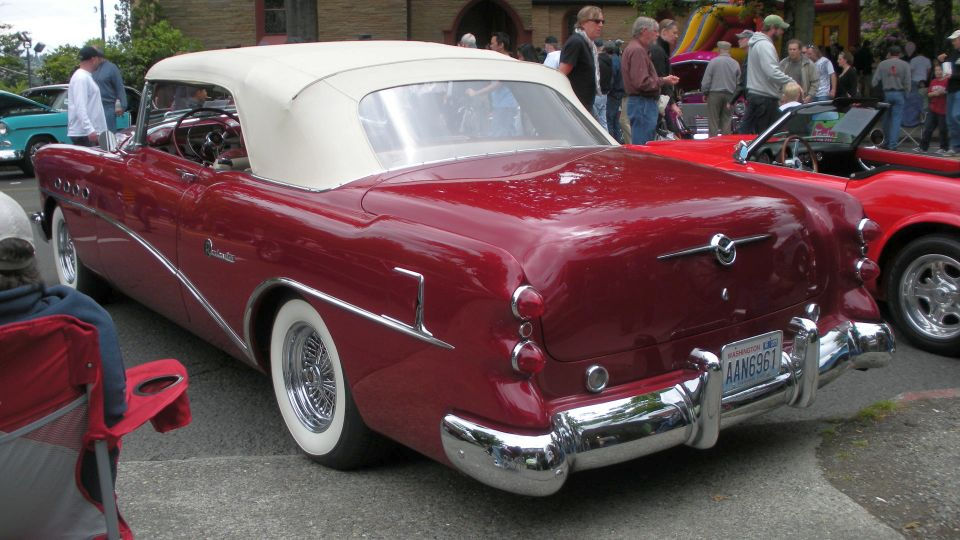
1954 Buick Roadmaster convertible rear

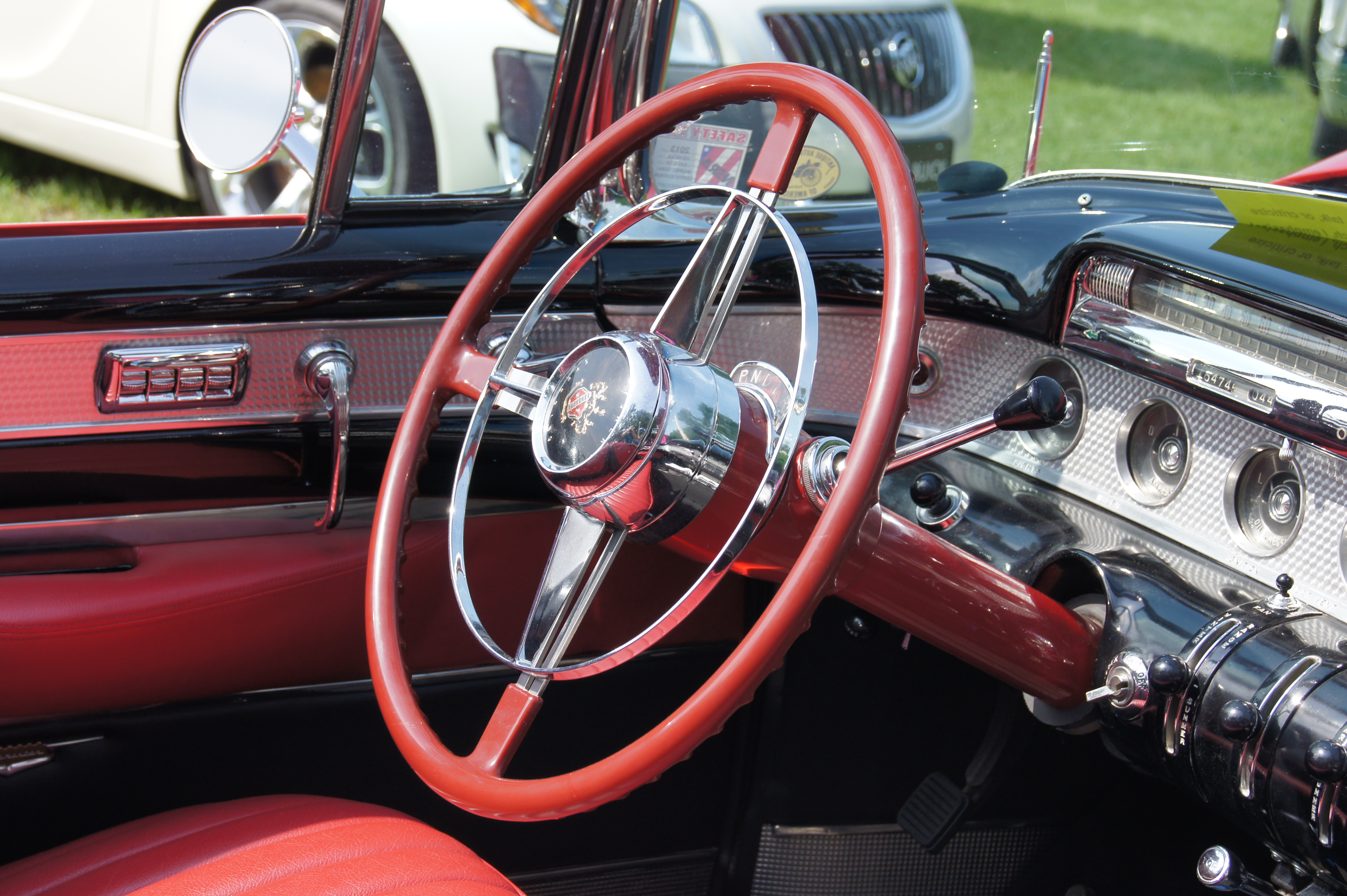
1954 Buick Roadmaster interior

For the 1954 model year, the Buick Roadmaster and Super shared with Cadillac and Oldsmobile 98 the new General Motors C-body, adopting the new "ponton" appearance, and the addition of "Dagmar bumpers" to the front. These were large, roomy cars, as much as five and a half inches longer in wheelbase and more than nine inches (230 mm) longer overall than in 1953. Roadmaster script was placed on the rear quarter panels and within the rear deck ornament. Rear fenders had a blunted fin at the rear edge, with dual "bullet" taillamps below. A new panoramic windshield with vertical side pillars was used. Seats had chrome bands on two-door models, and rear seats had an armrest on four-door models. The front suspension was refined, and Roadmaster's engine output was increased to 200 hp (149 kW; 203 PS), while the pillared coupe and the Estate wagon were no longer offered as body styles. Overall sales dropped to 50,571 (which was 11% of model year production). and the Roadmaster Convertible was listed at US$3,521 ($42,213 in 2025 dollars). Air conditioning was provided by Frigidaire optionally on sedans and hardtops, which consisted of a self-contained unit that was retrofitted at the customers' request.

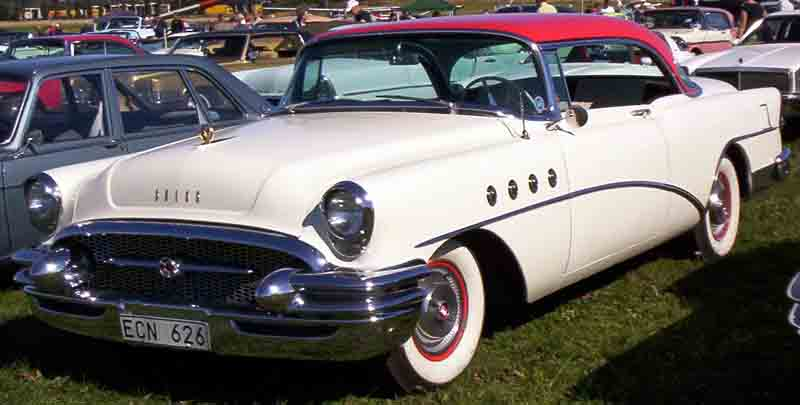
1955 Buick Roadmaster Riviera 2-door hardtop

In 1955, broad lower rear fender bands, gold-colored Roadmaster deck script and hood ornament, bars on the wheel covers, and a gold-accented grille were added to distinguish Roadmaster. The engine rating was increased to 236 hp (176 kW; 239 PS), and a new variable-pitch Dynaflow, in which the stator blades changed pitch under hard acceleration, provided quicker off-the-line getaway. Back-up lights were now standard. Overall sales were 64,527 (which was 8% of the model year production). and the Roadmaster Convertible replaced the exclusive Roadmaster Skylark convertible.

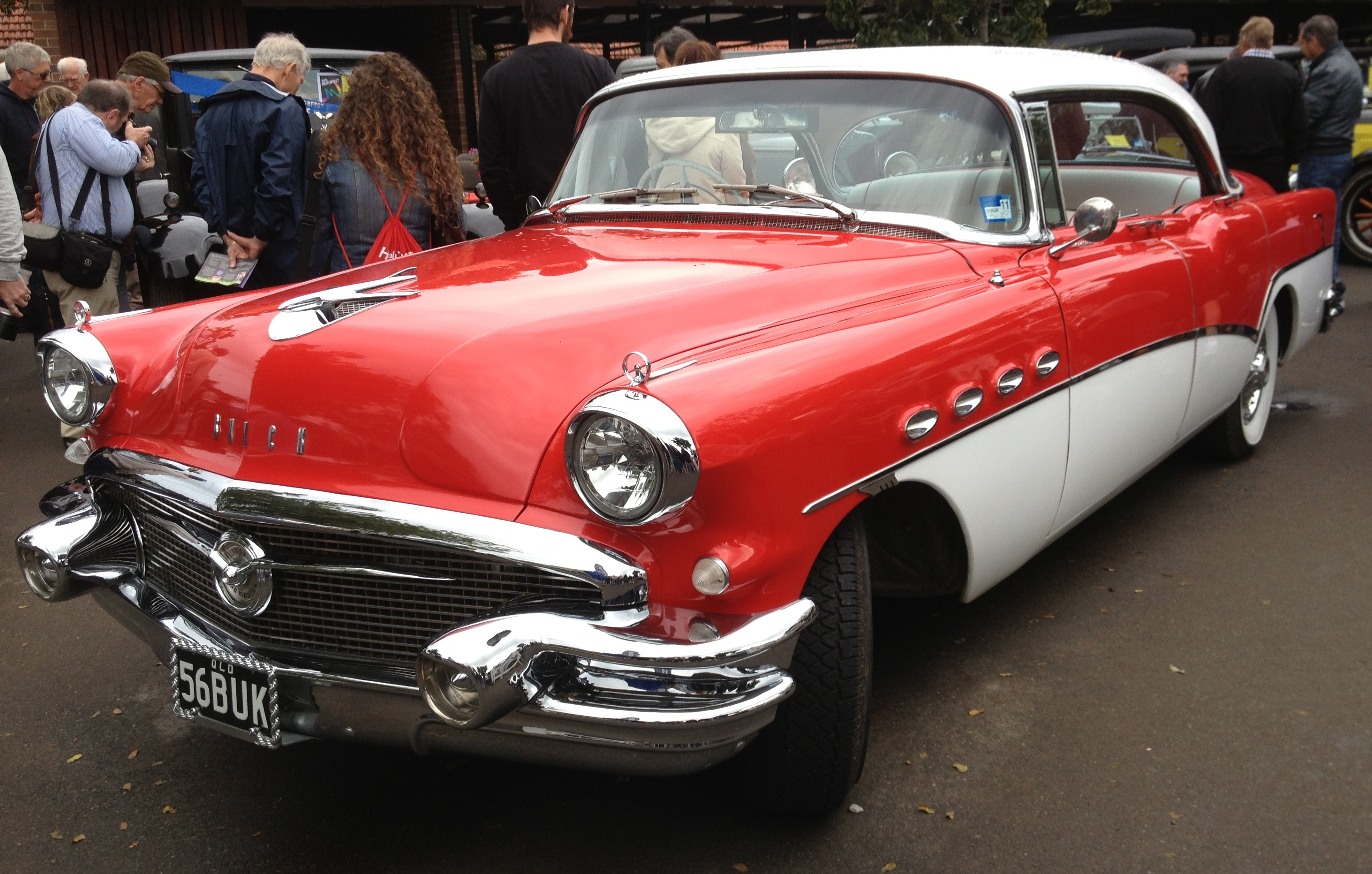
1956 Buick Roadmaster Riviera 4-door hardtop

In 1956, Roadmaster had a shallower Sweepspear that did not dip down to the rocker panel as on other models. Twin chrome strips were on the decklid, and Roadmaster was spelled between them. Roadmaster script was positioned on the doors beneath the vent windows. Fender tip dual bombsights were standard. Two stator wheels were adopted to improve the Dynaflow transmission. A brand new four-door Riviera hardtop, proved to be the most popular Roadmaster, with 24,770 units sold and beating the pillared sedan by more than two-to-one. Overall sales were 53,427 (which was 9% of model year production). A padded dash became standard.

== 1957–1958 ==
Seventh generation
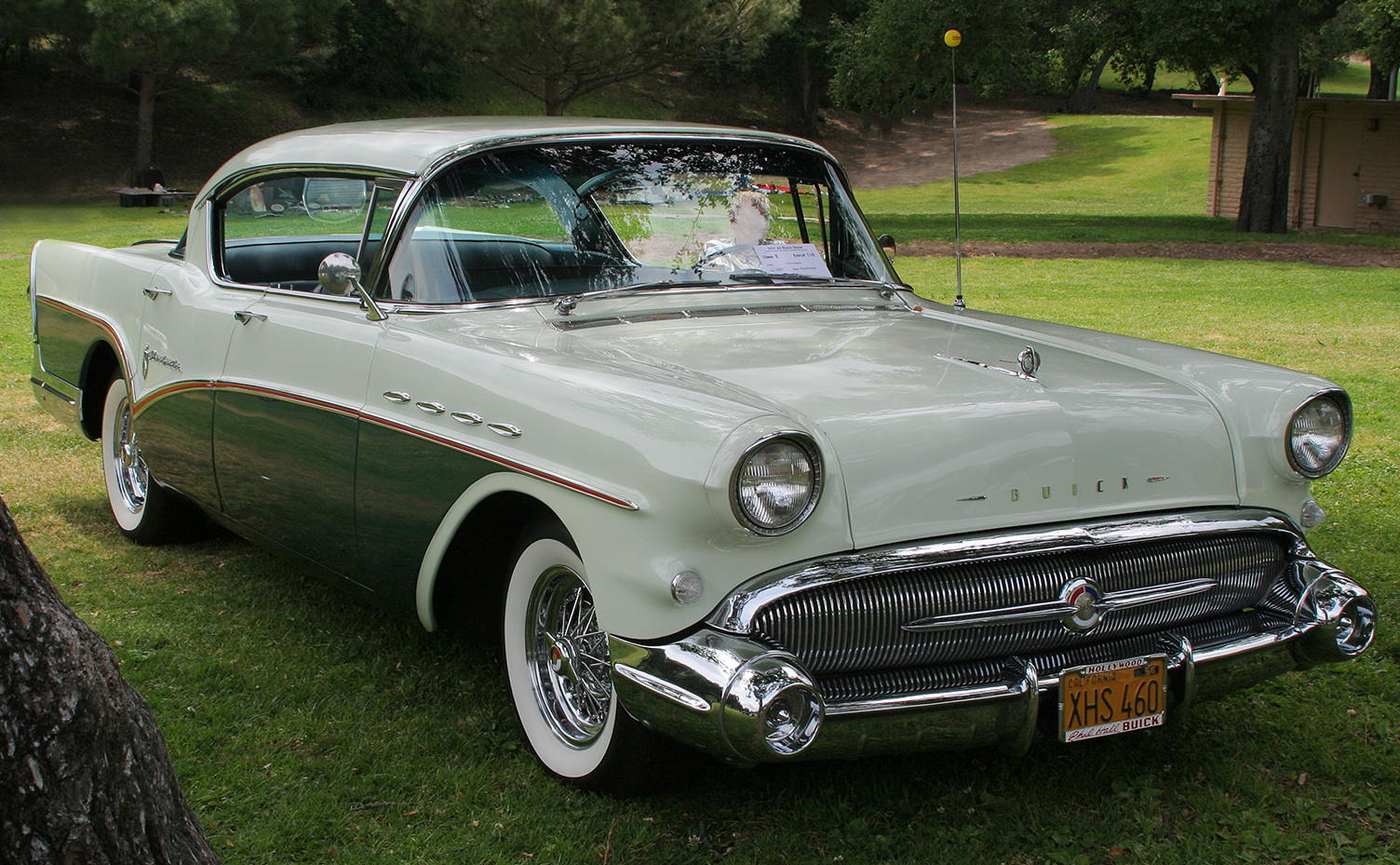
- 1957 Buick Roadmaster 4-door hardtop

Overview
- Model years: 1957–1958
- Assembly: Flint, Michigan, US (Buick City); Arlington, Texas, US (Arlington Assembly); Doraville, Georgia, US (Doraville Assembly); Framingham, Massachusetts, US (Framingham Assembly); Kansas City, Kansas, US (Fairfax Assembly); Linden, New Jersey, US (Linden Assembly); South Gate, California, US (South Gate Assembly); Wilmington, Delaware, US (Wilmington Assembly)
- Designer: Harley Earl

Body and chassis
- Body style: 4-door Riviera hardtop 2-door Riviera hardtop 2-door convertible
- Platform: C-body
- Related: Cadillac Series 62; Buick Limited; Buick Super; Oldsmobile 98

Powertrain
- Engine: 364 cu in (6.0 L) Fireball V8
- Transmission: 2-speed Dynaflow automatic

Dimensions
- Wheelbase: 127.5 in (3,238 mm)
- Length: 1957: 215.3 in (5,469 mm); 1958: 219.2 in (5,568 mm)
- Width: 79.8 in (2,027 mm)
- Height: 60.0 in (1,524 mm)
- Curb weight: 4,500–4,900 lb (2,000–2,200 kg)

Chronology
- Successor: Buick Electra 225

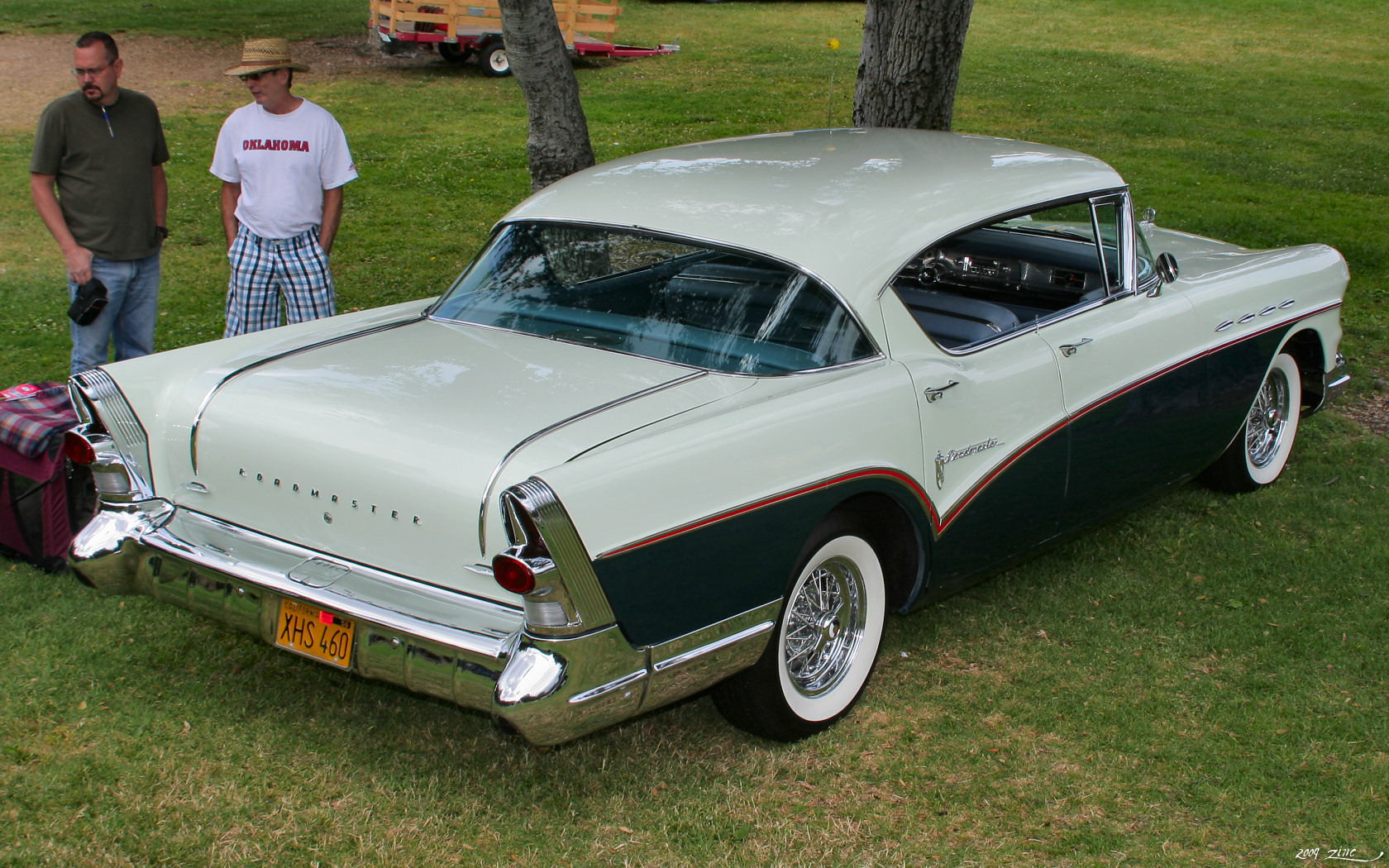
1957 Buick Roadmaster 4-door hardtop rear

The 1957 Roadmaster featured a lowered body style with an even more panoramic windshield with reverse slanted pillars. A red-filled Sweepspear lined the bodyside, and a chromed rear fender lower panel filled the area between the wheelhouse and the bumper end, continuing to offer "Dagmar bumpers" at the front. A new centered fuel filler was located in the rear bumper, the ends of which the single or optional dual exhaust passed through. Roadmaster script was placed within the deck and grille emblems. Two-door models had a trio of chevrons on the rear quarters, while the four-door models had a Roadmaster emblem nestled within the Sweepspear dip. Interiors featured a padded dashboard, broadcloth and nylon in four-door models, nylon in two-door versions, and leather in convertibles. Front hip room was 65.3-in.

A new 364 cu in (6.0 L) engine was rated at 300 hp (224 kW; 304 PS). A new ball-joint suspension system improved handling. The four-door Riviera hardtop proved popular the previous year so that the pillared sedan was dropped from the model lineup. Also, new was a mid-year production (March 1957) Roadmaster designated as Model 75 that featured standard power seats and windows, carpeted lower doors, a one-piece rear window (instead of a three-piece that was a design feature of the smaller Special and Century models), Deluxe hubcaps, and a Series 75 script identification on the rear quarter body panel of the Roadmaster coupes and the rear door panels on the Roadmaster four-door body styles, thus replacing the standard three chevrons found in the same location on the standard full model year Roadmaster model lines. Overall, Roadmaster sales dropped to about 33,000. The overall economy was in a recession starting in late 1956 and extending into 1958.

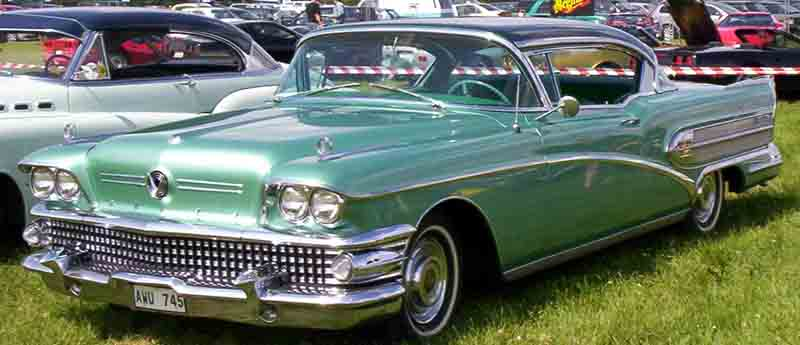
1958 Buick Roadmaster 75 Riviera 2-door hardtop

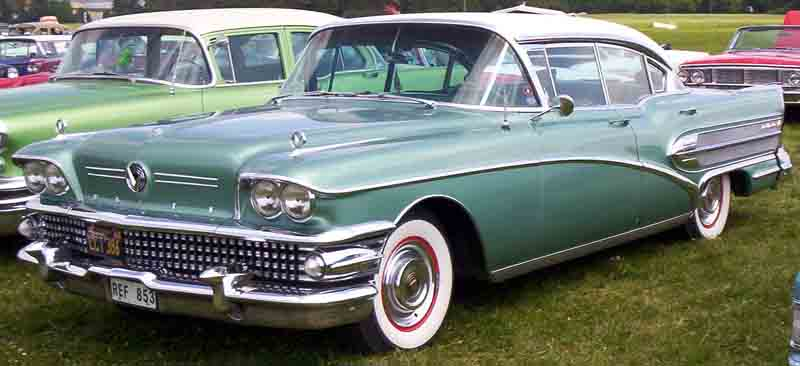
1958 Buick Roadmaster 75 Riviera 4-door hardtop

For the 1958 model year, GM was promoting their fiftieth year of production, and introduced anniversary models for each brand; Cadillac, Buick, Oldsmobile, Pontiac, and Chevrolet. The 1958 models shared a common appearance on the top models for each brand; Cadillac Eldorado Seville, Buick Roadmaster Riviera, Oldsmobile Holiday 88, Pontiac Bonneville Catalina, and the all-new Chevrolet Bel-Air Impala.

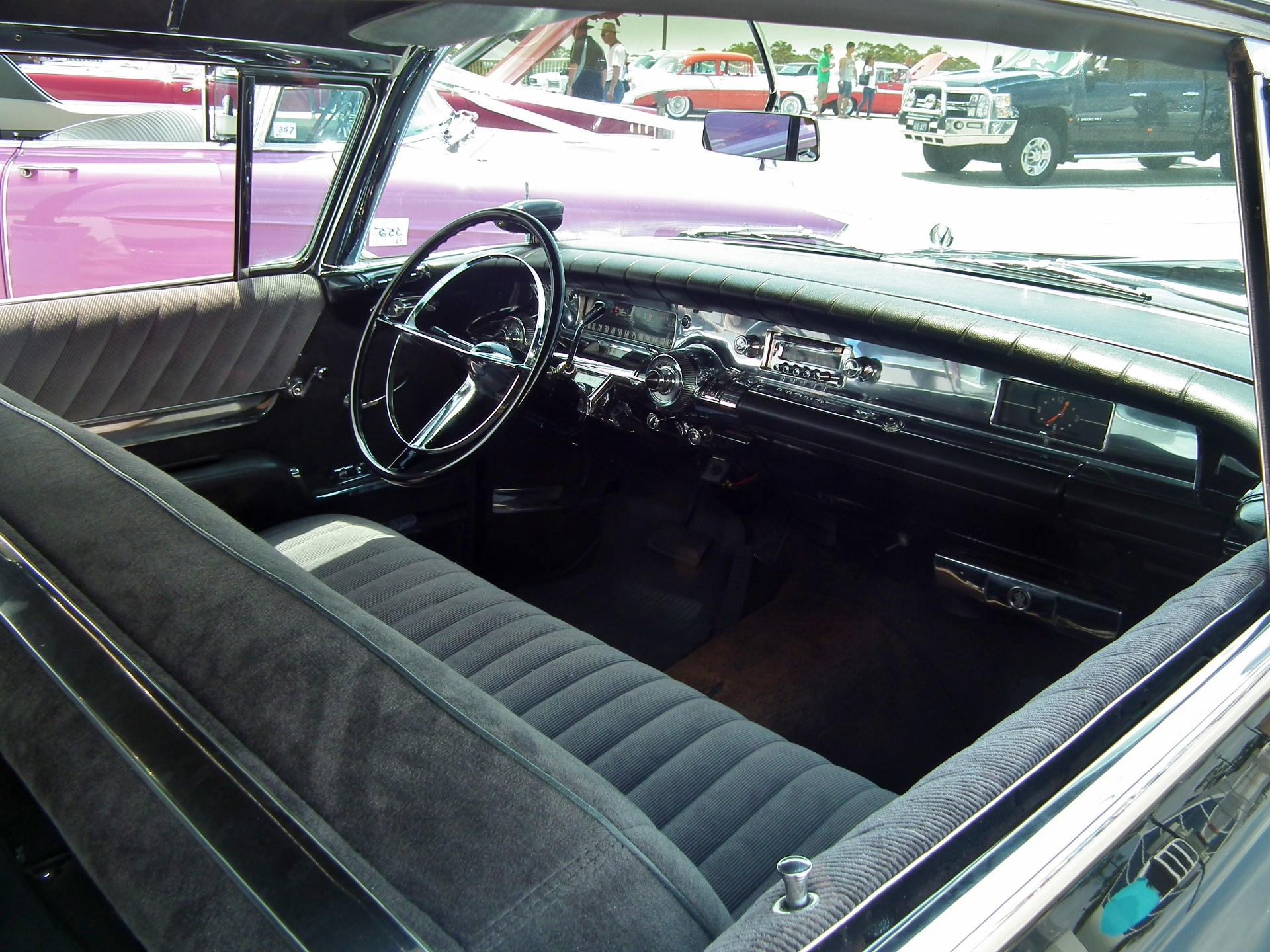
1958 Buick Roadmaster 4-door hardtop interior

In 1958, the Roadmaster was available in the well-equipped "75" version, and the body was fitted with bulkier and more heavily chromed styling, while the top trim package Limited was the most expensive and fully optioned vehicle. A new "drawer pull" grille was used that Buick called "Fashion-Aire Dynastar", made up of rectangular chrome squares. For the first time since 1948, there were no distinguishing VentiPorts on the front fenders. On the rear deck, the Roadmaster name was spelled out in block lettering beneath a Buick emblem housing the trunk lock keyway. Wheelhouses had bright moldings, rocker panels had an ebbed molding, and a large rear fender bright flash with ribbed inserts replaced the previous year's chromed rear fender lower panel. Four headlamps were standard. New brakes featured cast-iron liners in aluminum drums. Sales fell further to about 14,000.

There was a complete restyling for 1959, but this time, the names of the various series were changed. Not until 1991 would there again be a big Buick known as the Roadmaster; the biggest Buick models were renamed the Electra.

== 1991–1996 ==
Eighth generation
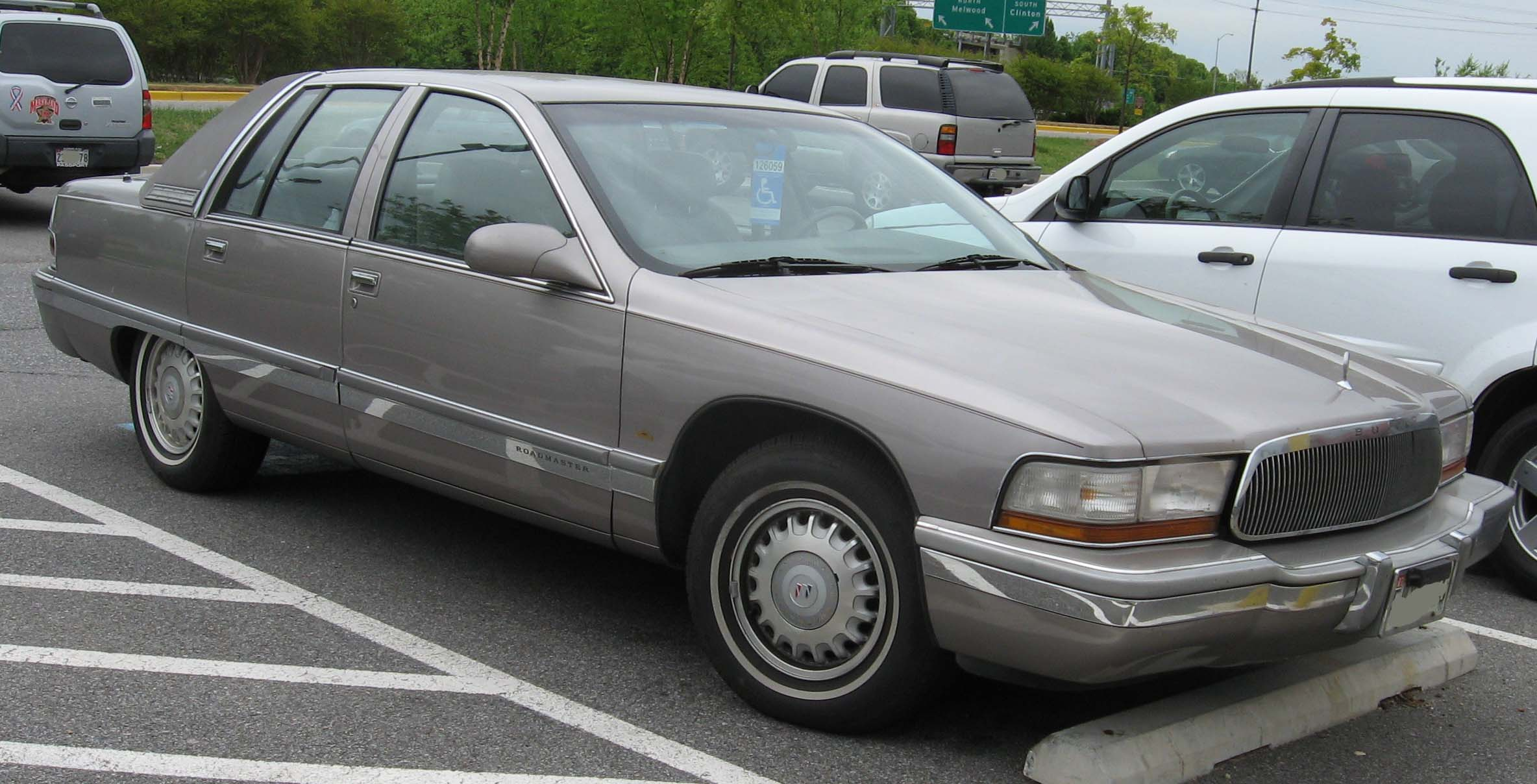

Overview
- Model years: 1991–1996
- Assembly: Arlington Assembly, Arlington, Texas, U.S. (1992–1996 sedan, 1994–1996 wagon); Willow Run Assembly, Ypsilanti, Michigan, U.S. (1991–1993 wagon)
- Designer: Wayne Kady (1989)

Body and chassis
- Body style: 4-door sedan 5-door station wagon
- Layout: FR layout
- Platform: GM B platform
- Related: Buick Estate; Chevrolet Caprice; Chevrolet Impala SS; Oldsmobile Custom Cruiser

Powertrain
- Engine: 5.0 L L03 V8; 5.7 L L05 V8; 5.7 L LT1 V8
- Transmission: 4-speed 4L60 automatic 4-speed 4L60-E automatic

Dimensions
- Wheelbase: 115.9 in (2,944 mm)
- Length: 215.8 in (5,481 mm) (sedan); 217.7 in (5,530 mm) (1991–93 wagon); 217.5 in (5,524 mm) (1994–96 wagon)
- Width: 78.1 in (1,984 mm) (sedan); 79.9 in (2,029 mm) (wagon)
- Height: 55.9 in (1,420 mm) (sedan); 60.3 in (1,532 mm) (wagon)
- Curb weight: 4,400–4,700 lb (2,000–2,100 kg)

Chronology
- Predecessor: Buick Electra Park Avenue

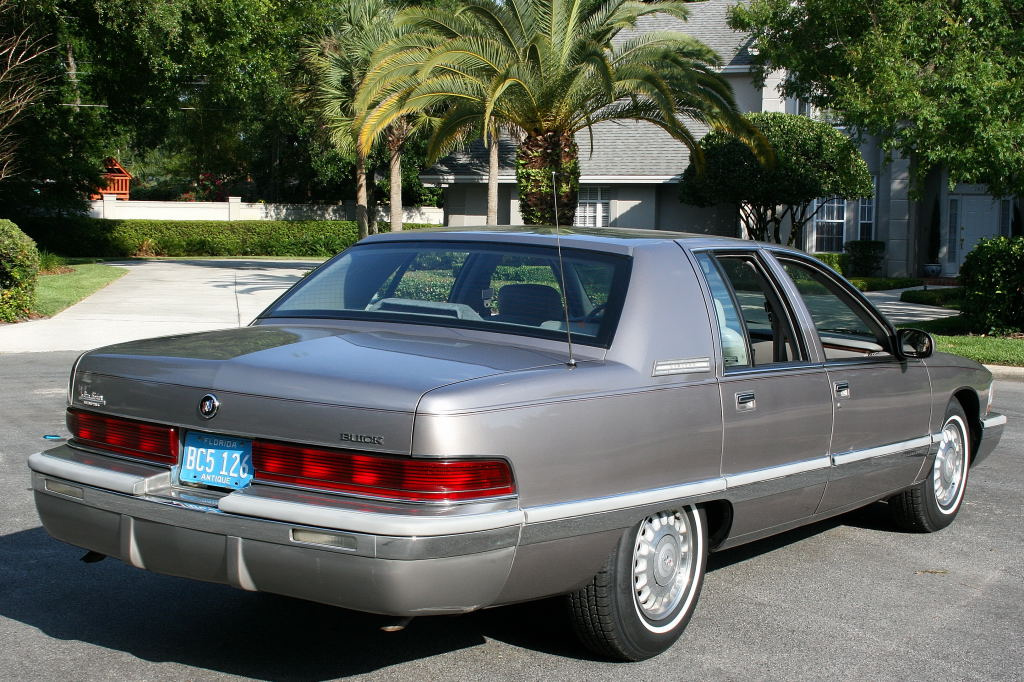
1995 Buick Roadmaster Limited sedan

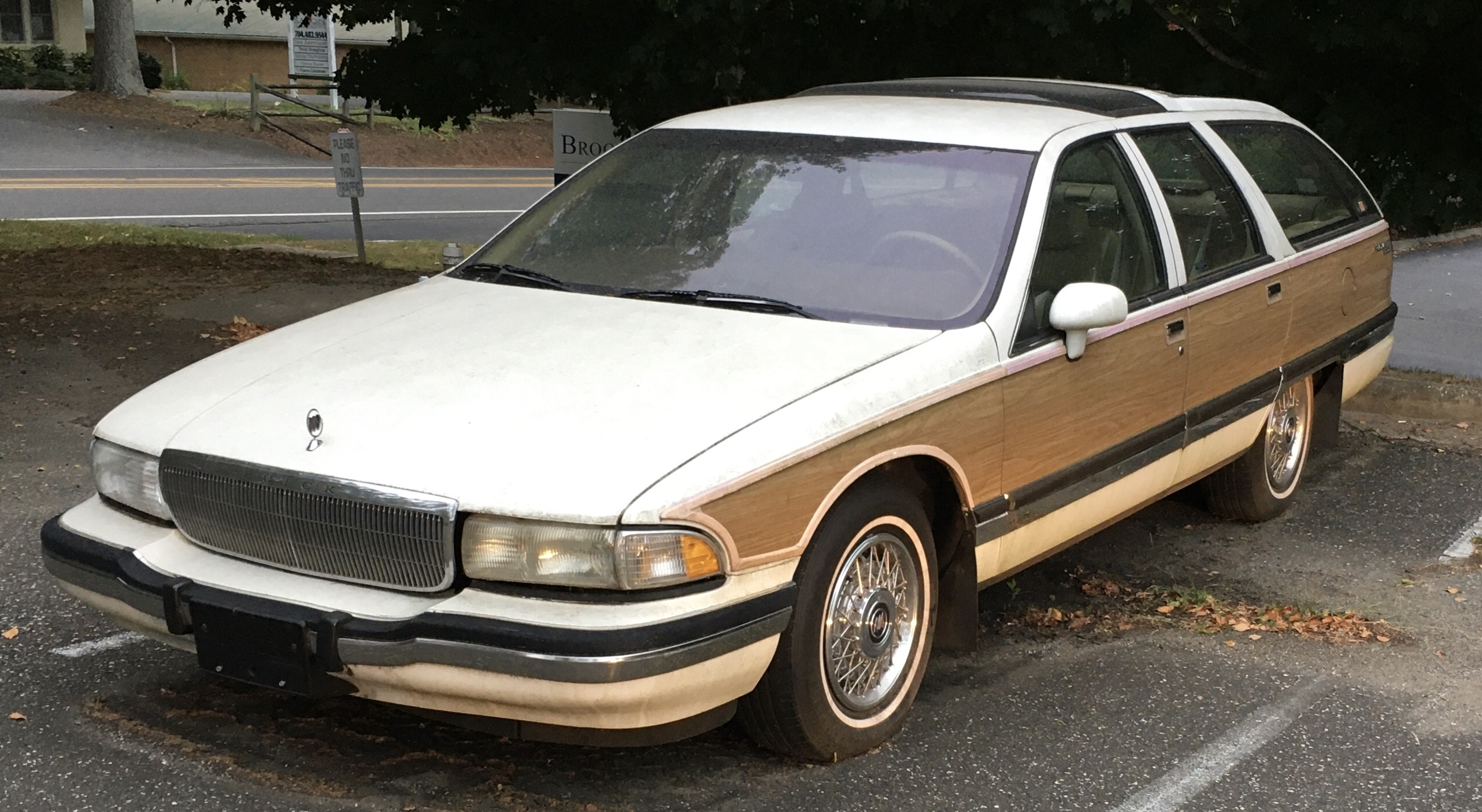
Buick Roadmaster Estate Wagon

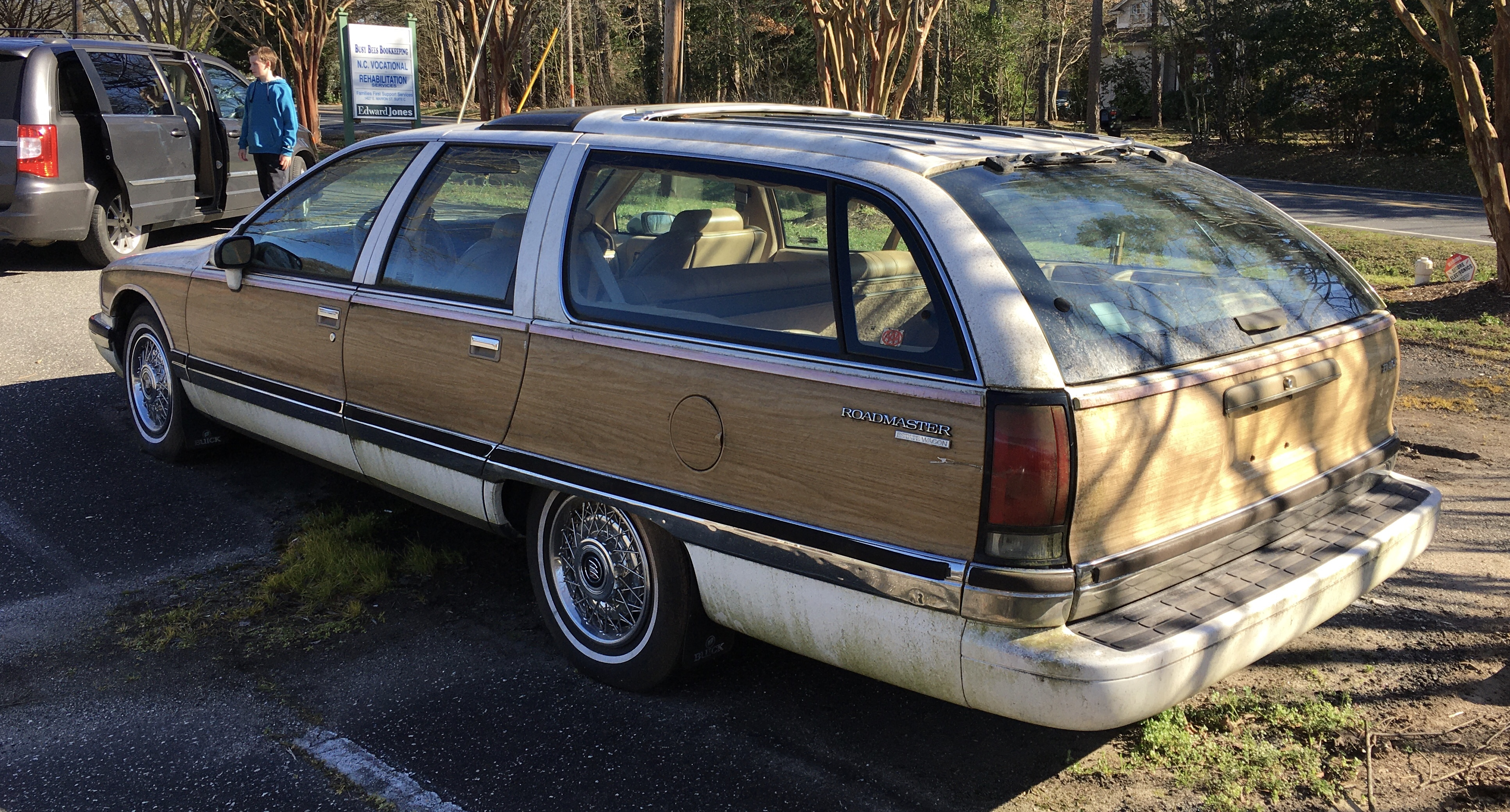
Buick Roadmaster Estate Wagon

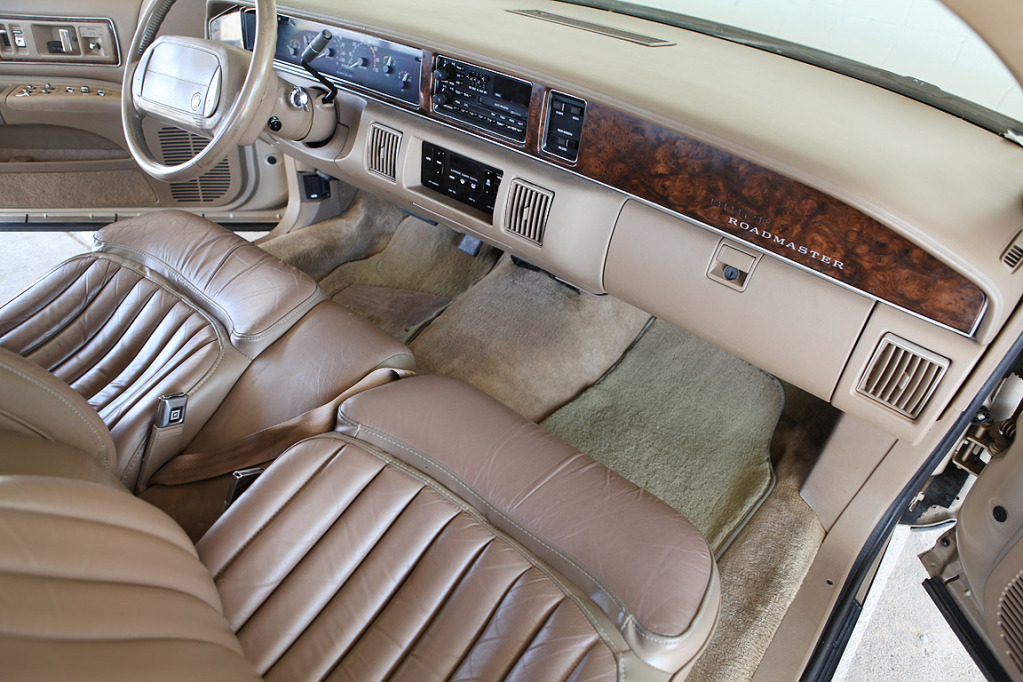
1993 Estate Wagon interior

The Roadmaster name returned to the Buick line for the 1991 model year after a 33-year absence, with the third generation Buick Estate wagon becoming the Roadmaster Estate. A four-door sedan was added to the Roadmaster line for the 1992 model year, the first rear-wheel drive Buick sedan since 1985. Combined sales showed an over tenfold increase over 1991 thanks in part to an extended production run which had 1992 models going on sale in March 1991.

=== Chassis ===
As with its precursor, the new Roadmaster Estate wagon was based on GM's full-size rear-wheel drive B platform, which was closely related to the GM C-body and D-body chassis reserved for top of the line Buicks and Cadillacs. It rode on the same 115.9 in (2,944 mm) wheelbase since the wagon series was downsized from the C-body in 1977, yet it was three inches shorter than the 1990 model.

The Roadmaster sedan, a C-body vehicle over its eight previous generations, shared the B-body for the first time. It stood not only as the largest Buick, 10 in (254 mm) longer with a 5 in (127 mm) greater wheelbase than the apparent top-of-the-line C-bodied Buick Park Avenue, but larger both in wheelbase (2 inches) and overall length (6 inches) than the K-body Cadillac Sedan de Ville.

=== Powertrain ===
The standard engine for the 1991 wagon was a 170 hp (127 kW) 5.0 L L03 Chevrolet small-block V8. It was replaced a year later with a 180 hp (134 kW) 5.7 L L05 Chevrolet small-block V8 shared by both wagon and sedan. In 1994, both received a substantial power and performance boost with an upgrade to a modified version of the advanced 5.7 L sequential point fuel-injection LT1 V8 introduced two years earlier in the C4 Corvette. Coupled with standard dual exhaust, it increased output to 260 hp (194 kW).

This version of the LT1 was shared with a limited range of B-and D platform luxury and performance cars such as the Chevrolet Caprice Police Package and Cadillac Fleetwood, as well as specialty versions of GM's two F-bodied pony cars, the Chevrolet Camaro Z28 and Pontiac Firebird Trans Am. Engines used in luxury cars had iron instead of aluminum heads for durability, camshafts tuned for increased low-end torque, and intake silencers to decrease engine noise.

While installed partly to better comply with emissions and fuel-economy standards, the LT1 V8 not only offered an 80 hp (60 kW) power increase, but raised rated fuel economy by 1 mpg, to 17 mpg city/25 mpg highway. As a result of this significantly boosted engine output, General Motors limited the softer-riding Roadmaster (which ran on lower speed-rated tires than used on the Corvette) to a top speed of 108 mph (174 km/h). For 1996, the LT1 became OBD-II compliant.

All three Roadmaster V-8s were paired to a four-speed automatic transmission. In 1994, the hydraulically controlled 4L60 (700R4) transmission was replaced by the electronically controlled 4L60E.

When ordered with the factory towing package, the 1994 through 1996 Roadmaster was rated to tow up to 5,000 pounds (2,300 kg). For the station wagon, this could be raised to 7,000 pounds with the use of a weight-distributing hitch, dual sway controls, setting rear tire pressure to 35 PSI, and disabling the Electronic Level Control. The towing package added 2.93 rear-axle gears and a limited-slip differential, heavy-duty cooling system including oil and transmission coolers, and a factory-installed self-leveling rear suspension called Dynaride, which consisting of air shocks, a height sensor between the rear axle and body and an on-board air compressor. Most visibly, a pair of electric fans offset to the left under the hood was replaced by the combination of one conventional fan driven mechanically from the engine alongside one electric fan.

=== Body ===
The Roadmaster Estate wagon shared its body with the Caprice Estate and Oldsmobile Custom Cruiser; common styling features included the Caprice's headlights and the Custom Cruiser's 2nd-row "Vista Roof" with a sunroof. Simulated woodgrain sides were standard, though the treatment could be removed for credit. All three wagons offered an optional rear-facing third-row seat, bringing the seating capacity to eight. The Roadmaster sedan had a distinct fascia, featuring its grille and headlights stacked above running lights and turn signals. It shared a formal sedan roofline with the Cadillac Fleetwood, but was nine inches shorter in length and six inches in wheelbase. The 1995 and 1996 sedan models no longer had the Roadmaster emblem mounted on the quarter panels.

The interior was redesigned for the 1994 model year, which included new dual airbags, moving some instrument panel gauges closer to the steering wheel, and revisions to the radio and climate controls. The side-view mirrors were changed in 1995, changing from a "Lolipop" style mirror mounted on the door skin, to a new folding design mounted on the sail panel. The 1995 Roadmaster retained its skirted rear wheels (removed from the Caprice/Impala SS), while the sedan was updated with new bodyside moldings. Station wagons saw a shade for the Vista Roof and a cargo cover. In 1996, automatic climate control became standard, and the rear seatbelts were redesigned with a "cinching" feature.

=== Discontinuation ===
With production of over 200,000 Roadmasters over six years, a combination of overcrowding among Buick's high-end sedans and pressure from full-size SUVs on the Estate wagon led to GM focusing on higher profit margin vehicles, such as pickups and the truck-bodied Chevrolet Suburban. In 1996, the Arlington Assembly facility in Texas was converted to assemble SUVs and pickup trucks, marking the end of Roadmaster production. The final vehicle was built on December 13, 1996. All 1996 Roadmaster Estates received a "Collector's Edition" hood ornament in place of the traditional tri-shield Buick badge.

With Ford stopping production of its Country Squire and Colony Park station wagons in 1991, the discontinuation of the Roadmaster Estate and Chevrolet Caprice Estate marked the end of the full-size station wagon until the introduction of the 20-inch shorter, 5-inch narrower LX-bodied Dodge Magnum wagon in 2005.

Production Figures:

Buick Roadmaster Production Figures
	Sedan	Wagon	Yearly Total
1991	-	6,729	6,729
1992	59,712	11,019	70,731
1993	28,829	9,525	38,354
1994	26,429	8,669	35,098
1995	22,942	5,522	28,464
1996	12,581	8,962	21,543
Total	150,493	50,426	200,919
