= Oldsmobile Silhouette =

Minivan produced by General Motors

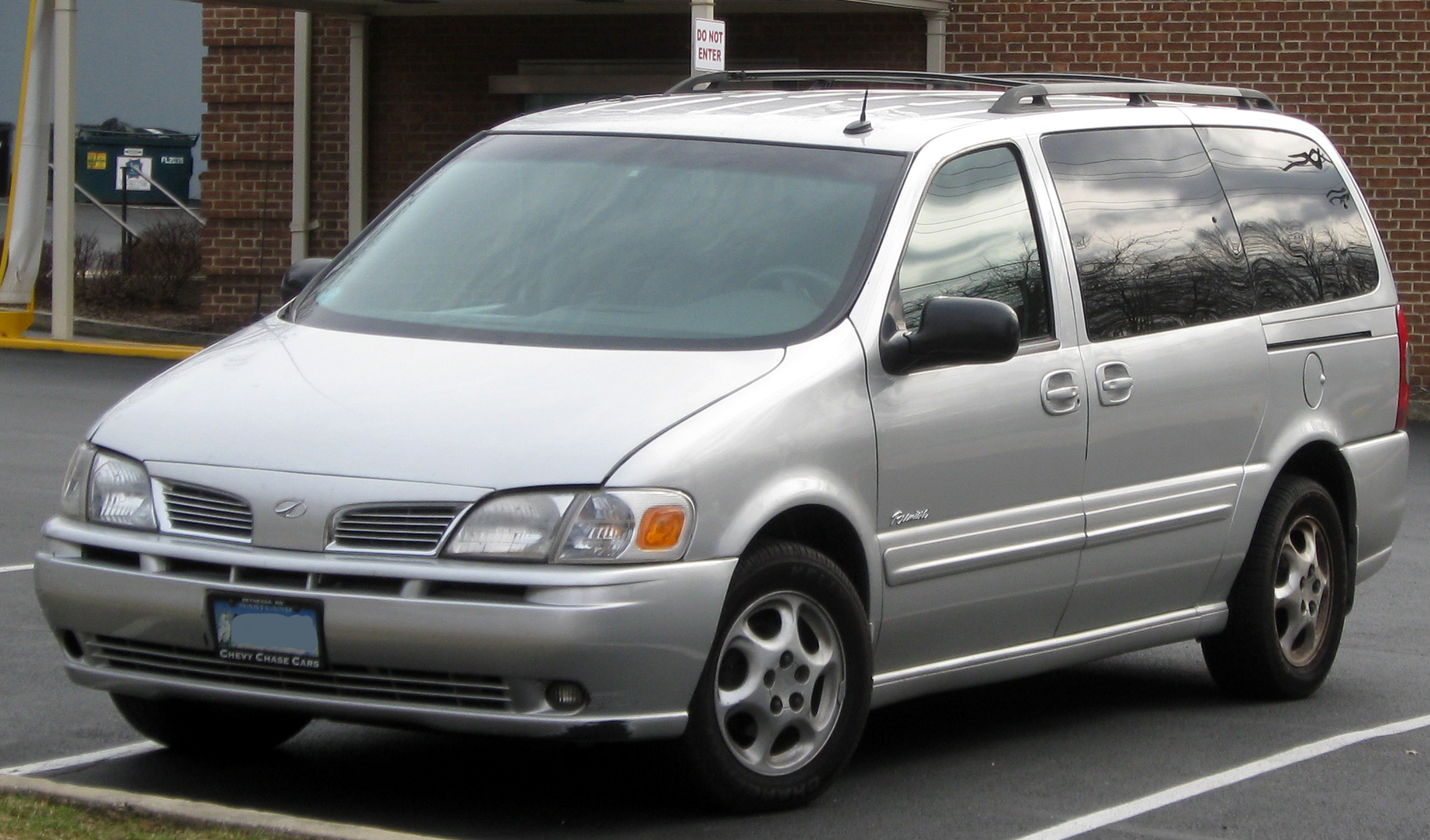

Overview
- Manufacturer: Oldsmobile
- Production: August 1, 1989 – March 31, 2004
- Model years: 1990–2004

Body and chassis
- Class: Minivan
- Platform: U-body
- Related: Pontiac Trans Sport; Pontiac Montana; Opel Sintra; Chevrolet Lumina APV; Chevrolet Venture

Chronology
- Predecessor: Oldsmobile Custom Cruiser
- Successor: Saturn Relay; Buick Terraza

The Oldsmobile Silhouette is a minivan manufactured by General Motors from 1990 to 2004 over two generations.

Production ended when General Motors discontinued its Oldsmobile brand in 2004. GM continued to market badge-engineered variants of the U-body minivans, the Saturn Relay and the Buick Terraza from 2005 to 2007.

== Background ==
General Motors' first attempt at producing a minivan to compete with the Chrysler minivans—the rear-wheel-drive, truck-based Chevrolet Astro and its twin, the GMC Safari—failed to compete strongly against Chrysler's dominance in the minivan market in the 1980s. The 1990 Oldsmobile Silhouette and its sibling models sold more successfully than the Astro/Safari predecessors.

First shown to the public in 1986, the Pontiac Trans Sport concept car featured futuristic styling, individually removable bucket seats with built-in stereo speakers, a gull-wing rear passenger door and extensive use of glass including a glass-paneled roof.

The Trans Sport was approved for production without the gullwing door and the glass roof. Chevrolet and Oldsmobile received production vehicles based on the Trans Sport with the Lumina APV and Silhouette respectively. While the Pontiac Trans Sport was targeted at sport- and style-oriented buyers, the Lumina was the value offering and the Silhouette targeted premium markets, competing with the Chrysler Town & Country.

== First generation (1990–1996) ==
First generation
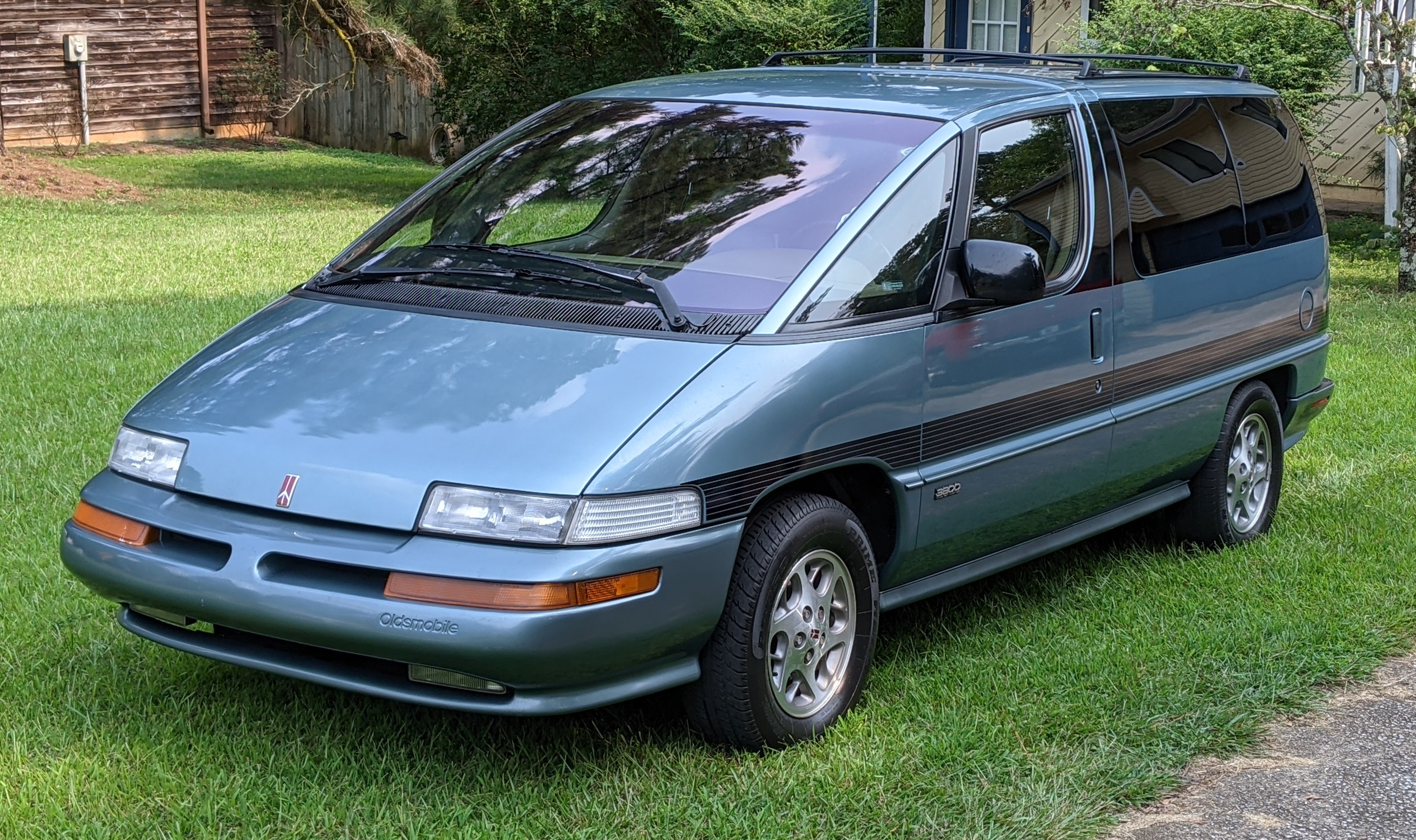

Overview
- Also called: Pontiac Trans Sport (Europe, 1994–1997)
- Production: August 1, 1989 – June 26, 1996
- Model years: 1990–1996
- Assembly: United States: North Tarrytown, New York (North Tarrytown Assembly)

Body and chassis
- Body style: 3-door minivan
- Layout: Transverse front-engine, front-wheel drive
- Platform: U-body/GMT199
- Related: Pontiac Trans Sport; Chevrolet Lumina APV

Powertrain
- Engine: 3.1 L LG6 V6; 3.4 L LA1 V6; 3.8 L L27 V6
- Transmission: 3-speed 3T40 automatic 4-speed 4T60-E automatic

Dimensions
- Wheelbase: 109.8 in (2,789 mm)
- Length: 1989–93: 194.2 in (4,933 mm); 1994–96: 194.7 in (4,945 mm)
- Width: 1989–93: 73.9 in (1,877 mm)
- Height: 1989–91: 65.2 in (1,656 mm); 1992–96: 65.7 in (1,669 mm)
- Curb weight: 3,599–3,899 lb (1,632–1,769 kg)

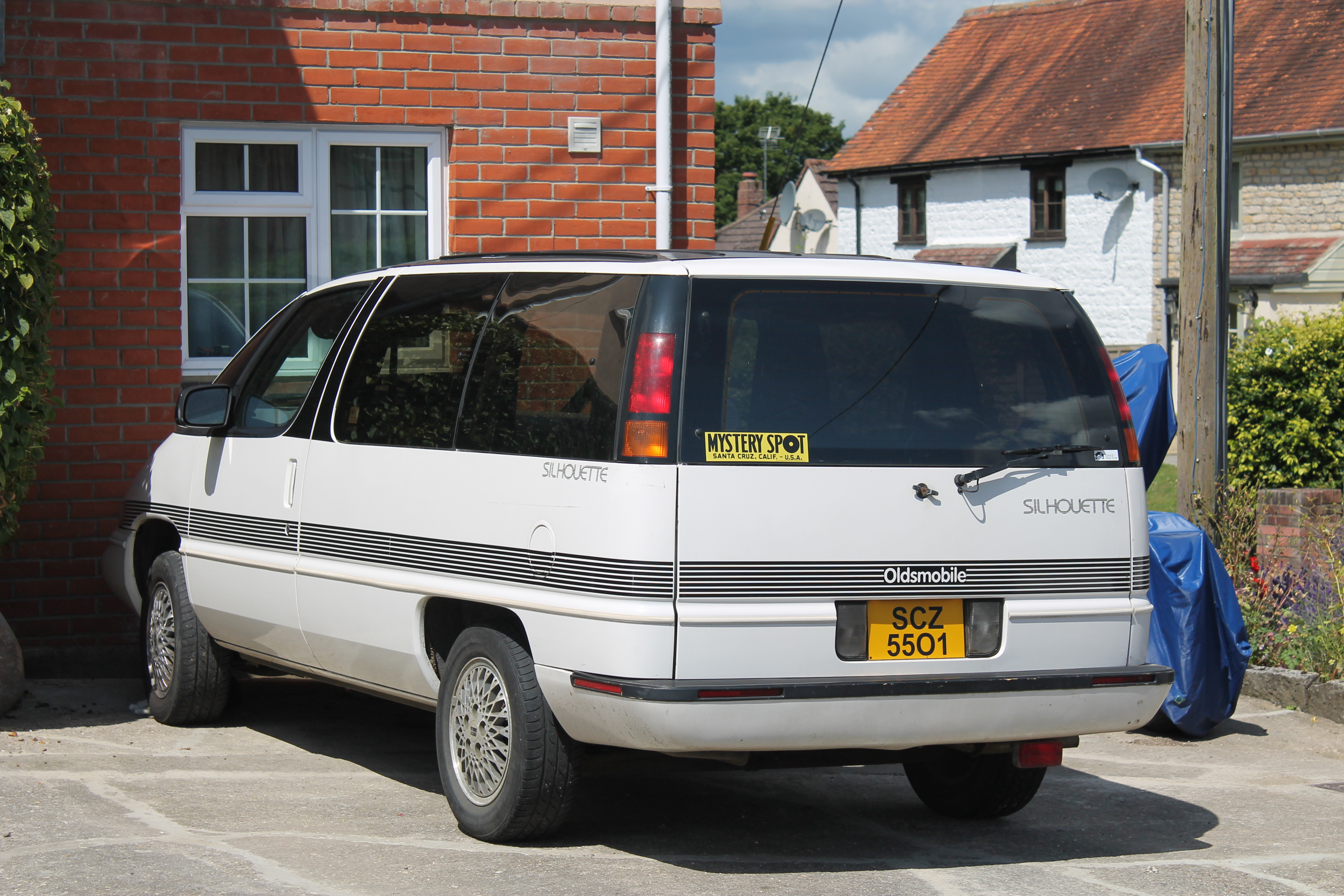
1991 Oldsmobile Silhouette rear

The first 1990 Oldsmobile Silhouette was manufactured on August 1, 1989. Assembled in General Motors' North Tarrytown Assembly assembly facility, these U platform vans consisted of a galvanized steel space frame wrapped in composite plastic body panels that were impervious to rust and minor dents and dings, a manufacturing technique developed on the Pontiac Fiero and also used extensively on General Motors' Saturn line of vehicles.

The Silhouette was available with seating for seven, with the five lightweight (34 lb (15 kg)) rear seats being individually reconfigurable and removable. In 1994, built-in child seats were added to the option list, which provided the ability to switch two of the rear seats between adult and child seating with the pull of a seat-mounted tab.

Included with the level ride package, which utilized a compressor and air-pressurized rear shock absorbers to maintain vehicle height regardless of load, was a control panel and air hose kit that allowed the vehicle to be used to inflate tires, air mattresses, and sporting equipment.

In 1994, a remote-controlled power sliding door feature was added, a General Motors innovation.

For the 1994 and 1995 model years, traction control was available with the 3800 engine option.

The first-generation Silhouette was not available in Canada.

=== European Market ===
Europeans grew accustomed to sleek minivans thanks to the Renault Espace and did not object to the futuristic styling. For the European market, however, the Oldsmobile Silhouette was sold as the Pontiac Trans Sport by replacing the Oldsmobile badging with Pontiac badging, along with Pontiac wheels. Sales in Europe were good for an American import, but did not represent enough volume to make a fourth, distinct model economically feasible. Like the Oldsmobile Silhouette, the European Trans Sport did not receive any facelift, as the vans' initial styling had not been negatively received there.

The Pontiac Trans Sport of Europe was discontinued in 1997. Its successors were both the Chevrolet Trans Sport (a rebadged second-generation Pontiac Trans Sport) (LWB), and the Opel Sintra (SWB). In the United Kingdom, it was sold as the Vauxhall Sintra.

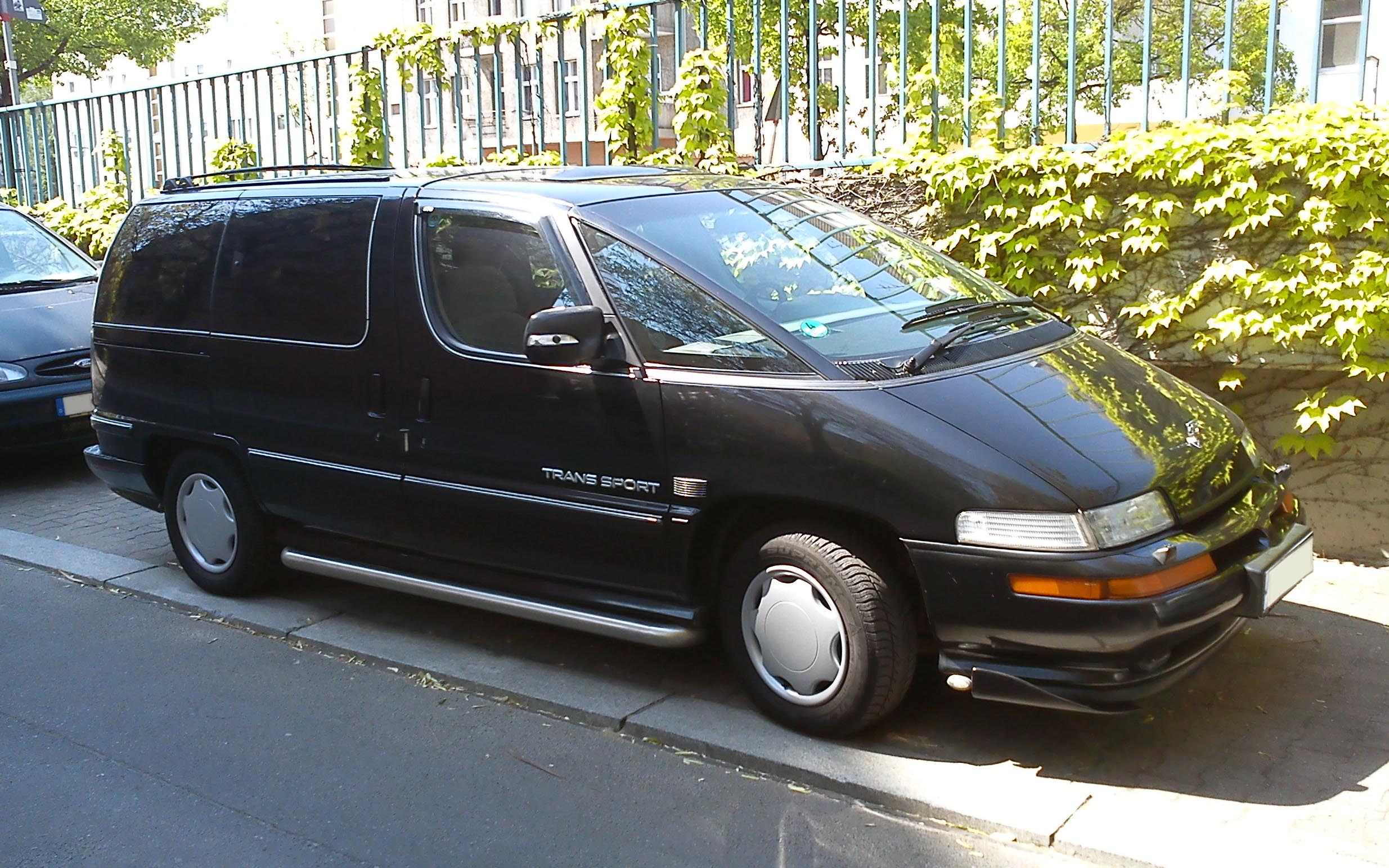
European Pontiac Trans Sport (Front).

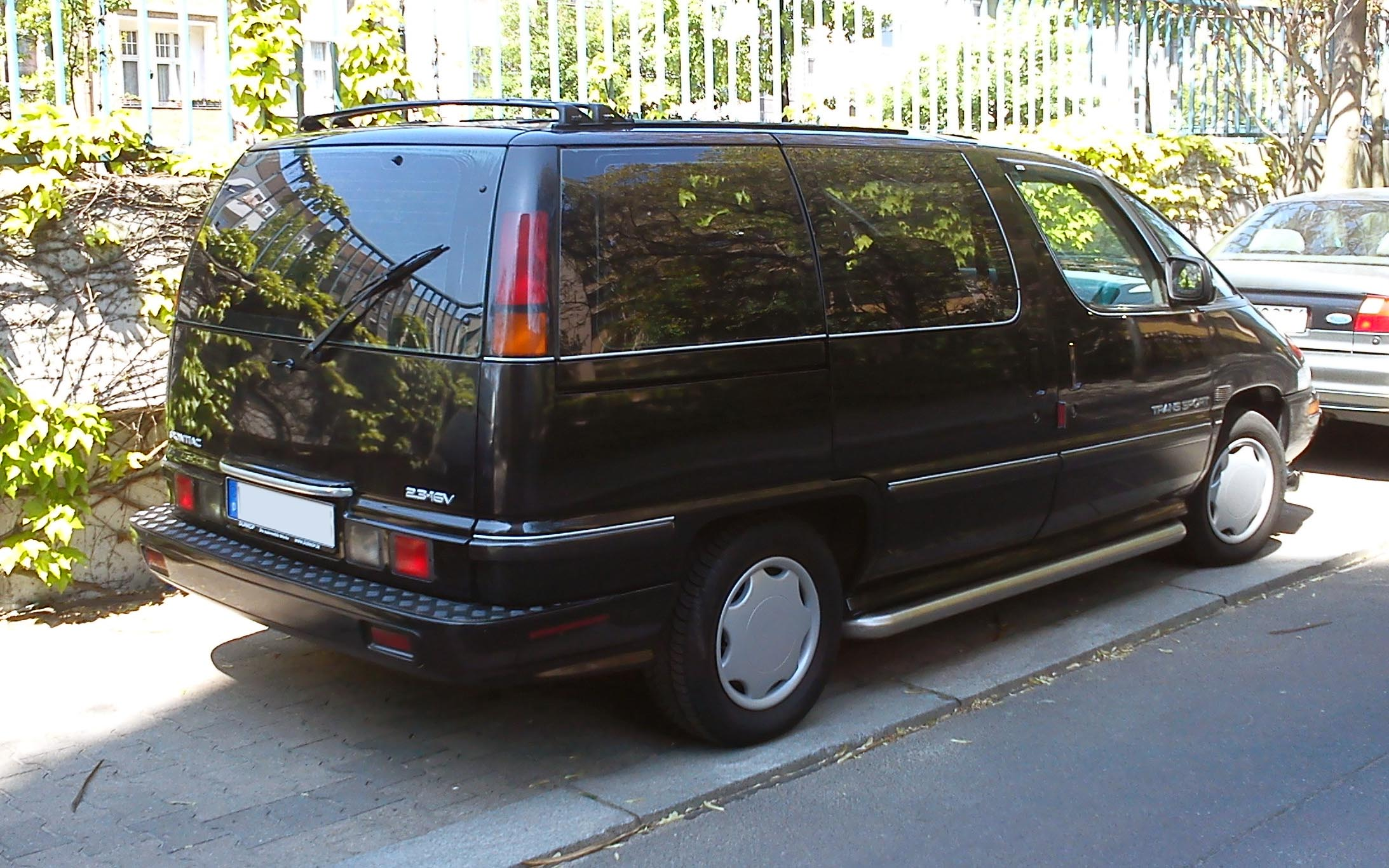
European Pontiac Trans Sport (Rear).

=== Engines ===
- 1990–1995 LG6 3.1 (191 cu in (3.1 L)) V6
- 1992–1995 3800 (231 cu in (3.8 L)) V6 (optional)
- 1996 LA1 3400 (207 cu in (3.4 L)) V6

=== Modest sales success ===
The Oldsmobile Silhouette and its siblings were controversial because they were the first minivans to be marketed as stylish or sporty. While they were lower and sleeker than the competition, the large, long, and sloped windshield made for a disconcerting driving experience until the driver adjusted to the "different" proportions. Automotive magazines dubbed these minivans "dustbusters" after a similar-looking household appliance.

The first engine in these vans was a meager 3.1 L V6, that produced only 120 hp (89 kW), which was not up to the task of hauling these fairly heavy vehicles.

In 1992, the Silhouette and its siblings received the 170 hp (127 kW) 3.8 L 3800 V6 as an option, which provided better torque and acceleration, making them the most powerful minivans then in production.

Production of the first-generation Silhouette and its stablemates ended on June 26, 1996, at which time the Tarrytown, New York, plant which produced them and which had been in operation since 1900, was shuttered and scheduled for demolition.

=== Year to year changes ===
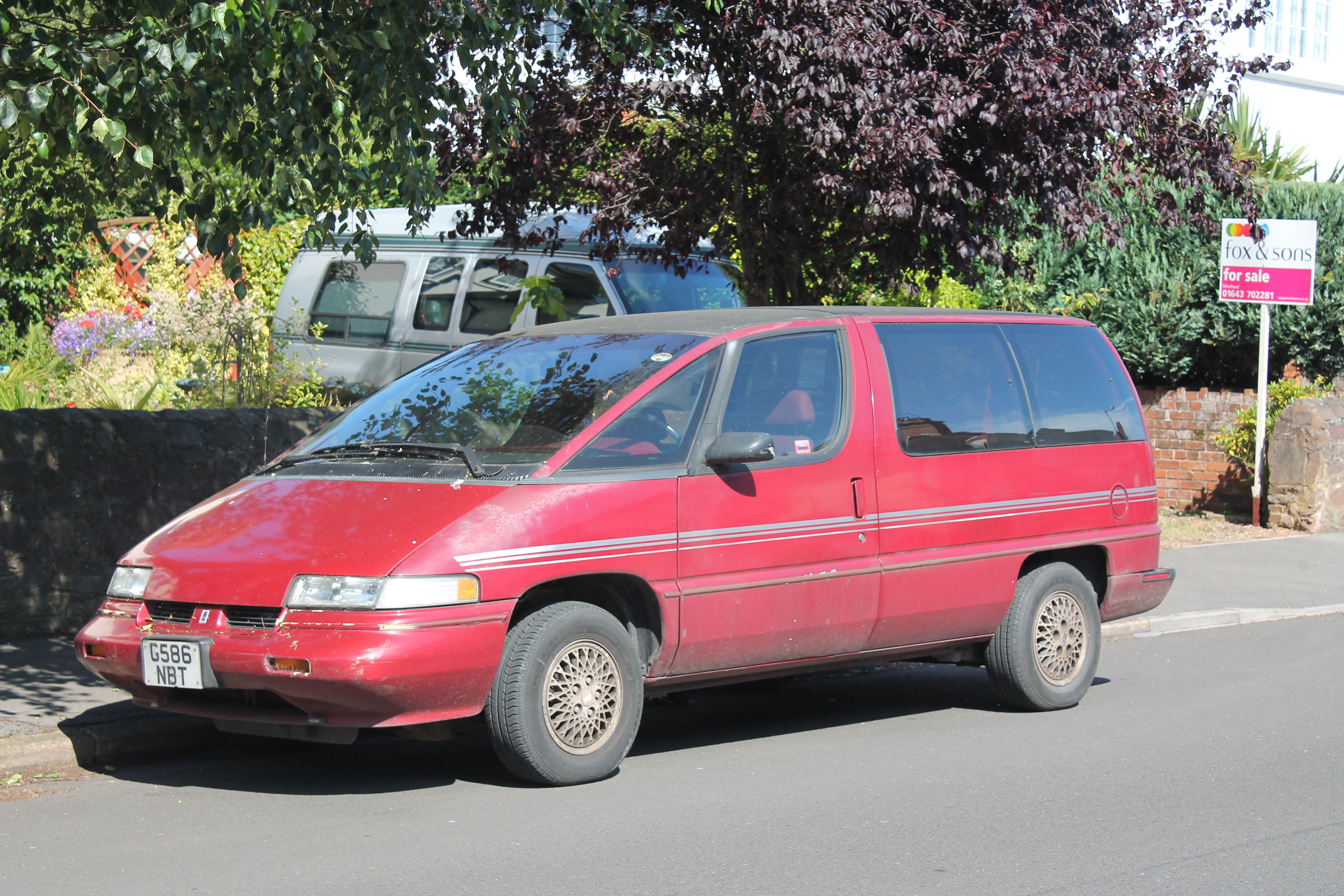
1990–1992 Oldsmobile Silhouette

=== 1990 ===
- All-new model. The Silhouette, in keeping with its positioning as GM's luxury minivan offering, is available with optional leather seating, a feature not available on its platform mates and available only on the Chrysler Town and Country among competing manufacturers' models.

=== 1991 ===
- Black carpeting was added to the dashboard in the place of the more reflective plastic to address customer complaints about glare from the windshield.

=== 1992 ===
- Newly available for 1992 was GM's 3800 V6 engine coupled with a Hydra-Matic 4T60-E 4-speed electronically controlled automatic transmission.
- The cowl-mounted fixed radio antenna was eliminated, and an integrated roof antenna was installed, sandwiched between the roof and the headliner.
- Side-view mirrors were changed to the folding type, and were enlarged to provide better rear visibility.
- Brakes were enlarged and anti-lock brakes (ABS) were added as standard equipment.
- A pop-up sunroof was added to the options list.
- Steering-wheel mounted controls for the stereo system were added as an option.

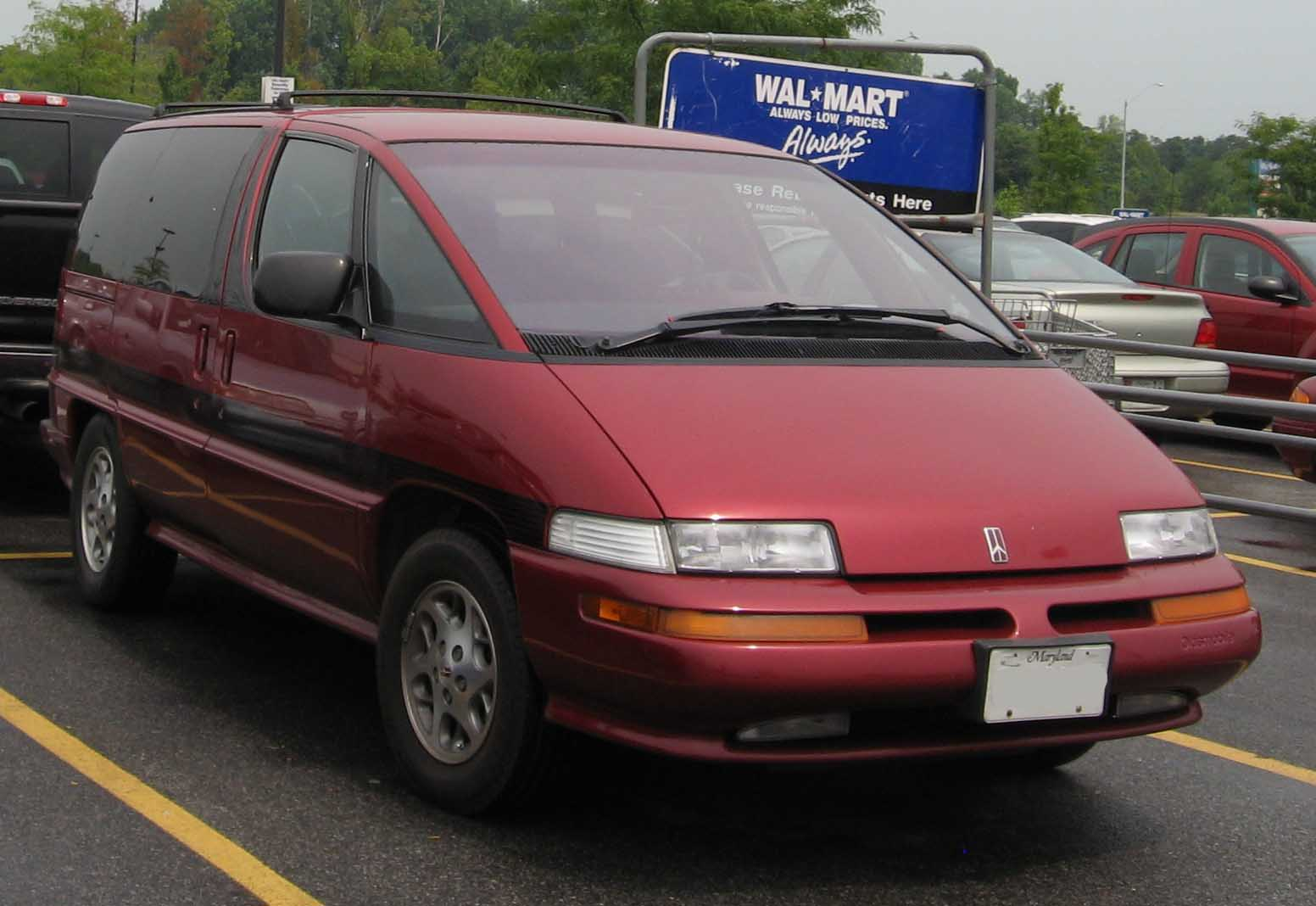
1993–1996 Oldsmobile Silhouette

=== 1993 ===
- The Silhouette's exterior is facelifted, sporting wrap-around turn signal/parking lamps in front, along with standard foglamps.
- Tail lights' design is changed from a grid to a solid red color with black "dissolves" around the edges, a style that had been previously used exclusively on the Pontiac Trans Sport.
- A remote-controlled power sliding side door was announced for 1993, but was never made into production.
- The center console was redesigned with larger climate controls, a large storage cubby, and a large storage bin at its base.

=== 1994 ===
- In an effort to lessen the perceived distance to the base of the windshield, a ridge was added to the interior dash finishing panel.
- A remote-controlled power sliding door became available as an option a year after the announcement.
- Built-in child seats for the second row became available as an option.
- A traction control system became available as an option.
- Rear deep-tinted windows now featured a darker tint than previously used.
- A driver-side airbag became standard equipment.
- A roof rack became standard on all Silhouettes and their subsequent model years, but remained optional on the Chevrolet and Pontiac.
- A third brake light was added, as mandated on light trucks for the 1994 model year.

=== 1995 ===
- Automatic power door locks that engaged/disengaged with the transmission shifting into or out of "park" added as a standard feature of the power door lock option package.

=== 1996 ===
- Final year of production. Replaced in 1997 by an all-new design carrying the same name.
- Both 3.1 and 3.8 L V6 engines were dropped, the 3.4 L 3400 V6 engine became the only engine available.
- Traction control dropped as an option.
- Air conditioning and movable rear seats are now standard.

== Second generation (1997–2004) ==
Second generation
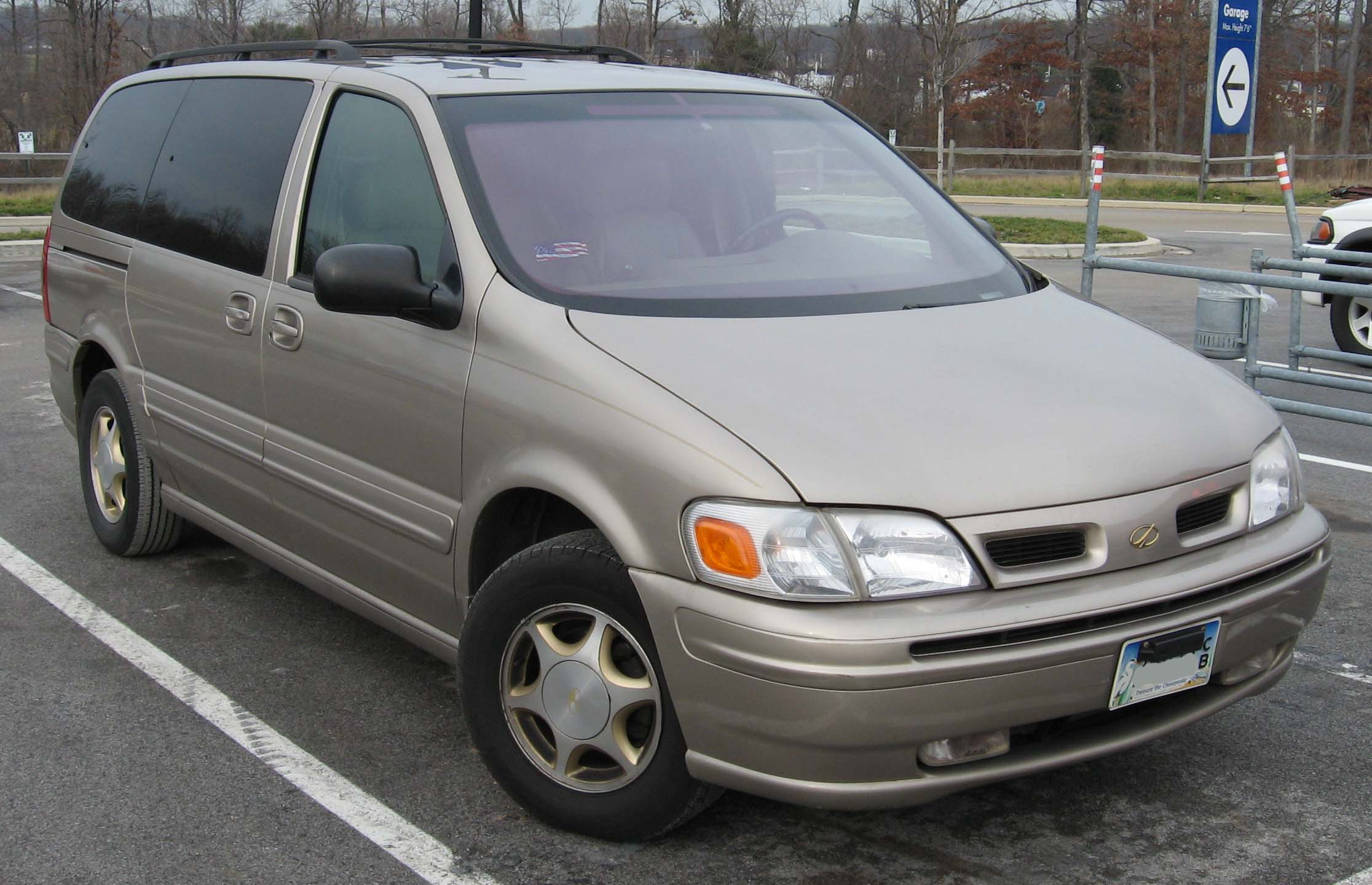

Overview
- Production: August 6, 1996 – March 31, 2004
- Model years: 1997–2004
- Assembly: United States: Doraville, Georgia (Doraville Assembly)

Body and chassis
- Body style: 3-door minivan 4-door minivan
- Layout: Transverse front-engine, front-wheel drive / all-wheel drive
- Platform: U-body/GMT200
- Related: Pontiac Trans Sport; Chevrolet Venture; Pontiac Montana; Buick GL8; Opel Sintra; Vauxhall Sintra; Pontiac Aztek; Buick Rendezvous; Buick Terraza

Powertrain
- Engine: 3.4 L LA1 V6
- Transmission: 4-speed 4T65-E automatic

Dimensions
- Wheelbase: SWB: 112.0 in (2,845 mm); LWB: 120.0 in (3,048 mm)
- Length: SWB: 187.4 in (4,760 mm); LWB: 201.4 in (5,116 mm)
- Width: 72.2 in (1,834 mm)
- Height: SWB: 67.4 in (1,712 mm); LWB: 68.1 in (1,730 mm)
- Curb weight: 3,710–3,832 lb (1,683–1,738 kg)

The redesigned 1997 Silhouette was built at Doraville Assembly like other U-body based minivans. Canadian sales began as a 1998 model. The first Silhouettes were assembled in August 1996.

Having achieved second place in sales to Chrysler, General Motors brought out an entirely new U platform series of minivans, theoretically based on the lessons learned from its previous missteps. Reeling from the criticisms of the previous "dustbuster" minivans, the new Silhouette would be completely redesigned as conventional in all respects. The vehicle consisted of steel unibody construction, and the styling would be as conservative as possible. The previous generation was also a little too large for comfortably navigating European streets, so this new range of models would be narrower and slightly smaller than was the norm for the United States in order to produce a single range of minivans that GM hoped would fill the needs of both the North American and European markets. At this time, GM continued to offer the Silhouette as their premium luxurious minivan, while the Trans Sport/Montana and the Venture were offered as the mid-ranged sporty and basic value-oriented versions respectively.

During the development of this generation of the U-body minivan, General Motors extensively benchmarked the then current Chrysler minivans. The resultant vehicles more closely resembled the immensely successful trio of Chrysler minivans; However, Chrysler would launch a completely redesigned minivan line a year before GM.

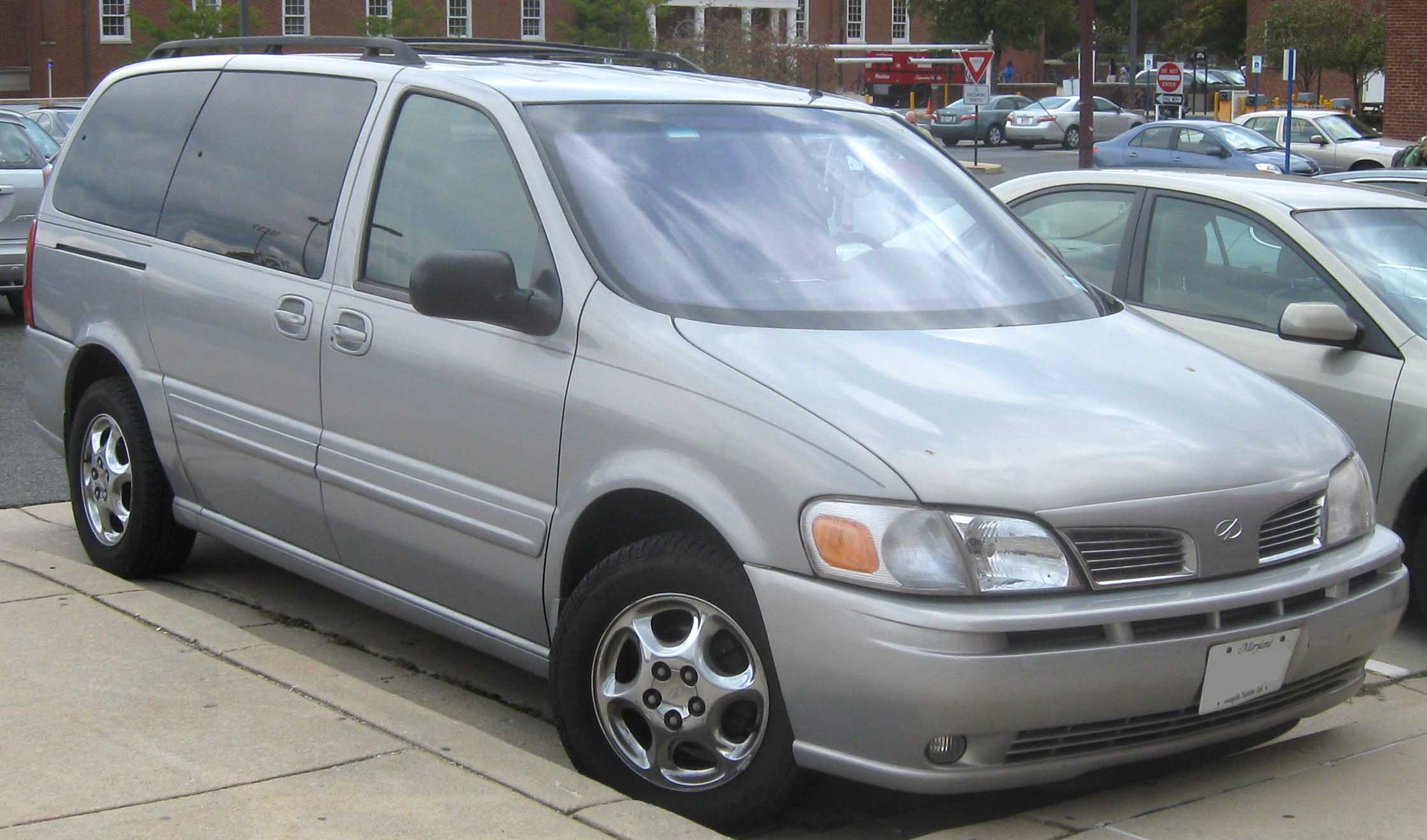
2001–2004 Oldsmobile Silhouette

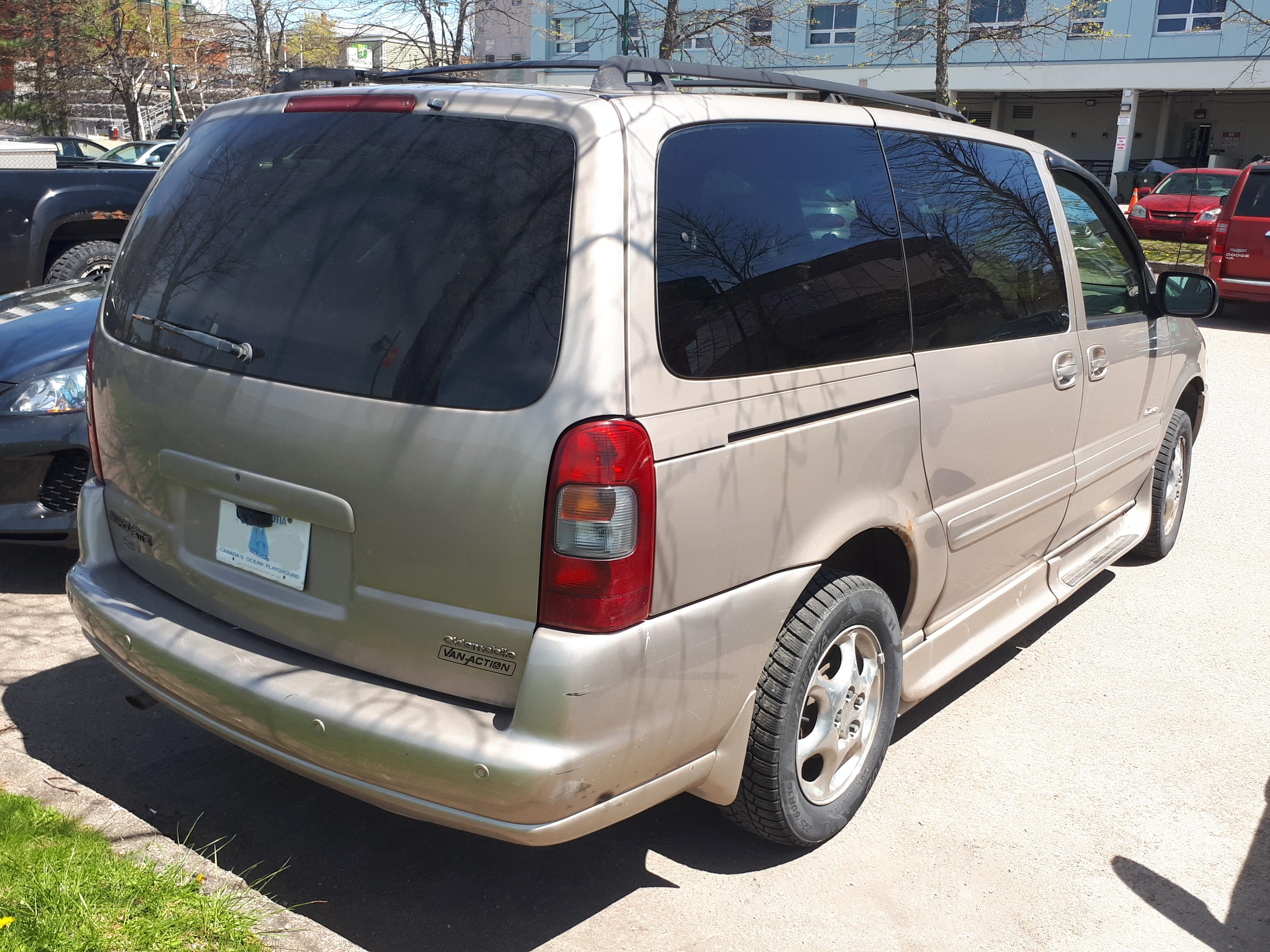
Back end of 2001-2004 model

Two different wheelbase lengths were offered as well as dual sliding doors. The base model (only offered for 1997) was the only model to offer short-wheelbase and a driver side sliding door being only optional, when all the other trim levels of the Silhouette were in long-wheelbase extended version and offered a standard driver side sliding door.

Unlike with the Venture and Trans Sport/Montana, the roof rack was standard on all Silhouettes. New for this generation were cabin air filters, and the filters can be accessed from behind an access panel easily accessed from inside the glove compartment.

Silhouettes, in keeping with their luxury positioning, offered many features as standard that were optional on competing makes and on its platform mates. In 1998, it became one of the first vehicles on the market to offer a DVD player with overhead retractable LCD screen for back seat viewing, which has since become a "must-have" option for families with children. For 2001, the Silhouette received a minor facelift that included a new grille and front bumper.

=== Trim levels ===
- Base (1997)
- GL (1997–2004) – Included: Cloth upholstery, 15" steel rims with hubcaps, air conditioning, map pockets in driver and passenger seats, power driver's seat, storage drawer under passenger front seat, an AM/FM stereo with single-CD player and seek-scan tuning, coaxial speakers, and clock, overhead console, fog lamps, and power front windows with automatic driver's side window. Later standard features were an AM/FM stereo with single-CD and cassette players and speed-compensated volume control, TheftLock, and clock, a garage door opener, rear seat audio controls, keyless entry, heated power mirrors, and automatic headlamps.
- GLS (1997–2004) – Added: leather upholstery, rear parking aid, tri-zone climate control system, rear seat audio/climate controls, compass, garage door opener, an AM/FM stereo with single-CD and cassette players, seek-scan tuning, coaxial speakers and clock, leather wrapped steering wheel with audio controls, power front seats with driver's side memory, 16-inch alloy rims, and power sliding passenger door.
- GS (1998–1999)
- Premiere (1998–2004) – Added: Entertainment system with DVD player with fold-down overhead color monitor for rear passengers, input jacks for video games or camcorders, 4 pairs of wireless headphones and rear seat visual/audio controls, heated front seats, and power sliding driver's side door.

=== Engine ===
The engine was a 3.4 L LA1 3400 (207 cu in (3.4 L)) V6 engine that was shared with the Chevrolet Venture and the Pontiac Trans Sport/Montana.

=== Safety criticism ===
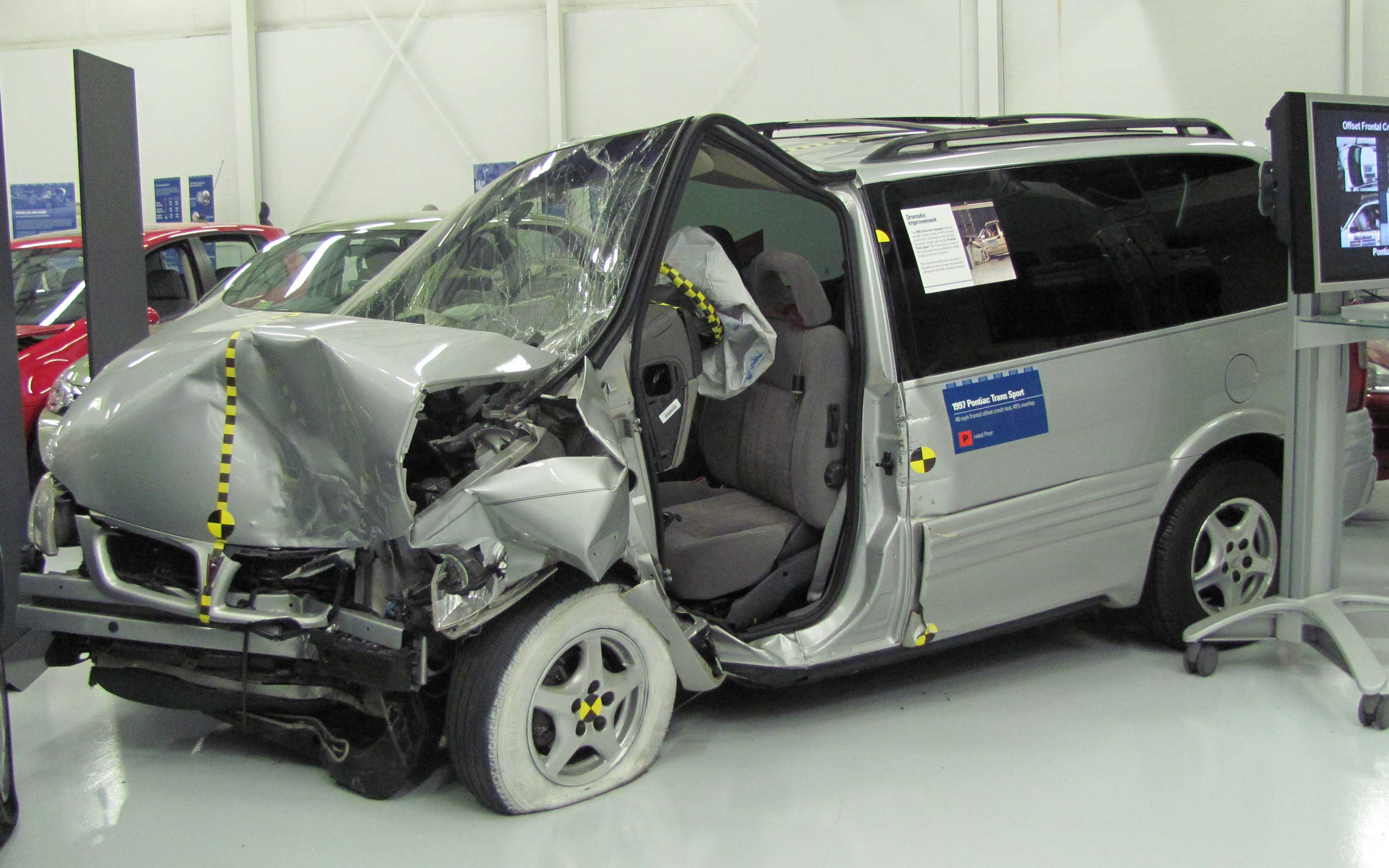
The 1997 Pontiac Trans Sport crash-tested by the Insurance Institute for Highway Safety

In 1996, the Insurance Institute for Highway Safety (IIHS) crash tested a 1997 Pontiac Trans Sport among other minivans of the time. The minivan suffered extreme damage to the vehicle in the 40 mph (64 km/h) moderate overlap crash test, which has resulted in some criticism by contemporary reviewers. The minivan received a "Poor" rating and was ranked as the "Worst Performing Vehicle" by the institute as a result. This status was also applied to the Chevrolet Venture and the Oldsmobile Silhouette as they both use the same chassis and body design, including the later first-generation Pontiac Montana.

Some comments made by the IIHS after the first test in 1996 were:

- Major collapse of the occupant compartment left little survival space for the driver.
- Extreme steering wheel movement snapped the dummy's head backward.
- The unnatural position of the dummy's left foot indicates that an occupant's left leg would have been seriously injured in a real-world crash of this severity.
- The forces on the left lower leg were so high that the dummy's metal foot broke off at the ankle.

In a semi-related event, the European equivalent of the Silhouette, the Opel/Vauxhall Sintra, also fared badly in Euro NCAP's frontal impact crash test on a 1998 model year minivan, made worse by the steering wheel (and airbag) breaking off from the dashboard (a phenomenon that was not present in the IIHS test). Despite performing well in the side impact test, it rated 2.5 stars as a result.

The safety issues of the Silhouette and its U-body siblings were later addressed with the third-generation redesign (consisting of the Montana SV6 and the related Uplander, Terraza and Relay models), which earned the highest rating of "Good" given by the institute in the moderate overlap crash test.

The National Highway Traffic Safety Administration gave the van 4 stars for driver protection and 3 stars for passenger protection in the 35 mph (56 km/h) frontal impact test. In the side impact test, it received 5 stars for front passenger protection, and 5 stars rear passenger protection. This applies to all other second-generation U-body minivans.

More information on the Oldsmobile Silhouette/Pontiac Trans Sport:

=== Mixed sales success ===
The Silhouette and its platform mates achieved slightly better sales than their avant-garde predecessors, but also failed to capture a significant share of the market. While the Silhouette was a close competitor in many of the key categories, it was also a winner in luxury, as it was one of the first minivans to offer a factory video entertainment system.

The minivan market had become significantly more crowded with competing products that proved to be more desirable, and throughout the Silhouette's production, it was widely considered a second-tier competitor, certainly competent but not a stand-out in any category.

The Silhouette remained in production until the 2004 model year with minimal changes. As Oldsmobile itself was gradually phased out with slowing sales, a limited run of 500 units, dubbed Final 500, of each of the brand's five remaining models were built and sold. The Silhouette received the Final 500 edition as well, applied exclusively to the Premiere trim. It featured a Dark Cherry Metallic paint, like the Alero, Bravada, Aurora, and Intrigue, custom vintage Oldsmobile badging on the front fenders and rear liftgate, Final 500 embroidered seat backs for the front and middle row (unique to the Final 500 Silhouettes) and front floor mats, and Aurora-styled chrome wheels. However, as production capacity was constrained by fleet order obligations of its siblings, only 360 out of the 500 Silhouettes were built. Production of the Silhouette ended on March 31, 2004.

=== Successors and decline ===
The spiritual successor to the Oldsmobile Silhouette within the General Motors lineup is the Buick Terraza (2005–2007), which was built on an updated version of the U platform and occupied the luxury minivan slot previously occupied by the Silhouette.

However, due to poor sales of all the third-generation GM minivans in the United States, GM decided to exit the minivan market altogether in that region. Production of the Pontiac Montana SV6 ended after the 2006 model year in the United States, the Buick Terraza and Saturn Relay ended after the 2007 model year, and for the Chevrolet Uplander, production ceased in the United States after the 2008 model year and focused on the new crossover vehicle market. However, production of the Uplander and Montana SV6 continued in Mexico and Canada until 2009 since they were still fairly popular in those countries.

=== One-Off Variants ===
- Silhouette OSV (1999) – A modified version of the Silhouette that was created as part of "Oldsmobile Specialty Vehicles", an experiment in an aftermarket tuning brand for Oldsmobile. It debuted at the 1999 SEMA show alongside the OSV Alero and OSV Intrigue. It features: 3.4L SFI V6 engine with tuned intake and headers that produces 210 hp @ 4400rpm, 270 lb-ft torque @ 2800rpm, 4-speed Hydramatic 4T60-E automatic transmission, 19 in × 8 in (480 mm × 200 mm) RH Evolution C6 wheels, 13-inch Brembo cross-drilled 4-wheel disc brakes, Koni struts and springs, front and rear spoilers, ground effects package, K&N filtration, and Borla exhaust. On the exterior, the OSV Silhouette features a ground effects package similar to its OSV siblings, Candy Apple Red paint with ghosted Oldsmobile Tilted Rocket logos on the rear quarter panels, an OSV badge between the wheel wells and front doors, and silver inserts that block out the minivan's twin grille. Inside, the OSV is largely the same as its OSV siblings, sporting climate-controlled, 8-position Recaro Style seats, trimmed in neutral and red leather, and Titanium pedals. Unique to the OSV Silhouette is the fact that all of its seats are Recaro Style seats. All the headrests of the seats have the OSV logo embroidered into the headrests, like the OSV Alero and OSV Intrigue. It was sold in 2009 at the Barrett-Jackson Scottsdale auction, and again in 2012. In December 2020, an article by Hagerty reported that the OSV Silhouette was found listed for sale at Empire Motors in Canada. According the article, three OSV Silhouettes were built. The OSV Silhouette featured in the article has since been sold.
- Silhouette OSV II (2000) – Another Silhouette modified for OSV, this time painted dark green. Little information exists on the Silhouette OSV II, but it appears largely the same as the Silhouette OSV I. It is part of a second batch of OSVs alongside the Alero OSV II and Intrigue OSV II. Like the other OSV II models, the whereabouts of the Silhouette OSV II are unknown.
