= Oldsmobile Custom Cruiser =

Car model produced by Oldsmobile from 1971 to 1992

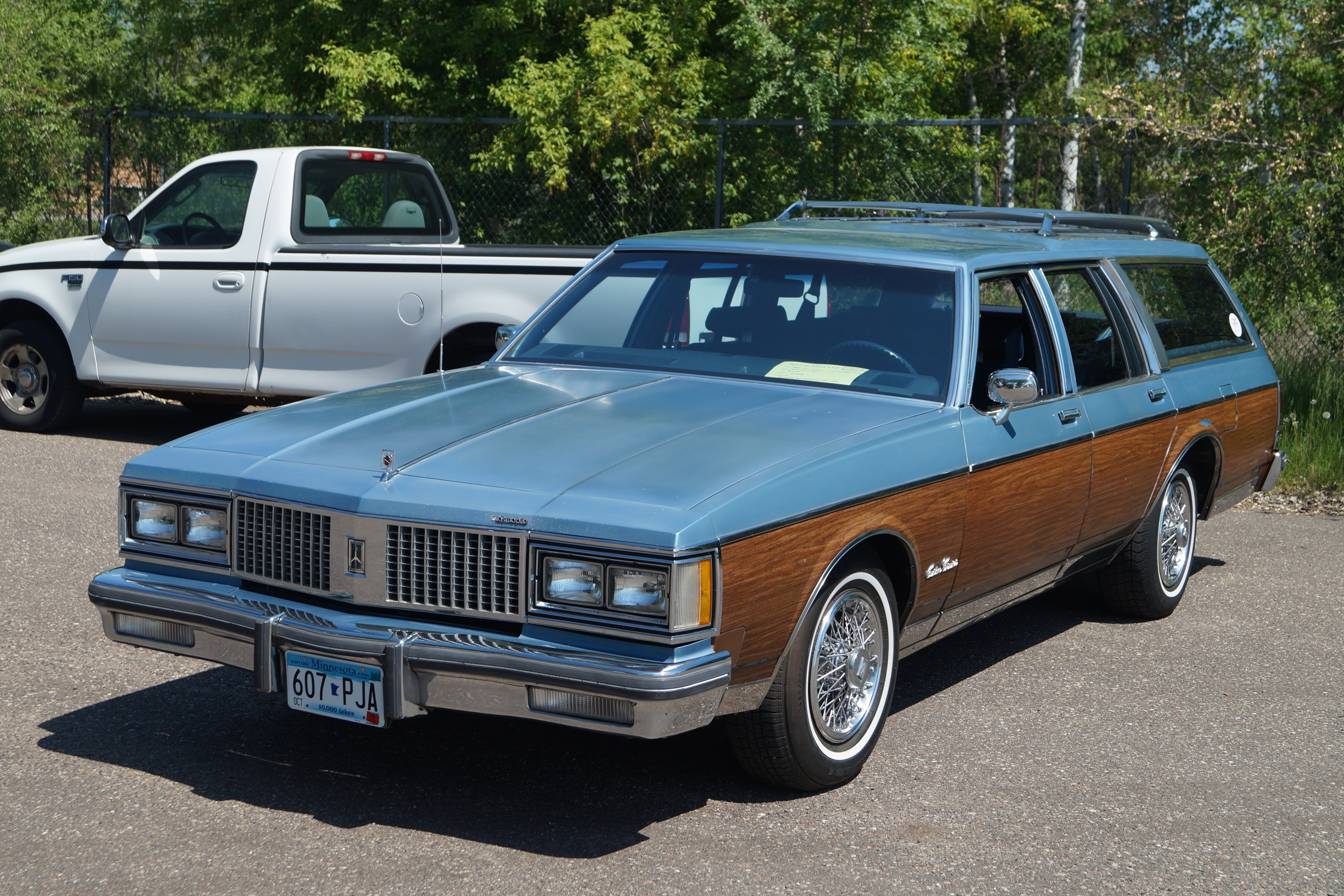
- 1989 Oldsmobile Custom Cruiser

Overview
- Manufacturer: Oldsmobile (General Motors)
- Model years: 1971–1992

Body and chassis
- Body style: 5-door station wagon
- Layout: FR layout
- Platform: GM B platform
- Related: Buick Estate

Chronology
- Predecessor: Oldsmobile 88 Fiesta (1964)

The Oldsmobile Custom Cruiser is an automobile that was manufactured and marketed by Oldsmobile from 1971 until 1992. Marking the return of Oldsmobile to the full-size station wagon segment, the Custom Cruiser was initially slotted above the intermediate Oldsmobile Vista Cruiser, ultimately above the later mid-size Oldsmobile Cutlass Cruiser.

For three generations, the Custom Cruiser shared the General Motors B platform with the Buick Estate, Pontiac Safari, and the Chevrolet Caprice (initially Chevrolet Kingswood) station wagons. Within Oldsmobile, the Custom Cruiser shared its trim with the Oldsmobile Delta 88 and Oldsmobile Ninety-Eight. During 1985 and 1986, all three GM mid-price divisions downsized their B-platform full-size sedans, leaving the Custom Cruiser with no sedan counterpart. After the discontinuation of the Cutlass Supreme Classic, the model line became the sole Oldsmobile sold with rear-wheel drive.

Following the 1992 model year, production of the Custom Cruiser was discontinued. Alongside an extensive redesign for 1991, Oldsmobile had already initiated station wagon alternatives, introducing both the Oldsmobile Silhouette minivan (1990) and Oldsmobile Bravada mid-size SUV (1991). In total, Oldsmobile produced 451,819 Custom Cruisers over 21 years. Following the discontinuation of the model line, GM ended full-size station wagon production after 1996, becoming the final American-brand manufacturer to do so at the time.

== First use of name ==
The Custom Cruiser nameplate was introduced by Oldsmobile in 1940, as the division introduced formal names for its vehicles for the first time, introducing the flagship Custom Cruiser 90. For 1941, the model line was offered with both inline-6 and inline-8 engines, with Oldsmobile renaming it as the Custom Cruiser 96 and Custom Cruiser 98.

For 1942, the Custom Cruiser 96 was dropped, leaving the 98 as the flagship Oldsmobile. Dropping the Custom Cruiser name after 1947, the 98 (later renamed Ninety-Eight) remained on the C-body chassis through its 1996 discontinuation.

Following the introduction of the Vista Cruiser and the return of the Custom Cruiser, Oldsmobile expanded the use of the "Cruiser" nameplate across many of its 1970s and 1980s station wagon lines, including the Cutlass (Supreme) Cruiser, Firenza Cruiser, and Cutlass Cruiser (Cutlass Ciera).

== First generation (1971–1976) ==
First generation
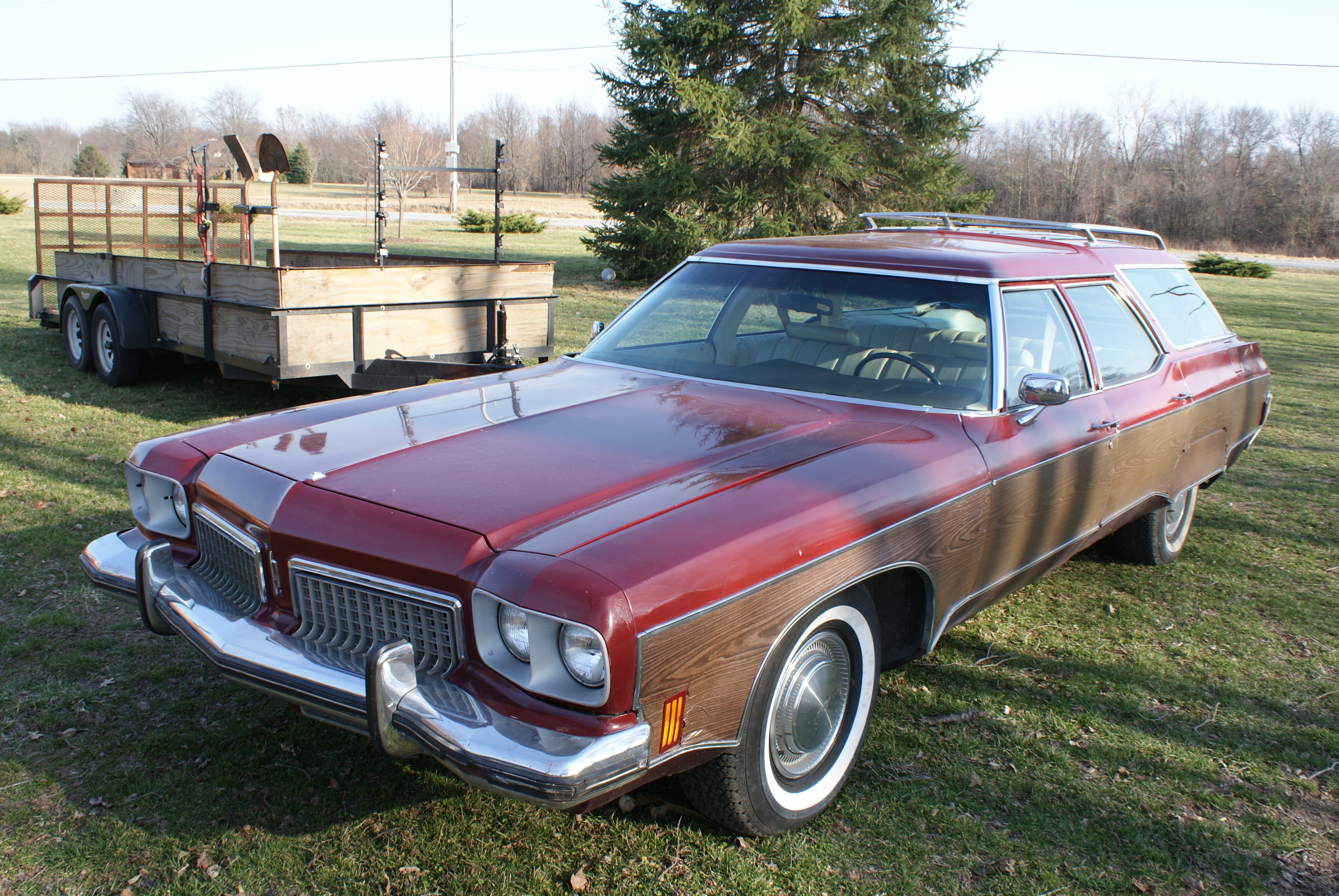
- 1973 Oldsmobile Custom Cruiser

Overview
- Model years: 1971–1976
- Assembly: Lansing, Michigan, United States (Lansing Car Assembly); Kansas City, Kansas, United States (Fairfax Assembly)
- Designer: Bill Mitchell

Body and chassis
- Class: Station wagon (full-size)
- Body style: 5-door station wagon
- Layout: FR layout
- Platform: GM C-body/B-body combination
- Related: Buick Estate; Pontiac Grand Safari; Pontiac Safari; Chevrolet Caprice Estate

Powertrain
- Engine: 400 cu in (6.6 L) Pontiac V8; 455 cu in (7.5 L) Rocket V8
- Transmission: 3-speed TH-400 automatic

Dimensions
- Wheelbase: 127.0 in (3,226 mm)
- Length: 1971: 225.3 in (5,723 mm); 1972: 227.0 in (5,766 mm); 1973: 228.3 in (5,799 mm); 1974–75: 231.2 in (5,872 mm); 1976: 231.0 in (5,867 mm)
- Width: 1971–75: 79.5 in (2,019 mm); 1976: 80.0 in (2,032 mm)
- Height: 1971–75: 57.2 in (1,453 mm); 1976: 57.1 in (1,450 mm)
- Curb weight: 5,100–5,400 lb (2,300–2,400 kg)

For the 1971 model year, full-size station wagons returned to the Oldsmobile product range (for the first time since 1964), coinciding with the redesign of GM full-size product range. In place of the previous Fiesta name used for Oldsmobile station wagons, the Custom Cruiser name was revived, slotting it above the A-body Vista Cruiser wagon. Sharing its body with the Buick Estate and Pontiac Safari (Grand Safari), the Custom Cruiser was slightly longer than Chevrolet Impala/Caprice station wagons.

Though designed without the distinctive glass roof panels of the Vista Cruiser, the Custom Cruiser and its counterparts shared its interior layout; the optional third-row seat was faced forward. Similar to the Chevrolet Suburban, the third-row seat was accessed by a split second-row bench seat that folded forward, expanding seating to eight passengers.

Following the fitment of 5 mph bumpers, the 1974–1976 Custom Cruiser grew to over 19 feet long, becoming one of the longest vehicles ever built by Oldsmobile.

=== Chassis ===
The Custom Cruiser (and its Buick and Pontiac counterparts) used the GM B-body chassis, extended to the 127-inch wheelbase used by the GM C-body platform (used by the Oldsmobile Ninety-Eight and Buick Electra). In contrast to GM B/C/D-platform vehicles of the time, GM 1971–1976 full-size station wagons used a rear suspension of multi-leaf rear springs (in line with the C/K trucks of the time).

At 5,161 lb (2,341 kg) shipping weight (5,186 lb (2,352 kg) with woodgrain), or about 5,400 lb (2,400 kg) curb weight, the three-seat 1974 Custom Cruiser wagons are the heaviest Oldsmobiles ever built. Along with similar versions of the Buick Estate, the model line also serves as the heaviest sedan-based GM vehicle ever produced. The Custom Cruiser used the longest wheelbase in its segment, besting all Chrysler wagons (124 inches), the AMC Ambassador (122 inches), and Ford/Mercury wagons (121 inches).

==== Powertrain ====
Oldsmobile offered the 455 cubic-inch Rocket V8 in various states of tune from 1971 until 1976 (the "Rocket" brand itself was discontinued in 1975). A 190 hp 400 cubic-inch Pontiac V8 was offered for 1975.

From 1971 to 1976, the model line was offered solely with the GM Turbo-Hydramatic 400 3-speed automatic transmission.

1971–1976 Oldsmobile Custom Cruiser powertrain details
Engine name	Configuration	Year(s) produced	Output (SAE net)		Carburetor	Transmission
Engine name	Configuration	Year(s) produced	Power	Torque	Carburetor	Transmission
Oldsmobile Rocket V8	7.5 L (455 cu in) OHV 16V V8	1971	185 hp (138 kW)	355 lb⋅ft (481 N⋅m)	2bbl	THM 400 3-speed automatic
Oldsmobile Rocket V8	7.5 L (455 cu in) OHV 16V V8	1971–1973	225 hp (168 kW)	360 lb⋅ft (488 N⋅m)	4bbl	THM 400 3-speed automatic
Oldsmobile Rocket V8	7.5 L (455 cu in) OHV 16V V8	1972	250 hp (186 kW)	370 lb⋅ft (502 N⋅m)	4bbl	THM 400 3-speed automatic
Oldsmobile Rocket V8	7.5 L (455 cu in) OHV 16V V8	1973	210 hp (157 kW)	350 lb⋅ft (475 N⋅m)	4bbl	THM 400 3-speed automatic
Oldsmobile Rocket V8	7.5 L (455 cu in) OHV 16V V8	1974	275 hp (205 kW)	395 lb⋅ft (536 N⋅m)	4bbl	THM 400 3-speed automatic
Pontiac V8	6.6 L (400 cu in) OHV 16V V8	1975	190 hp (142 kW)	350 lb⋅ft (475 N⋅m)	4bbl	THM 400 3-speed automatic
Oldsmobile V8	7.5 L (455 cu in) OHV 16V V8	1975–1976	190 hp (142 kW)	350 lb⋅ft (475 N⋅m)	4bbl	THM 400 3-speed automatic

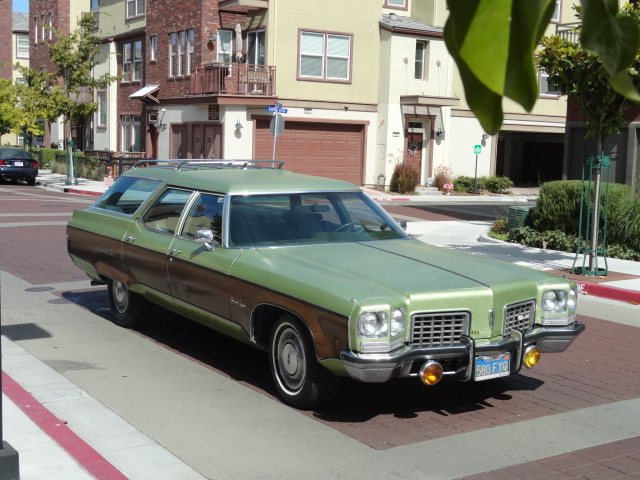
1972 Oldsmobile Custom Cruiser

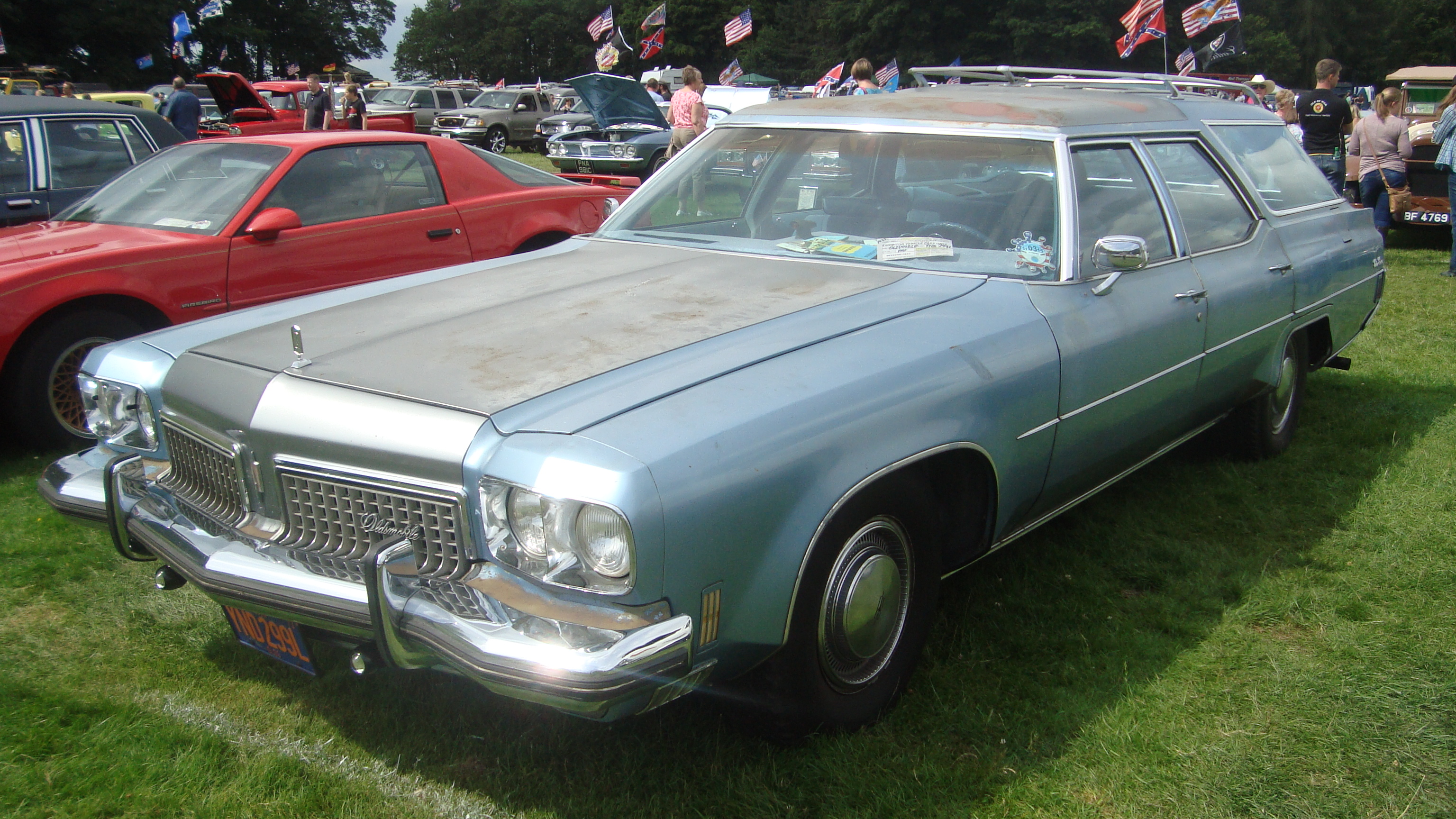
1973 Oldsmobile Custom Cruiser

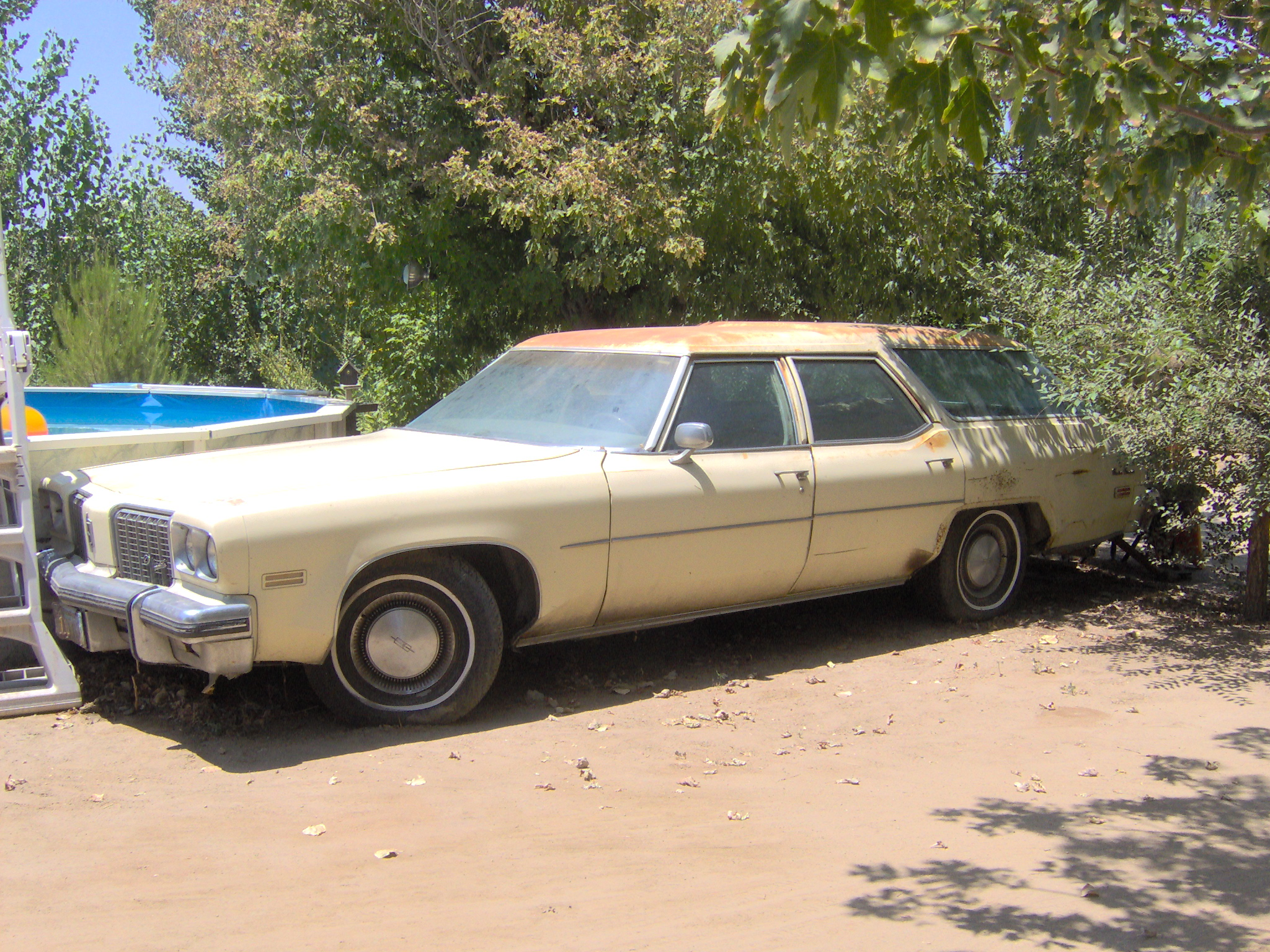
1974 Oldsmobile Custom Cruiser

=== Body ===
While sharing its roofline and doors with its divisional counterparts, the body of the Custom Cruiser was styled as a hybrid of the B-body Delta 88 and the C-body Ninety-Eight, using components from both model lines. From the Ninety-Eight, the Custom Cruiser shared its front fascia and rear quarter panels (and rear fender skirts); the interior adopted trim elements from both the Delta 88 and Ninety-Eight.

In line with the Vista Cruiser, simulated woodgrain trim was offered as an option, with nearly 80% of buyers selecting the feature.

During its production, the Custom Cruiser followed the exterior design of Ninety-Eight, receiving a new front bumper for 1972; front and rear 5-mph bumpers were adding during 1973 and 1974, respectively. For 1974, the grille underwent a redesign.

For 1976, the Custom Cruiser received a second revision. Largely a preview of the 1977 Oldsmobile 98, the fascia was given four square headlights with outboard marker lights.

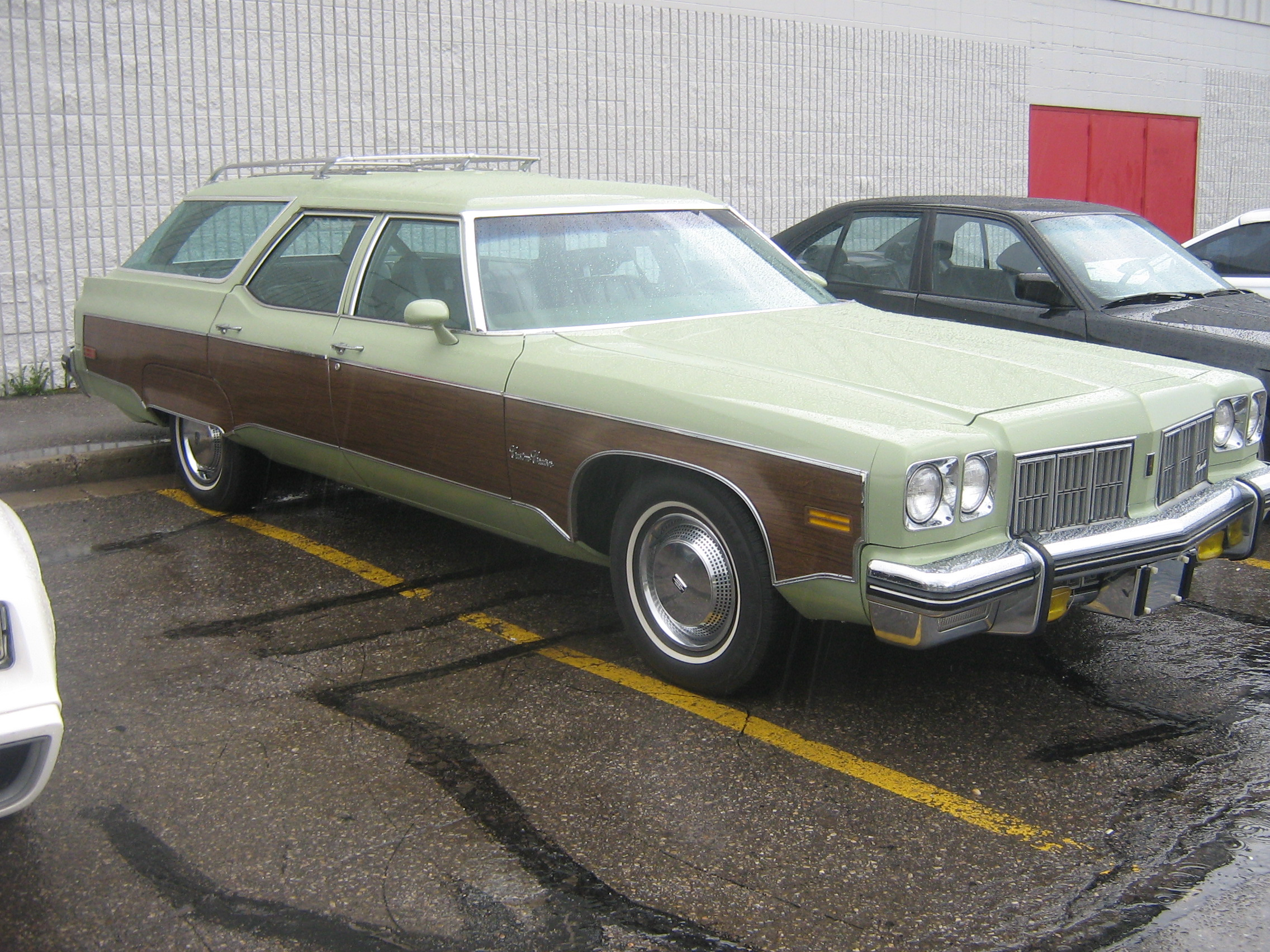
1975 Oldsmobile Custom Cruiser

==== Clamshell tailgate design ====
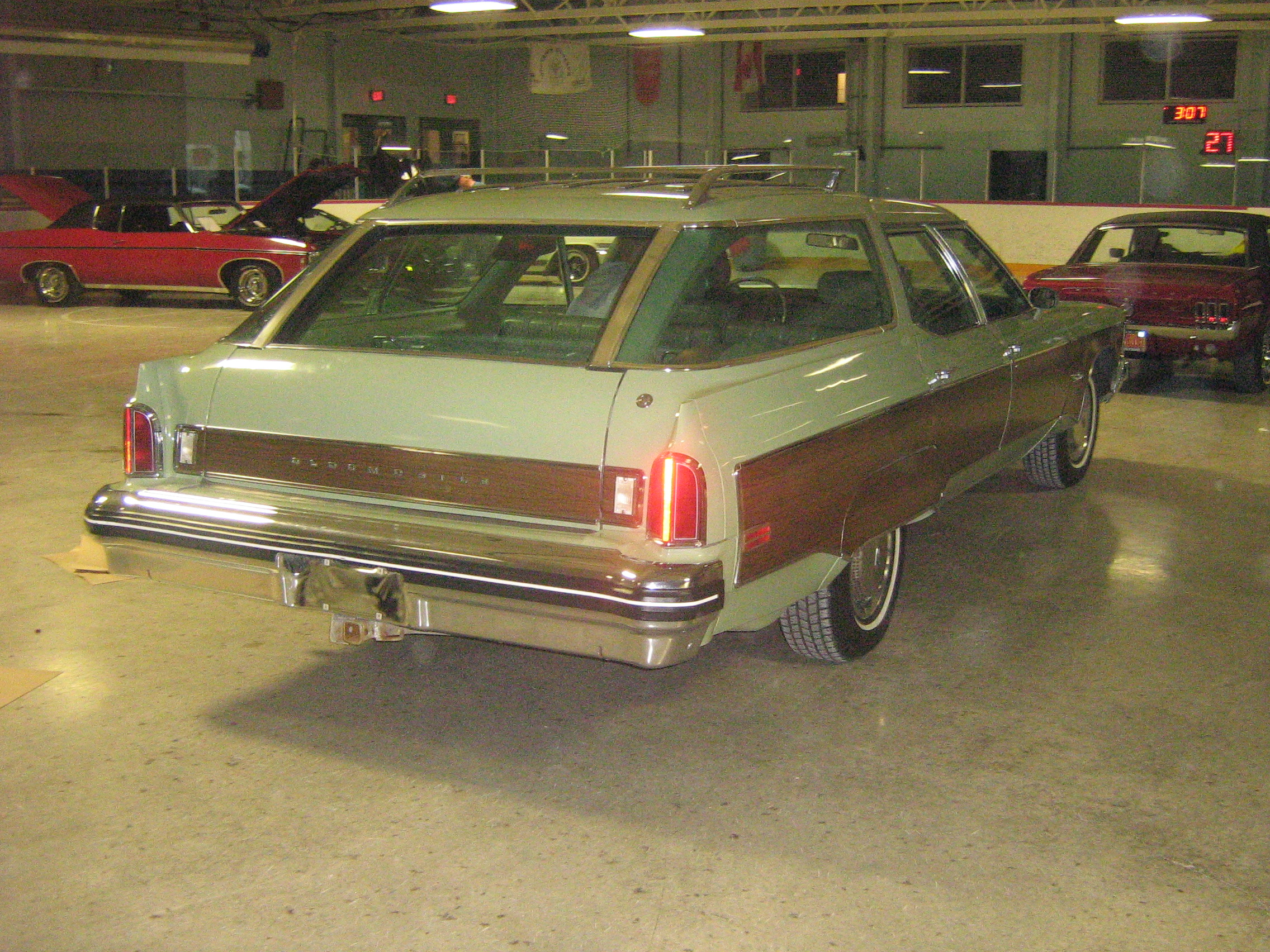
1975 Oldsmobile Custom Cruiser, clamshell tailgate closed

Along with all other 1971–1976 General Motors full-size station wagons built on the B-platform, first-generation Custom Cruiser wagons feature a "clamshell" tailgate design. A two-piece tailgate configuration, the tailgate slid into a recess under the cargo floor while the rear glass window retracted up into the roof; the design operated either manually or with optional power assist.

The first powered tailgate in automotive history, the powered option ultimately became standard, as the manual tailgate required a degree of effort to lift out of storage. The system was operated from either an instrument panel switch or by key on the rear quarter panel. The clamshell tailgate was intended to aid the loading of the 19-foot long station wagons in tight parking spaces. Heavy and complex, the system was not included in the 1977 redesign of the model line. Over one foot shorter and over 1,000 pounds lighter overall, the new body was designed with a two-way tailgate (a design first developed by Ford).

=== Production Figures ===
Note: 1971–1976 model years are the only production figures that Oldsmobile broke down specifically by body configuration (i.e., woodgrain, two-row or three-row seating)

Year	Total	Notes	Grand Total
1971	13,981	Two-row: 4,049 Three-row: 9,932	13,981
1972	24,994	Two-row: 6,907 Three-row: 18,087	24,994
1973	38,921	Two-row, painted: 5,275 Two-row, woodgrain: 7,142 Three-row, painted: 7, 341 Three-row, woodgrain: 19,163	38,921
1974	15,916	Two-row, painted: 1,481 Two-row, woodgrain: 2,960 Three-row, painted: 2,528 Three-row, woodgrain: 8,947	15,916
1975	16,068	Two-row, painted: 1,458 Two-row, woodgrain: 2,837 Three-row, painted: 2,315 Three-row, woodgrain: 9,458	16,068
1976	22,316	Two-row, painted: 2,572 Two-row, woodgrain: 3,849 Three-row, painted: 3,626 Three-row, woodgrain: 12,269	22,316

== Second generation (1977–1990) ==
Second generation
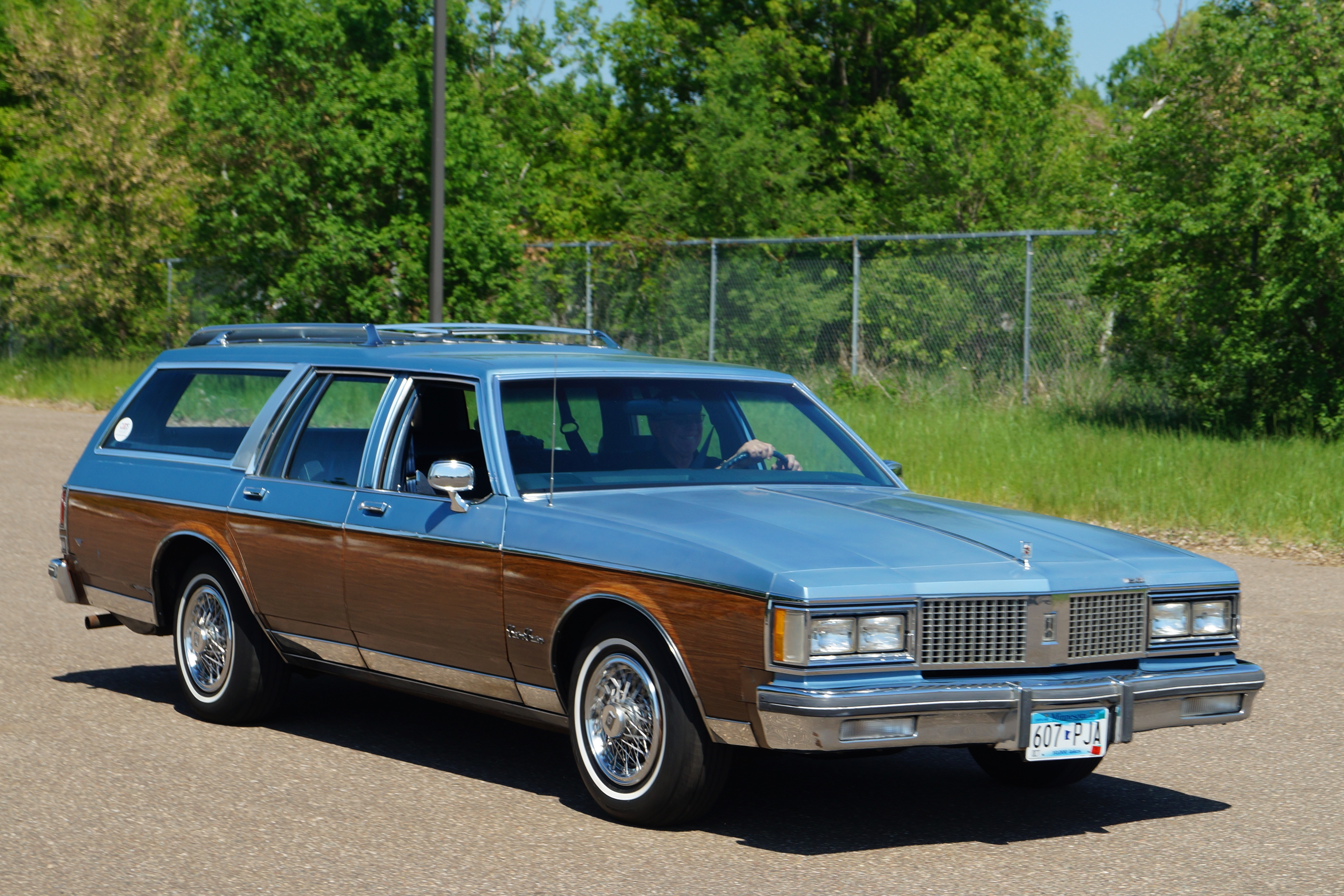

Overview
- Model years: 1977–1990
- Assembly: Kansas City, Kansas (Fairfax Assembly; 1977–1984); South Gate, California (South Gate Assembly; 1978); Detroit, Michigan (Detroit Assembly; 1985–1987); Arlington, Texas (Arlington Assembly; 1988–1990)

Body and chassis
- Platform: B-body
- Related: Buick (Electra, LeSabre) Estate; Pontiac (Catalina, Bonneville, Parisienne, Safari); Chevrolet Caprice/Chevrolet Impala

Powertrain
- Engine: 5.7 L (350 cu in) Oldsmobile V8; 6.6 L (403 cu in) Oldsmobile V8; 5.7 L (350 cu in) LF9 diesel V8; 5.0 L (307 cu in) Oldsmobile V8
- Transmission: 3-speed THM200 automatic 4-speed THM200-4R automatic

Dimensions
- Wheelbase: 115.9 in (2,944 mm)
- Length: 220.3 in (5,596 mm)
- Width: 79.8 in (2,027 mm)
- Height: 58.5 in (1,486 mm)

For the 1977 model year, the second-generation Custom Cruiser was released as part of the downsizing of the entire GM full-size range. In another revision, the Custom Cruiser became a direct counterpart of the Delta 88 sedan. Again the counterpart of the Buick Estate and Pontiac Safari, the Custom Cruiser now shared its body with Chevrolet station wagons.

Following the exit of Chrysler from the segment after 1977, the Custom Cruiser competed primarily against the Ford LTD Country Squire and Mercury Colony Park, which remained in production through 1991. After the 1985 model year, the Custom Cruiser became the largest Oldsmobile, as GM shifted Buick, Oldsmobile, and Pontiac B-body sedans to the front-wheel drive H-platform, downsizing them again. Along with the Chevrolet Caprice remaining the sole B-body sedan/wagon, Oldsmobile and Buick station wagons became distinct model lines (the Pontiac Safari ended production after 1989).

=== Chassis ===
The second-generation Oldsmobile Custom Cruiser (as with all full-size GM station wagons) is based on the GM B-platform. As part of the GM downsizing, station wagons were consolidated upon a common 115.9 inch wheelbase shared with wagons of all three mid-price divisions and Chevrolet (and all B-platform sedans). In the redesign, the Custom Cruiser shed 14 inches in length, 11 inches of wheelbase, and up to 900 pounds of curb weight (though becoming taller). Though sharing its wheelbase with the intermediate Vista Cruiser (and nearly 200 pounds lighter) prior to its 1978 replacement, the Custom Cruiser remained in the full-size segment, as its body was several inches wider and taller.

==== Powertrain ====
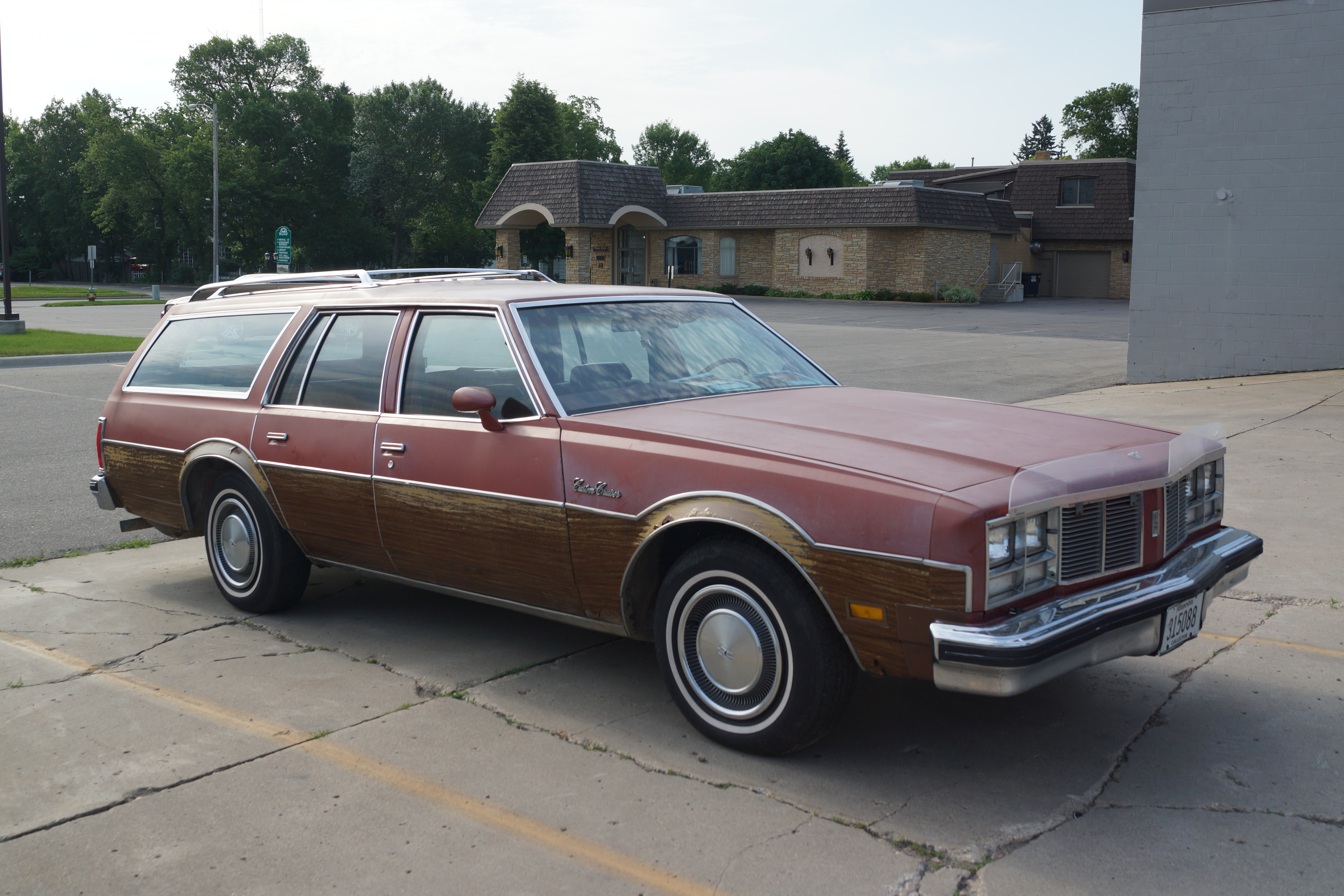
1977 Oldsmobile Custom Cruiser

At its 1977 launch, the second-generation Custom Cruiser was offered with two engines, a 170 hp 350 cubic-inch Oldsmobile V8, with a 185 hp 403 cubic-inch Oldsmobile V8 as an option. For 1979, both engines were detuned: the 350 was detuned to 160 hp and the 403 offered 175 hp. After 1980, both the 350 and the 403 were replaced by the 307.

For 1980, Oldsmobile introduced its third (and last) V8 engine for the B-platform, the 307. Initially producing 150 hp, the 307 was detuned to 140 hp for 1981. For 1985, new "swirl port" cylinder heads were given to the 307. While engine horsepower was not increased, the design increased torque and driveability; at the expense of high RPM power and performance, the heads featured relatively small intake ports. Along with the new cylinder heads, roller lifters replaced flat lifters.

For 1980 in California-market examples, Oldsmobile introduced a new E4ME electronic carburetor, using CCC (Computer Command Control); in 1981, the 4-barrel carburetor was adopted in all 50 states, replacing the previous mechanical M4ME version. In Canada, E4ME was not adopted until 1986.

1977–1990 Custom Cruisers were fitted with two different automatic transmissions. From 1977 until 1980, the 3-speed THM200 was the sole transmission. From 1981 through 1990, the THM200-4R 4-speed automatic with overdrive was added, as GM added a lock-up torque converter and a 0.67:1 overdrive ratio. With the overdrive transmission, the Custom Cruiser drive with a numerically higher rear axle ratio for better performance, while offering improved fuel economy with the overdrive range

In its final year of production, the second-generation Custom Cruiser marked the end of the Oldsmobile-produced V8 (formerly the "Rocket V8"). Shifting from its long-running practice of each division developing its own engines, during the 1980s, GM consolidated V8 production in non-Cadillac full-size cars towards Chevrolet and Oldsmobile, with the latter division developing diesel engines. Towards the end of the decade, GM phased out the Oldsmobile V8 family, as the 307 was the final engine produced by the company without fuel injection. After 1990, Oldsmobile would not have a division-produced engine; the only GM division-unique engine family developed since 1990 was the Cadillac Northstar (developed with some Oldsmobile and Pontiac applications).

1977–1990 Oldsmobile Custom Cruiser powertrain details
Engine	Configuration	Year(s) produced	Output (SAE net)		Induction	Transmission
Engine	Configuration	Year(s) produced	Power	Torque	Induction	Transmission
Oldsmobile V8	5.7 L (350 cu in) OHV 16V V8	1977–1978	170 hp (127 kW)	275 lb⋅ft (373 N⋅m)	4bbl carburetor	THM200 3-speed automatic
Oldsmobile V8	6.6 L (403 cu in) OHV 16V V8	1977–1978	185 hp (138 kW)	320 lb⋅ft (434 N⋅m)	4bbl carburetor	THM200 3-speed automatic
Oldsmobile Diesel V8 (LF9)	5.7 L (350 cu in) OHV 16V V8 diesel	1978–1979	120 hp (89 kW)	220 lb⋅ft (298 N⋅m)	Indirect injection (diesel)	THM200 3-speed automatic
Oldsmobile V8 (350)	5.7 L (350 cu in) OHV 16V V8	1979–1980	160 hp (119 kW)	270 lb⋅ft (366 N⋅m)	4bbl carburetor	THM200 3-speed automatic
Oldsmobile V8 (403)	6.6 L (403 cu in) OHV 16V V8	1979	175 hp (130 kW)	310 lb⋅ft (420 N⋅m)	4bbl carburetor	THM200 3-speed automatic
Oldsmobile V8 (307)	5.0 L (307 cu in) OHV 16V V8	1980	150 hp (112 kW)	245 lb⋅ft (332 N⋅m)	4bbl carburetor	THM200 3-speed automatic
Oldsmobile LF9 V8	5.7 L (350 cu in) OHV 16V V8 diesel	1980–1985	105 hp (78 kW)	205 lb⋅ft (278 N⋅m)	Indirect injection (diesel)	1980: THM200 3-speed automatic 1981–1985: THM200-4R 4-speed automatic
Oldsmobile V8 (307)	5.0 L (307 cu in) OHV 16V V8	1981–1984	140 hp (104 kW)	240 lb⋅ft (325 N⋅m)	4bbl carburetor	THM200-4R 4-speed automatic
Oldsmobile V8 (307)	5.0 L (307 cu in) OHV 16V V8	1985–1990	140 hp (104 kW)	255 lb⋅ft (346 N⋅m)	4bbl carburetor	THM200-4R 4-speed automatic

===== Oldsmobile diesel V8 =====
For 1978, Oldsmobile introduced its first diesel engine, a naturally aspirated 120 hp 350 cubic-inch V8. For 1980, the V8 was retuned to 105 hp, remaining an option through 1985.

=== Body ===
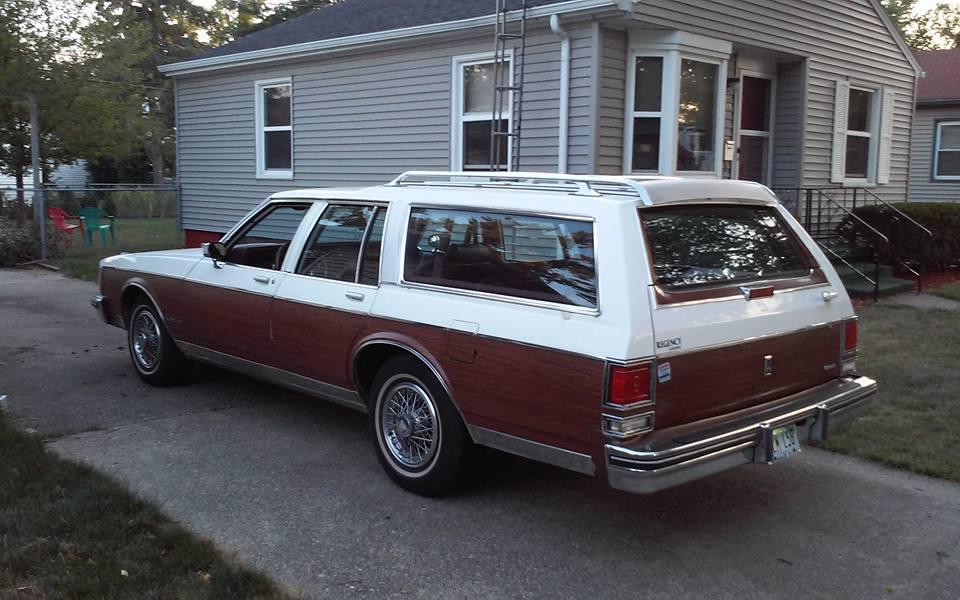
1990 Oldsmobile Custom Cruiser, rear

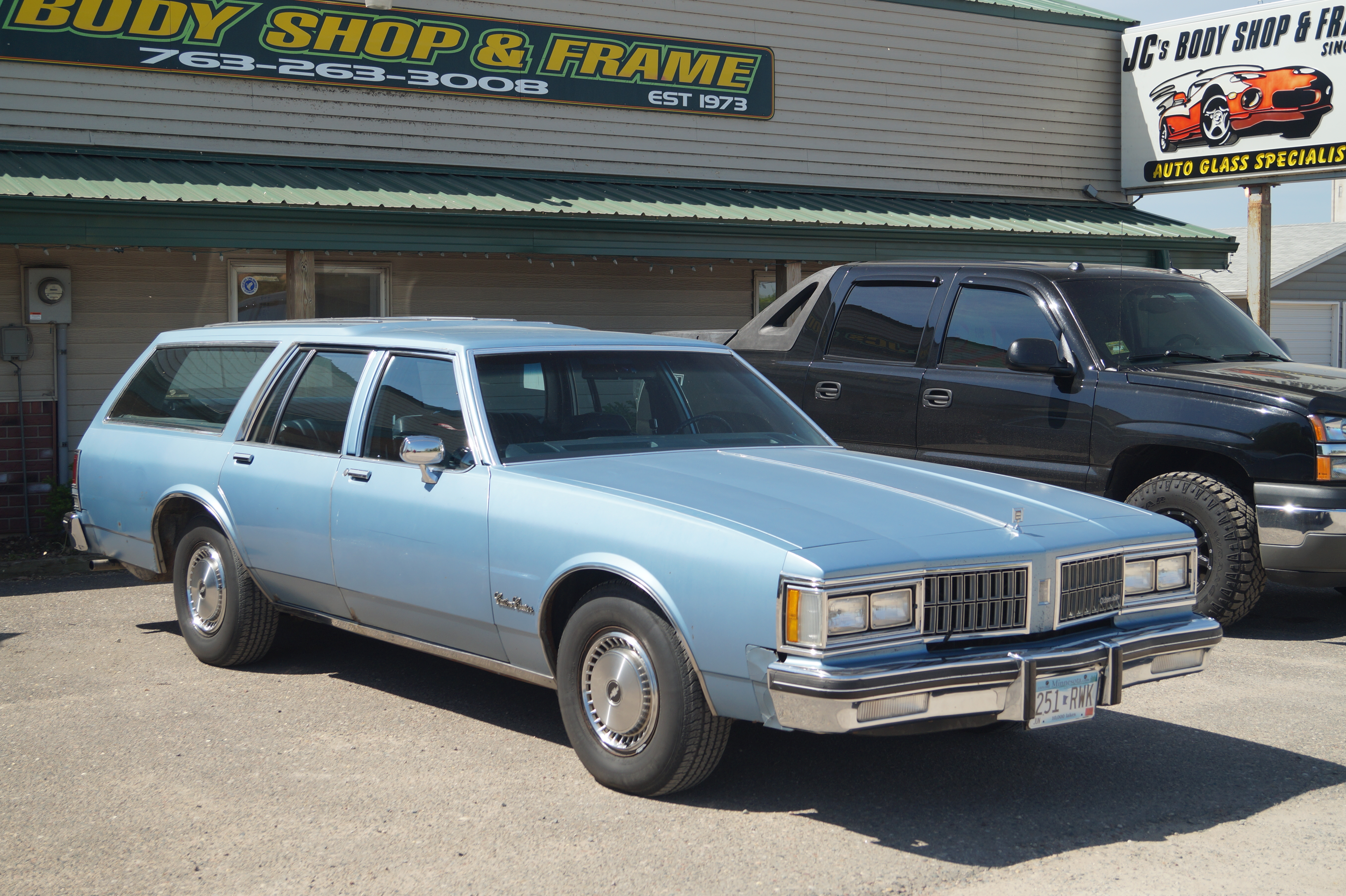
Oldsmobile Custom Cruiser configured without wood trim

In contrast to the 1971–1976 Custom Cruiser (a hybrid of the Delta 88 and the Ninety-Eight), Oldsmobile styled the 1977 Custom Cruiser as a station wagon version of the Delta 88, adopting its front fascia entirely. To distinguish itself from its nearly identical Buick, Chevrolet, and Pontiac counterparts, the Custom Cruiser was given its simulated wood design, with wood following the curve of the wheel wells.

Though interior space was reduced only marginally through the downsizing, the full-size Custom Cruiser and the intermediate Vista Cruiser/Cutlass Supreme wagon switched places as the longest Oldsmobile wagon; this lasted only for 1977, as GM intermediates underwent their own downsizing for 1978.

In a major departure from the 2-piece "clamshell" tailgate of its predecessor, the Custom Cruiser was fitted with a two-way tailgate; similar to configurations offered by Ford and Chrysler, the two-way tailgate opened to the side as a door or hinged down as a tailgate (with the rear window glass retracted). The third-row seat made its return, allowing for 8-passenger seating; to allow for production commonality on a single wheelbase, the Custom Cruiser was produced with a rear-facing third row seat (as were all full-size GM station wagons).

Alongside all B-platform station wagons and sedans, the Custom Cruiser saw an exterior update for 1980, with wagons receiving a new front fascia. To aid aerodynamics and fuel economy the grille and front fascia were redesigned, with the headlamps mounted closer to the front bumpers. Similar to the other B-body Oldsmobile's, the Custom Cruiser gained wraparound front marker lights. In a minor change, the design of the simulated woodgrain adopted the common layout used by Buick and Chevrolet, joining the headlamps and taillamps.

From 1980 until 1990, the exterior and interior of the Oldsmobile Custom Cruiser saw almost no visible change, besides a small front fascia swap in 1985. Instead of the split-grille style from 1980 to 1984, the Custom Cruiser was now fitted with a single, wider grille. Along with the wider grille came a sharper header panel, instead of curving off on the edge. In 1986, the rear tailgate saw the addition of a federally mandated third brake light. In 1989, the seat belts in the B-body lineup were modified to meet federal safety standards. The rear outboard seats were fitted with shoulder belts and as the platform was not designed for airbags, the front shoulder belts were shifted from the B-pillar to the front doors for 1990, allowing the seat belts to remain buckled at all times.

=== Production figures ===
Year	Total
1977	32,827
1978	34,491
1979	36,648
1980	17,067
1981	18,956
1982	19,367
1983	25,243
1984	34,061
1985	22,889
1986	21,073
1987	17,742
1988	11,114
1989	8,929
1990	3,890

== Third generation (1991–1992) ==
Third generation
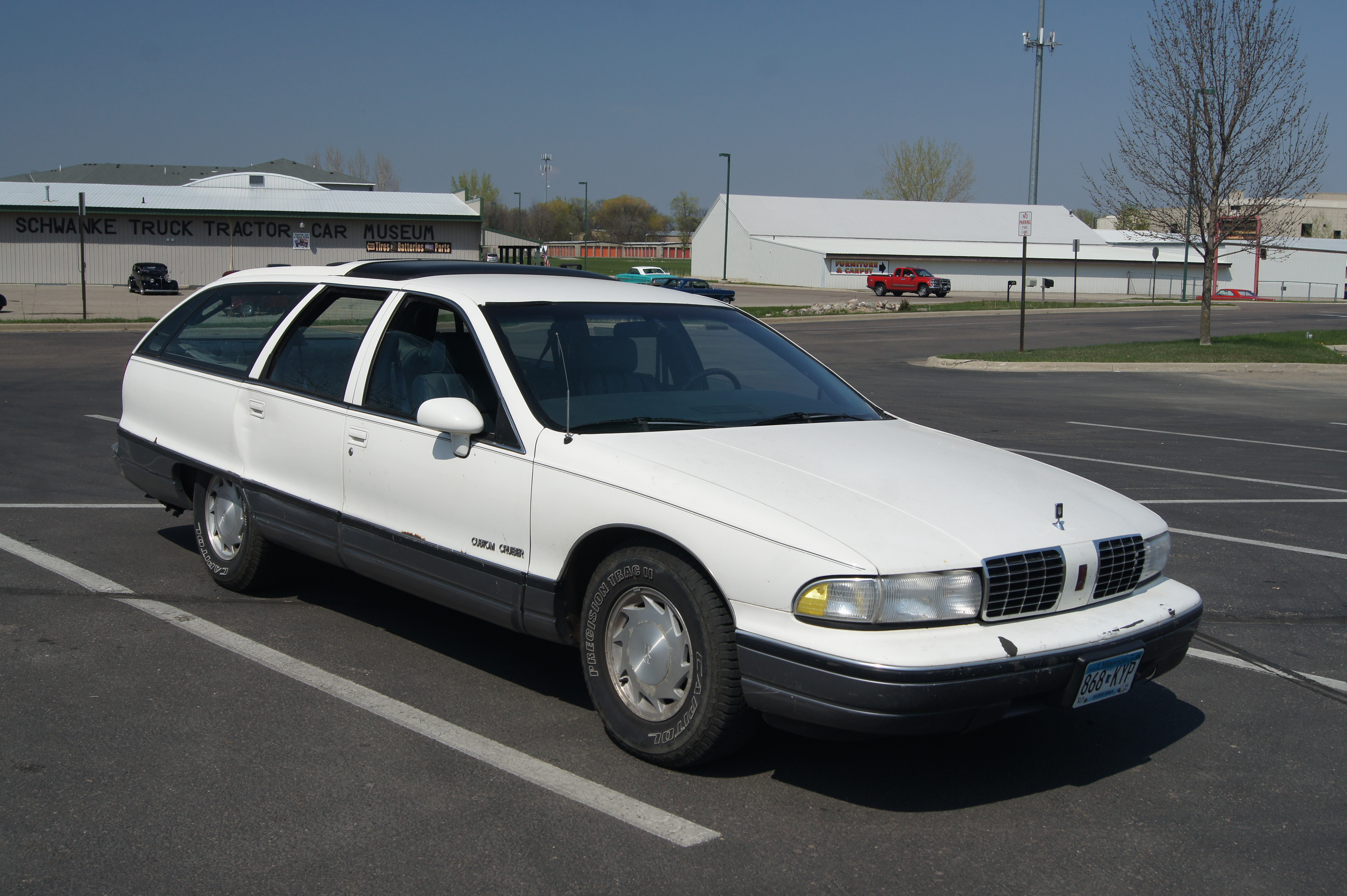
- 1992 Oldsmobile Custom Cruiser

Overview
- Model years: 1991–1992
- Assembly: United States: Ypsilanti, Michigan (Willow Run Assembly)

Body and chassis
- Class: Station wagon (full-size)
- Body style: 5-door station wagon
- Platform: B-body
- Related: Buick Roadmaster Estate; Chevrolet Caprice Estate

Powertrain
- Engine: 5.0 L (305 cu in) L03 V8; 5.7 L (350 cu in) L05 V8
- Transmission: 4-speed 4L60 automatic

Dimensions
- Wheelbase: 115.9 in (2,944 mm)
- Length: 217.5 in (5,524 mm)
- Width: 79.7 in (2,024 mm)
- Height: 60.3 in (1,532 mm)

For 1991, General Motors redesigned its full-size B-body line for the first time since 1977. Though chassis underpinnings saw only minor updates, substantial updates were made to the body and interior. As part of the redesign, the Custom Cruiser received functional upgrades including anti-lock brakes and a driver-side airbag (replacing the door-mounted passive-restraint seatbelts).

The Custom Cruiser was joined by a redesigned Chevrolet Caprice wagon, with the Buick Estate renamed as the Buick Roadmaster (Pontiac retired the Safari after 1989). In contrast to Chevrolet and Buick, Oldsmobile was the only GM division to market the full-size B-body exclusively as a station wagon (with the Oldsmobile Ninety-Eight serving as its largest sedan). For 1992, sales of the model line declined over 40 percent, leading the division to discontinue the model line for 1993 in favor of concentrating resources towards the Bravada SUV and Silhouette minivan.

On June 5, 1992, Oldsmobile produced the final Custom Cruiser station wagon; it would be the final Oldsmobile-brand vehicle produced with a V8 engine and rear-wheel drive. The Custom Cruiser was also the final Oldsmobile produced exclusively with a 3-passenger front bench seat; with the sole exception of the Cutlass Ciera/Cutlass Cruiser, all subsequent vehicles produced by the division were offered with 2-passenger front seating as standard or as an option.

=== Chassis ===
The 1991 and 1992 Oldsmobile Custom Cruiser is based upon the GM B platform, carrying over the 116-inch wheelbase from the previous generation. Primarily through the addition of safety equipment upgrades, the redesign of the Custom Cruiser added nearly 100 pounds of weight to the vehicle (though nearly 650 pounds lighter than a 1976 counterpart).

Following the 1992 discontinuation of the Custom Cruiser, the Buick Roadmaster Estate and Chevrolet Caprice Estate were produced with no major changes (to the B-body platform) through their 1996 discontinuation, outside of the 1994 replacement of the L05 V8 with the LT1 V8 for 1994.

==== Powertrain ====
In a central part of the 1991 redesign of the B platform, General Motors retired its practice of divisionally-developed engines in favor of standardizing the Chevrolet small-block V8 across all GM rear-wheel drive cars and trucks. The Oldsmobile 307 from the previous generation was replaced by a 5.0L (305 cubic inch) unit rated at 170 hp (a 30 hp increase over the 307); in a first for a rear-wheel drive Oldsmobile, the V8 was fuel-injected. For 1992, a 180 hp 5.7 L V8 was introduced as an option.

Both engines were paired with the Hydramatic 4L60 4-speed overdrive automatic (replacing the THM200-4R).

1991–1992 Oldsmobile Custom Cruiser powertrain details
Engine name	Configuration	Year(s) produced	Output		Induction	Transmission
Engine name	Configuration	Year(s) produced	Power	Torque	Induction	Transmission
Chevrolet L03 V8	5.0 L (305 cu in) OHV 16V V8	1991–1992	170 hp (127 kW)	255 lb⋅ft (346 N⋅m)	Throttle-body fuel injection (TBI)	4L60 4-speed automatic
Chevrolet L05 V8	5.7 L (350 cu in) OHV 16V V8	1992	180 hp (134 kW)	300 lb⋅ft (410 N⋅m)	Throttle-body fuel injection (TBI)	4L60 4-speed automatic

=== Body ===
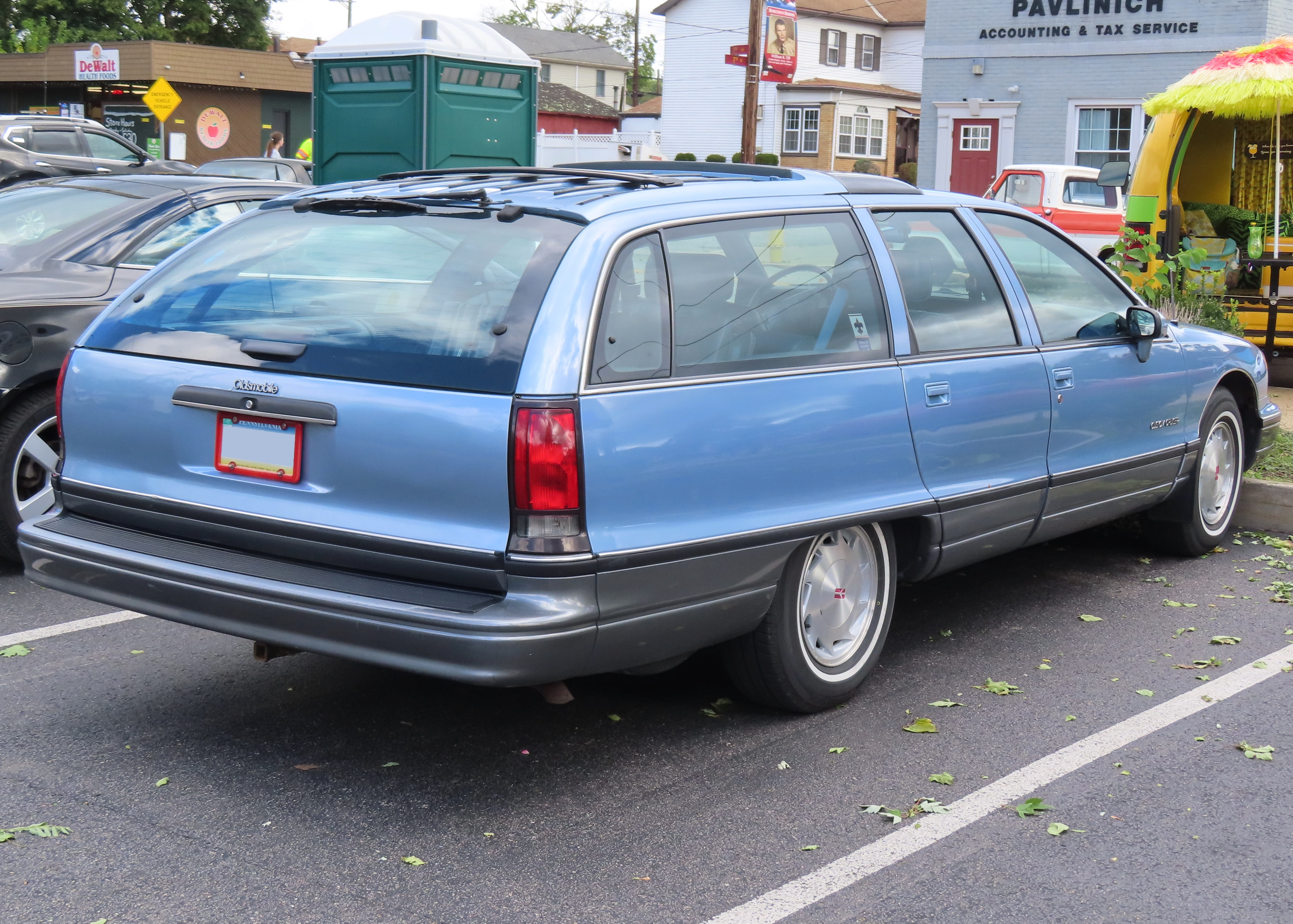
Rear view 1992 Oldsmobile Custom Cruiser

As with the previous generation, the Custom Cruiser shared nearly its entire body with its Chevrolet and Buick counterparts, sharing design features from both model lines. The body-color split grille was derived nearly entirely from the Chevrolet Caprice, with a fixed second-row skylight shared with the Roadmaster Estate. Though actually 2.8 inches shorter (and 1.8 inches taller) than the previous generation, the low-skirted rear fender wells made the car appear much lower and longer than it was.

In a major break from both its predecessor and the Caprice/Roadmaster, exterior woodgrain trim was discontinued, instead styled with two-tone paint as standard; wire-style wheelcovers were replaced by aluminum-alloy wheels. In another major change, the use of chrome trim was extensively reduced, with body-color bumper covers integrated into the body. While its aerodynamically curved rear roofline proved beneficial for fuel economy, the design forced the retirement of the three-way tailgate. In place of a liftgate (similar to the smaller Cutlass Cruiser), the body was configured with a hatch-type rear window (adding a rear windscreen wiper) and a two-way tailgate. As all Custom Cruisers were fitted with three-row seating, the cargo area was fitted with pop-out vent windows to aid airflow and ventilation.

Though sharing a nearly identical dashboard design as its divisional counterparts (differing primarily in trim), the Custom Cruiser was fitted with its own seat and wood trim design. In contrast to its predecessor, the instrument panel was fitted with a full set of analog gauges (matching the Cutlass Supreme, Touring Sedan, and Troféo). Cloth-trim seats were standard, with leather-trim seats offered as an option. In line with smaller station wagons, a privacy cover was offered as option for the cargo area.

=== Production figures ===
Year	Total
1991	7,663
1992	4,347
