= Pontiac Grand Safari =

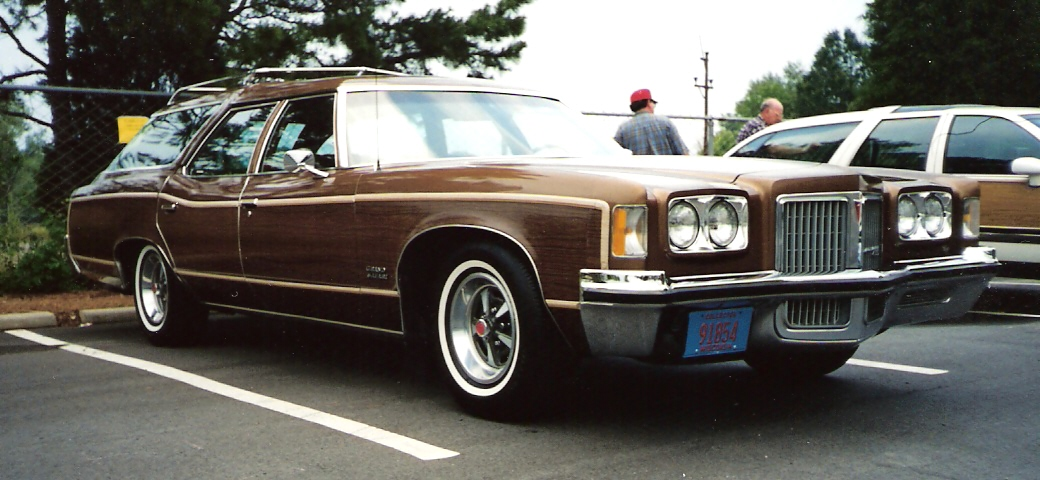
- 1972 Pontiac Grand Safari

Overview
- Manufacturer: Pontiac (General Motors)
- Production: 1971–1978
- Assembly: Pontiac Assembly, Pontiac, Michigan, United States

Body and chassis
- Class: Full-size car
- Body style: 4-door station wagon
- Layout: Front-engine, rear-wheel-drive
- Related: Buick Estate; Oldsmobile Custom Cruiser

Chronology
- Predecessor: Pontiac Bonneville Safari (1965)
- Successor: Pontiac Bonneville Safari (1979)

The Pontiac Grand Safari was Pontiac's top-of-the-line full-size station wagon offered from 1971 to 1978. The Grand Safari used the grille and interior trim of the Bonneville and Grand Ville passenger car series, and most (but not all) examples were trimmed with woodgrain paneling on the sides and tailgate.

== First generation (1971–1976) ==
First generation
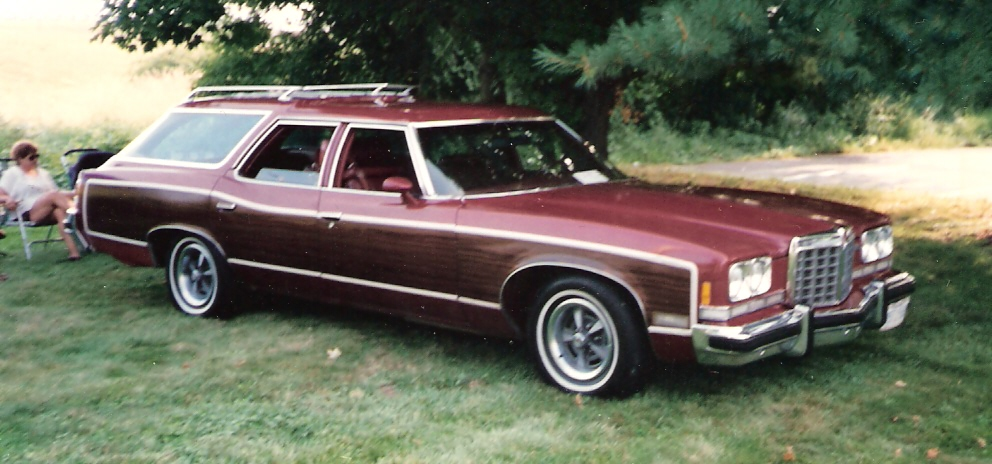
- 1974 Pontiac Grand Safari

Overview
- Model years: 1971–1976
- Designer: Bill Mitchell

Body and chassis
- Platform: C-body (Note: All 1971-76 GM wagons were B-body-based. Interior trim included hard plastic lower door like other B-bodies, not padded vinyl as used on C-bodies. 1973 model designation was 2BP.)
- Related: Buick Electra; Buick Estate; Chevrolet Kingswood; Chevrolet Townsman; Oldsmobile Custom Cruiser; Oldsmobile 98

Powertrain
- Engine: 400 cu in (6.6 L) V8; 455 cu in (7.5 L) V8
- Transmission: 3-speed TH-400 automatic

Dimensions
- Wheelbase: 127.0 in (3,226 mm)
- Length: 1971: 230.2 in (5,847 mm); 1972: 228.0 in (5,791 mm); 1973: 228.8 in (5,812 mm); 1974–76: 231.3 in (5,875 mm)
- Width: 1971–1973: 79.5 in (2,019 mm); 1974–1975: 79.6 in (2,022 mm); 1976: 79.4 in (2,017 mm)
- Height: 57.8 in (1,468 mm)
- Curb weight: 5,000–5,300 lb (2,300–2,400 kg)

For 1971, the Pontiac Grand Safari was introduced as the top-trim Pontiac station wagon, sharing trim with the newly introduced Grand Ville sedan. Slotted above the Bonneville Safari, the Grand Safari was a counterpart to the Buick Estate and the Oldsmobile Custom Cruiser. Though officially designated as B-body cars by GM (in line with the Chevrolet Impala/Caprice station wagons), the Grand Safari and its Buick/Oldsmobile counterparts shared a 127-inch wheelbase with "senior" C-body sedans. In contrast to other B-body sedans, B-body station wagons were fitted with multi-leaf rear springs (instead of coil springs).

The 1974-1976 Grand Safari (and Catalina Safari) station wagons are the largest Pontiac vehicles ever built, with a 127-inch wheelbase and 231.3-inch overall length. At a curb weight of approximately 5300 pounds, a three-row version is also the heaviest vehicle ever produced by the brand.

A 400 cubic-inch V8 was the standard engine on the Grand Safari for 1973 and 1975. A 455 cubic-inch V8 was offered as an option those two years and was standard for the other four years of this generation.

=== Clamshell tailgate ===
The Grand Safari wagons featured a two-piece 'Clamshell' tailgate design, marketed as the Glide-away Tailgate. In an industry first, the rear power-operated glass slid up into the roof as the tailgate (manually or with power assist) slid into a recess under the cargo floor. The power system was operated by switches on the instrument panel or a key switch on the rear quarter panel. While heavy and complex, the system was intended to reduce the space needed to load or unload the 19-foot long wagons in tight spaces.

The clamshell design was not adopted by other automakers, and GM replaced the design with a 3-way tailgate for its 1977 B-body redesign.

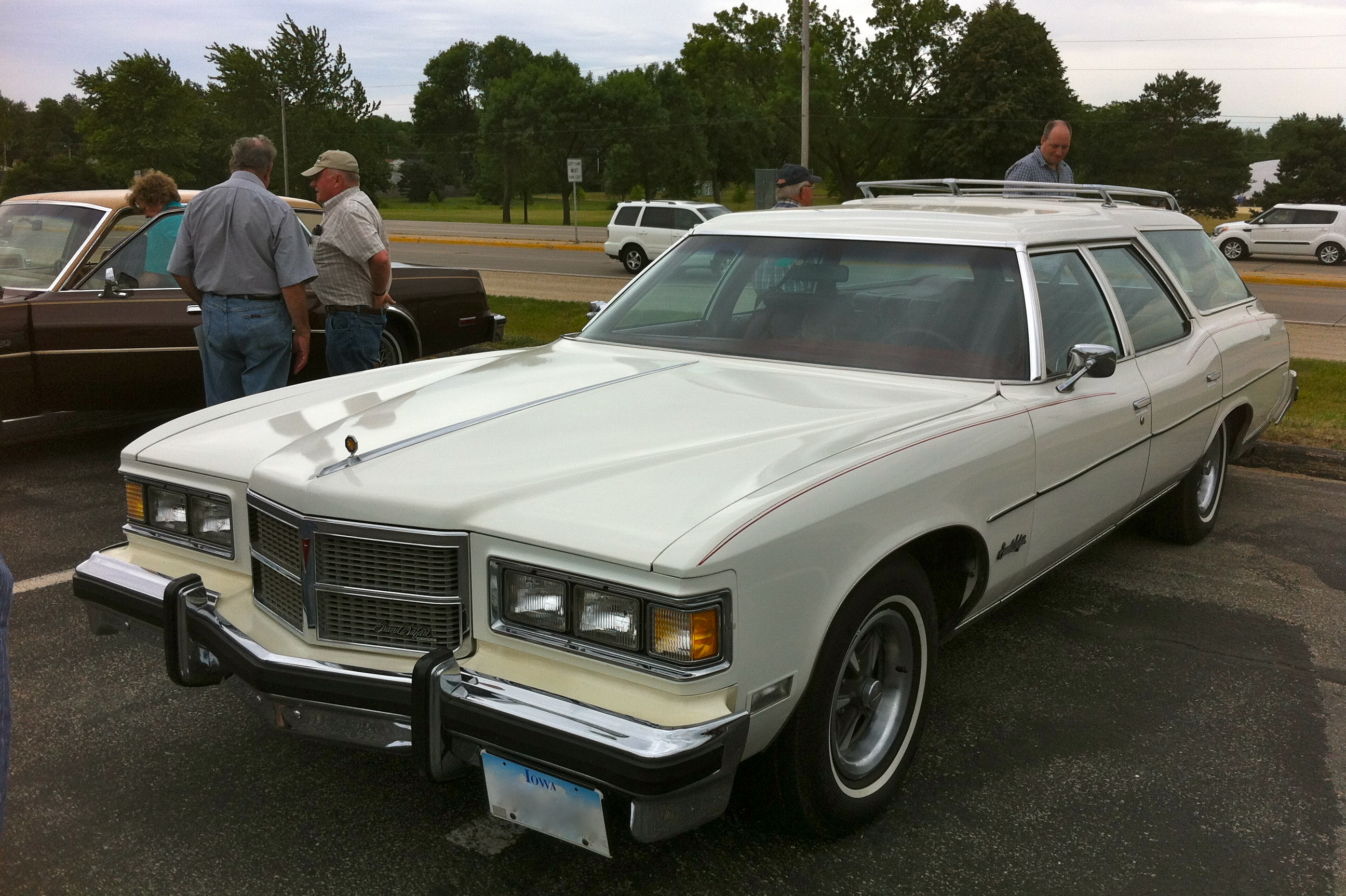
1975 Pontiac Grand Safari

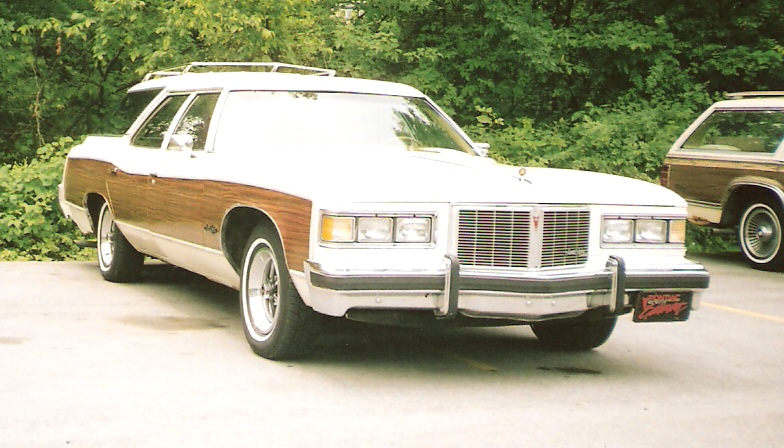
1976 Pontiac Grand Safari

== Second generation (1977–1978) ==
Second generation
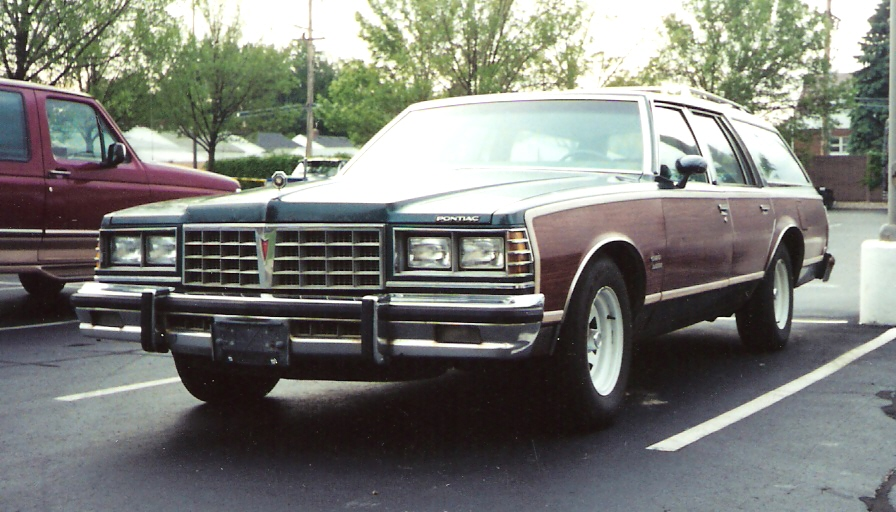
- 1977 Pontiac Grand Safari

Overview
- Model years: 1977–1978

Body and chassis
- Platform: B-body

Dimensions
- Wheelbase: 115.9 in (2,944 mm)

For 1977, the Pontiac Grand Safari was redesigned. Using the newly downsized GM B-body chassis, the model line became the station wagon counterpart of the Pontiac Bonneville sedan (the Grand Ville was discontinued). The Pontiac counterpart of the Buick Estate and Oldsmobile Custom Cruiser, the downsizing of the platform reduced the wheelbase from 127 inches to 115.9 inches, shared with both B-body sedans (and Chevrolet Impala/Caprice station wagons), ending its relationship with the C-body chassis.

In a major functional change, the "Glide-Away" tailgate was replaced by a three-way configuration similar to AMC, Chrysler, and Ford. As the curb weight was reduced to just over 4,000 pounds, the Grand Safari adopted a different set of engines, as the 301 cubic-inch V8 became standard, with an Oldsmobile-supplied 403 V8 as an option; for 1978, a Pontiac 350 V8 became an additional option.

For 1979, Pontiac renamed the Grand Safari as the Bonneville Safari; after the Bonneville became the mid-size Pontiac sedan for 1982, the station wagon became the Pontiac Safari through the 1989 model year.
