= Black & Decker DustBuster =

American cordless vacuum cleaner

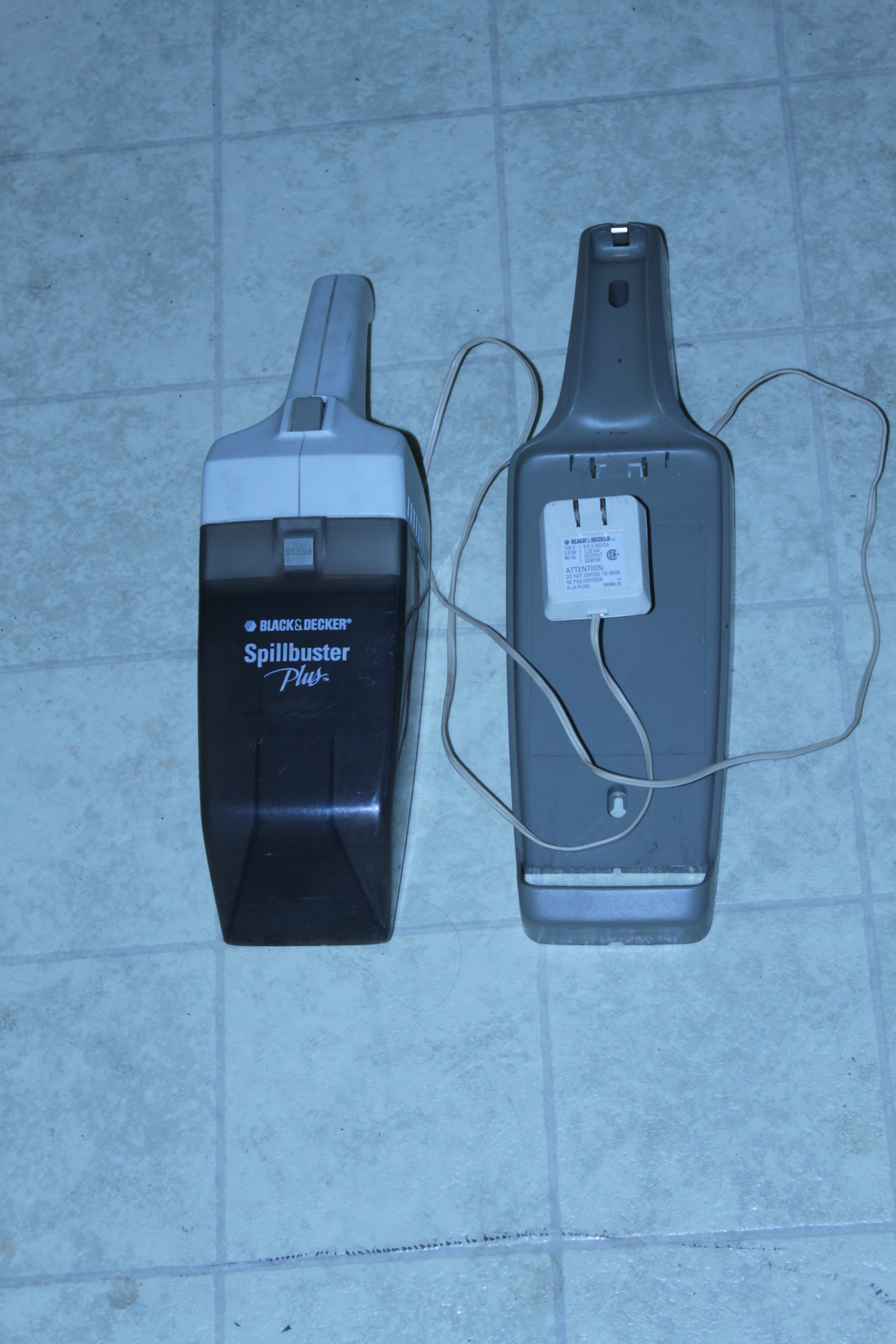
Spillbuster 2000 from 1998

The Black & Decker DustBuster (now stylized as dustbuster) is a cordless vacuum cleaner that was introduced in January 1979.

Mark Proett and Carroll Gantz are listed as the inventors on the utility and design patents, respectively, assigned to Black & Decker for a cordless vacuum cleaner. Mark Proett was an engineer whose utility patent was for B&D's Model 9321 cordless vacuum cleaner, called the Spot Vac, a component of the Mod 4 series of power tools (shrub trimmer, lantern, grass shear, drill, and Spot Vac), all powered by a single, rechargeable, and interchangeable "energy pak" handle with batteries. The device uses suction power to pick up fine dirt and debris including pet hair.

The design originated from the Apollo space mission, where NASA required a portable, self-contained drill capable of extracting core samples from the lunar surface. Black & Decker was tasked with the job, and developed a computer program to optimize the design of the drill's motor and ensure minimal power consumption. That computer program led to the development of a cordless miniature vacuum cleaner.

The Mod 4 series was introduced in 1974 but was generally not successful in the marketplace. However, in post-mortem consumer research, the Spot Vac was highly successful with women, who borrowed it from their husband's workbench in the basement to clean up minor spills in the kitchen and upstairs. This inspired the design of a new household product specifically for use upstairs by women. The product appearance was completely redesigned by Gantz's design patent, the first design patent ever filed by B&D, renamed the Dustbuster and introduced in January 1979 as a household product, not a power tool. Gantz was Manager of the Black & Decker the United States Consumer Power Tool Division's Industrial Design Department at the time. Over a million Dustbusters were sold in its first year, four times that of the traditional handheld vacuum market and its success enabled B&D to establish a new Household Products Division, which in 1983, acquired and merged with General Electric Housewares Operations in Bridgeport, Connecticut. By 1985, B&D had the majority share of cordless vacuum cleaner market and the Dustbuster sold 7 million units annually.

The product has been redesigned several times, and as of 2016 Black and Decker still used the name in its handheld vacuum products. In 1995, the Smithsonian acquired a 1979 Dustbuster and placed it in their electrical collection at the National Museum of American History. By this time, it is estimated that over 100 million "Dustbusters" had been sold. "Dustbuster" has become a genericized trademark for a handheld vacuum cleaner in some parts of the world, due to its success as a design and worldwide recognition. In 2009, the original 1979 Dustbuster was selected and published as a detailed "Catalyst" case study by the Industrial Designers Society of America (IDSA) to illustrate the power of design to achieve commercial success and to effect positive change in the marketplace.
