= Buick Estate =

Automobile

Buick Estate Wagon
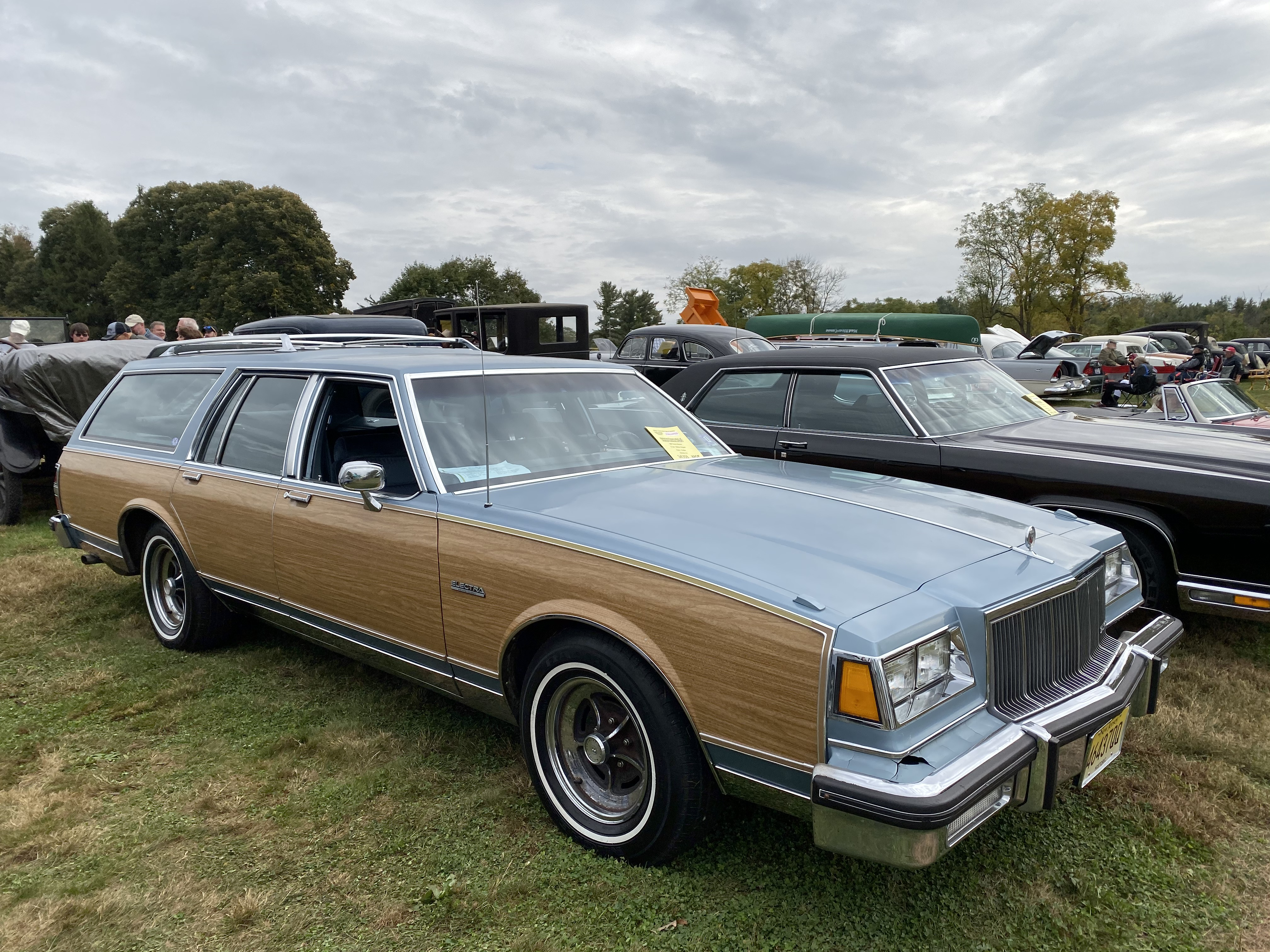
- 1987 Buick Electra Estate

Overview
- Manufacturer: Buick (General Motors)
- Production: 1970–1990

Body and chassis
- Class: Full-size car
- Body style: 4-door station wagon
- Layout: FR layout

Buick Estate is a nameplate that was used by Buick, denoting its full-size station wagon line. "Estate" was what Buick sometimes called the wagon bodystyle from 1940 to 1964; from 1970 to 1990 it was treated as a standalone nameplate (and it continued to be used for the Roadmaster Estate). The Estate nameplate was derived from the term country estate in wealthy suburban areas and estate car, the British term for a station wagon. Serving as the flagship station wagon line of General Motors, the Buick Estate was slotted slightly above its Oldsmobile Custom Cruiser divisional counterpart; both competed against the Chrysler Town & Country and the Mercury Colony Park. Buick's first station wagons were wood-paneled; from 1970 to 1996, nearly all examples were sold with simulated exterior wood paneling (though technically an option).

For much of its model life, the Buick Estate and other wagons were produced using GM B platform as the station wagon counterpart of Buick sedans; the larger GM C platform from 1949–1953, then again from 1971–1976 (the longest and heaviest Buick vehicles ever built). In line with other brands having a wagon-associated moniker, Estate became adopted by other Buick wagons (regardless of size), with the exceptions of the 1964–1972 Buick Sport Wagon and the 1982–1989 Buick Skyhawk station wagon.

The Buick Roadmaster Estate (alongside its Chevrolet Caprice counterpart) was the last full-size station wagon to remain in production and the last to offer exterior woodgrain trim. Following the 1996 model year, Buick retired both the Roadmaster and Century Estate wagons, ending the use of the Estate nameplate. Buick did not market another station wagon in the United States until 2018, when it rebranded the Opel Insignia B Country Tourer as the Buick Regal TourX.

== Early history ==
The first Buick station wagon was the large-bodied GM C platform Buick Super Estate modified with a wooden body, shared with the Oldsmobile Series 60. In 1941 and 1942 it was available on Buick's B platform Special series, and later on Buick's C platform (Roadmaster and Super) in the 1946–53 model years. From 1954 to 1958 it was only offered on the smaller B platform Century and Special, with all steel bodies. Among these were hardtop station wagons called Caballero that were offered only in 1957 and 1958.

From 1959 through 1964 a station wagon was offered on the B platform Invicta and LeSabre. In 1965, it was replaced by the new, smaller A platform Buick Sport Wagon, making the B-body Chevrolet Impala Estate and Pontiac Safari the only full-sized GM station wagons until 1970.

=== 1940s ===
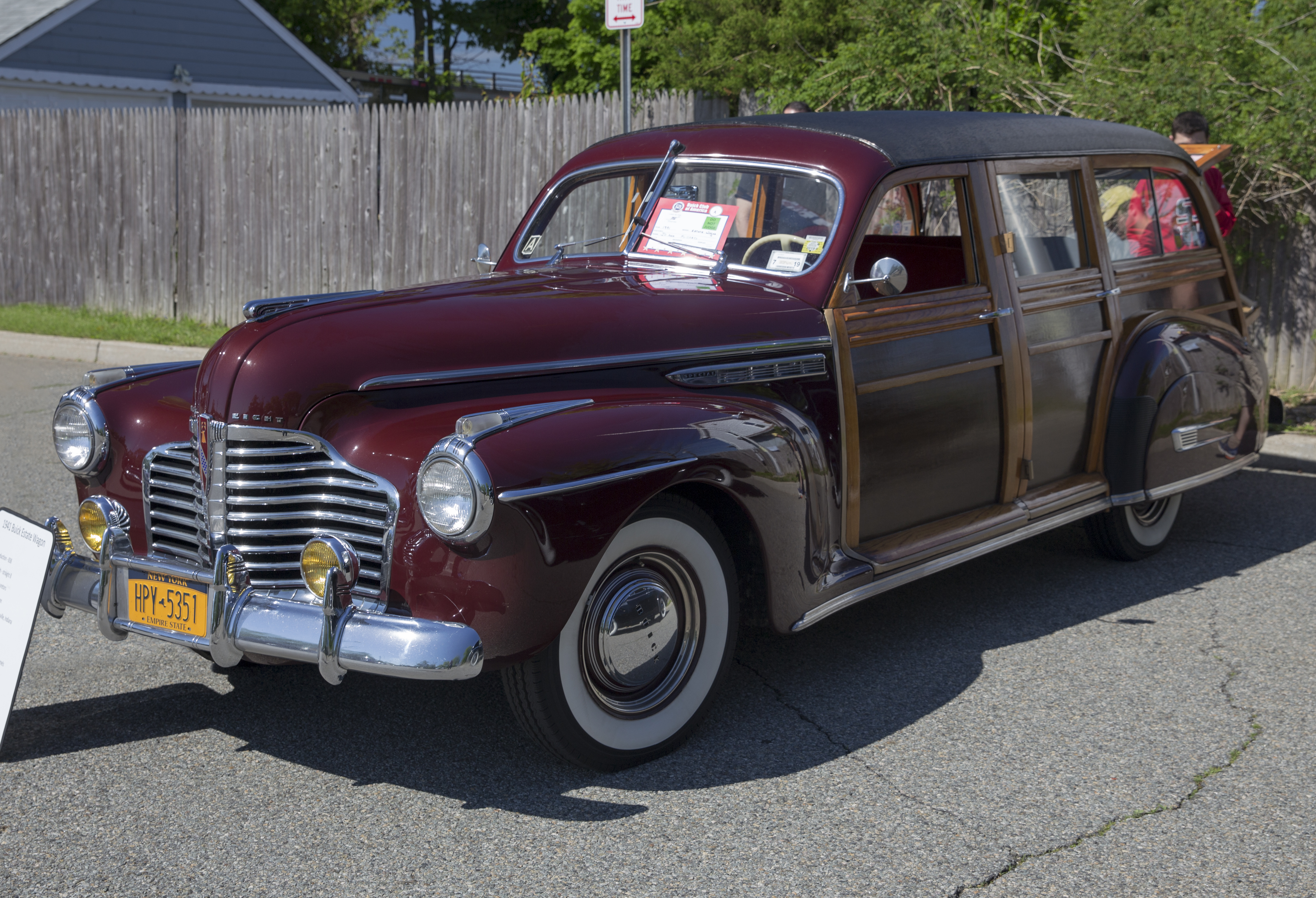
1941 Buick Special Estate (Model 49)

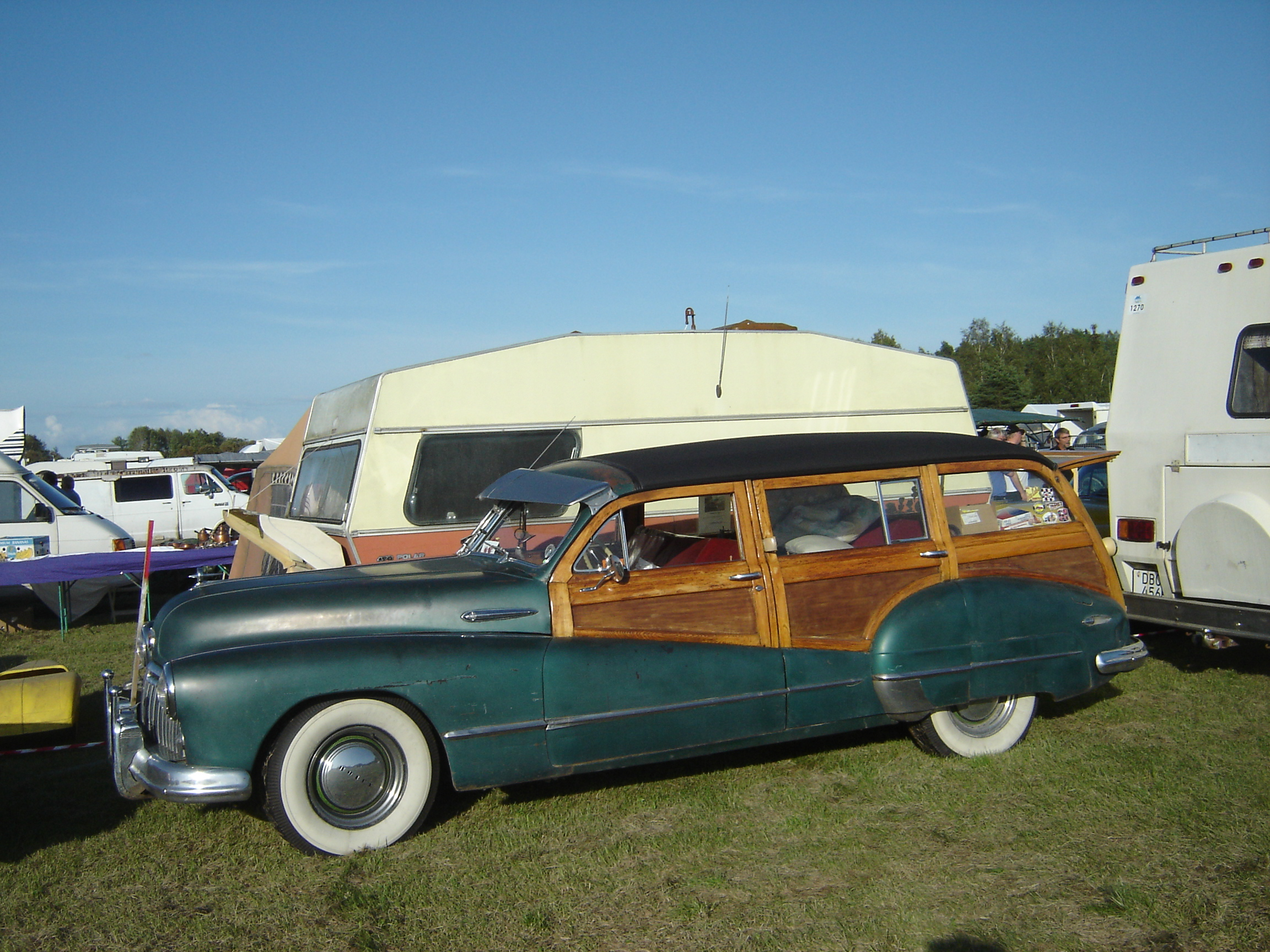
1942 Buick Special Estate (Model 49)

=== 1950s ===
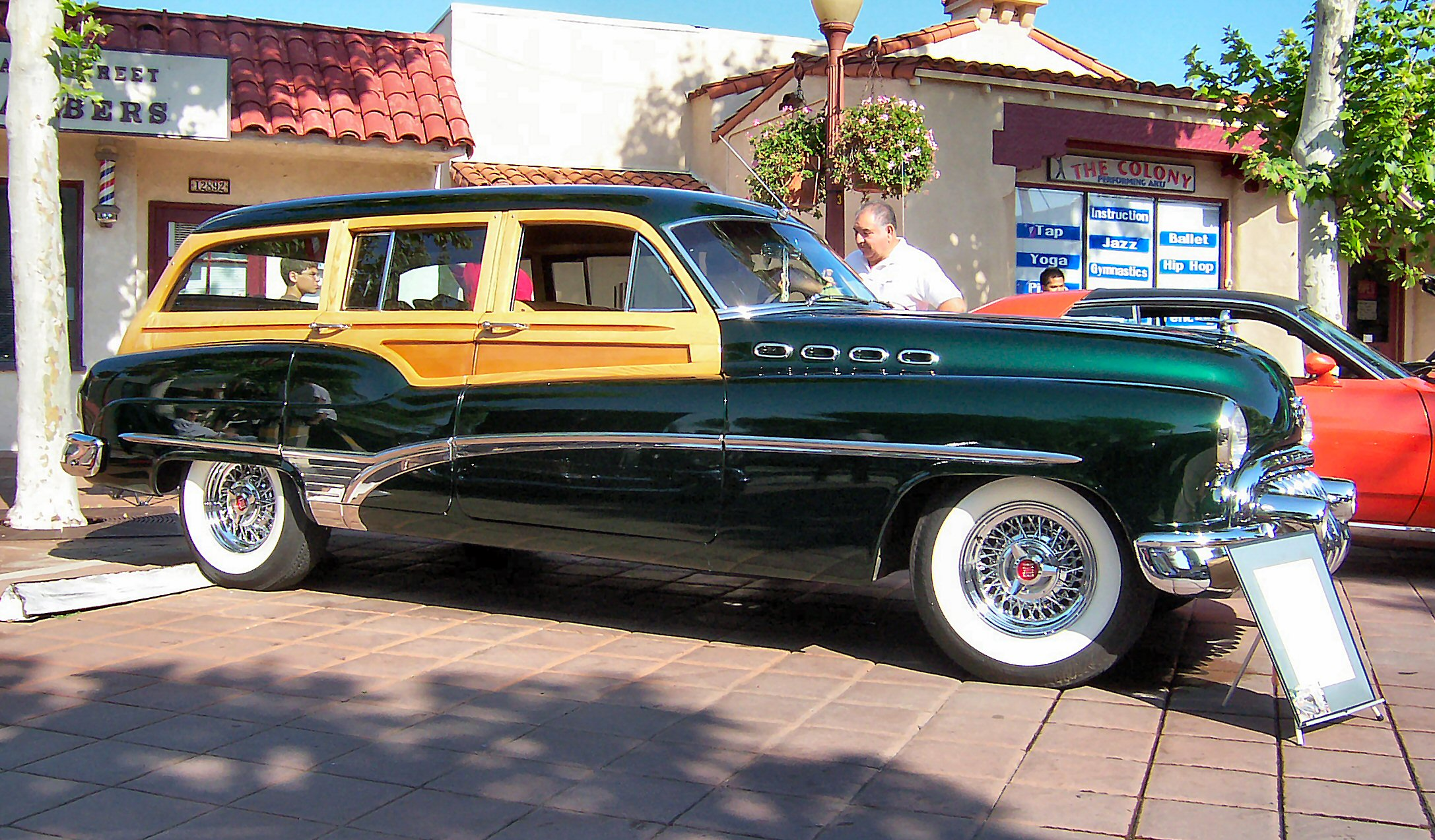
1950 Buick Roadmaster Estate Wagon

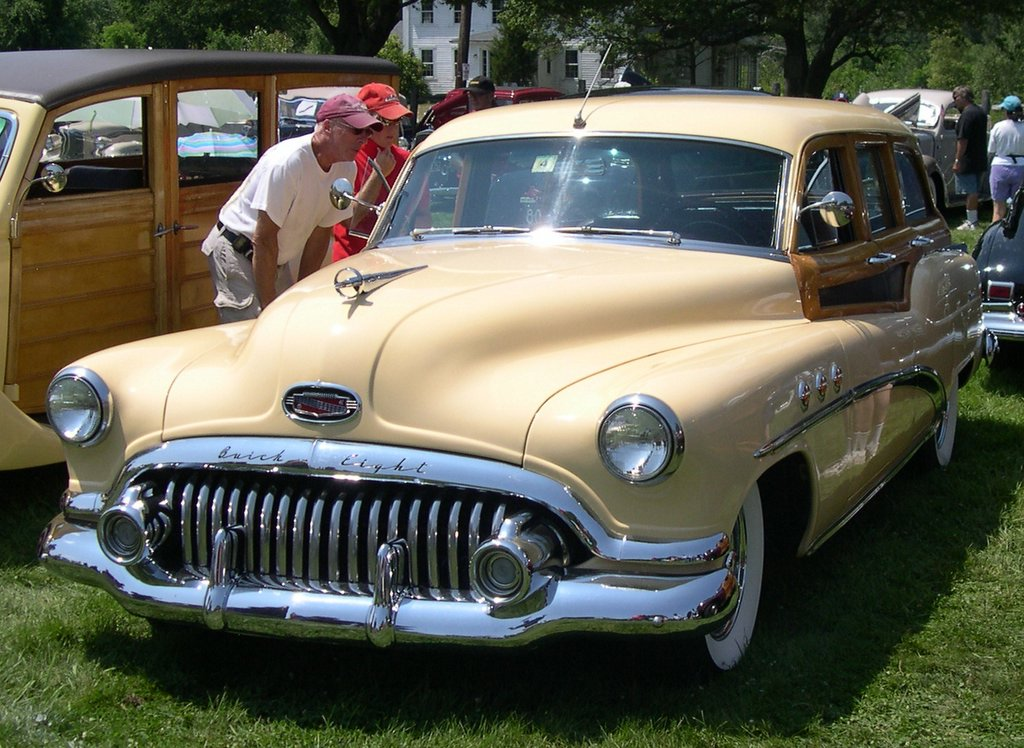
1952 Buick Super Estate Wagon

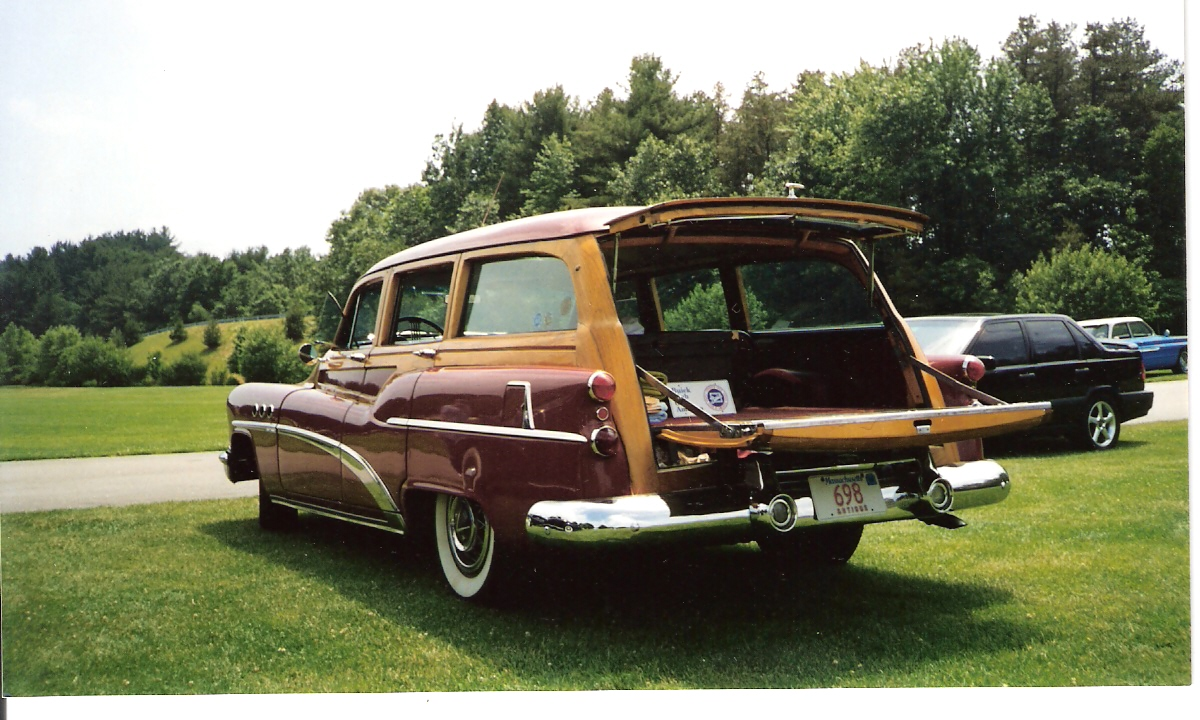
1953 Buick Super Estate Wagon, last of the genuine "woodies"

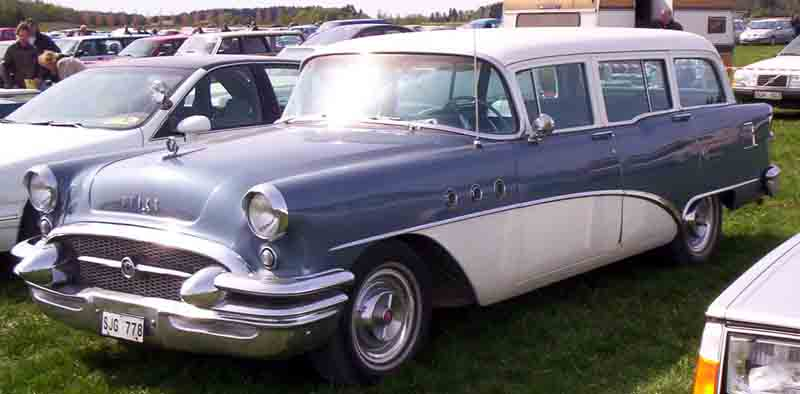
1955 Buick Special Station Wagon

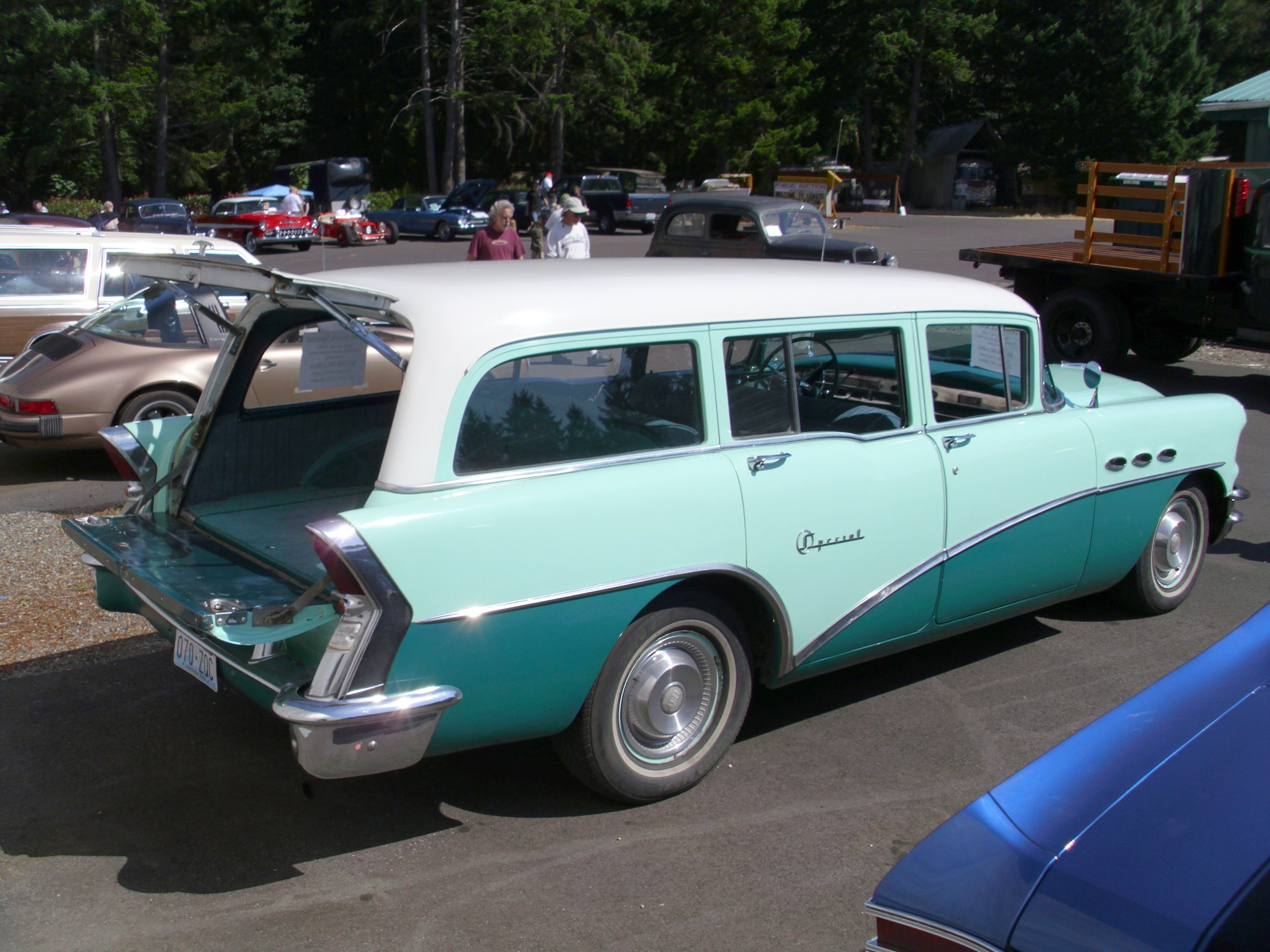
1956 Buick Special Estate

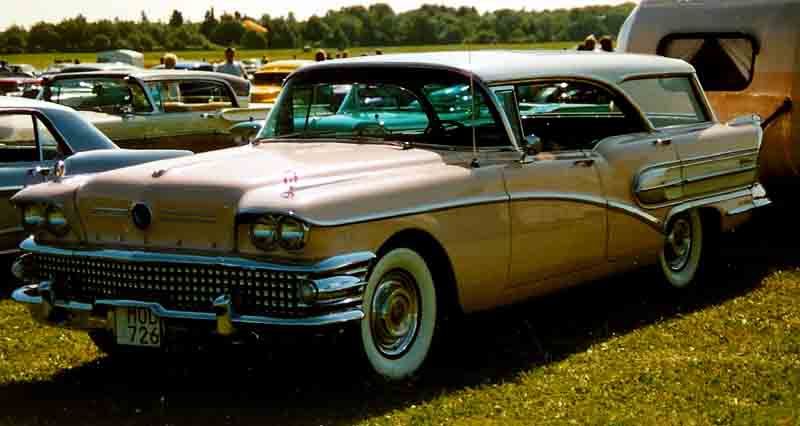
1958 Buick Century Caballero hardtop wagon

=== 1960s ===
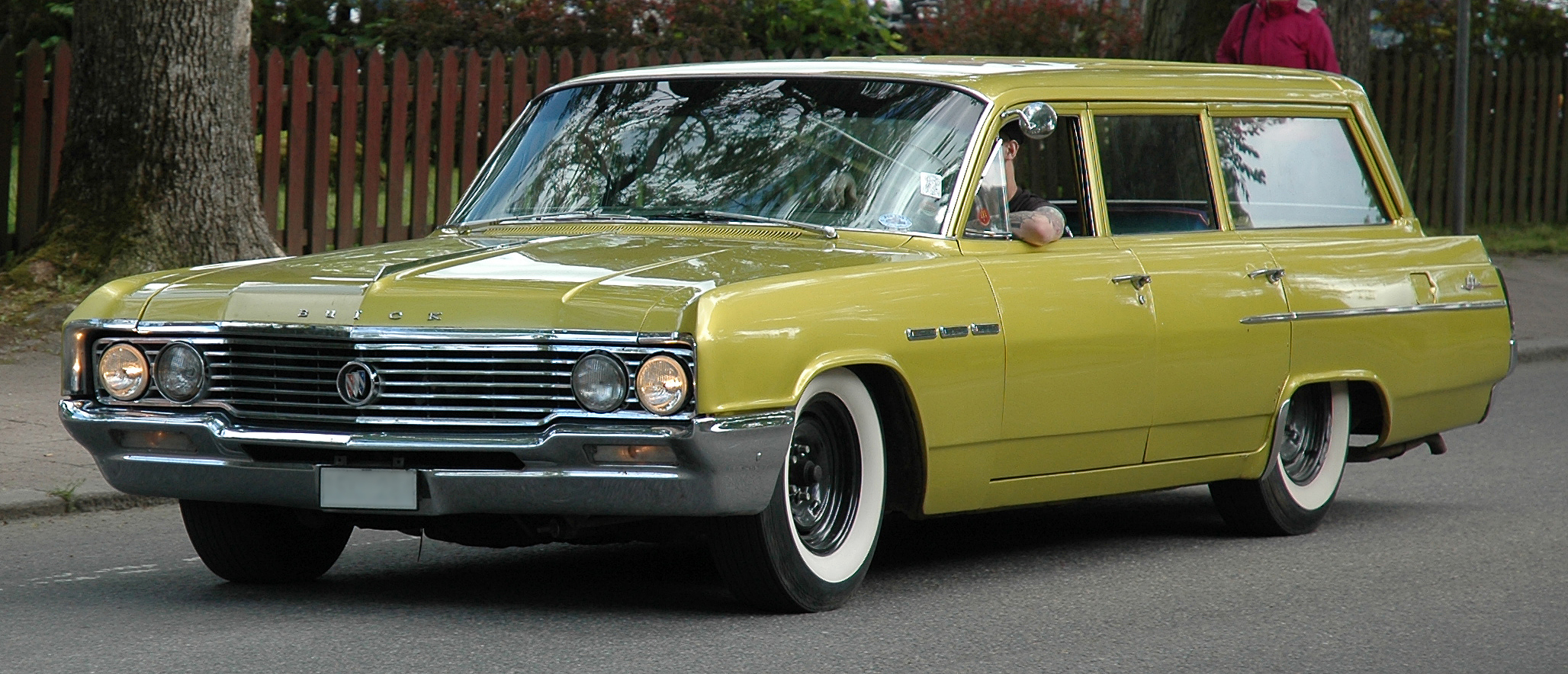
1964 Buick LeSabre Estate Wagon

1966 Buick Skylark Sport Wagon

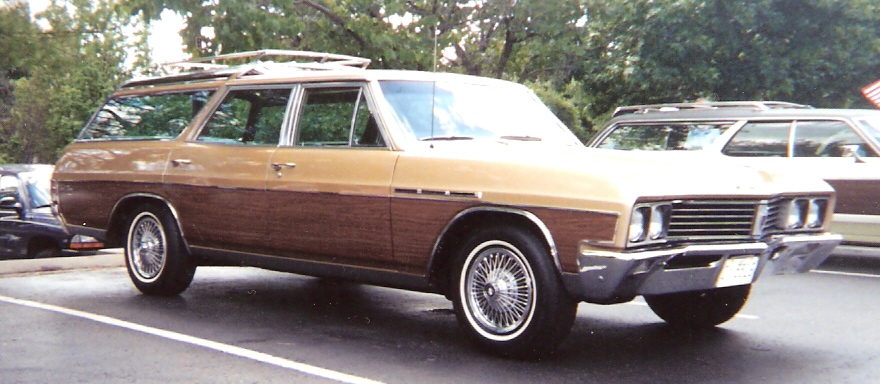
1967 Buick Skylark Sport Wagon Custom

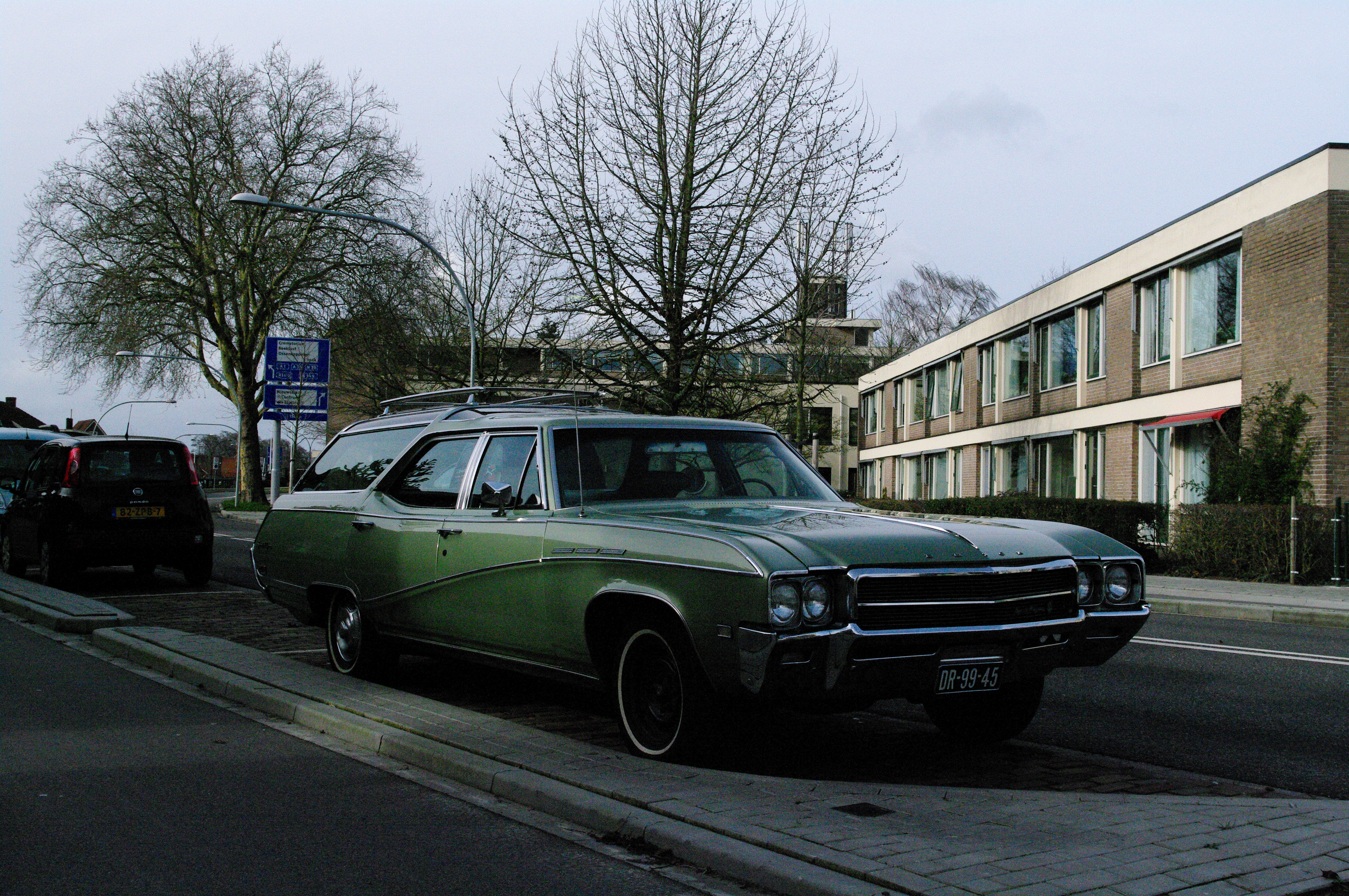
1969 Buick Skylark Sport Wagon

== 1970 ==
First Generation
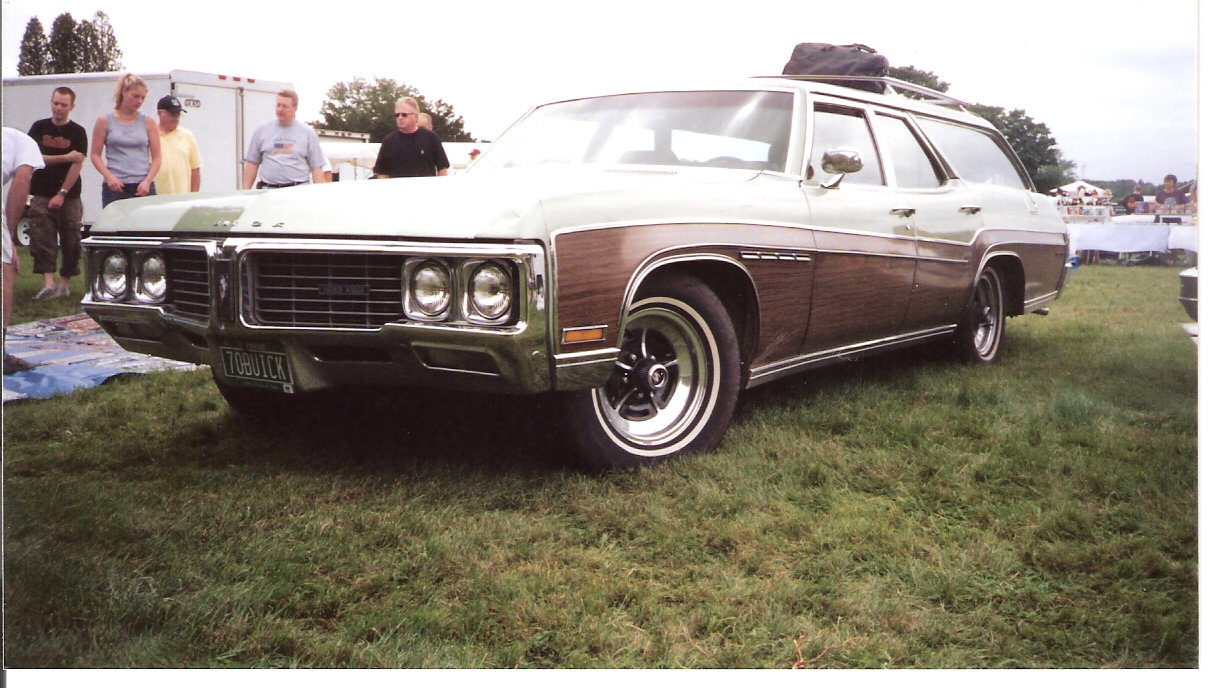

Overview
- Model years: 1970
- Assembly: (main plant); Flint, Michigan (Buick City); (branch assembly); Kansas City, Kansas (Fairfax Assembly); South Gate, California (South Gate Assembly); Wilmington, Delaware (Wilmington Assembly); Doraville, Georgia
- Designer: Bill Mitchell

Body and chassis
- Platform: B-body
- Related: Pontiac Bonneville Safari; Chevrolet Caprice Custom Estate

Powertrain
- Engine: 455 cu in (7.5 L) Buick V8
- Transmission: 3-speed TH-400, automatic

Dimensions
- Wheelbase: 124.0 in (3,150 mm)
- Length: 220.2 in (5,593 mm)
- Curb weight: 4,900–5,000 lb (2,200–2,300 kg)

The Buick Estate Wagon was introduced as a standalone nameplate, becoming the top-level luxury station wagon for GM in 1970 to compete against the Mercury Colony Park and Chrysler New Yorker Town & Country. Buick's first full-sized station wagon since 1964, it was available as a separate series on the B-body LeSabre chassis, sharing their 124.0-inch (3,150 mm) wheelbase, basic body and interior and took the senior position above the Buick Sport Wagon mid-sized station wagon, which was downsized onto the standard length A-body wagon platform for 1970. From 1967 until the Estate returned in 1970, GM's most upscale full-sized station wagon offering simulated woodgrained paneling was the Pontiac Executive Safari station wagon and Chevrolet Caprice Custom Estate. By special request from coachbuilders like ASC and Traditional Coachworks of Chatsworth, California the Cadillac Fleetwood was modified as a station wagon after the donor vehicle was completed.

The Estate returned to an earlier tradition during the 1940s and 1950s of positioning it as a luxury vehicle similar to the top-level Electra 225, with full power amenities, air conditioning and the available AM/FM radio, and included an optional roof installed luggage rack with a vinyl roof covering available. To accommodate various load duties, the second row bench seat had a 60/40 split for additional passengers and cargo while using the Buick 455 V8 for effortless driving. The listed retail price was US$5,047 ($41,842 in 2025 dollars) and 28,306 were manufactured

The LeSabre Custom's bright rocker, wheelhouse and rear lower fender moldings were used. Reviving a late 1940s "woodie" appearance Woodgrain using DI-NOC a vinyl wood-grained wrap was an option for the body sides, incorporating the traditional "Sweepspear" feature. Interiors were "Cordaveen" in the more upscale Custom trim package. Despite being on the B-body it shared the C-bodied division flagship Electra's luxurious accommodations and standard equipment and four VentiPorts on the front fenders. The following year the Estate would move up to Electra's larger body and more voluminous interior.

Adopting the interior layout of the intermediate Sport Wagon, the Estate used a rear facing third-row seat. With a total of eight-passenger accommodation (similar to the Chevrolet/GMC Suburban of the time), the first-generation Estate wagon was among the largest vehicles ever built by Buick.

Buick Estate Production Figures
| | Yearly Total |
|---|---|
| 1970 | 28,306 |

== 1971–1976 ==
Second Generation
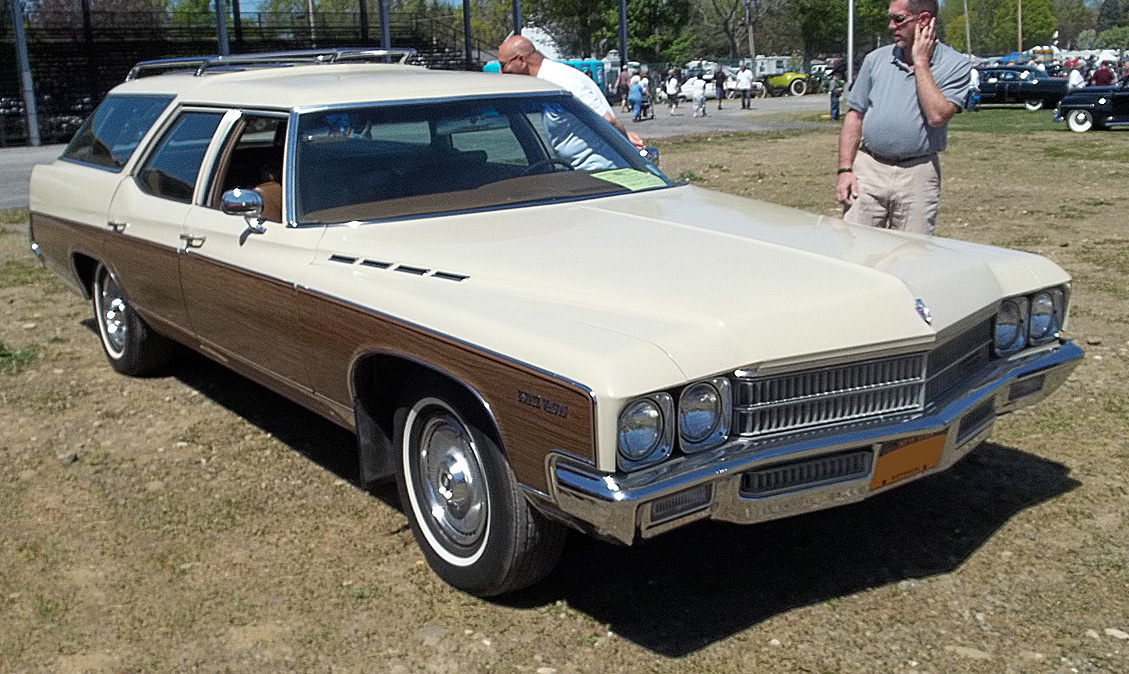
- 1971 Buick Estate Wagon

Overview
- Production: September 1970–August 1976
- Model years: 1971–1976
- Assembly: (main plant); Flint, Michigan (Buick City); (branch assembly); Kansas City, Kansas (Fairfax Assembly); South Gate, California (South Gate Assembly); Wilmington, Delaware (Wilmington Assembly)
- Designer: Bill Mitchell

Body and chassis
- Platform: C-body
- Related: Oldsmobile Custom Cruiser; Pontiac Grand Safari; Chevrolet Kingswood Estate

Powertrain
- Engine: 455 cu in (7.5 L) Buick V8
- Transmission: 3-speed TH-400, automatic

Dimensions
- Wheelbase: 127.0 in (3,226 mm)
- Length: 1971: 226.8 in (5,761 mm); 1972: 228.3 in (5,799 mm); 1973: 229.5 in (5,829 mm); 1974: 231.1 in (5,870 mm); 1975–76: 231.8 in (5,888 mm)
- Width: 1971–72: 79.7 in (2,024 mm); 1973: 79.6 in (2,022 mm); 1974–76: 79.9 in (2,029 mm)
- Height: 1971–1973: 57.3 in (1,455 mm); 1974: 57.9 in (1,471 mm); 1975: 58.4 in (1,483 mm); 1976: 57.8 in (1,468 mm)
- Curb weight: 5,100–5,400 lb (2,300–2,400 kg)

The 1971 to 1976 Estates were the first Buick station wagons to be built on GM longest chassis since the Roadmaster Estates of 1947–53. The Estate shared its 127.0-inch (3,230 mm) C-body wheelbase with the Electra 225, while all 1971–76 GM wagons were B-body-based per model numbers. The 1971–76 GM full-size bodies, at 64.3-inch (1,630 mm) front shoulder room and 63.4-inch (1,610 mm) rear shoulder room set a record for interior width that would not be matched by any car until the full-size GM rear-wheel drive models of the early to mid 1990s. The Estate also shared the Electra 225's interior and exterior styling from 1971 to 1974 (complete with the prerequisite four VentiPorts). Door trim and seats were not as plush in 1971–74 wagons and no door pull strap was included as it was on the Electra.

Although from 1975 to 1976 the number of VentiPorts were reduced by one, and the front fascia was downgraded to a LeSabre's (as was door trim and seats), the Electra 225 style chrome rocker panel moldings and distinctive Electra 225 style rear quarter panels (albeit without fender skirts) remained. The taillights were different from both the LeSabre and the Electra in all of these years. The Estate Wagons, as with other GM full-sized wagons during these years, used a rear suspension with multi-leaf springs instead of the coil springs used on other full-sized Buicks, and other full-sized GM cars to better cope with load carrying duties.

The Estate Wagons also featured a new 'clamshell' tailgate design, marketed as the Glide-away Tailgate, where the rear power-operated glass slid up into the roof as the lower tailgate (manually or with power assist), slid into a recess under the cargo floor. Ultimately, the manual lower tailgate was supplanted by the power tailgate. The tailgate system was operated by switches on the instrument panel or a key switch on the rear quarter panel. Like a top-hinged tailgate, the clamshell design allowed a user to stand directly at the open cargo area without impediment, facilitating loading and unloading in tight spaces. The rear seat could be folded flat for additional cargo and incorporated a 60/40 split so that extended cargo could be accommodated and additional passengers had entry to the optional forward-facing third row seat. If passengers were seated in the third row seat, the rear window could be retracted into the roof while the vehicle was in motion with the tailgate in place.

In its first year, 24,034 Estate Wagons were sold with a listed retail price of US$5,414 ($43,041 in 2025 dollars).

At 5,182 lb (2,351 kg) shipping weight, or about 5,400 lb (2,400 kg) curb weight, the three-seat 1974 Estate Wagons are easily the heaviest Buicks ever built, even heavier than the Buick Limited limousines of 1936–42. The 1975 and 1976 models were the longest station wagons ever built.

The Estate used the Buick 455 V8 from 1971 through 1976 found in the Buick GSX. The Stage One high performance version, with high lift camshaft, enlarged ports, enlarged valves, and dual exhaust, was available as an option through 1974.

To commemorate the Bicentennial of the United States, the standard colors available on all Buicks were Judicial Black, Liberty White, Pewter Gray, Potomac Blue, Continental Blue, Concord Green, Constitution Green, Mount Vernon Cream, Buckskin Tan, Musket Brown, Boston Red and Independence Red, with specially available colors on select models Congressional Cream, Revere Red, Colonial Yellow and Firecracker Orange.

Buick Estate Production Figures
| | Yearly Total |
|---|---|
| 1971 | 24,034 |
| 1972 | 28,968 |
| 1973 | 35,795 |
| 1974 | 14,412 |
| 1975 | 13,740 |
| 1976 | 20,374 |
| Total | 137,323 |

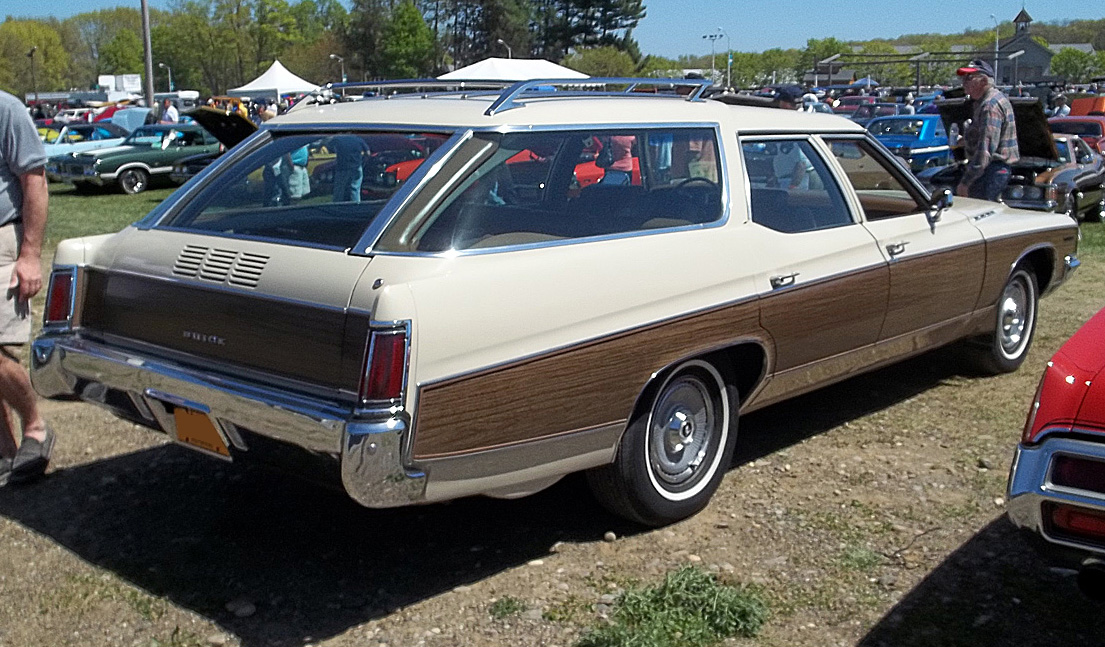
1971 Buick Estate Wagon

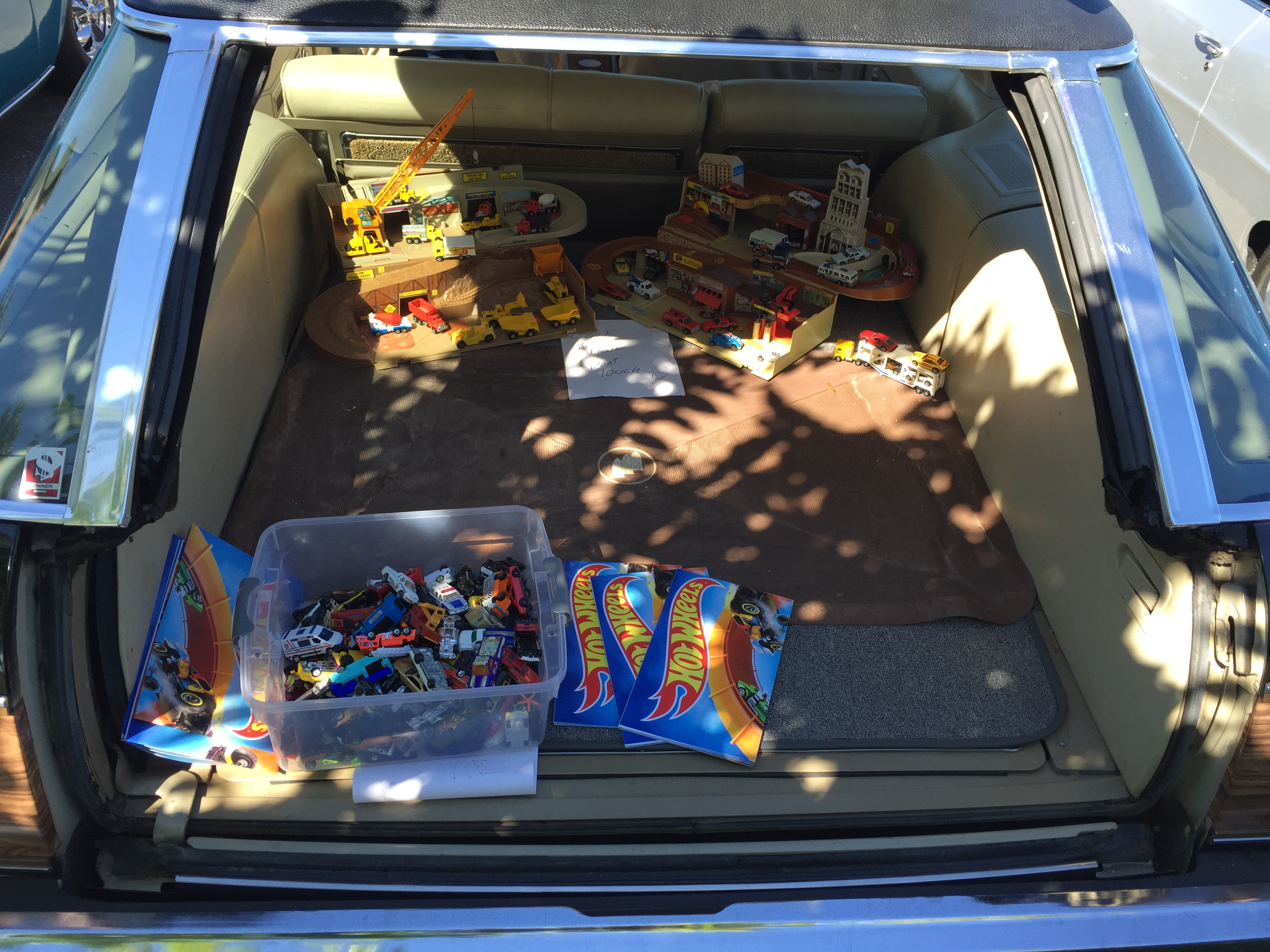
1971 Buick Estate with clamshell tailgate retracted

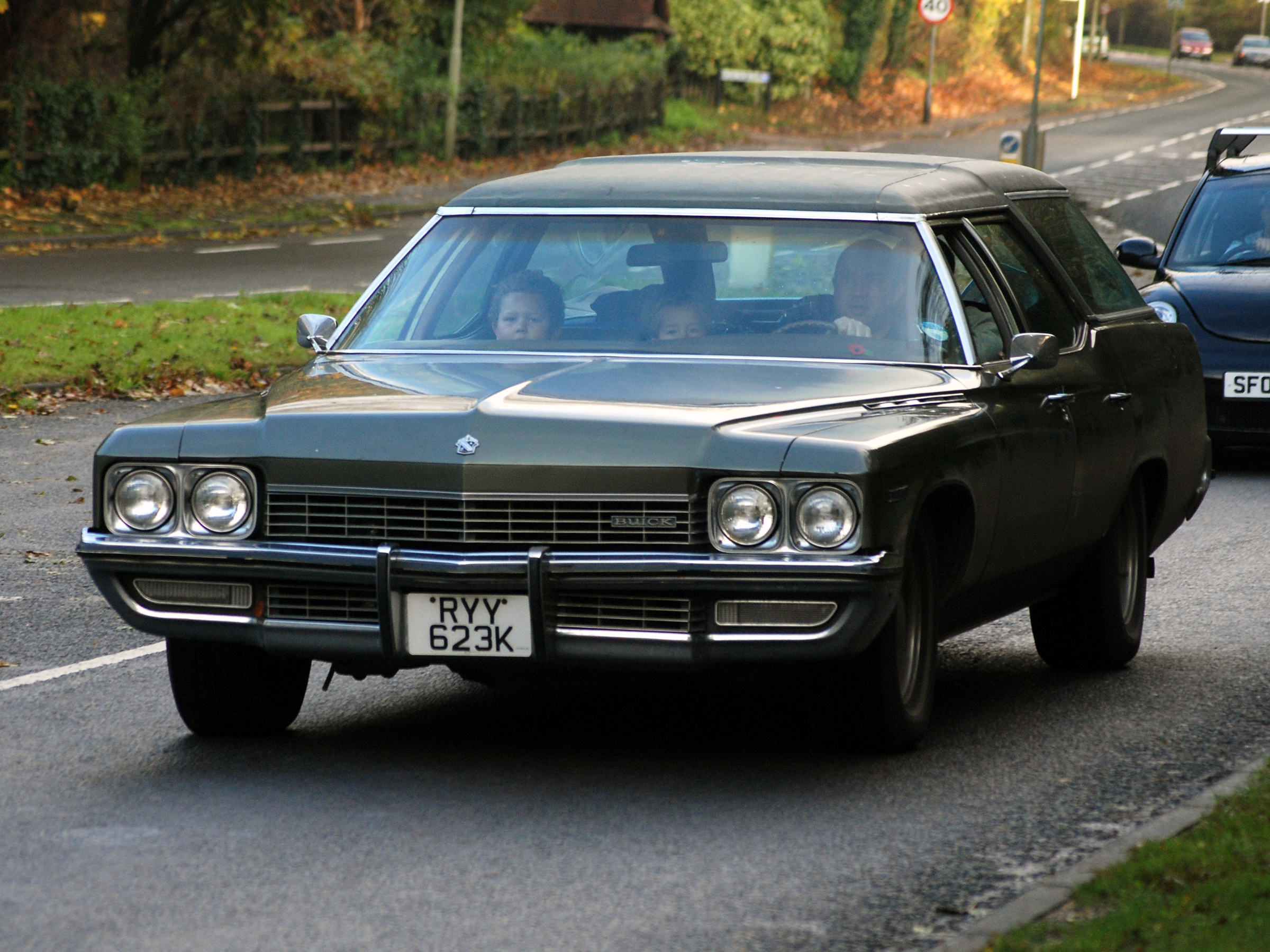
1972 Buick Estate Wagon

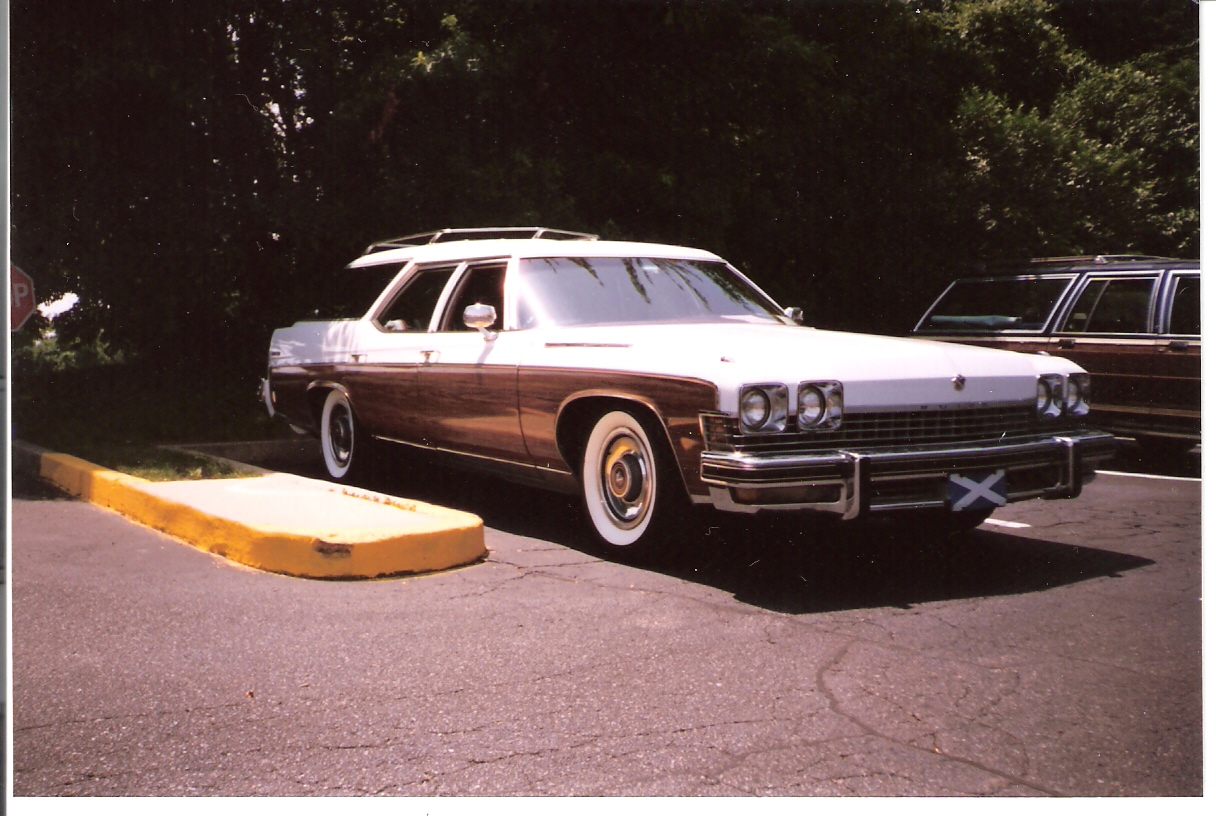
1974 Buick Estate Wagon

== 1977–1990 ==
Third Generation
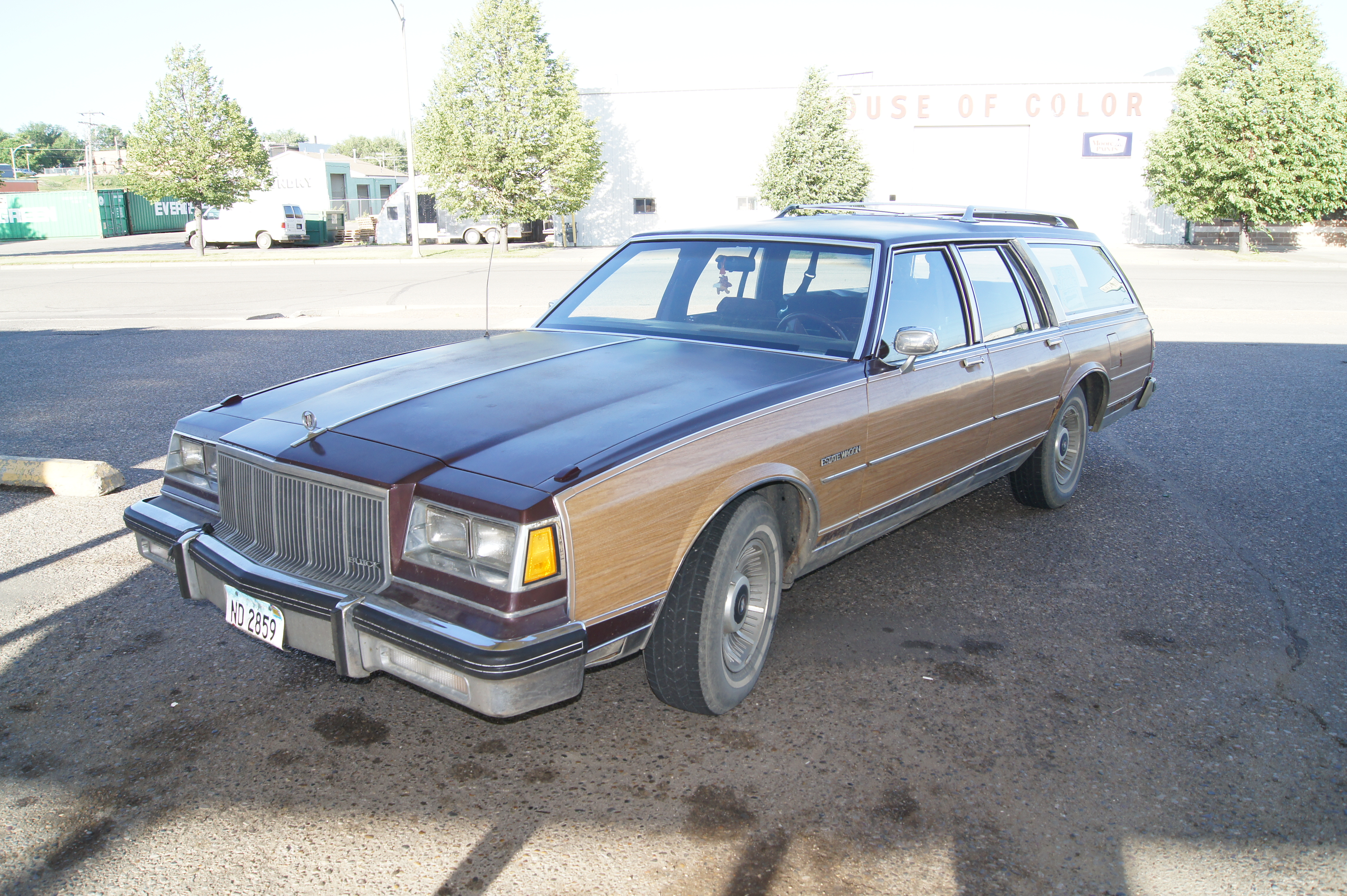
- 1990 Buick Estate

Overview
- Also called: Electra Estate, LeSabre Estate
- Model years: 1977–1990
- Assembly: Fairfax Assembly, Kansas, United States (1977–1987); Lakewood Assembly, Georgia, United States (1988–1990)

Body and chassis
- Platform: B-body
- Related: Oldsmobile Custom Cruiser; Pontiac Safari; Chevrolet Caprice Estate

Powertrain
- Engine: 307 cu in (5.0 L) Oldsmobile V8; 350 cu in (5.7 L) Buick V8; 403 cu in (6.6 L) Oldsmobile V8; 350 cu in (5.7 L) LF9 diesel V8
- Transmission: 3-speed automatic 4-speed automatic

Dimensions
- Wheelbase: 115.9 in (2,944 mm)
- Length: 218.8 in (5,558 mm); 220.5 in (5,601 mm) (1980–1990)
- Width: 75.4 in (1,915 mm); 79.3 in (2,014 mm) (1980–1990)
- Height: 57.1 in (1,450 mm); 59.5 in (1,511 mm) (1980–1990)

In 1977, the Buick Estate was downsized and relaunched on General Motors' B-body. In 1979, an Estate Wagon Limited was offered with many previously extra cost options now included as standard in addition to the Estate Wagon. To further differentiate the Limited model, fenders included four VentiPorts (up from three) and the interior had velour upholstery with loose pillow designed seating or vinyl with leather available in later years. Production records show 21,312 were built for 1979. An appearance change was introduced for the simulated woodgrain changing from mahogany to oak which was used for several decades. Cargo capacity with the second row seats in place was 87.9 cubic feet and the core chassis elements remained in use until 1996 when the GM station wagon production was terminated. When the Estate Wagon was introduced it had a shorter wheelbase than the 1964 Buick Sport Wagon.

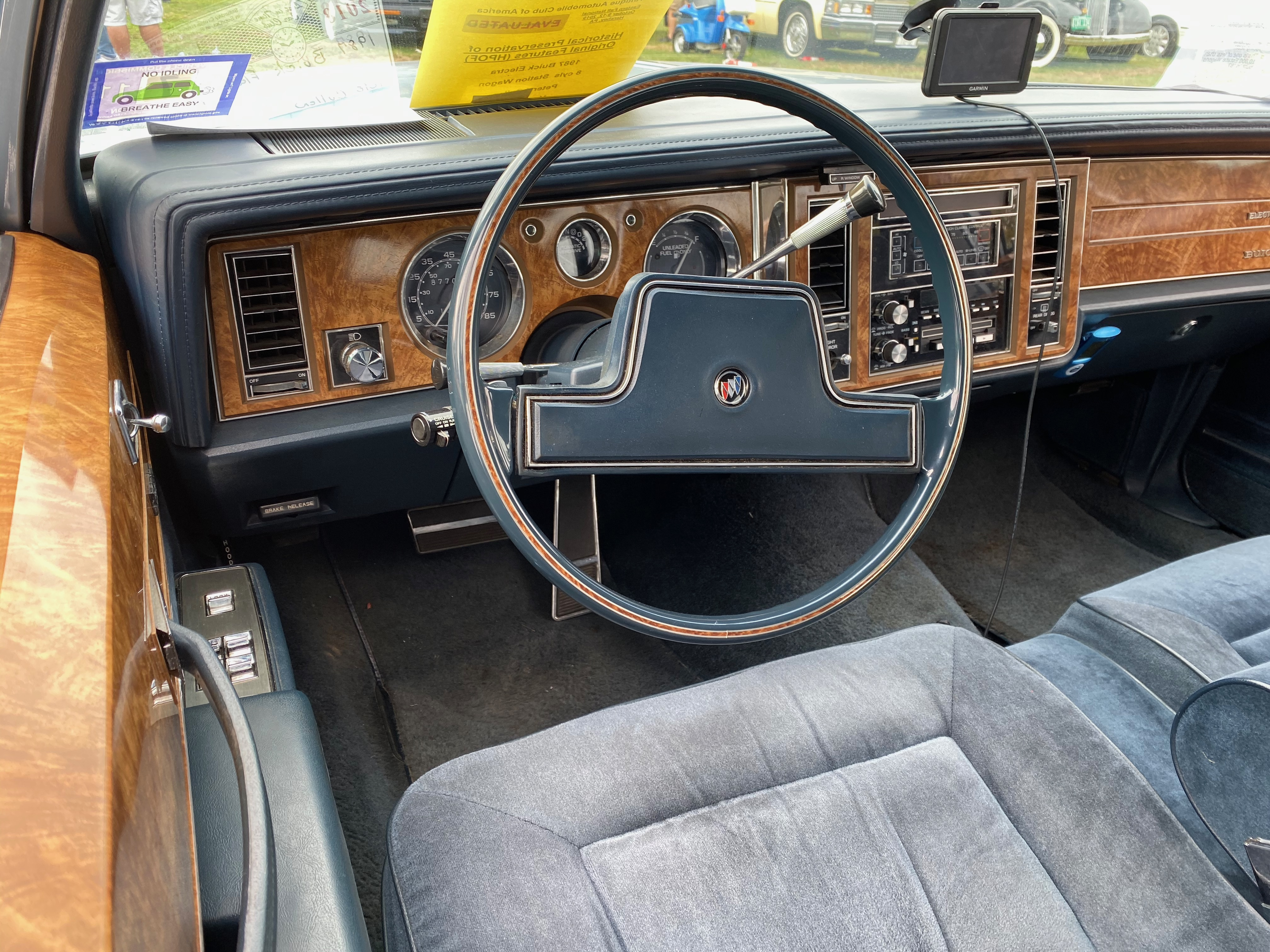
1987 Buick Electra Estate interior

The tradition of luxury continued with power windows, power adjustable drivers split bench seat, six speaker stereo system, dual power adjustable side view mirrors, Touch Climate Control air conditioning, GM's Twilight Sentinel automatic headlight activation and other luxury features found on the Buick Electra. The 1977 listed retail price was $6,078 ($32,293 in 2025 dollars) with the optional rear facing third row seat, while the "Dual-Action" tailgate was now standard equipment with a power retractable rear window on all GM station wagons.

In 1980, body changes made the wagon more aerodynamic for better fuel efficiency. Also, that year, the Electra Estate Wagon was introduced and replaced the Estate Wagon Limited while the 'base' model was now called LeSabre Estate Wagon. Exterior woodgrain applique was standard on the Electra Estate (but could be deleted for credit) and optional on the LeSabre Estate. The Buick 350 and Oldsmobile 403 V8 engines were dropped from the options list and a 5.7 litre diesel 350 V8 was now available through 1985. The standard engine was the 5.0 litre Oldsmobile 307 V8.

Although the Electra and LeSabre coupes and sedans had both switched to new front wheel drive platforms by 1986, the model names also continued to be used on the rear-wheel-drive wagons through 1989 making the Estate the largest rear wheel drive Buick offered.

For 1990, which would be the Estate's final year, the Electra and LeSabre model designations were dropped, and the car was once again sold simply as the Estate Wagon. As with the Electra Estate in previous years, standard exterior woodgrain could be deleted for credit. Although the Estate Wagon model was discontinued in 1990, the Estate trim designation continued on the full-size Roadmaster station wagons from 1991 to 1996. The Estate name was also applied to the top trim level of the mid-size Century station wagon (sold as the Regal Estate station wagon in 1982 and 1983) and often included exterior woodgrain applique. Like the Roadmaster, the Century Estate continued to be sold through 1996.

Production Figures

Buick Estate Production Figures
| | Yearly Total |
|---|---|
| 1977 | 25,075 |
| 1978 | 25,964 |
| 1979 | 21,312 |
| 1980 | 15,332 |
| 1981 | 11,268 |
| 1982 | 15,331 |
| 1983 | 18,887 |
| 1984 | 17,563 |
| 1985 | 13,366 |
| 1986 | 18,126 |
| 1987 | 12,759 |
| 1988 | 9,624 |
| 1989 | 7,531 |
| 1990 | 7,999 |
| Total | 220,137 |

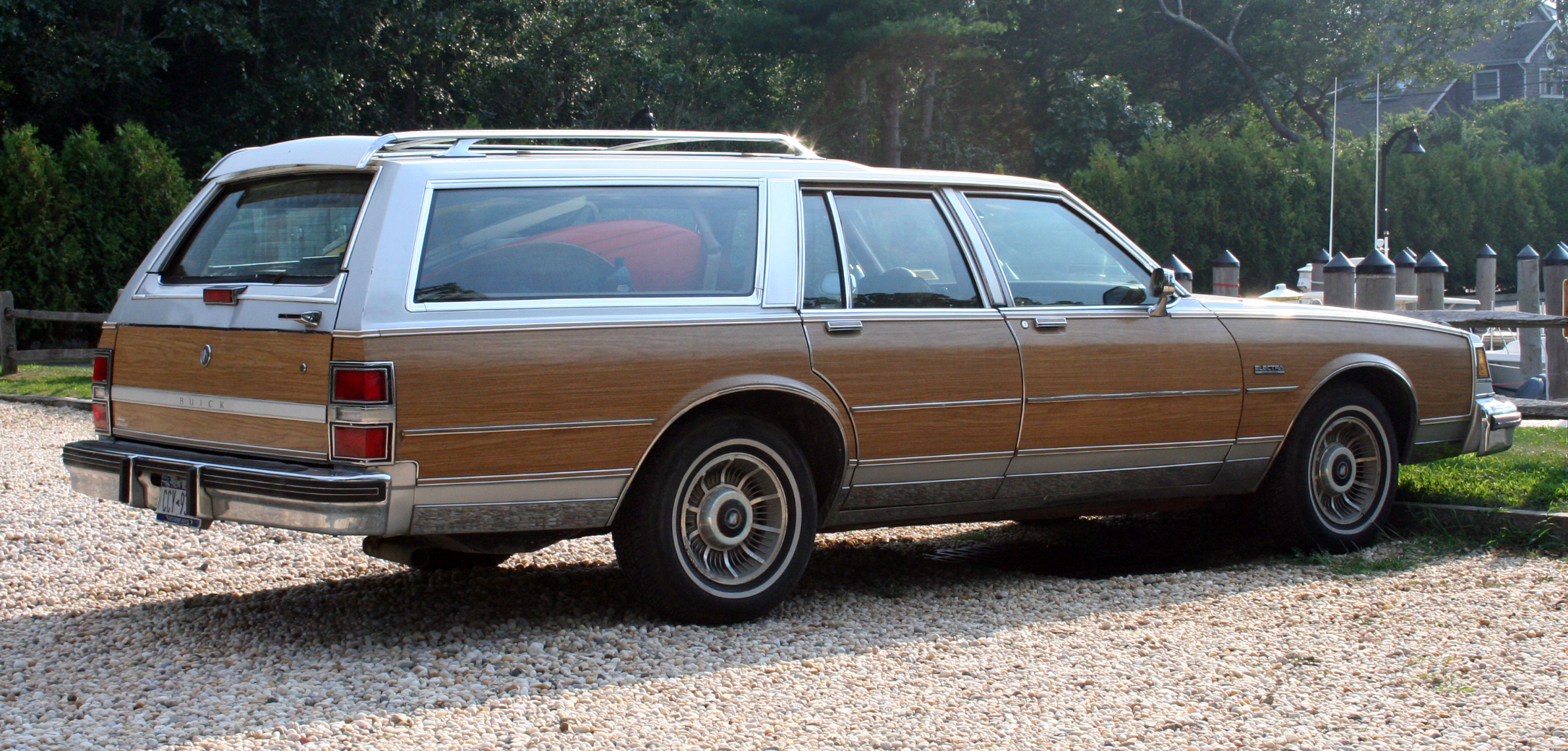
1980-1989 Buick Electra Estate Wagon

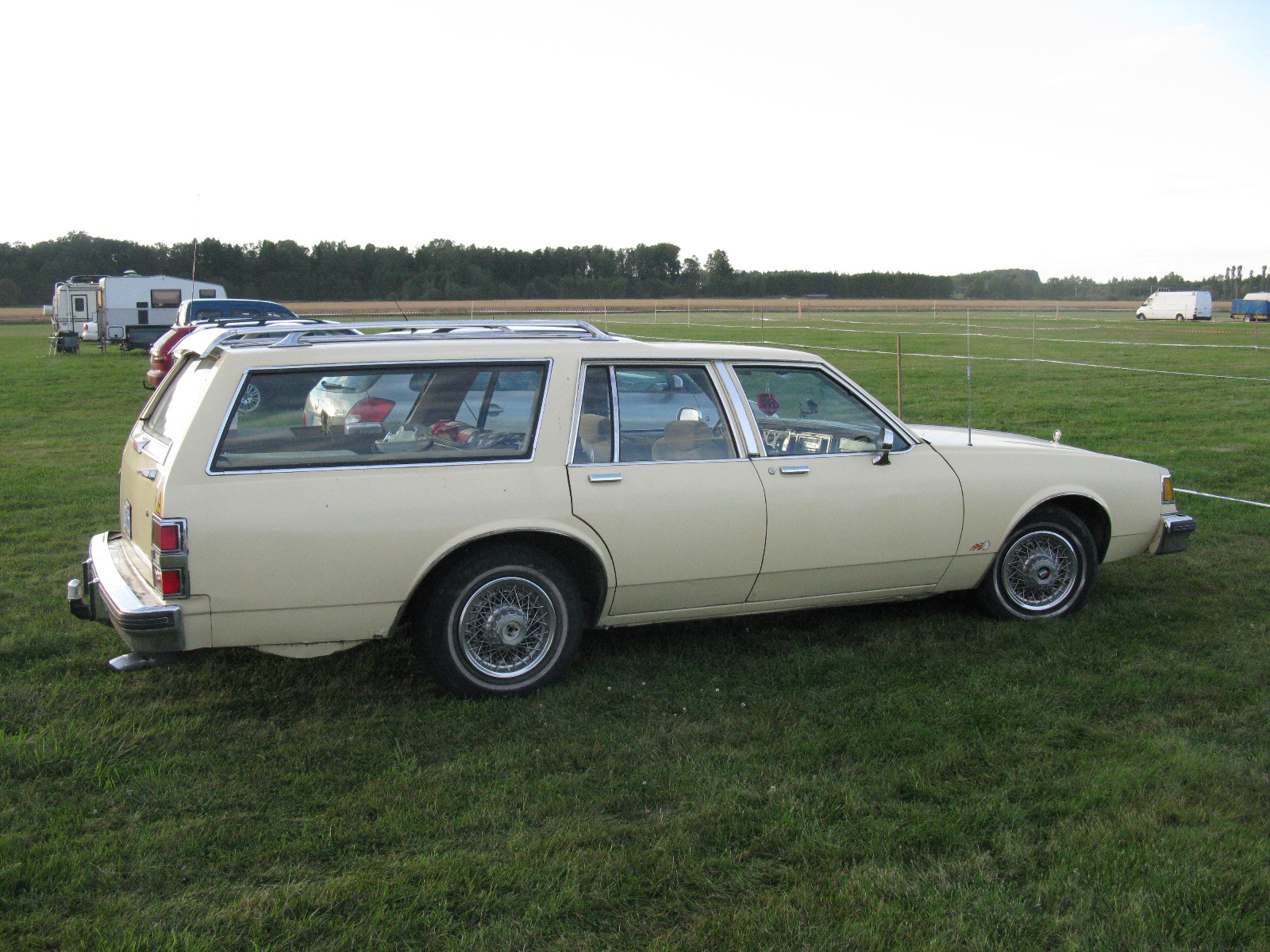
1986 Buick Electra Estate Wagon

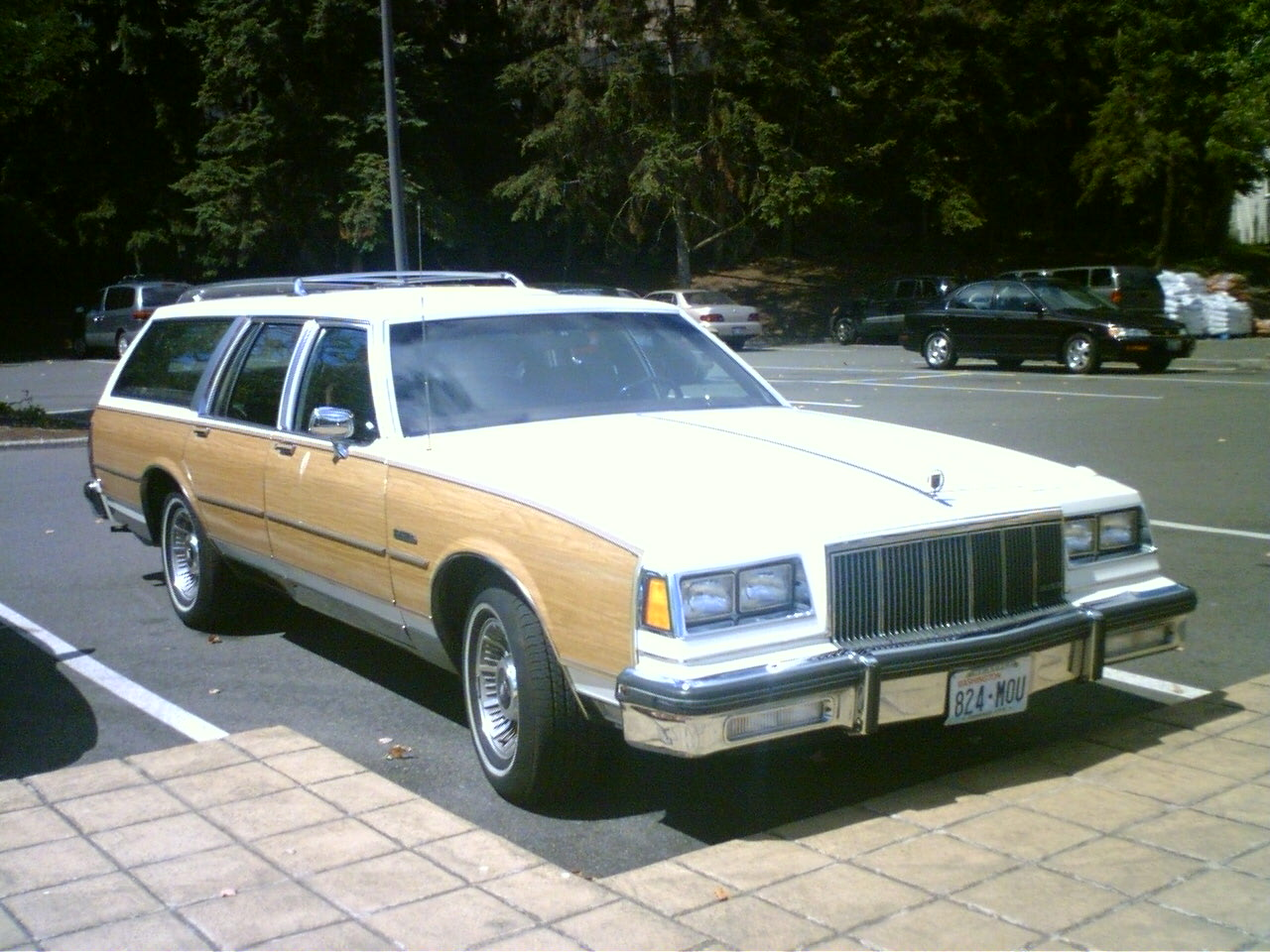
1982 Buick Electra Estate Wagon

== 1991–1996 ==
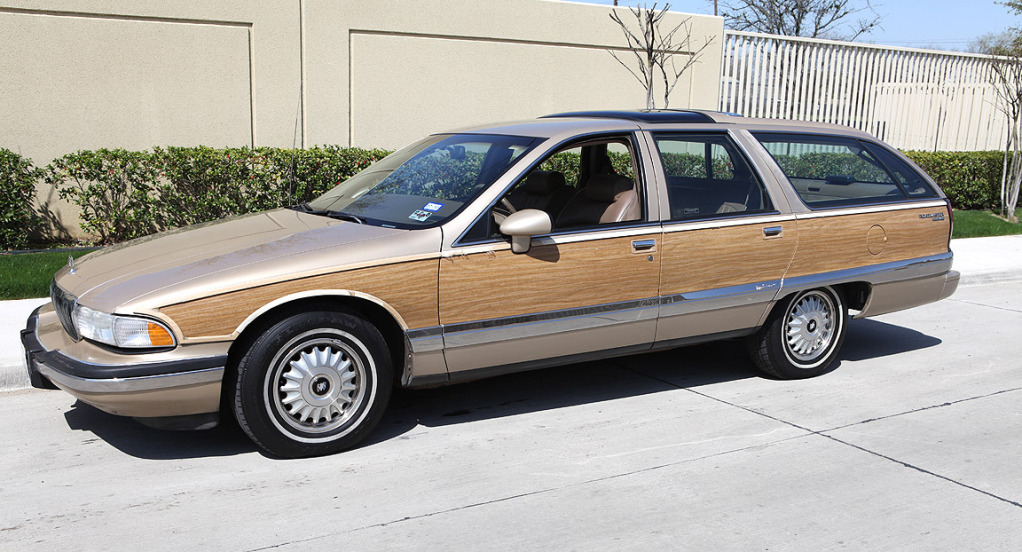
1993 Buick Roadmaster Estate Limited

Buick revived the Roadmaster name with the introduction of the Roadmaster Estate in 1991. A "Vista Roof" fixed sunroof over the second row seats, was standard. Initially the Roadmaster Estate used Chevrolet's 5.0 L L03 V8. It was replaced a year later with a 180hp 5.7L small-block L05 V8 shared by both wagon and sedan. In 1994 both received a modified dual-exhaust version of the advanced Corvette-derived 5.7L sequential point fuel-injection LT1 V8, increasing output to 260hp and upping performance substantially. The same engine was used on the Impala SS, Chevrolet police interceptors, and the Cadillac Fleetwood, with an aluminum head version on the Corvette C4, Camaro Z-28, and Firebird Trans-AM. A high-performance engine had last been offered on a GM station wagon in 1974.

GM discontinued the Roadmaster Estate in 1996, ending production on December 13 of that year.

== Sources ==
- Flory, J. "Kelly", Jr. American Cars 1960–1972. Jefferson, NC: McFarland & Coy, 2004.
