= General Motors C platform =

The C platform, or C-body, name has been used twice by General Motors for its full-size car platform.

- 1925–1984 General Motors C platform (RWD)
- 1985–1996 General Motors C platform (FWD)
