= Buick Special =

20th Century entry-level luxury passenger car from Buick

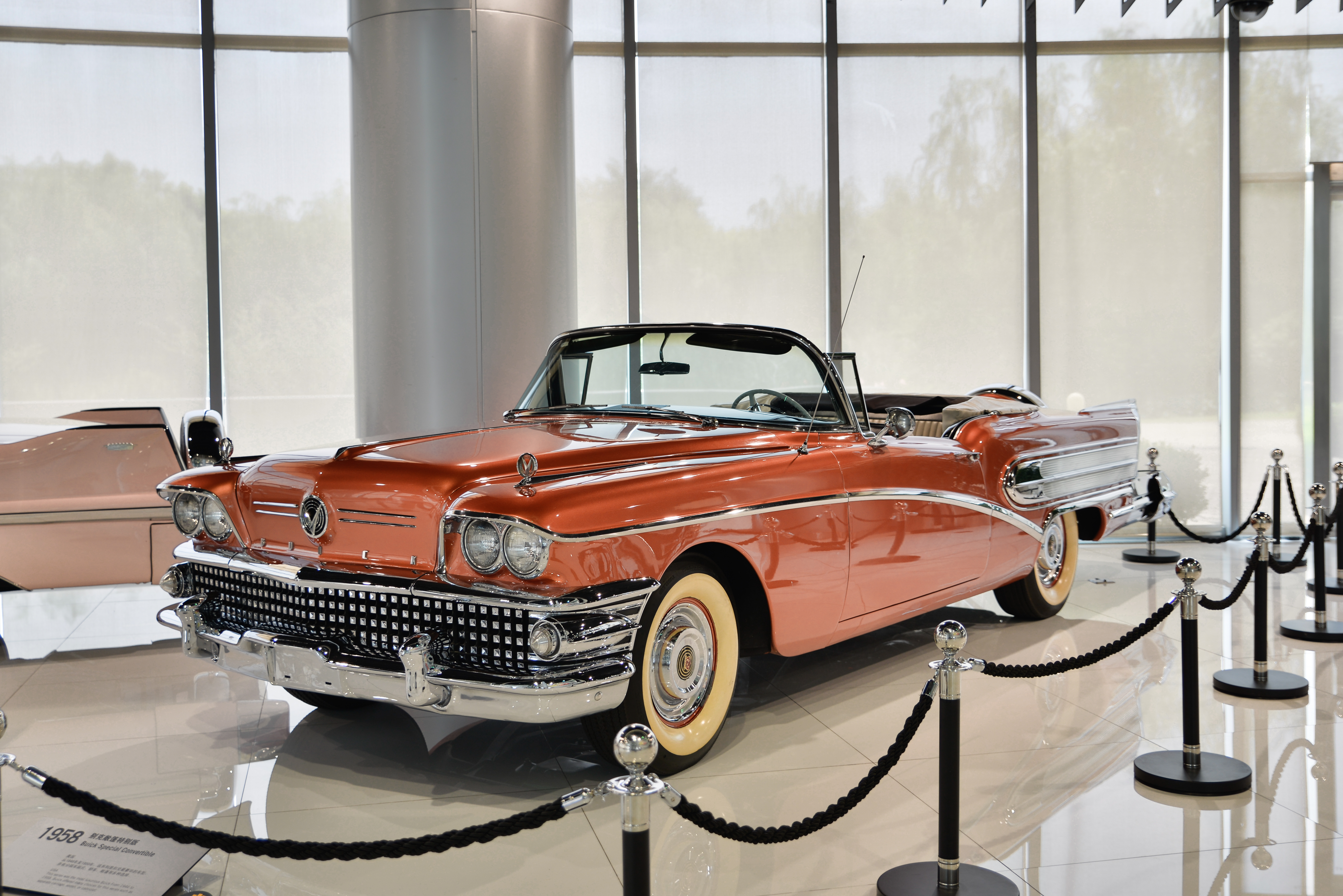
- 1958 Buick Special Convertible

Overview
- Manufacturer: Buick (General Motors)
- Production: 1936–1942; 1946-1958; 1961–1969
- Designer: Harley Earl

Body and chassis
- Class: Full-size (1936–1958); Compact (1961-1963); Mid-size (1964–1969)
- Layout: FR layout

Chronology
- Predecessor: Marquette Model 30; Buick Standard Six
- Successor: Buick LeSabre (1959 full-size); Buick Skylark (1970 mid-size)

The Buick Special was an automobile produced by Buick. It was usually Buick's lowest-priced model, starting out as a full-size car in 1936 and returning in 1961 (after a two-year hiatus) as a compact, changed to mid-size in 1964. The Special was built for several decades and was offered as a coupe, sedan and later as a station wagon. When GM modernized their entry level products in the 1960s, the Special introduced the modern Buick V6 that became a core engine for GM for several decades and lived on in upgraded form until 2006.

By 1970, Special was no longer offered as a standalone model but the name would later be used for the entry trim on 1975 to 1979 and 1991 to 1996 Century models.

The entry level Buick can trace its heritage to the Buick Model 10, a companion to Buick's first car, the Buick Model B. The Model 10 started out as one of the independent brands merged into Buick, called the Janney.

== Series 40 (1930, 1934–1935) ==
Series 40
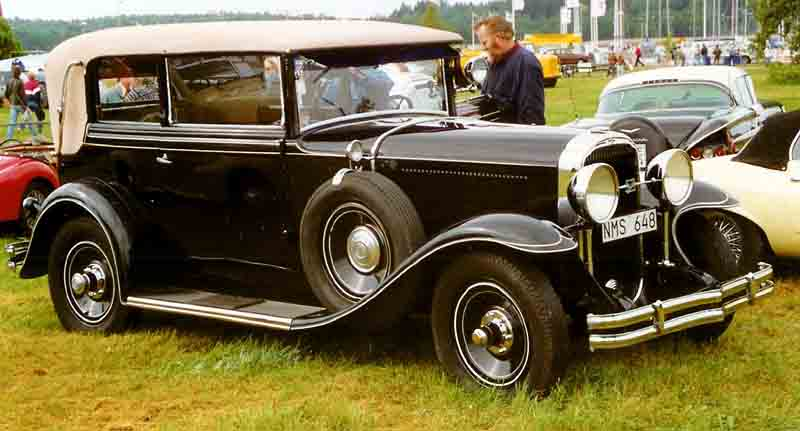
- 1930 Series 40 convertible

Overview
- Model years: 1930; 1934-1935
- Assembly: Flint Wagon Works, Flint, Michigan, United States
- Designer: Harley Earl

Body and chassis
- Class: Full-size car
- Body style: 2-door coupe 2-door convertible 4-door phaeton 4-door sedan
- Layout: Front-engine, rear-wheel-drive
- Platform: GM B platform
- Related: McLaughlin-Buick

Powertrain
- Engine: 257.5 cu in (4.2 L) Buick Straight-6 engine OHV I6; 233 cu in (3.8 L) Buick Straight-8 engine OHV I8
- Transmission: 3-speed synchromesh manual

Dimensions
- Wheelbase: 117 in (2,972 mm); 118 in (2,997 mm)

When the Series 40 was introduced, it had the 257.5 cu in (4,220 cc) overhead valve Buick Straight-6 engine that produced 80.5 bhp of power at 2,800 rpm, and 74,257 examples were made, being the highest number of Buicks for 1930. For the year 1931, the Series 40 was temporarily discontinued, with the introduction of the Marquette Model 30 and the Series 50 being repositioned as the Buick entry level product. The 1935 version returned with the 233.0 cu in (3,818 cc) Buick Straight-8 engine and 93 bhp. Starting with this generation, all GM cars shared a corporate appearance as a result of the Art and Color Section headed by Harley Earl and modest yearly changes were introduced to freshen the appearance.

1933 was the first year all GM vehicles were installed with optional vent windows which were initially called “No Draft Individually Controlled Ventilation” later renamed "Ventiplanes" which the patent application was filed on Nov. 28, 1932. It was assigned to the Ternstedt Manufacturing Company, a GM subsidiary that manufactured components for Fisher Body and they were added to the Special when it was introduced in 1935. Additional manufacturing locations also opened across the country under the Buick-Oldsmobile-Pontiac Assembly Division. The Series 40 was the most affordable Buick offered, with 6 body styles offered, and the five passenger Sedan Model 41 was US$925 ($21,722 in 2025 dollars), while a LaSalle Series 50 was US$1,000 ($24,067 in 2025 dollars) more. A standard feature offered on all Buicks was a dashboard mounted selector handle that would alter spark timing and allow either low grade or premium fuel to be used. In 1936 the name changed to "Special".

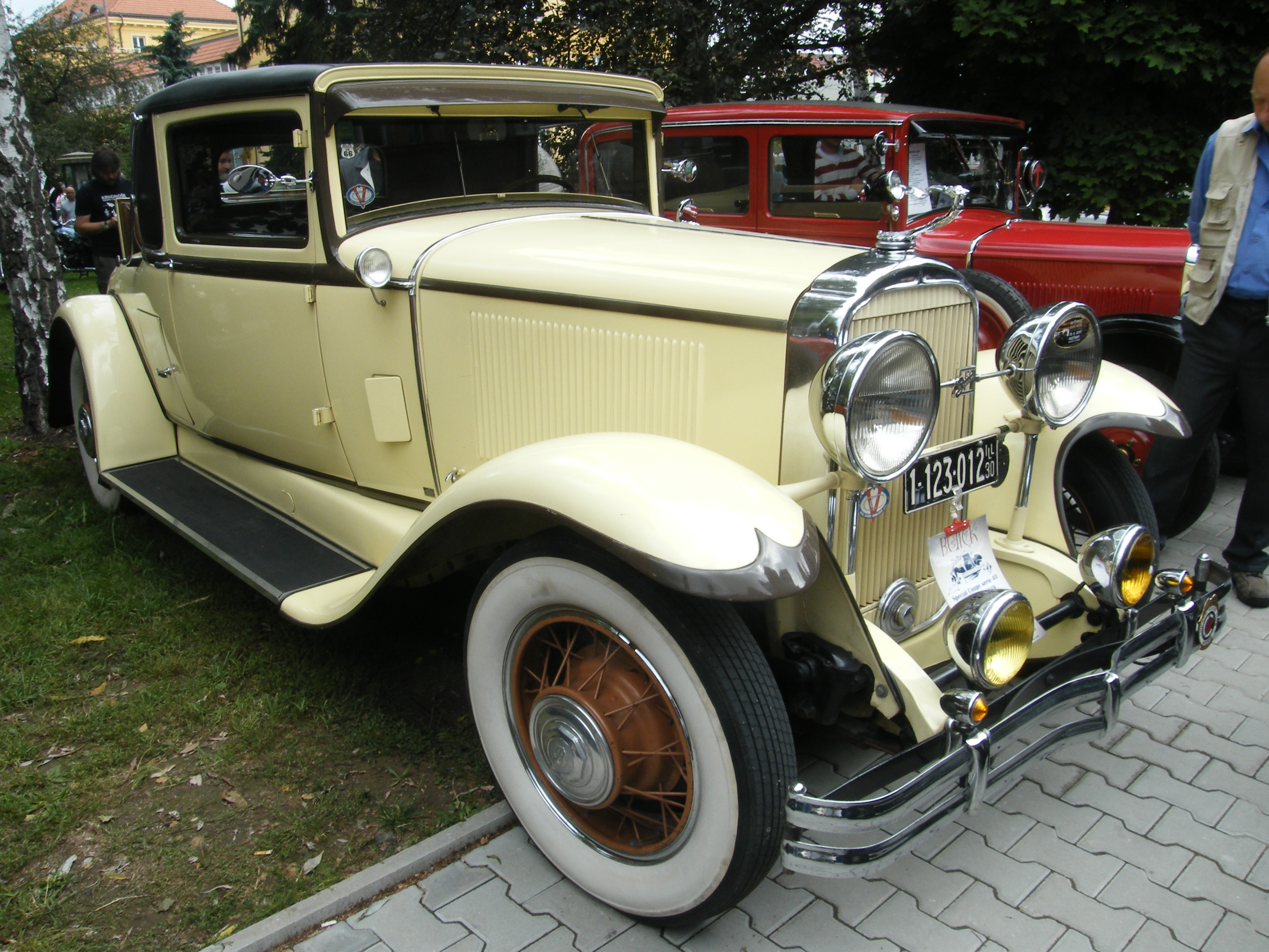
1930 Buick Series 40 coupe

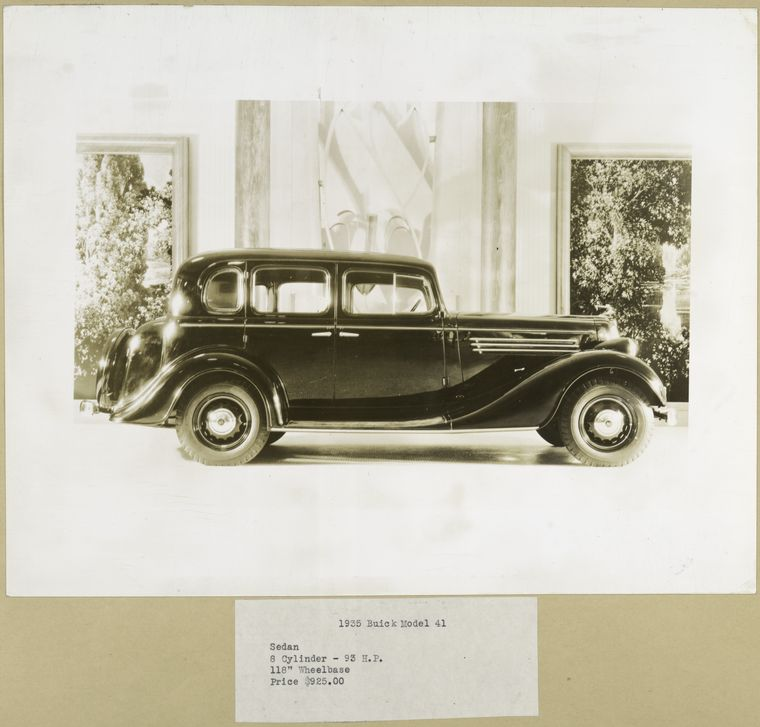
1935 Buick Series 40 sedan

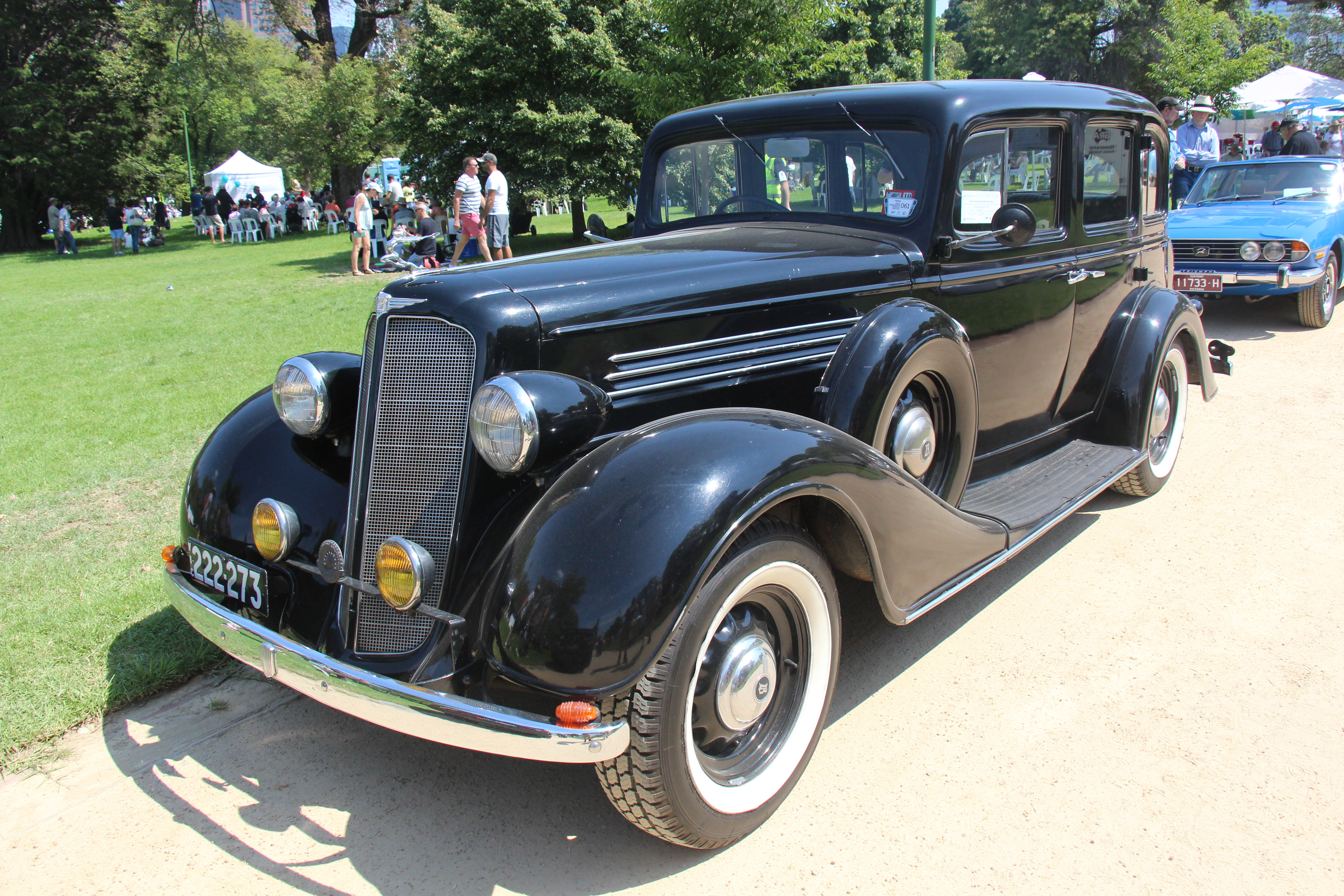
1935 Buick Series 40 sedan

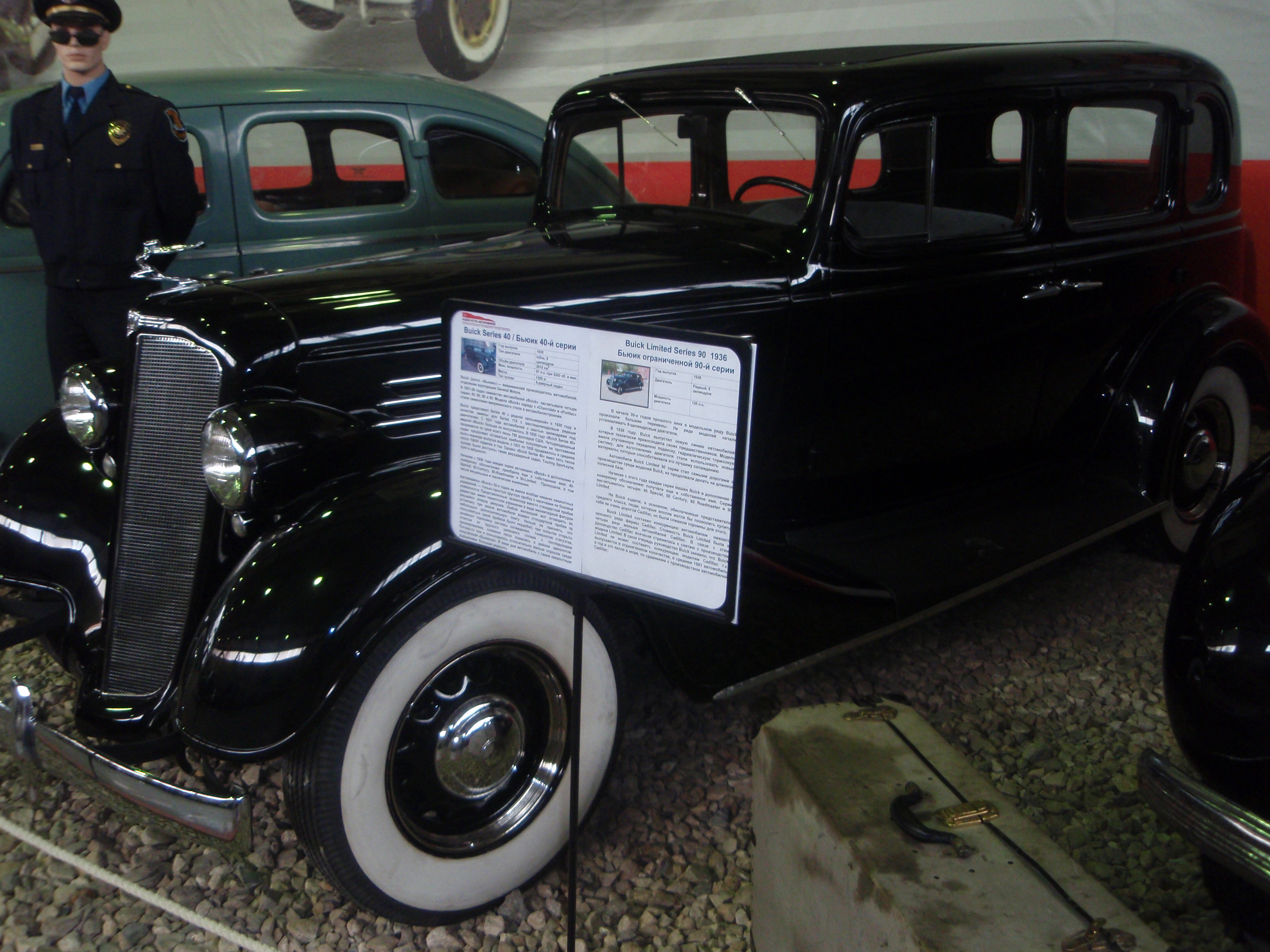
Buick Series 40 Sedan

== 1936–1942, 1946–1949 ==
Series 40
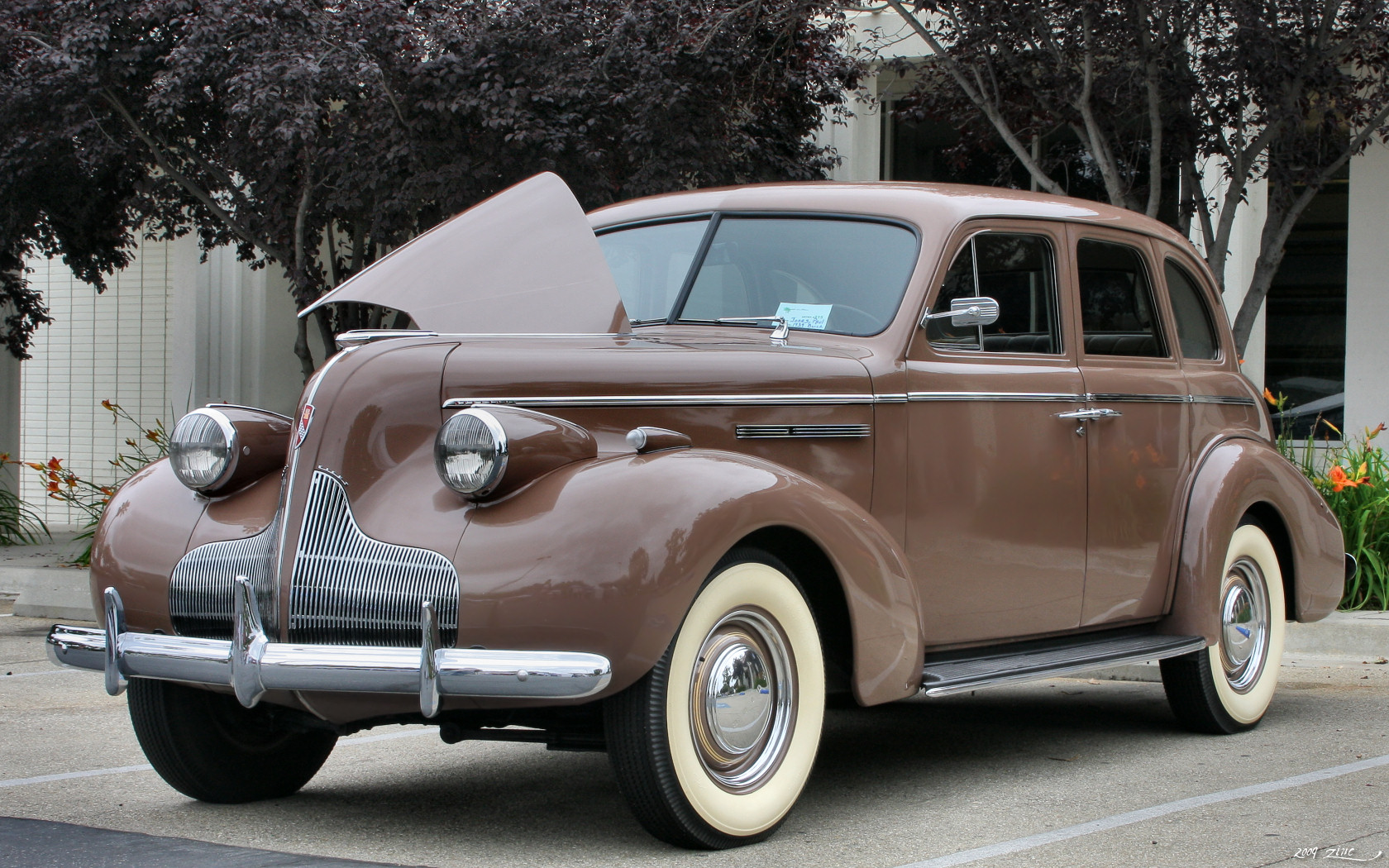
- 1939 Buick Special Four-Door Sedan

Overview
- Model years: 1936–1942, 1946–1949
- Assembly: (Main plant); Buick City, Flint, Michigan (branch assembly); Fairfax Assembly, Kansas City, Kansas (1946-1949); Linden Assembly, Linden, New Jersey; South Gate Assembly, South Gate, California

Body and chassis
- Body style: 2-door coupe 2/4-door sedan 2/4-door convertible 4-door Estate station wagon (1941–1942 only)
- Platform: GM B platform
- Related: Cadillac Series 60; Cadillac Series 61; LaSalle Series 50; McLaughlin-Buick; Buick Century; Oldsmobile F-Series; Oldsmobile Series 70; Pontiac Streamliner Torpedo

Powertrain
- Engine: 233 cu in (3.8 L) OHV I8; 248 cu in (4.1 L) OHV I8
- Transmission: 3-speed synchromesh manual Automatic Safety Transmission (1938 only); 4-speed semi-automatic

Dimensions
- Wheelbase: 118–122 in (2,997–3,099 mm)

Starting with 1936, the Buick Special Series 40 model range represented the marque's entry level full-size automobile. The '36 was a very successful year for Buick and also marked the first time of using names rather than the simple serial numbers which had been in use before. The first Specials rode on a 118 in (3.0 m) wheelbase, but for the next model year this was increased to 122 in (3.10 m) as all Buicks grew for that year. The eight cylinder engine was also new, and was now of 248 cu in (4.1 L) rather than 233 cu in (3.8 L). The Special (and all other Buicks as well) underwent a full restyling for 1939, with a more enclosed nose and a wider grille. The wheelbase was also two inches shorter.

For 1940, there was the usual restyle and the wheelbase increased by an inch. This was also the only model year that a four-door convertible Special ("Sport Phaeton") was offered, although only 552 were built. Prices started at US$795 ($18,445 in 2025 dollars) for the Business Coupe to US$925 ($21,461 in 2025 dollars) for either the 4-door Touring Sedan or 2-door Convertible.

For 1941 the bodywork was again all new, with the front fenders now very closely integrated into the cars overall design. The Estate Wagon migrated from being a Super into the Special lineup. A fastback was offered in Century and 40 Special trim as a four-door touring sedan and two-door business coupe and the 46S sedanette. Also new was the 40-A series (the regular Special now being the 40-B), a version on a three inches shorter wheelbase which shared its body with the 1941 Oldsmobile Series 70. These two series, with a restyle reminiscent of the 1939 Y-Job, continued into the abbreviated 1942 model year. Production ended on 4 February 1942. The Special was now offered as the entry-level luxury vehicle that the LaSalle previously held.

After production resumed, only the larger 1946 B-body Special range remained available, which is rare, representing less than two percent of Buick's production that year. The Special continued with minor changes until the prewar body was finally replaced halfway through the 1949 model year. Post-war Specials were only available as a four-door sedan or a two-door "sedanet", until the new 1949 models arrived.

In the movie Mildred Pierce, Veda Pierce, Mildred's daughter, played by actress Ann Blyth, was given a 1940 Buick Special convertible as a gift, valued at US$1,077 for the Model 46C ($24,751 in 2025 dollars).

The movie Small Town Conspiracy features a 1939 Buick Special 8 that the main character of the film John Haleran (Zen Gesner) drives as his official police car. The car remained the property of director Ralph Clemente and was untouched for many years until sold to Florida restorer and car collector Axel Caravias.

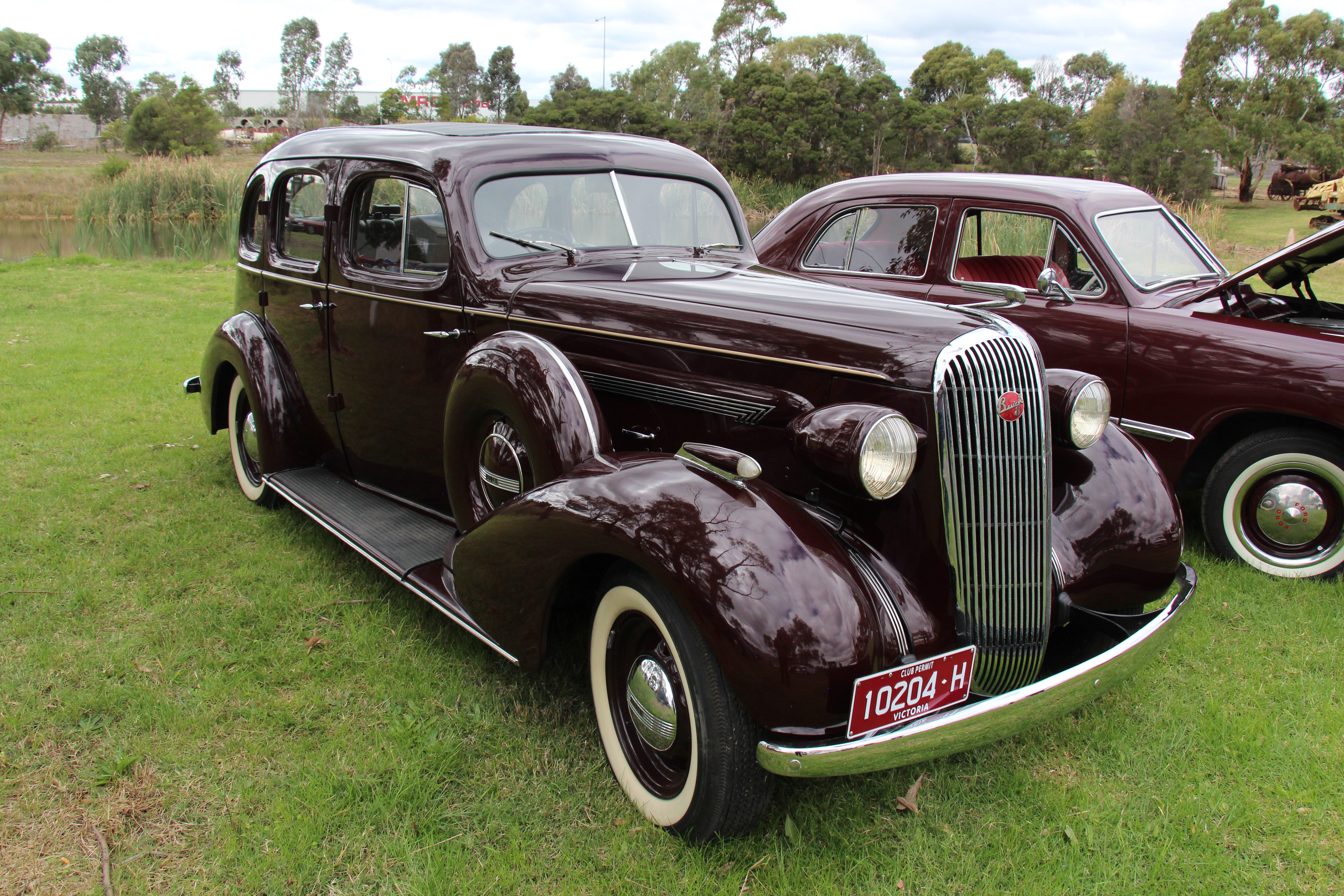
1936 Buick Special Series 40 Sedan

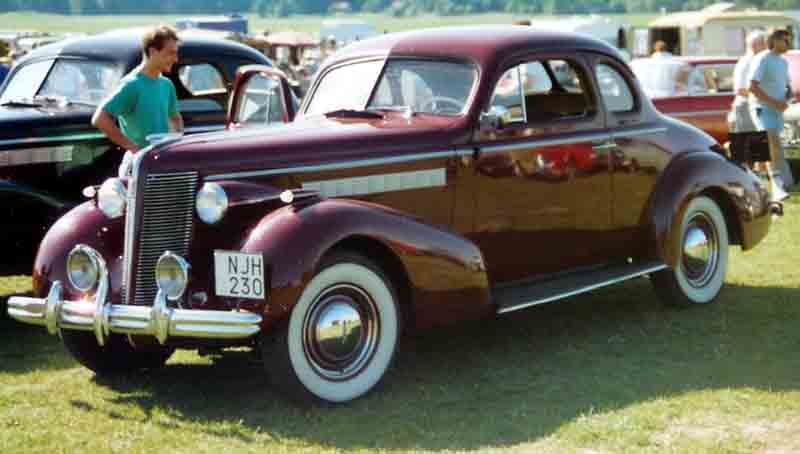
1937 Buick Special Series 40 Sport Coupe Model 465

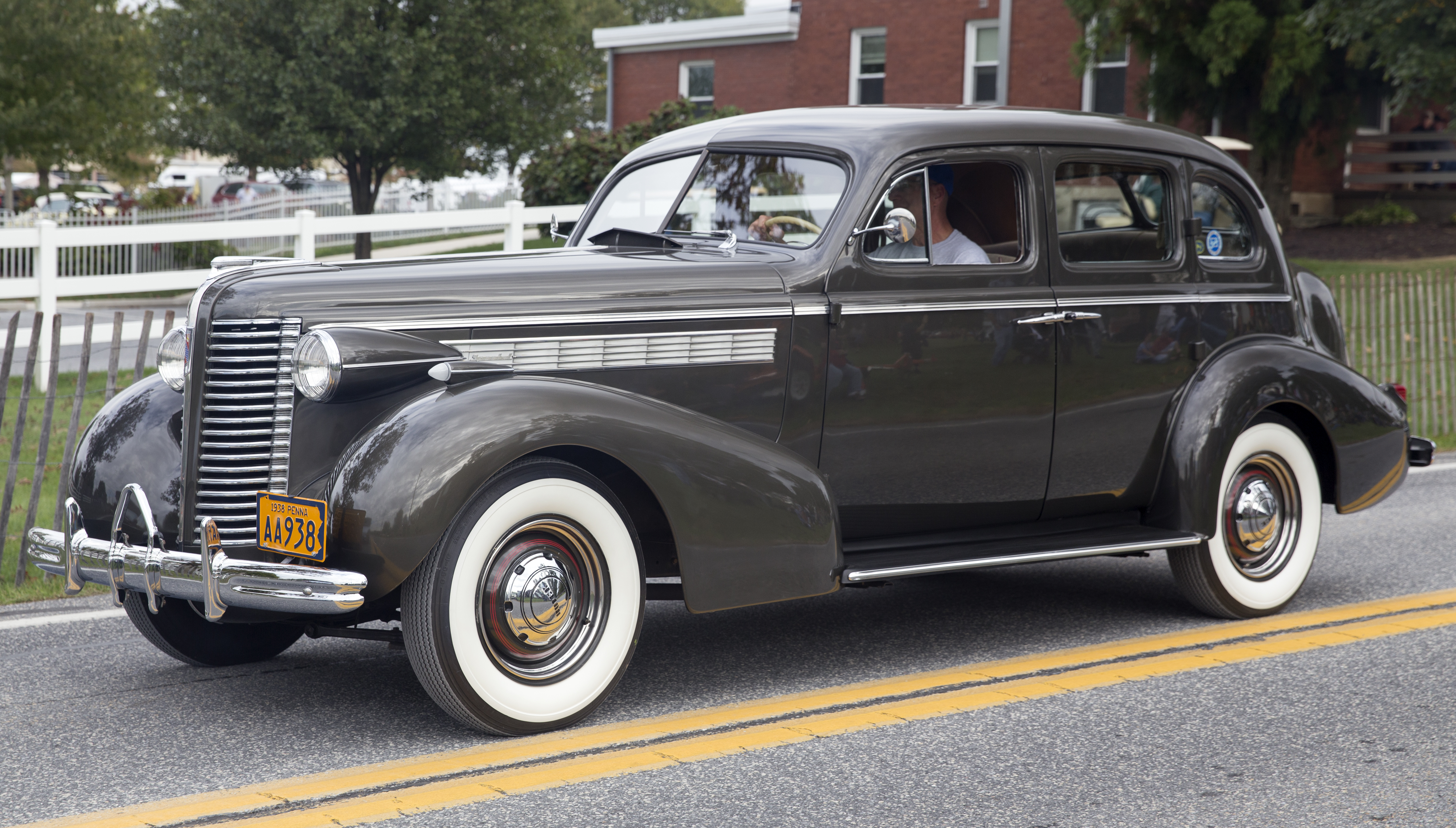
1938 Buick Special Series 40 Touring Sedan Model 41

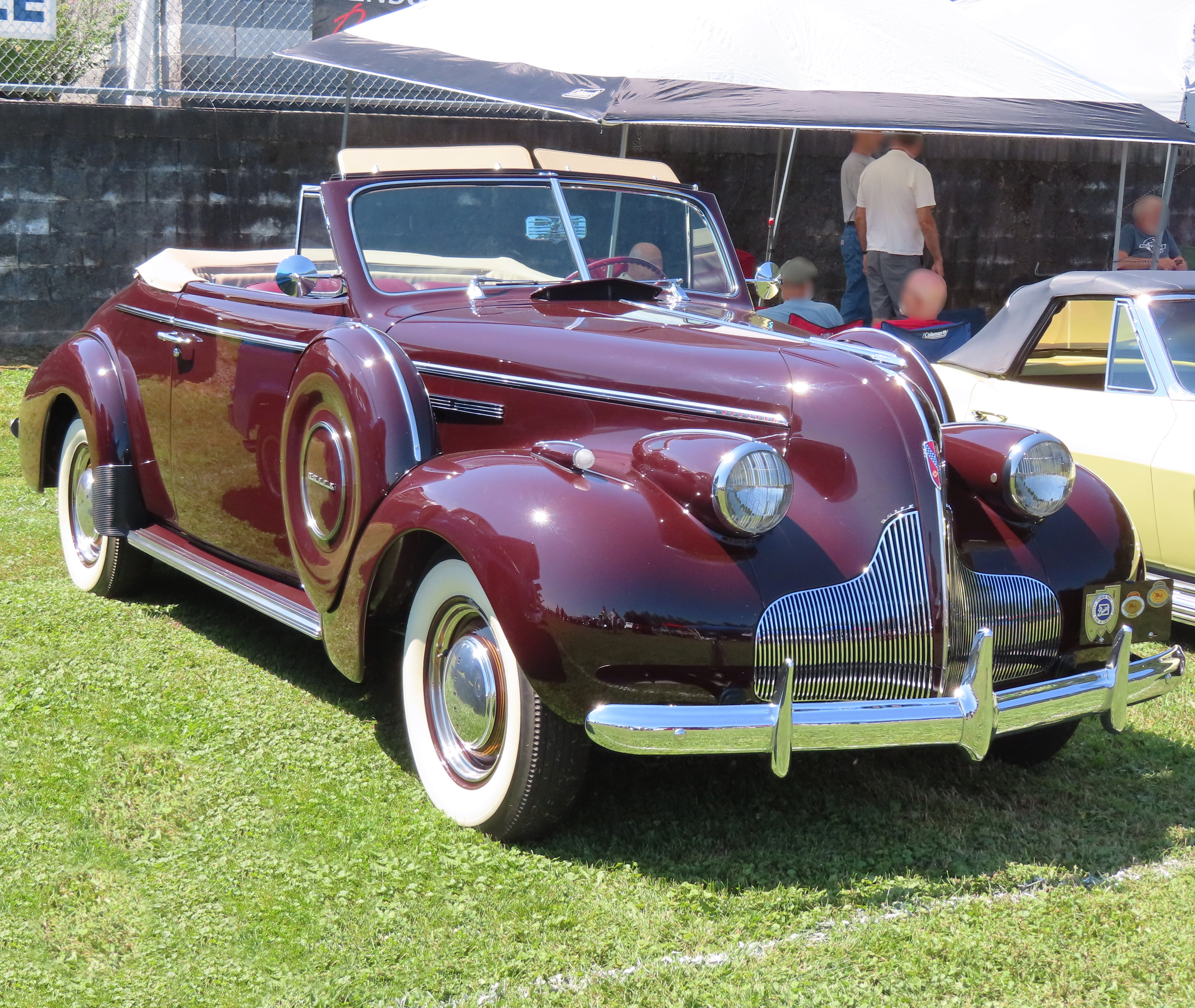
1939 Buick Special Series 40 Convertible Coupe Model 46-C

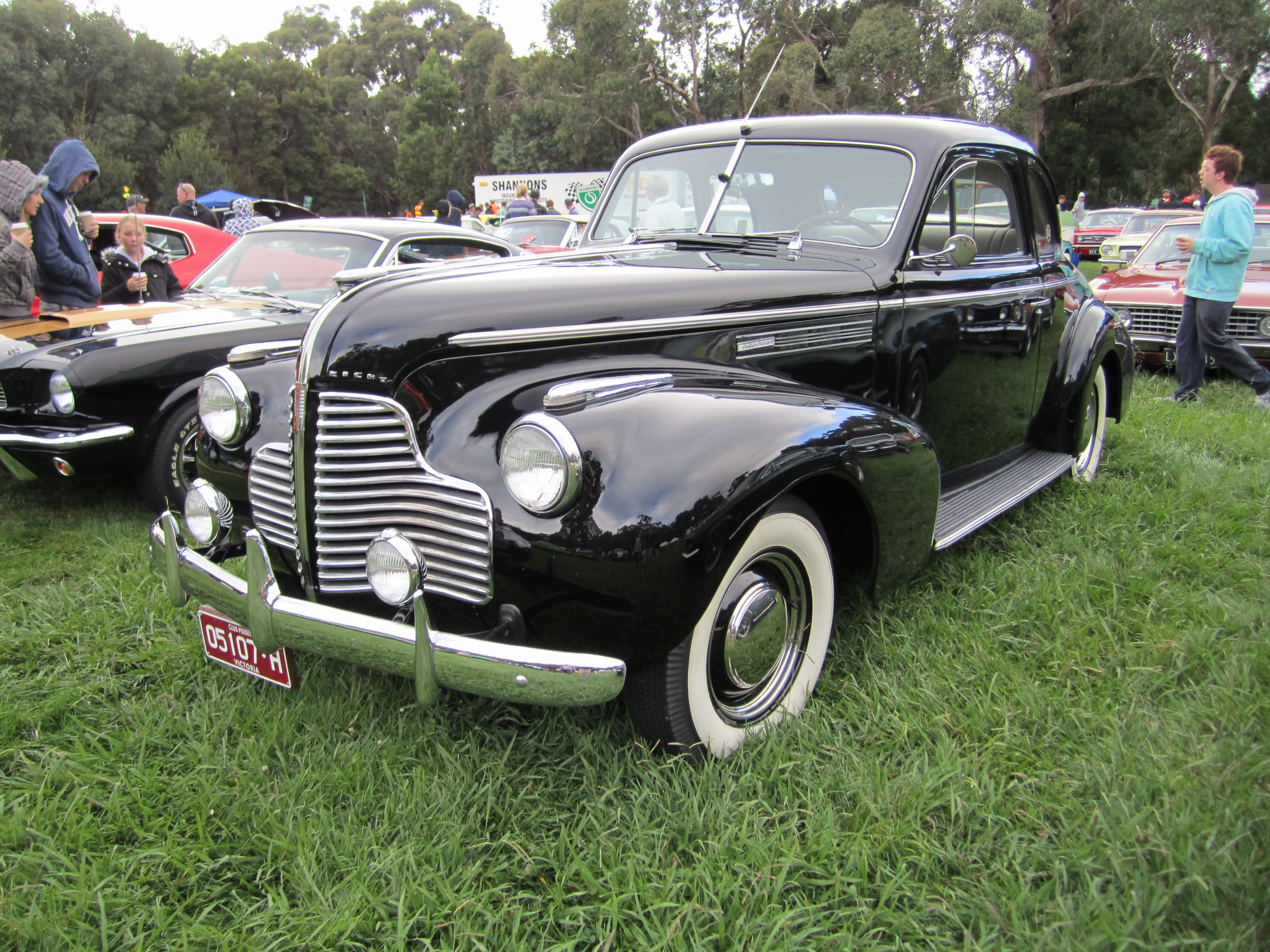
1940 Buick Special Series 40 Sport Coupe Model 465

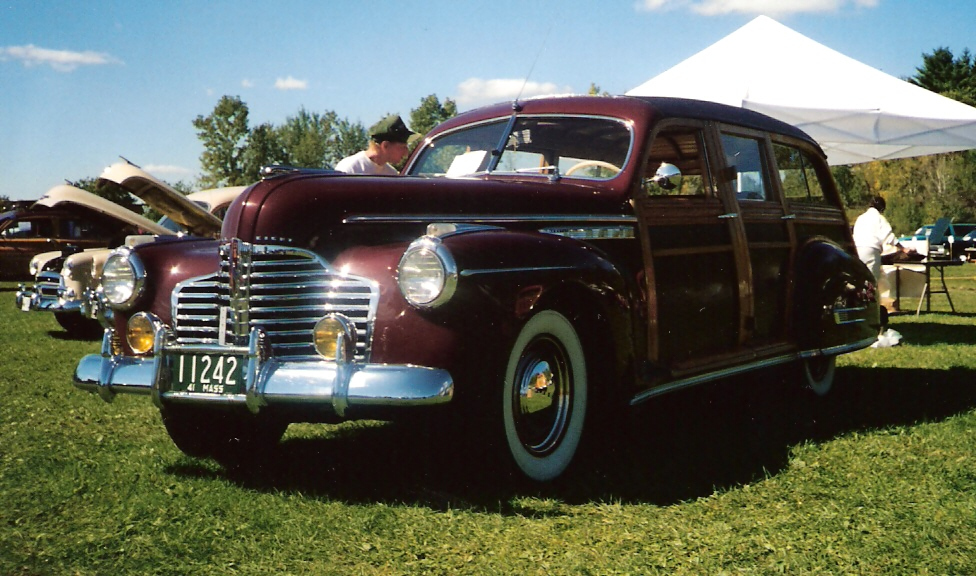
1941 Buick Special Series 40-B Estate Wagon Model 49

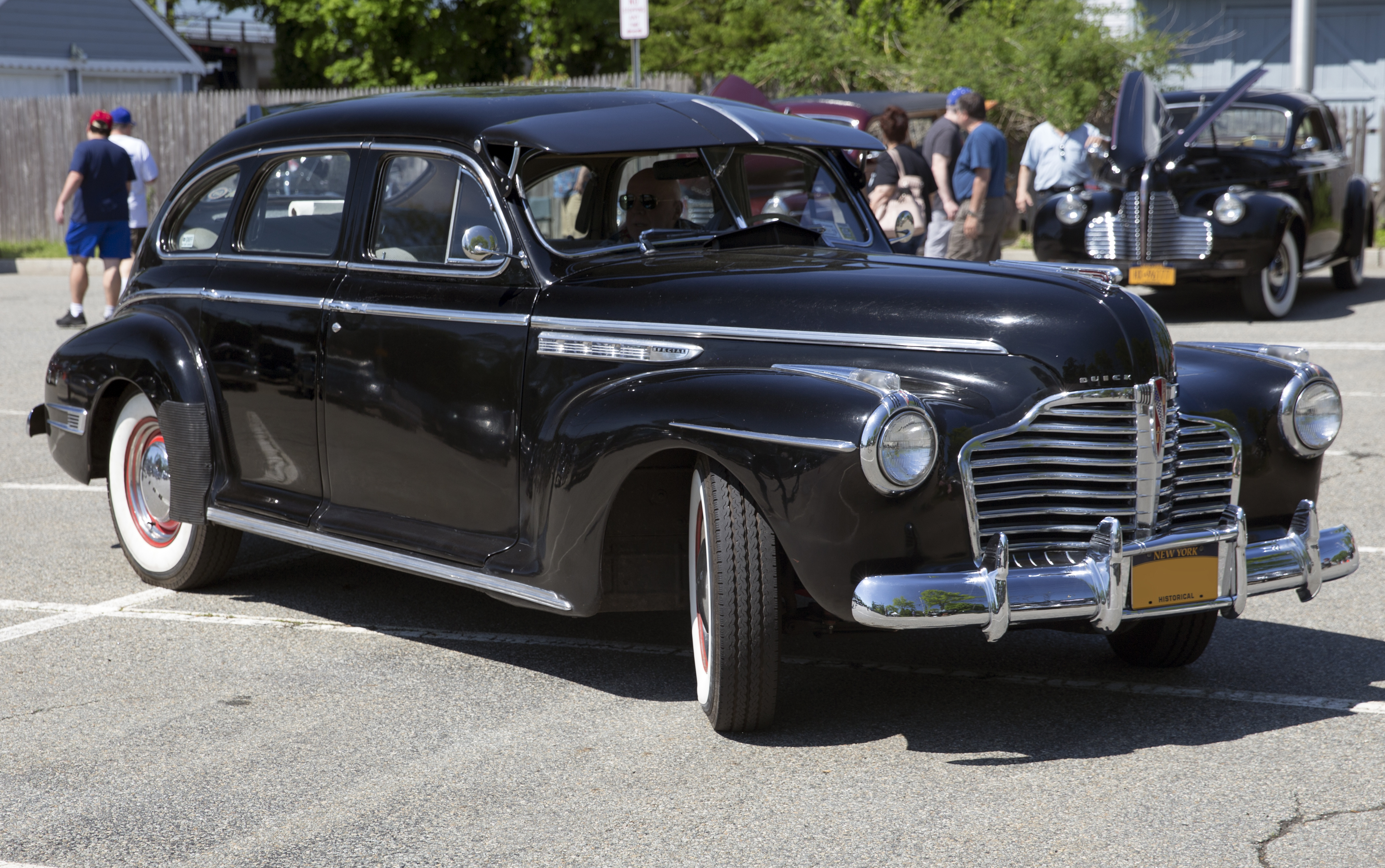
1941 Buick Special Series 40-B Touring Sedan Model 41

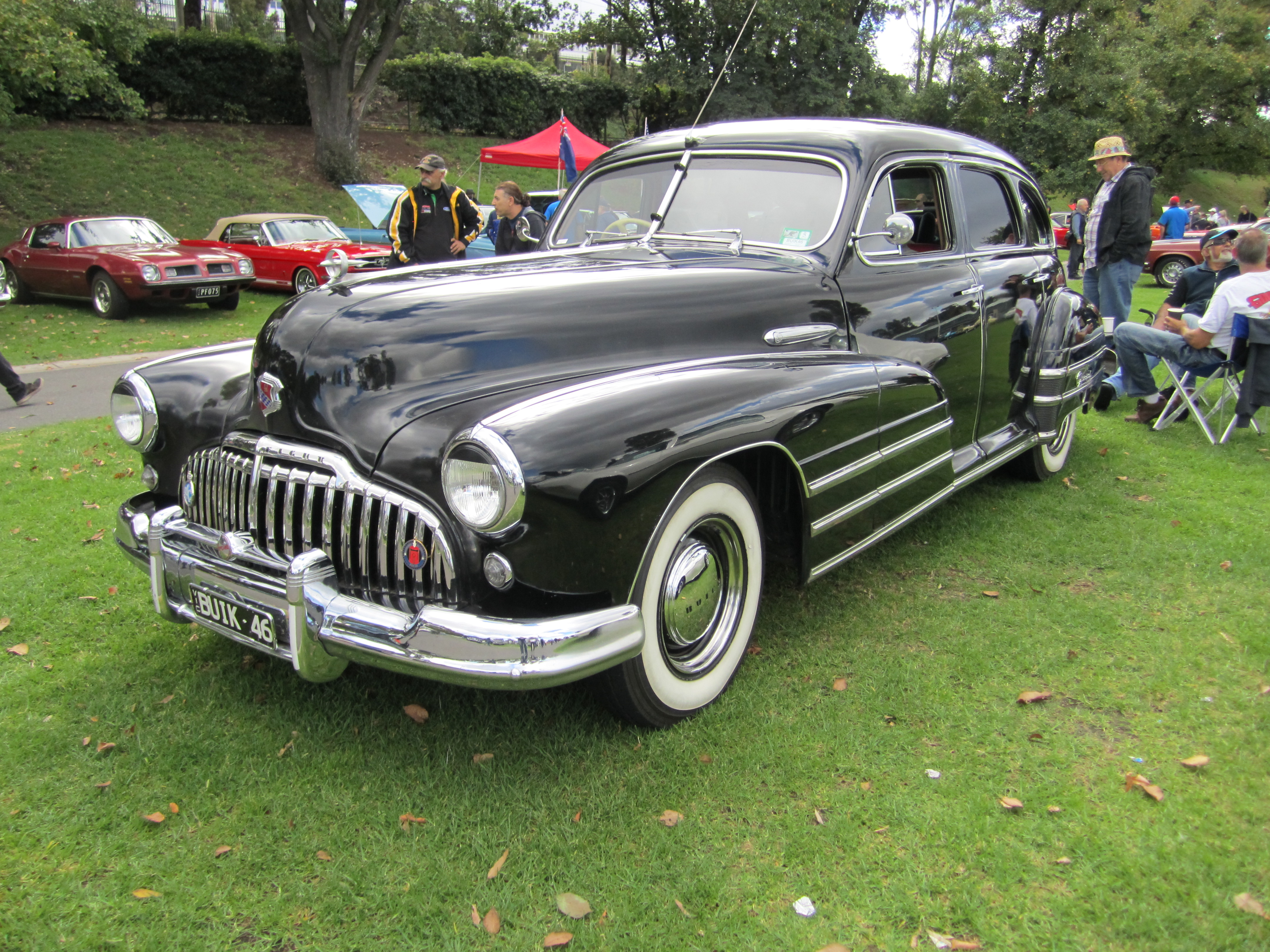
1946 Buick Special Series 40 Touring Sedan

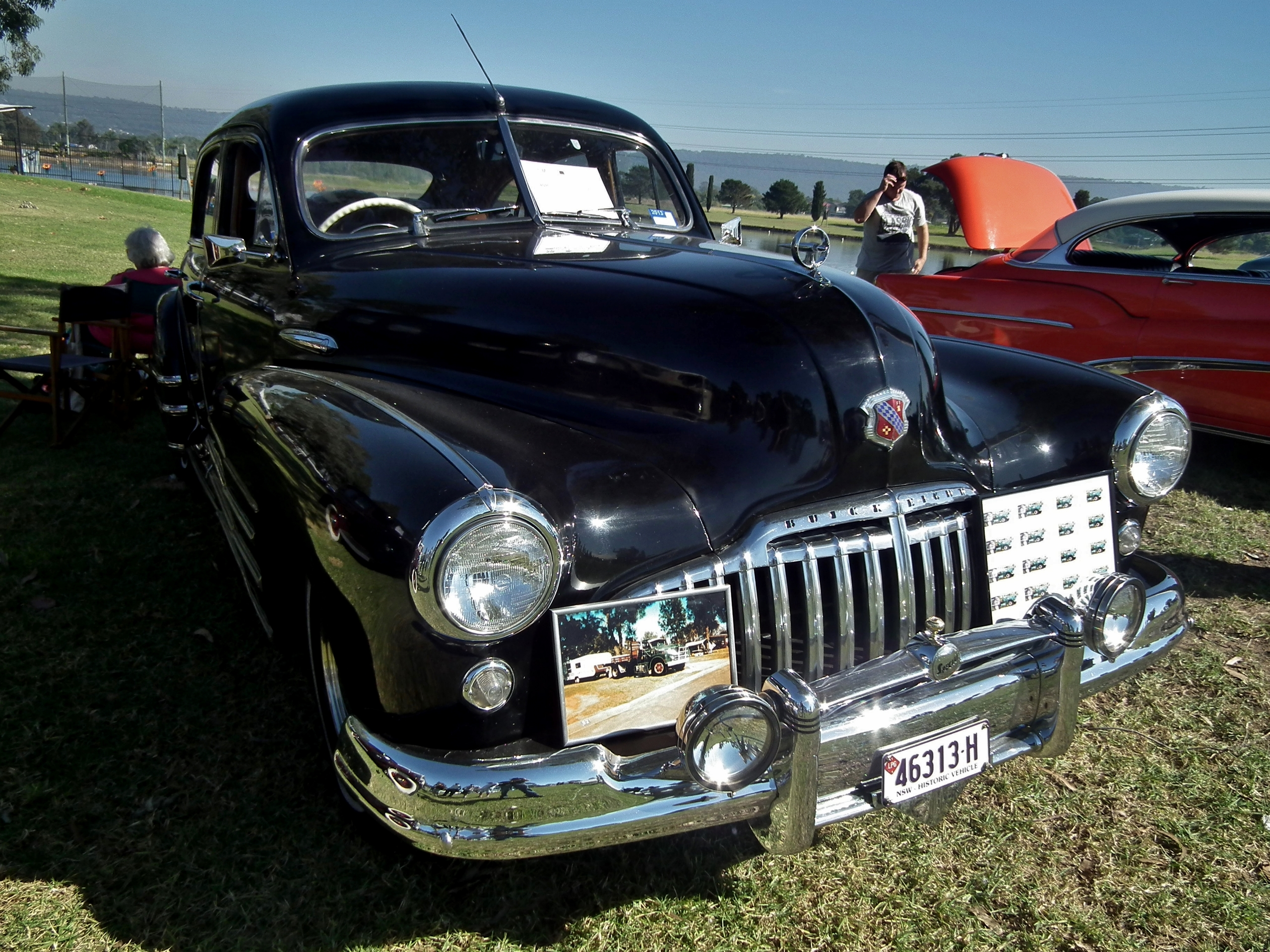
1947 Buick Special Series 40 Touring Sedan

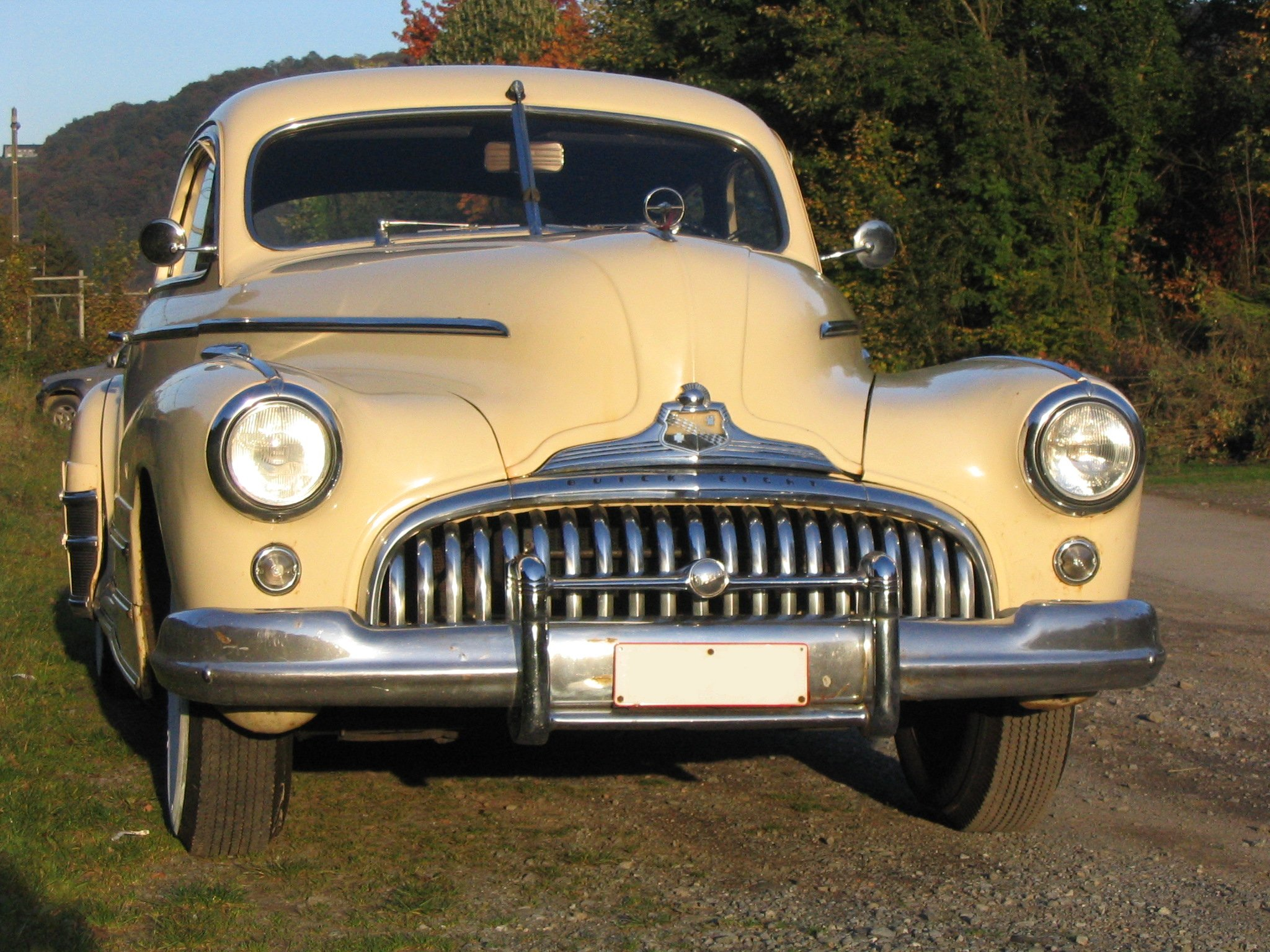
1948 Buick Special Series 40

== 1949–1958 ==
Series 40
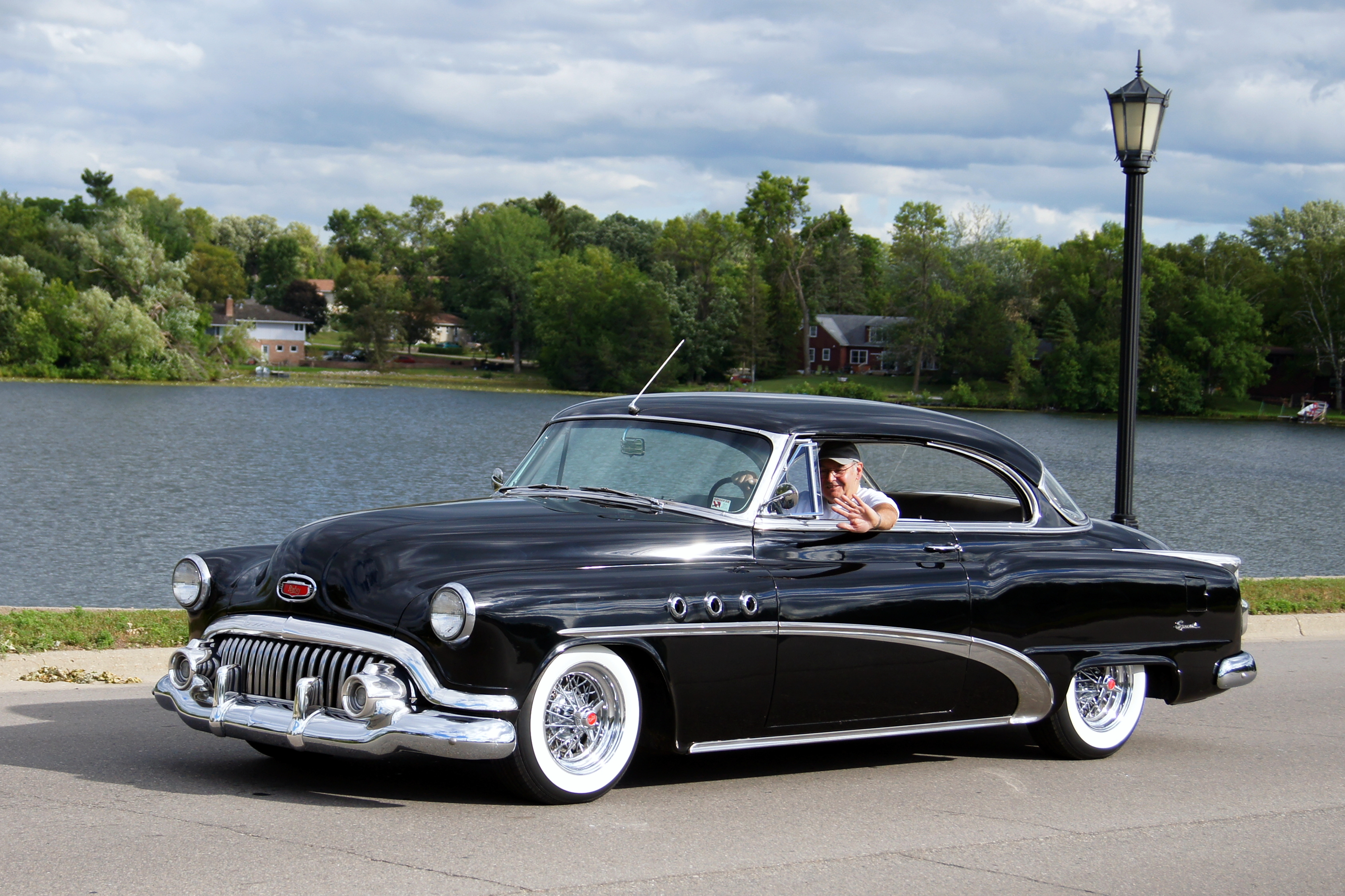
- 1952 Buick Special De Luxe 2-door Tourback Sedanette

Overview
- Model years: 1949–1958
- Assembly: (main plant); Flint, Michigan, United States, (Buick City) (branch assembly); Arlington Assembly (Texas) (1955-1958); Doraville Assembly ("Atlanta") (Georgia); Fairfax Assembly (Kansas City, Kansas); Framingham Assembly (Massachusetts); Linden Assembly (New Jersey); South Gate Assembly (California); Wilmington Assembly (Delaware)

Body and chassis
- Body style: 2-door coupe 2/4-door sedan 2-door convertible 4-door Estate station wagon (1954-1958)
- Platform: GM B platform
- Related: Oldsmobile 88; Pontiac Streamliner; Pontiac Chieftain

Powertrain
- Engine: 248 cu in (4.1 L) OHV I8; 263.3 cu in (4.3 L) Fireball OHV I8; 264 cu in (4.3 L) Fireball OHV V8; 322 cu in (5.3 L) Fireball OHV V8; 364 cu in (6.0 L) Fireball OHV V8
- Transmission: 2-speed Dynaflow automatic

Dimensions
- Wheelbase: 121.5 in (3,086 mm) (1949–1953); 122 in (3,099 mm) (1954–1958)

Halfway into the 1949 model year, the Specials received all-new bodywork to include a dramatically styled grille where nine grille bars also served as bumper guards and extended over the front bumper, and the first fully postwar design for the series. New was also the 40D-series, a better equipped version called the Special DeLuxe. The engine remained the 248 cu in (4.1 L) which had been used since 1937, but for 1951 this was replaced by the larger "Fireball" straight-eight.

The Special was available in both fastback Jetback and new notchback Tourback configurations. The Jetback was available as a 2-door Sedanet, 2-door coupe and 4-door sedan, whilst the Tourback was available only as a 4-door sedan. In 1950, overall 195,072 Jetbacks and 142,537 Tourbacks were produced, but just 72,735 Jetbacks were 4-door sedans, bit more than half of the Tourbacks. The fastback design, dating back to GM's pre-war streamliners, was quickly becoming outdated by the turn of the decade and by 1951, Special was no longer available in the Jetback style.

A two-door hardtop coupe was also new for 1951, but the unusual grille was revised with the grille bars shortened. The 1954 Specials had an all-new body and chassis, much wider and lower, and were now equipped with the all-new, more powerful "Fireball" V8 engines. In 1953 The Buick-Berle Show introduced product placement commercials on TV, and later in 1955 The Honeymooners was one of the sponsors.

Introduced in the middle of the 1955 model year the four-door Buick Special Riviera (along with the Century Riviera, the Oldsmobile 98 Holiday, and the 88 Holiday) were the first four-door pillarless hardtops ever produced. By then, the Buick Special was one of America's best selling automotive series, and is credited with helping Buick rise to #3 in sales, overtaking Chrysler's volume-seller Plymouth. For 1956 the larger 322 cu in (5.3 L) V8 engine was shared with the rest of the range, although it was replaced by the bigger, 250 hp (186 kW) 364 V8 for 1957. This year also brought all-new bodywork, as well as a four-door hardtop station wagon called the Buick Riviera Estate. The 1957 wheelbase remained 122 inches. In the June, 1957 issue of Popular Mechanics, the Special was rated with a 0-60 mph time of 11.6 seconds, fuel economy of 17.4 mpg_{‑US} (13.5 L/100 km; 20.9 mpg_{‑imp}) at 50 mph (80 km/h), and ground clearance of 6.9 in (175 mm). 1958 brought the most chrome yet and twin headlights, as the car grew longer and wider, albeit on an unchanged chassis.

1949-1957 Buick Specials had three VentiPorts on each side while more senior Buicks (with the partial exception of the Buick Super, which switched from three to four in 1955) had four. Earlier versions had a "Sweepspear" inspired character line alongside the body, while later versions had the "Sweepspear" moulding attached to the side of all models. GM renamed the Buick Special the LeSabre for the 1959 model year, taking the name from the 1951 Le Sabre concept car.

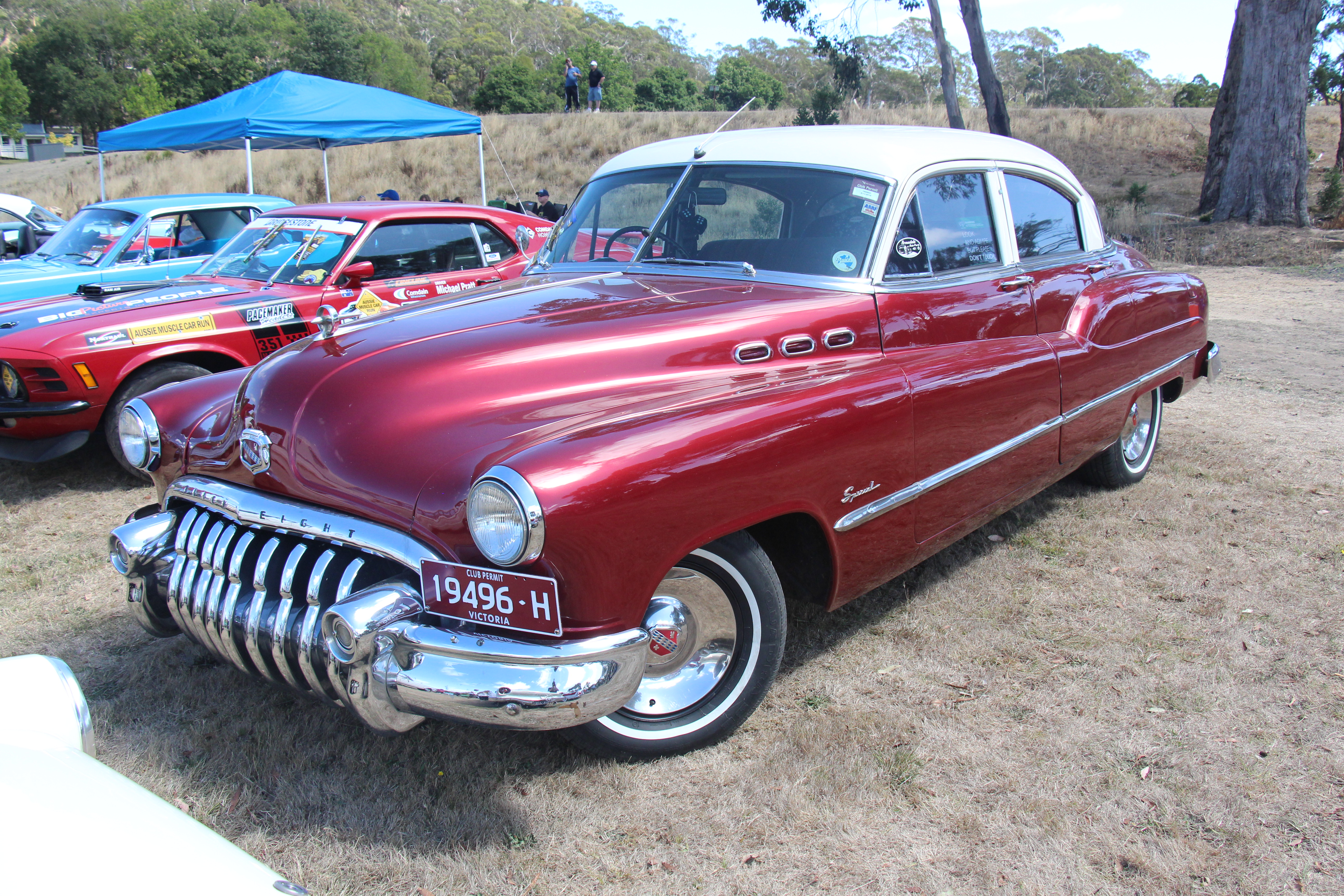
1950 Buick Special 4-Door Tourback Sedan

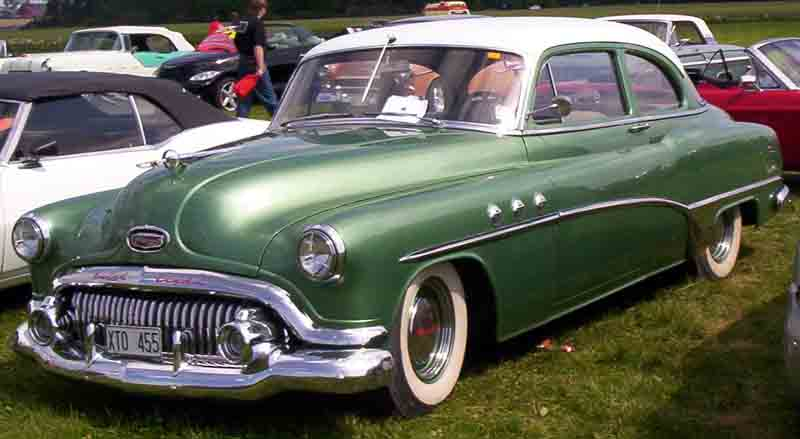
1951 Buick Special Deluxe Tourback Sedanette

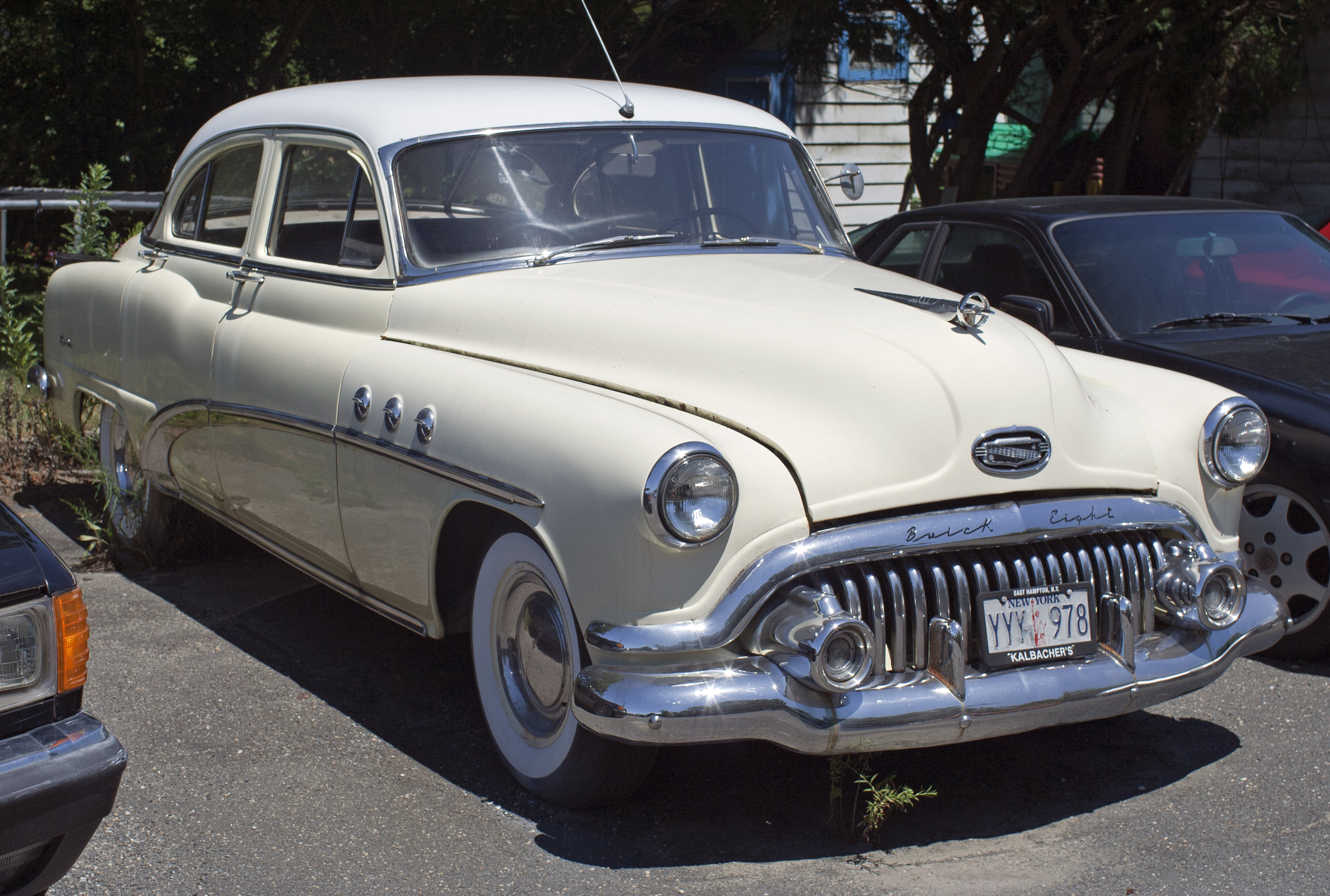
1952 Buick Special DeLuxe Tourback Sedan

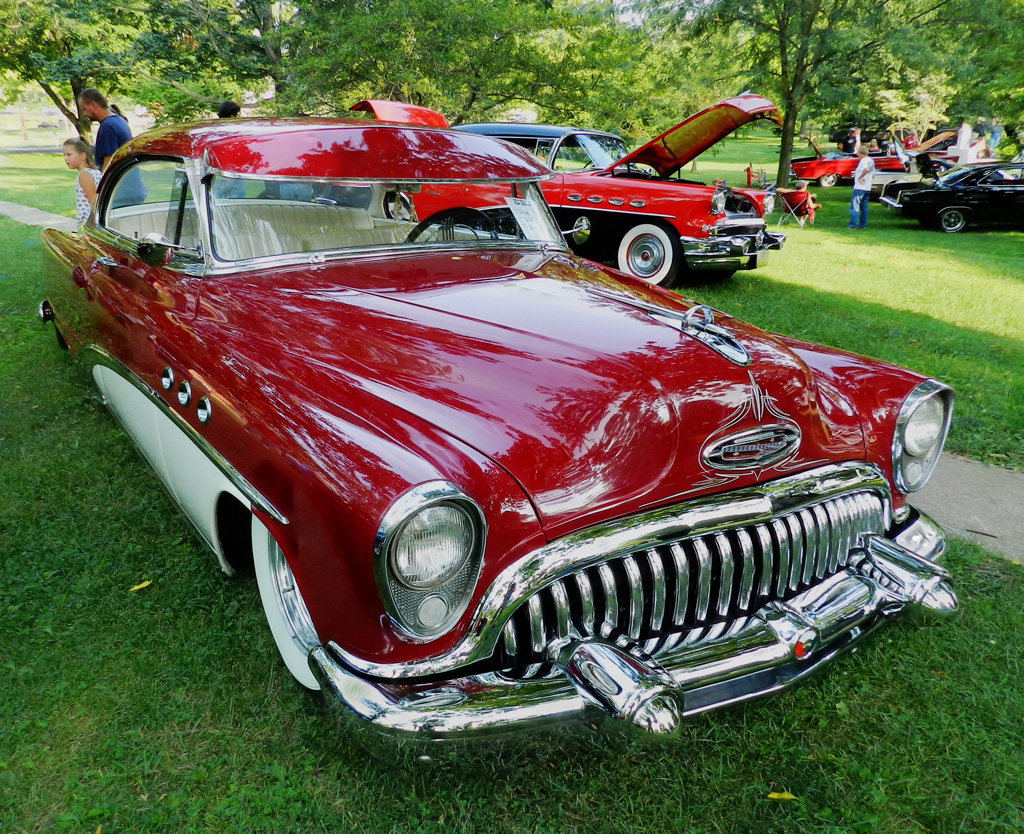
1953 Buick Special Riviera coupe

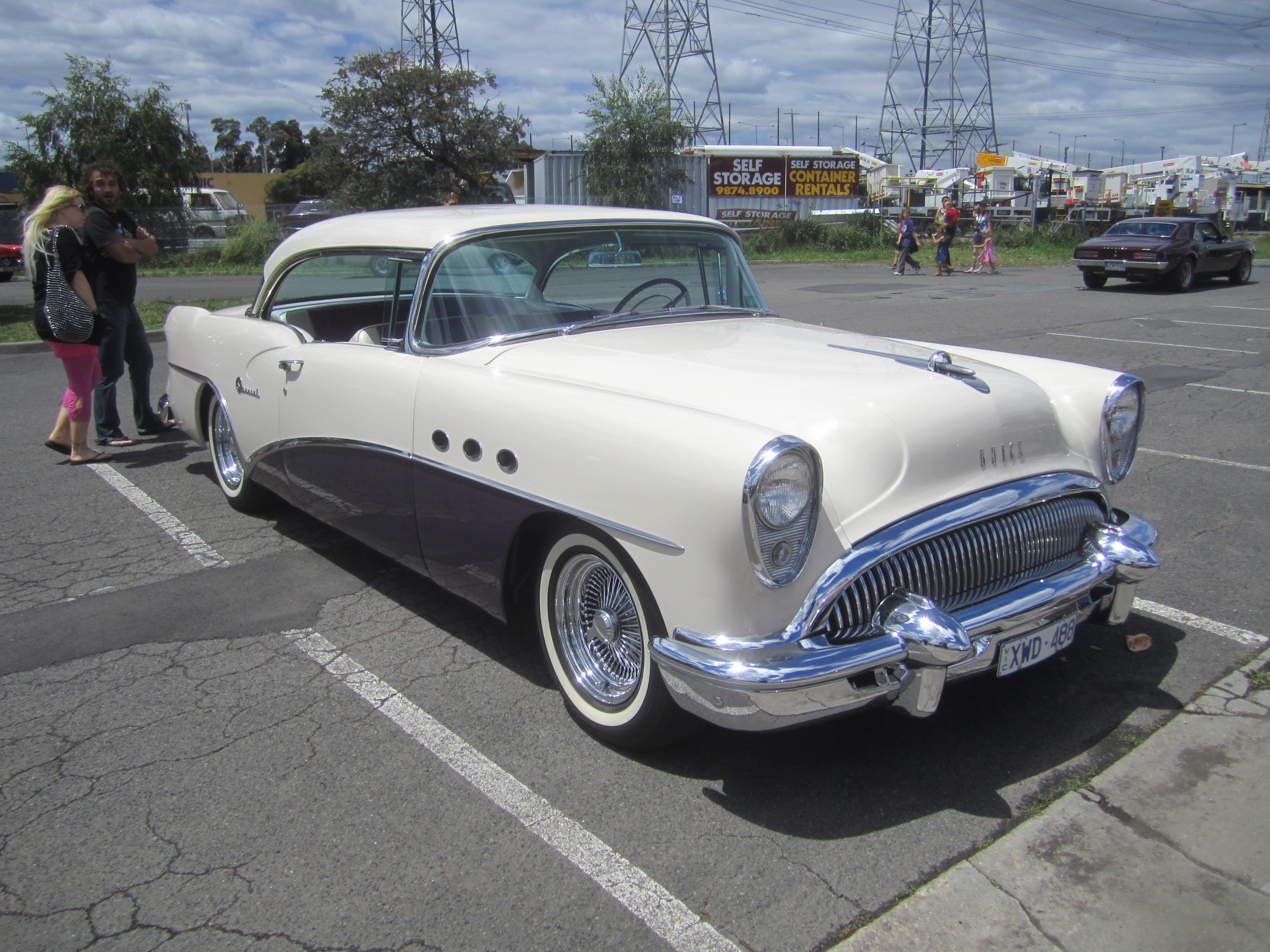
1954 Buick Special Riviera coupe

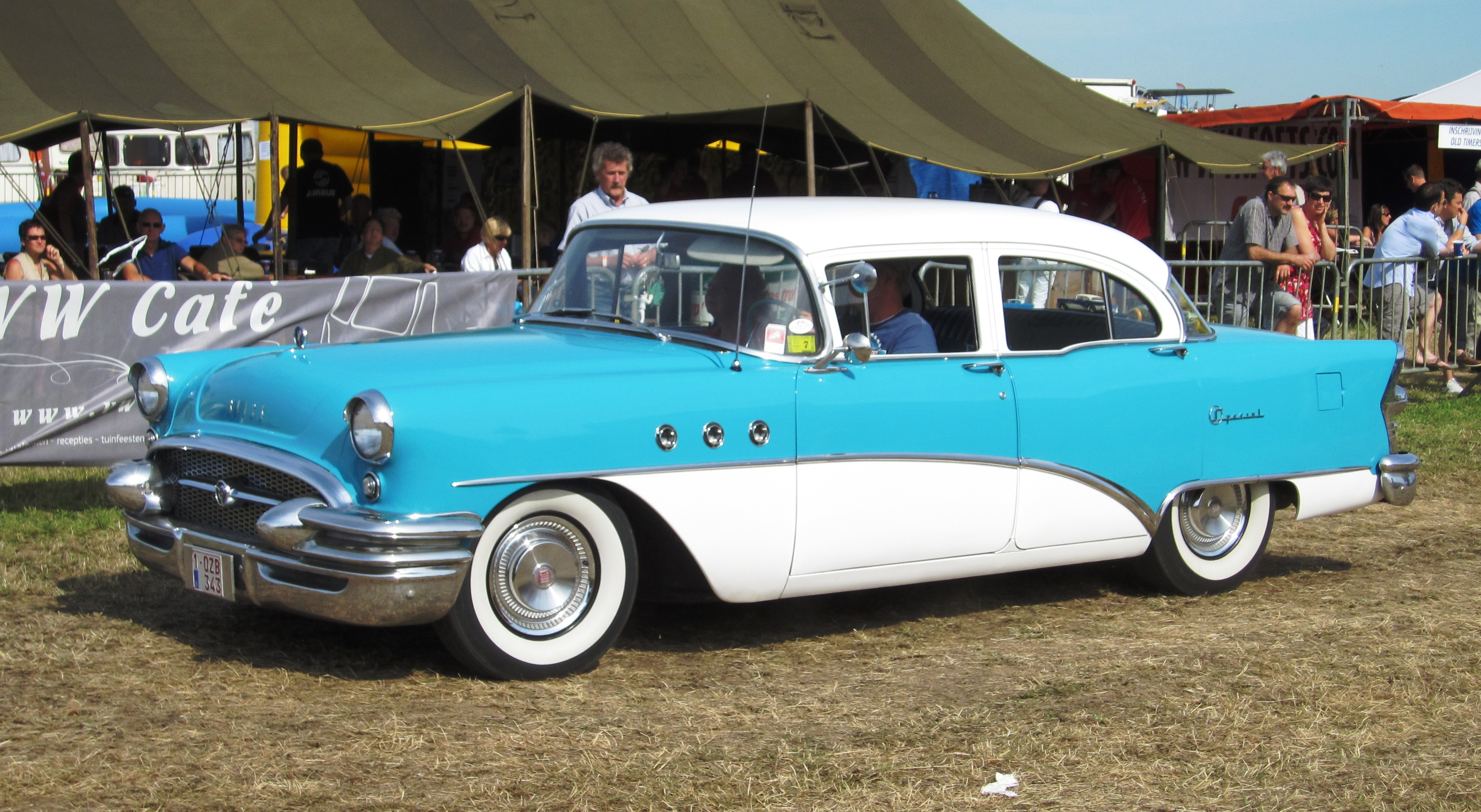
1955 Buick Special 4-Door Sedan

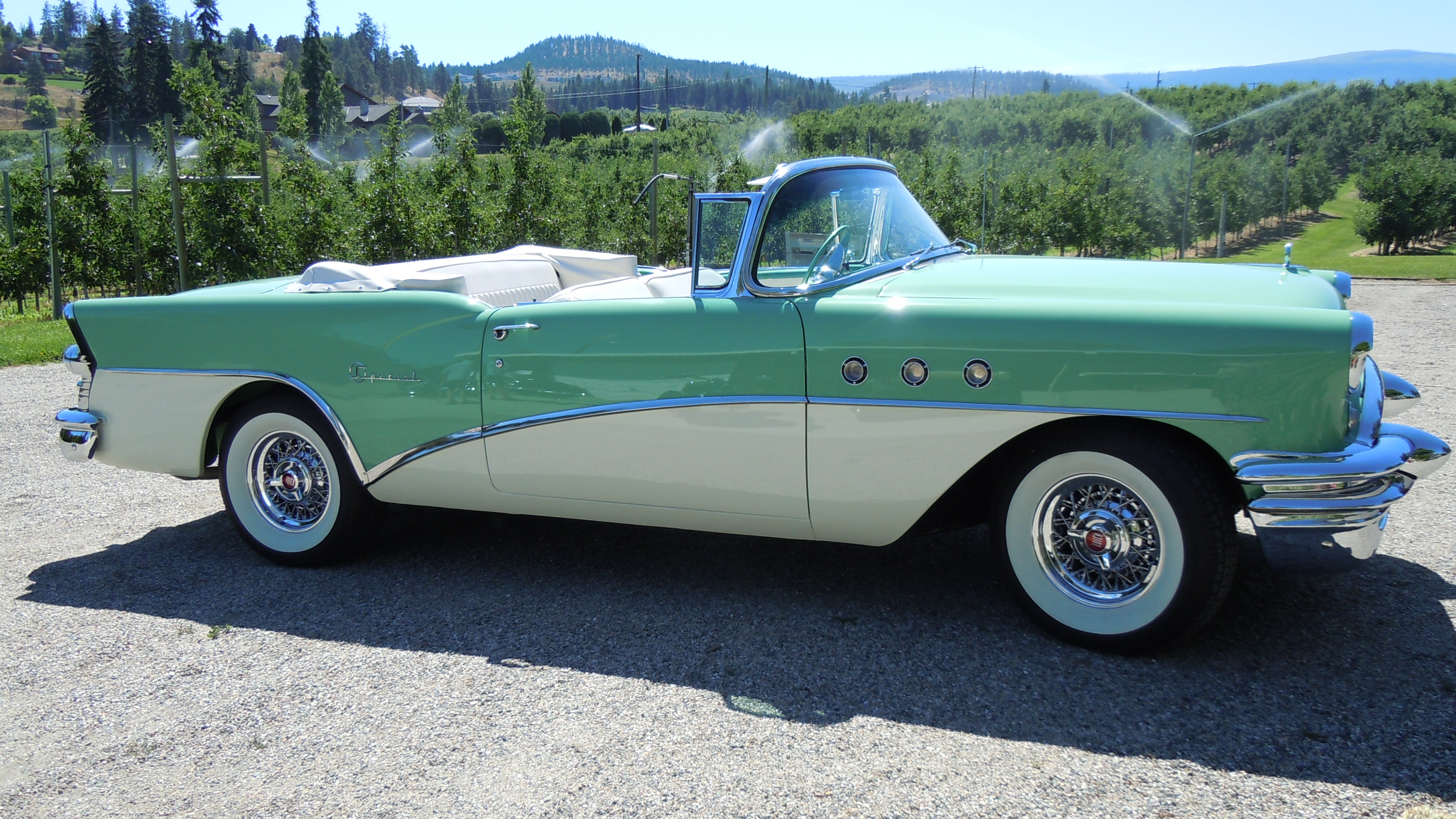
1955 Buick Special Convertible

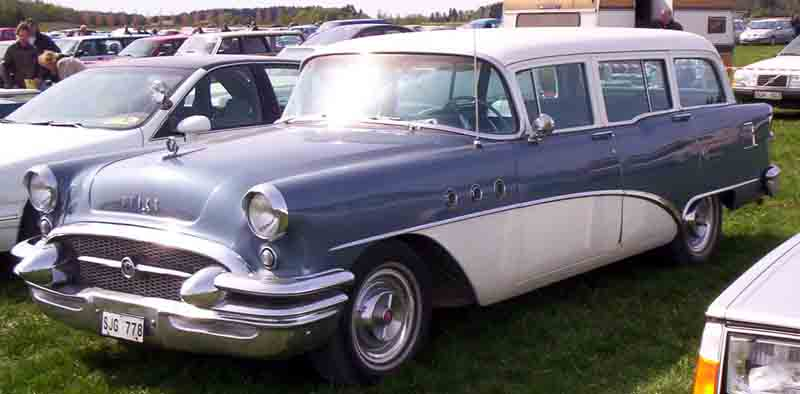
1955 Buick Special Estate Wagon

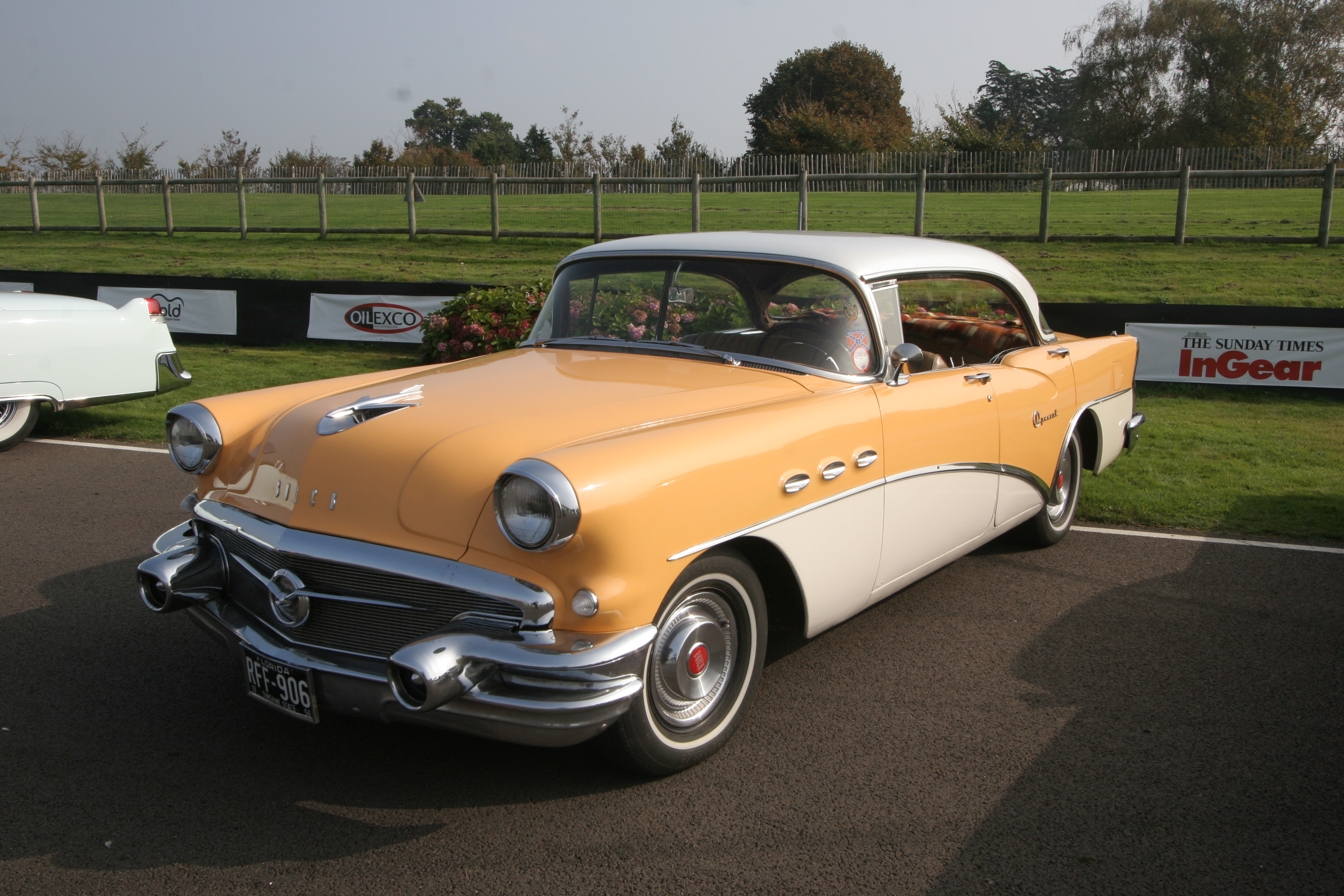
1956 Buick Special 4-Door Riviera

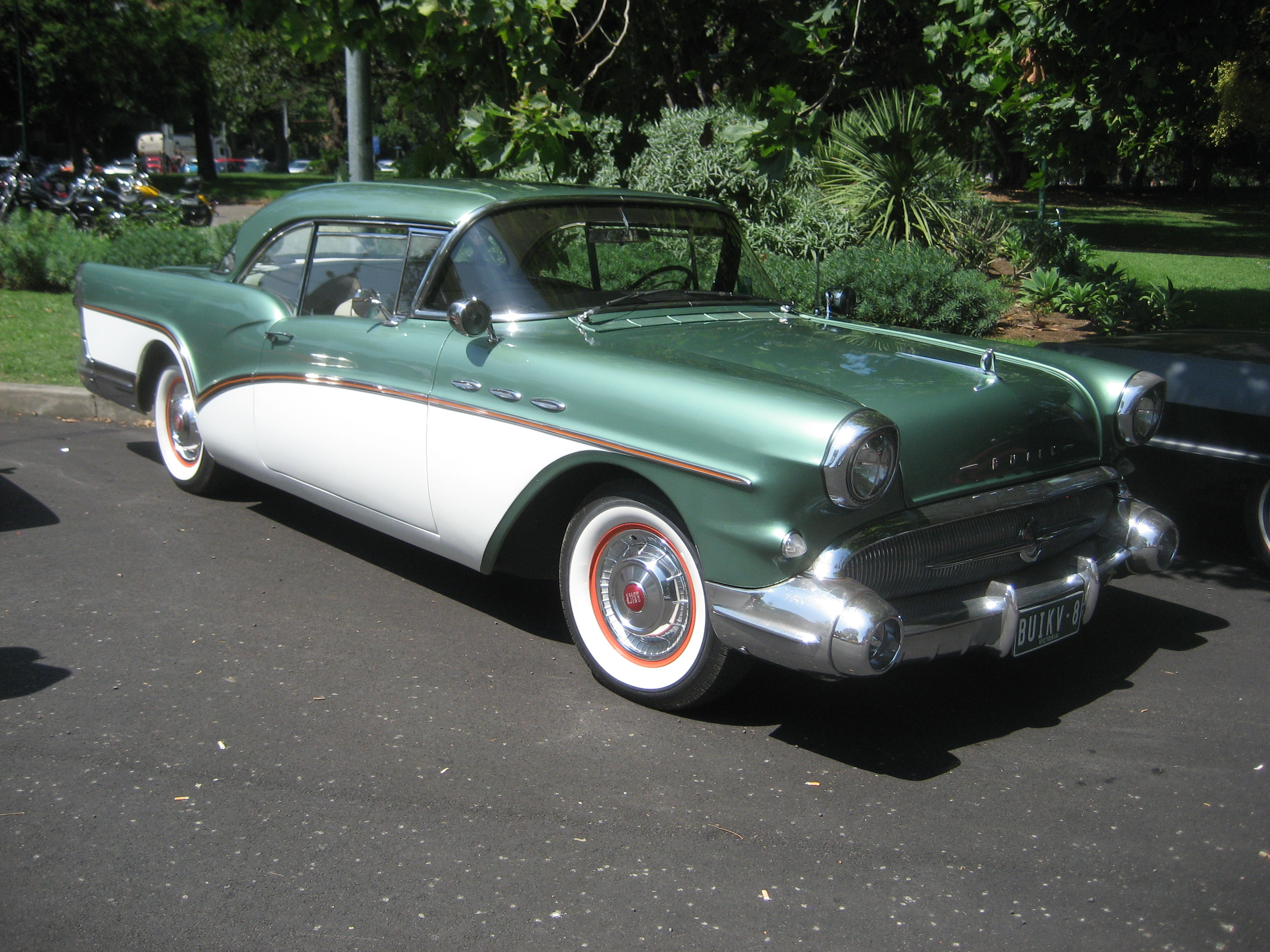
1957 Buick Special 2-Door Riviera

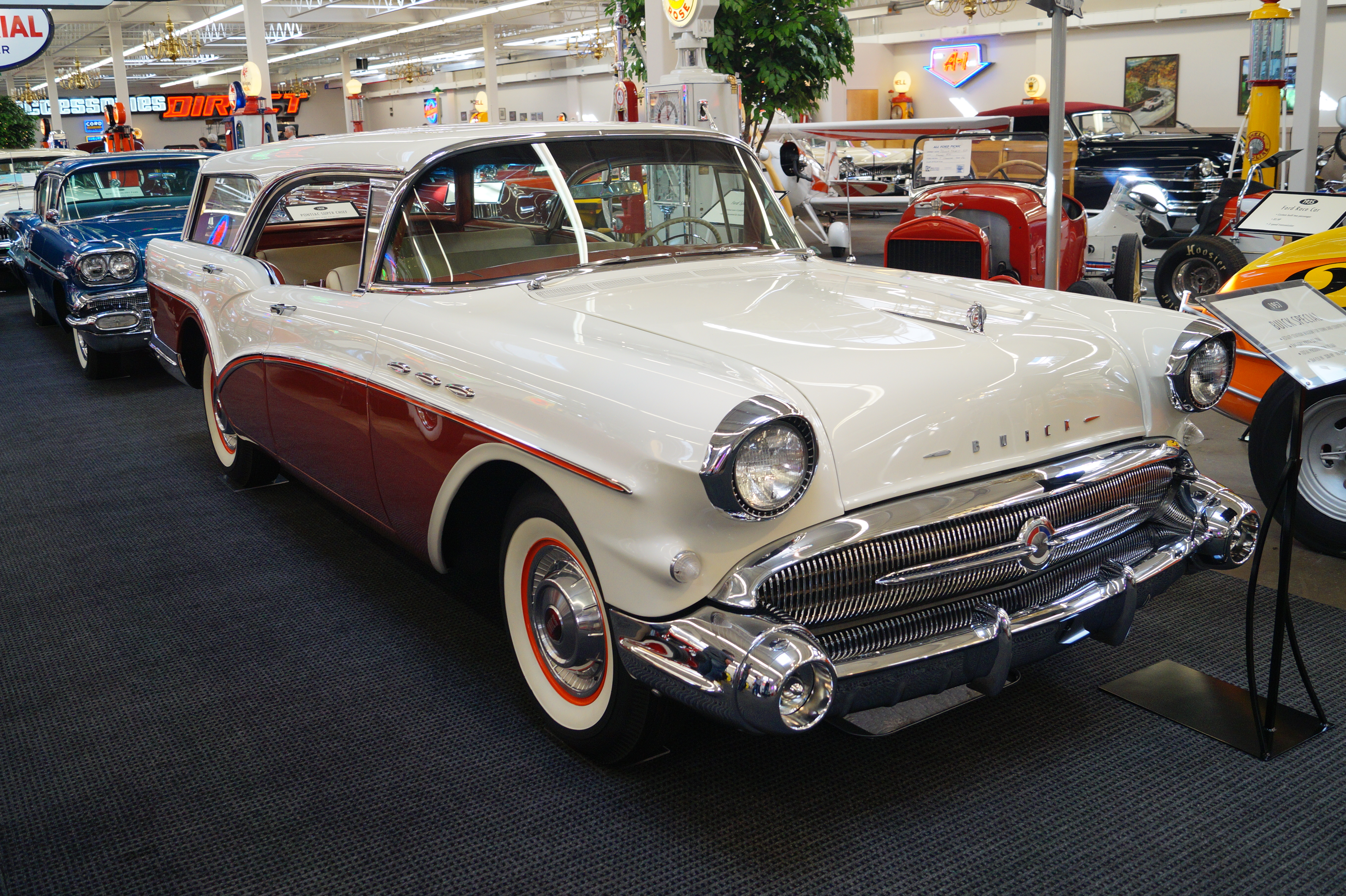
1957 Buick Special Riviera Estate hardtop station wagon

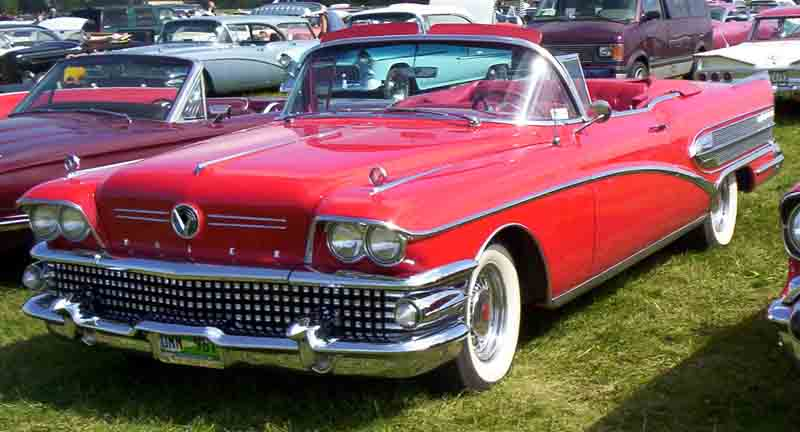
1958 Buick Special convertible

== 1961–1963 ==
Series 4000/4100/4300 (Special/Special Deluxe/Skylark)
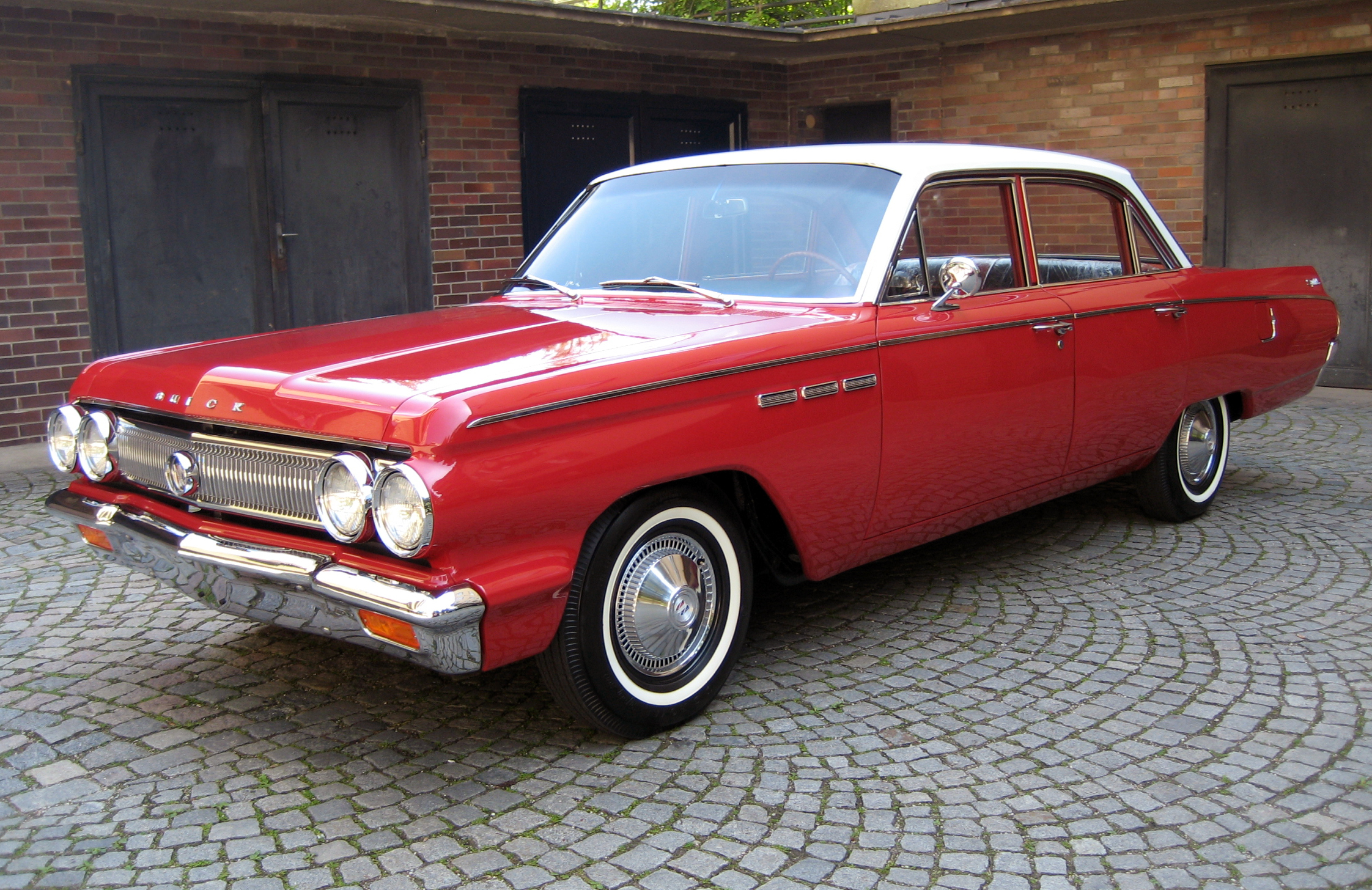
- 1963 Buick Special Deluxe 4-Door Sedan

Overview
- Production: 1961–1963
- Assembly: (main plant); Flint, Michigan, United States, (Buick City) (branch assembly); Kansas City, Kansas, United States, (Fairfax Assembly); South Gate, California, United States, (South Gate Assembly)

Body and chassis
- Body style: 2-door coupe 2/4-door sedan 4-door station wagon 2-door convertible
- Platform: Y-body

Powertrain
- Engine: 198 cu in (3.2 L) Fireball V6; 215 cu in (3.5 L) Buick 215 V8
- Transmission: 3/4-speed manual 2-speed Dual Path automatic

Dimensions
- Wheelbase: 112 in (2,845 mm)
- Length: 193 in (4,900 mm)
- Width: 70.2 in (1,783 mm)

In 1961, the car returned after a short absence of two years, but this time it was on the brand new unibody compact GM Y platform. The Special was powered by a 155 hp (116 kW) innovative aluminum-block 215 in³ V8, and had Dual Path transmission and power steering. In mid-year a Skylark option was released with special trim, optional bucket seats and a four-barrel version of the 215 that made 185 hp (138 kW).

In 1962, the Special was the first American car to use a V6 engine in volume production; it earned Motor Trend's Car of the Year for 1962. This 198 cid Fireball was engineered down from the 215 and used many of the same design parameters, but was cast in iron. Output was 135 hp (gross) at 4600 rpm and 205 lb⋅ft (278 N⋅m) at 2400 rpm. In their test that year, Road & Track was impressed with Buick's "practical" new V6, saying it "sounds and performs exactly like the aluminum V8 in most respects." In 1963, the Special's body was restyled. Mechanically, however, the car was identical to the 1962 model. There was also some minor interior restyling, particularly to the dash and instrument cluster. The 1963 Special was available as a 2-door pillared hardtop coupe, a four dour sedan, a convertible, and a station wagon. Engine choices were a standard 198 cu in (3.2 L) V6 with a twin-barrel carburetor and optional 215 cu in (3.5 L) V8 with 155 hp (116 kW) (two-barrel) or more powerful four-barrel (190 hp (140 kW) in 1962, 200 hp (150 kW) in 1963). Transmission choices were a three speed column shift manual transmission, a floor shift Borg-Warner T-10 four-speed manual, or a two-speed Turbine Drive automatic. The two speed "Dual Path Turbine Drive" automatic was a Buick design and shared no common parts with the better known Chevrolet Power-Glide transmission.

The 1962 model sold 153,763, including 42,973 Skylarks.

The 1963 body was only produced for one year; it sold 148,750 copies, including 42,321 Skylarks. The entire car was redesigned for 1964. After that, the 215 found its way into the Rover P6 3500S in 1968, but was never sold in North America in any great numbers. It was also employed in other British cars, including the Morgan Plus 8, MG MGB GTV8, Land Rover, and Triumph TR8, as well as retrofits into MGAs and MGBs. The engine had really earned its stripes as being the sole engine powering the Range Rover for a couple decades and eventually finding its way into the original Series/Defender Land Rover; and several other Land Rover Models including the Discovery and the Forward Control.

The Skylark became a separate series for 1962.

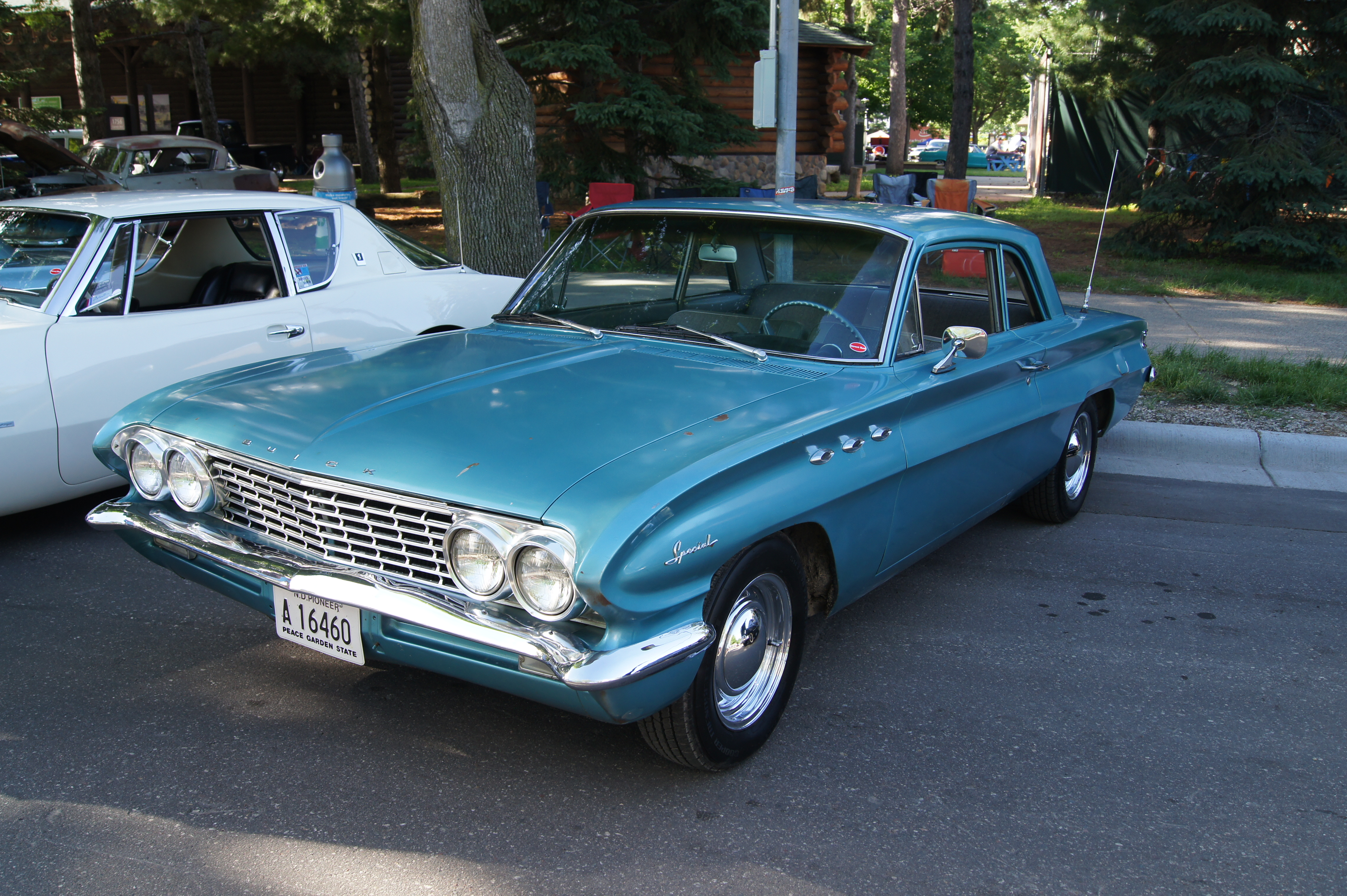
1961 Buick Special 2-door sedan

1962 Buick Special Convertible

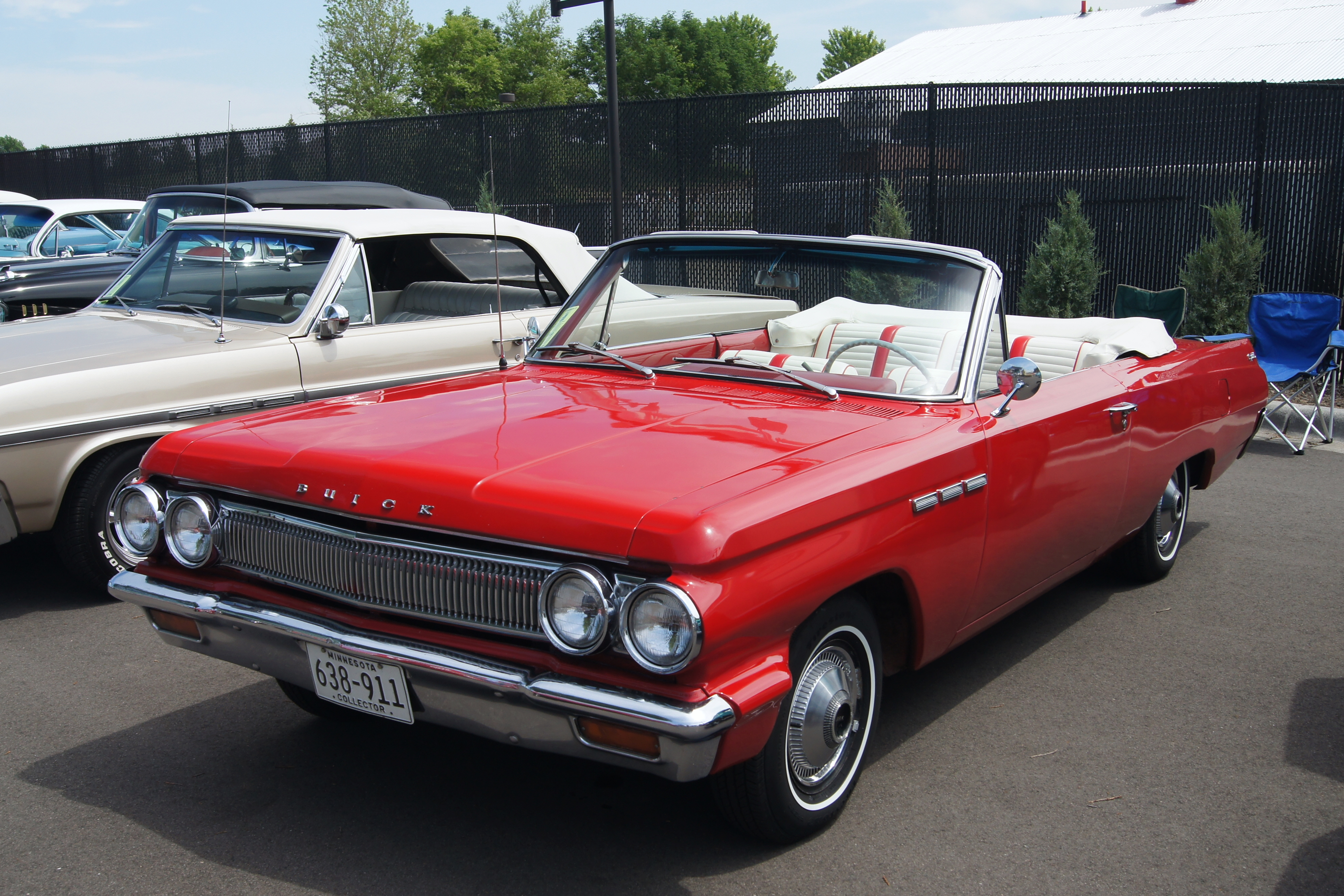
1963 Buick Special convertible

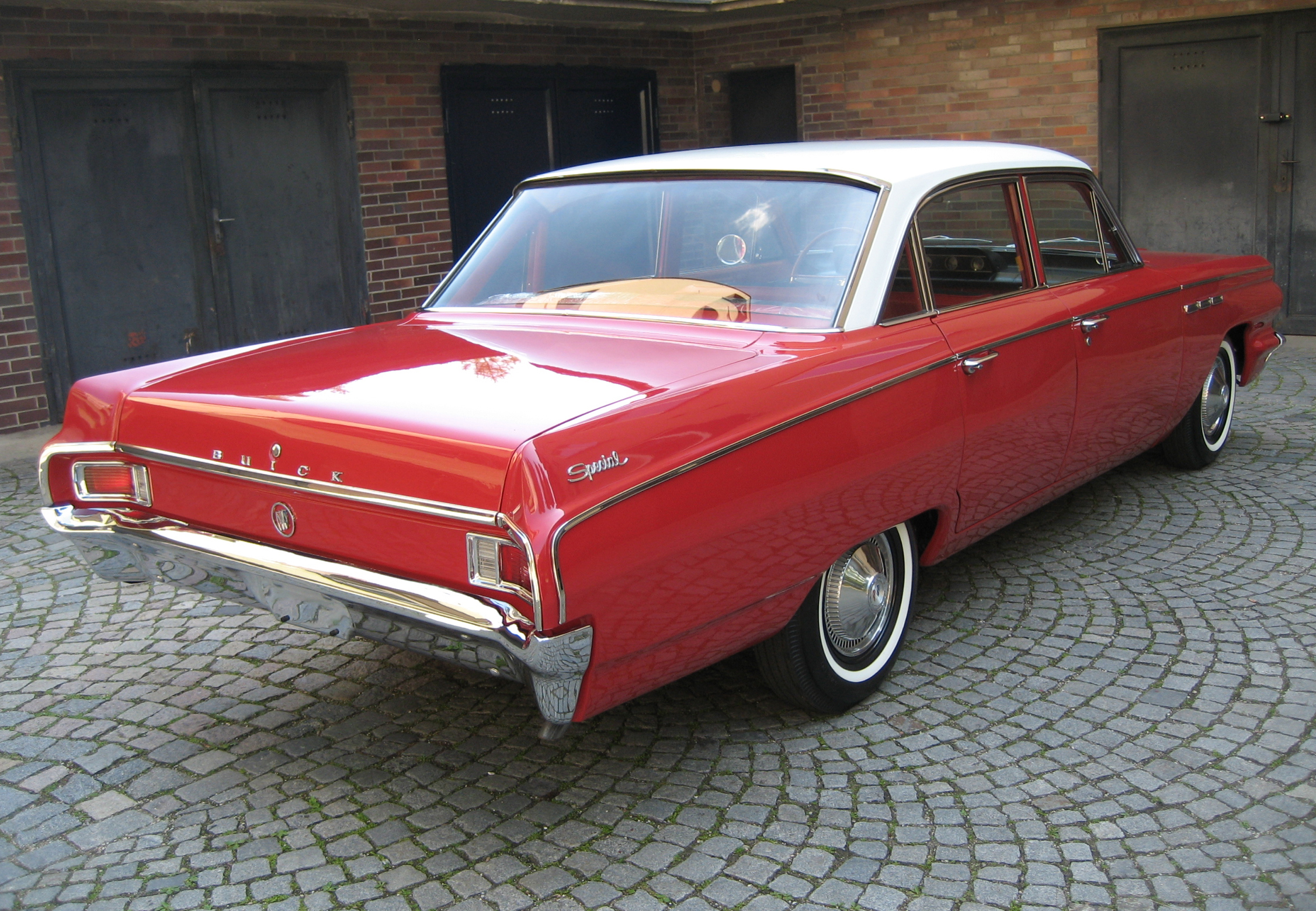
1963 Buick Special Deluxe 4-door sedan with factory 4-speed manual transmission

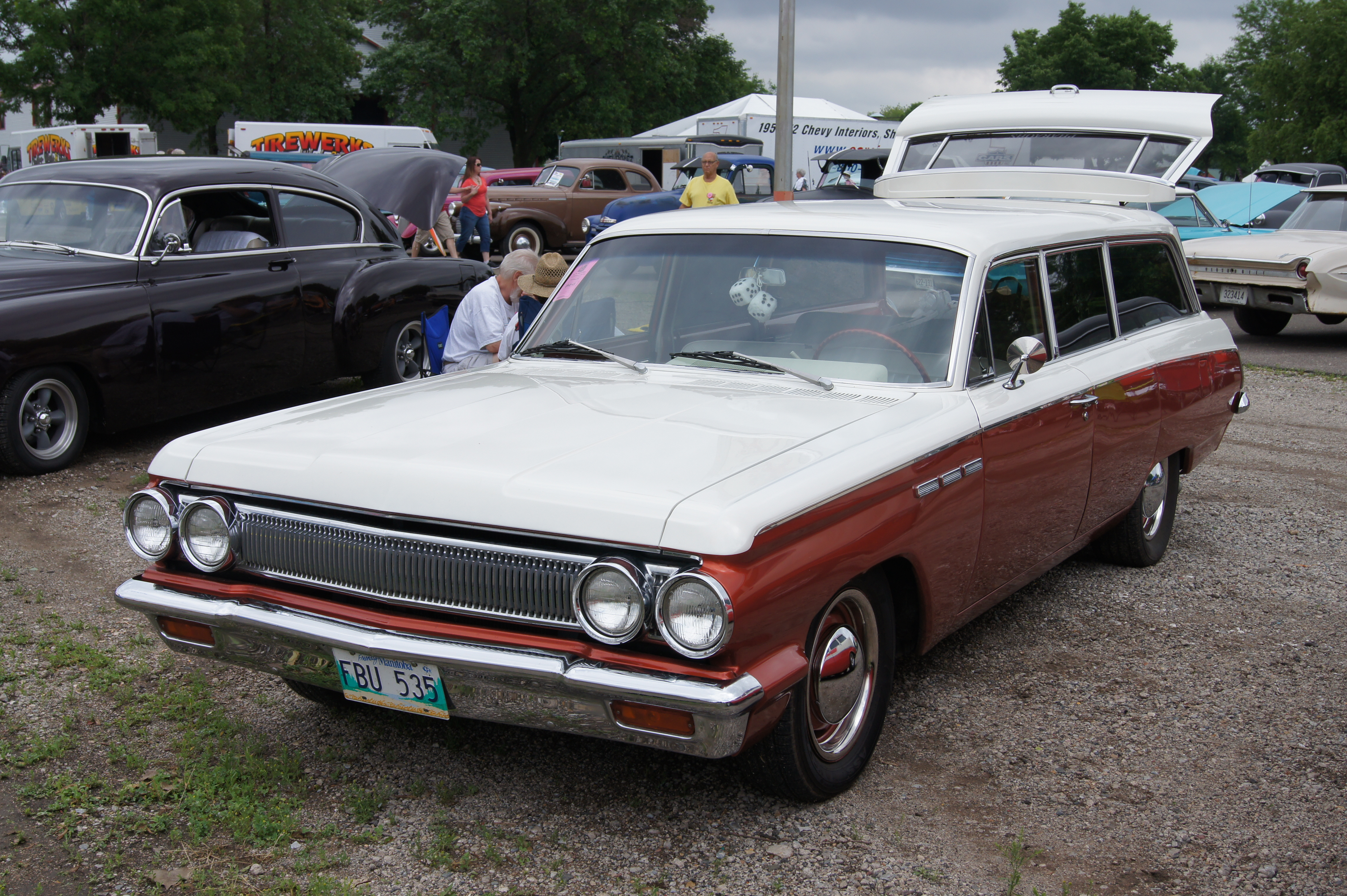
1963 Buick Special Deluxe station wagon

== 1964–1967 ==
Series 4000/4100/4300
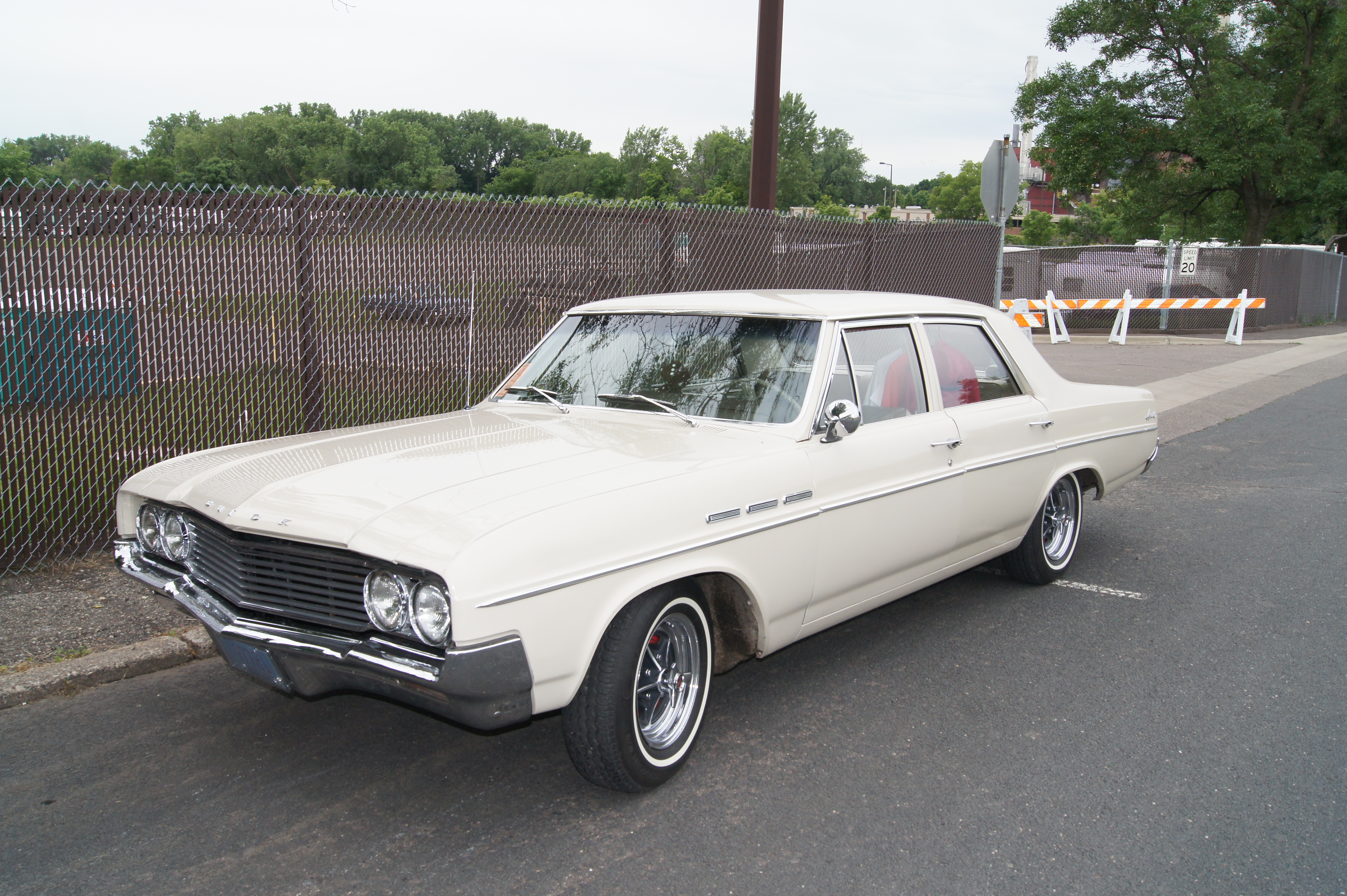
- 1964 Buick Special

Overview
- Production: 1964–1967
- Model years: 1964-1967
- Assembly: (main plant); Flint, Michigan, United States, (Buick City) (branch assembly); Baltimore, Maryland, United States (Baltimore Assembly); Fremont, California, United States (Fremont Assembly); Leeds, Kansas City, Missouri, United States (Leeds Assembly)

Body and chassis
- Body style: 2-door hardtop coupe 2-door coupe 2-door convertible 4-door Sport Wagon; 4-door sedan
- Platform: A-body
- Related: Chevrolet Chevelle; Oldsmobile Cutlass; Pontiac LeMans; Buick Skylark

Powertrain
- Engine: 225 cu in (3.7 L) V6; 300 cu in (4.9 L) V8; 340 cu in (5.6 L) V8
- Transmission: 4-speed manual 2-speed Dynaflow automatic 3-speed manual

Dimensions
- Wheelbase: 115 in (2,921 mm)
- Length: 203.4 in (5,166 mm) (coupe, sedan, convertible); 203.2 in (5,161 mm) (station wagon)
- Width: 73.6 in (1,869 mm)

The Special, along with the upscale Skylark, were redesigned for the 1964 model year with separate body-on-frame construction—renamed the A-body—and marketed as an intermediate-sized car. The Skylark was expanded to a full top-line series that now included two- and four-door sedans, two-door hardtop coupe and convertible, along with a station wagon. The other series models included the base Special and the slightly fancier Special Deluxe, in a more limited range of bodystyles.

Also new for 1964 were engines. The capacity of the V6 engine was increased from 198 to 225 cubic inches, while the aluminum V8 was replaced by a new cast iron-block 300 cubic inch V8 with aluminum cylinder heads. In 1965, cast iron heads replaced the problematic aluminum ones. This reliable engine, produced until 1967, was based on the aluminum V8, and many parts (such as the cylinder heads) were interchangeable.

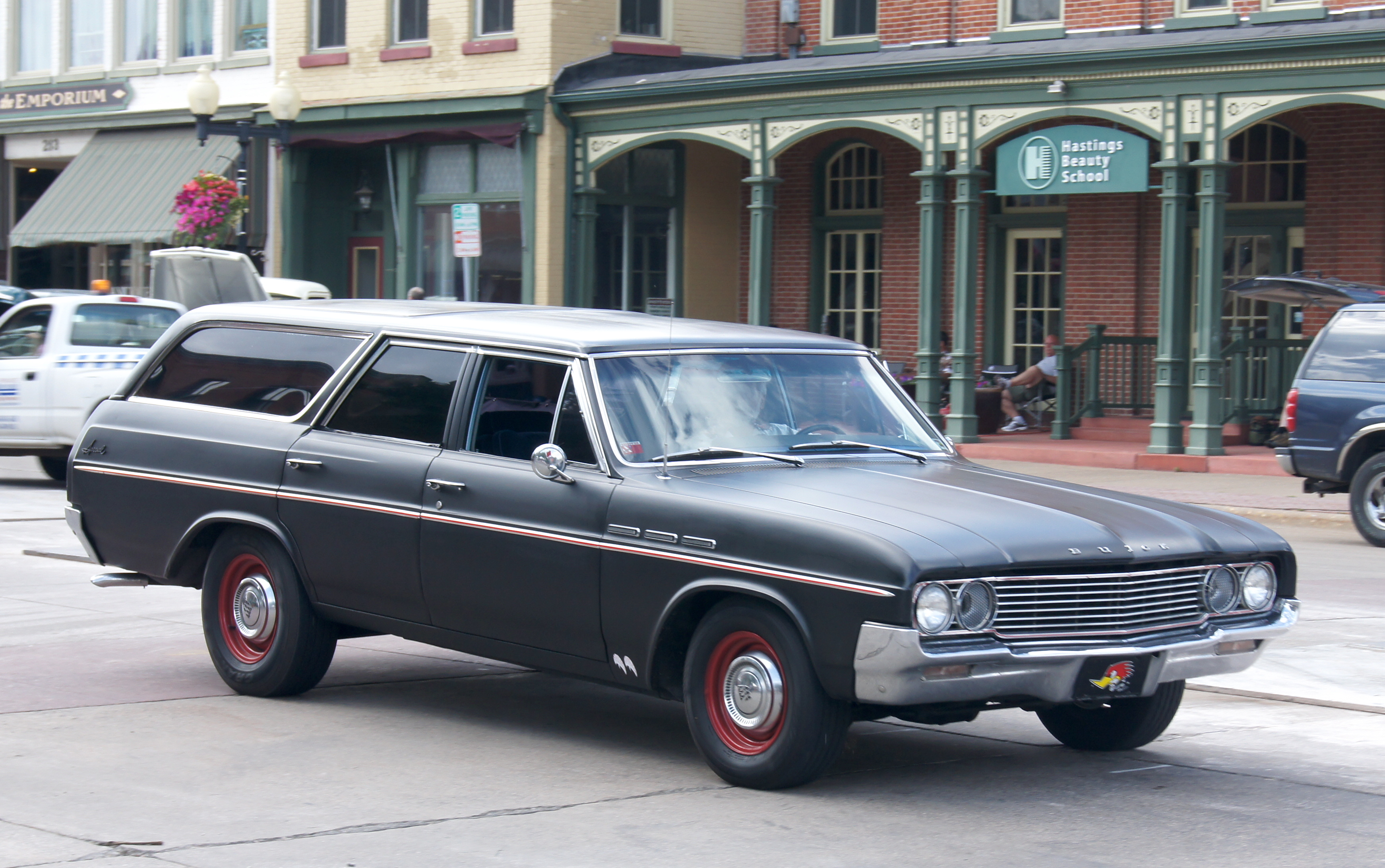
1964 Buick Special station wagon

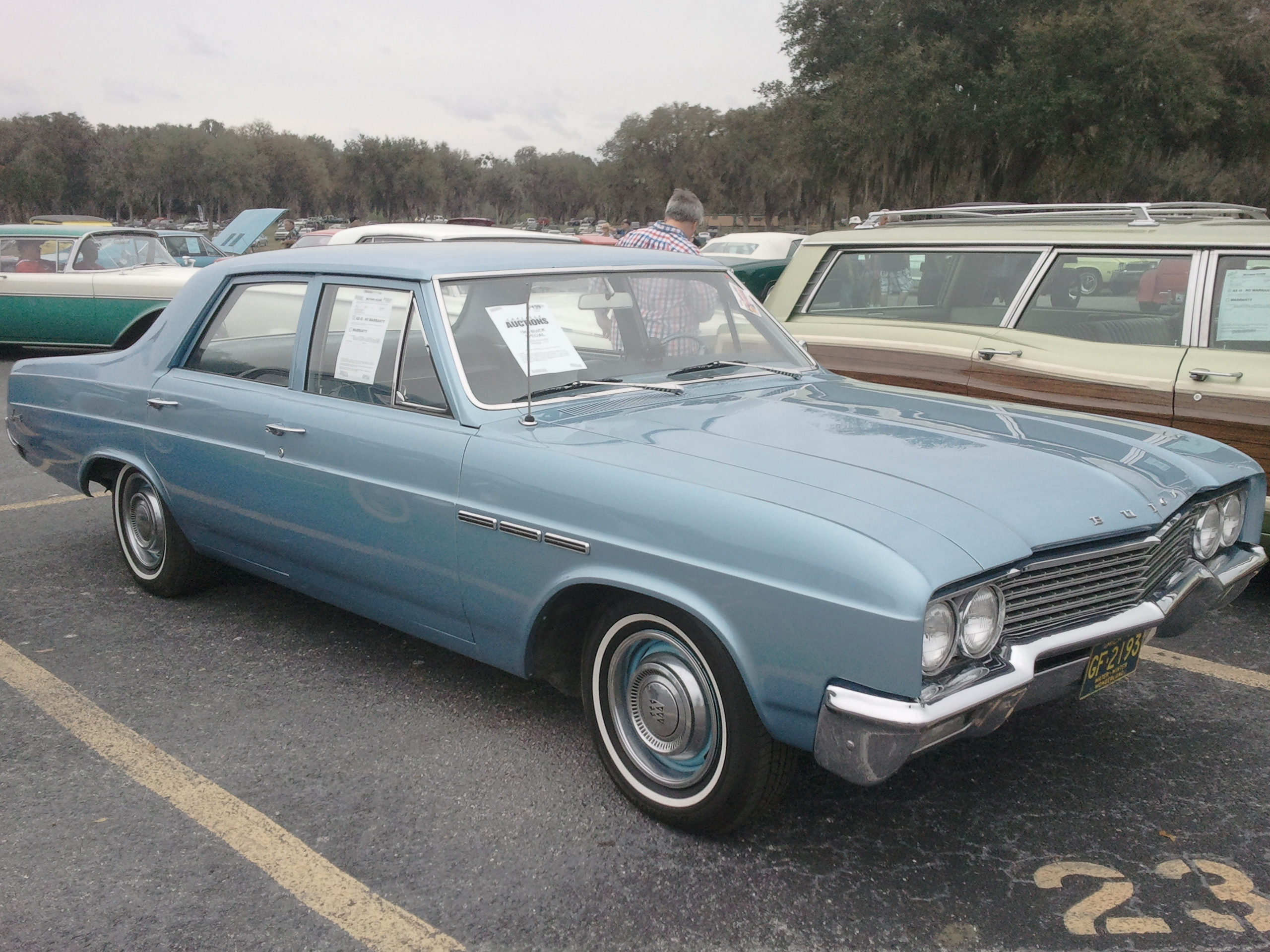
1965 Buick Special 4-door Sedan

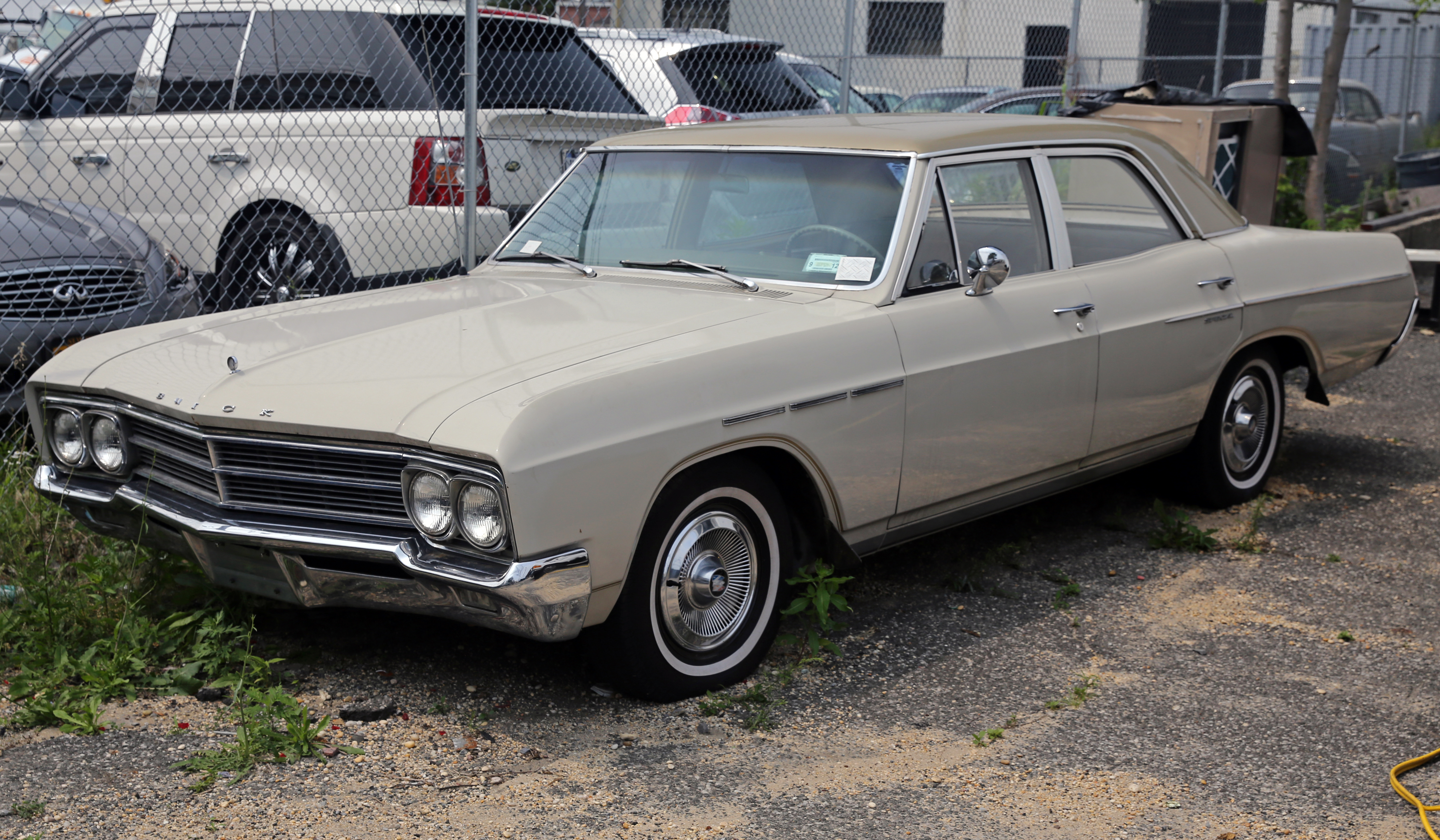
1966 Buick Special Deluxe 4-Door Sedan

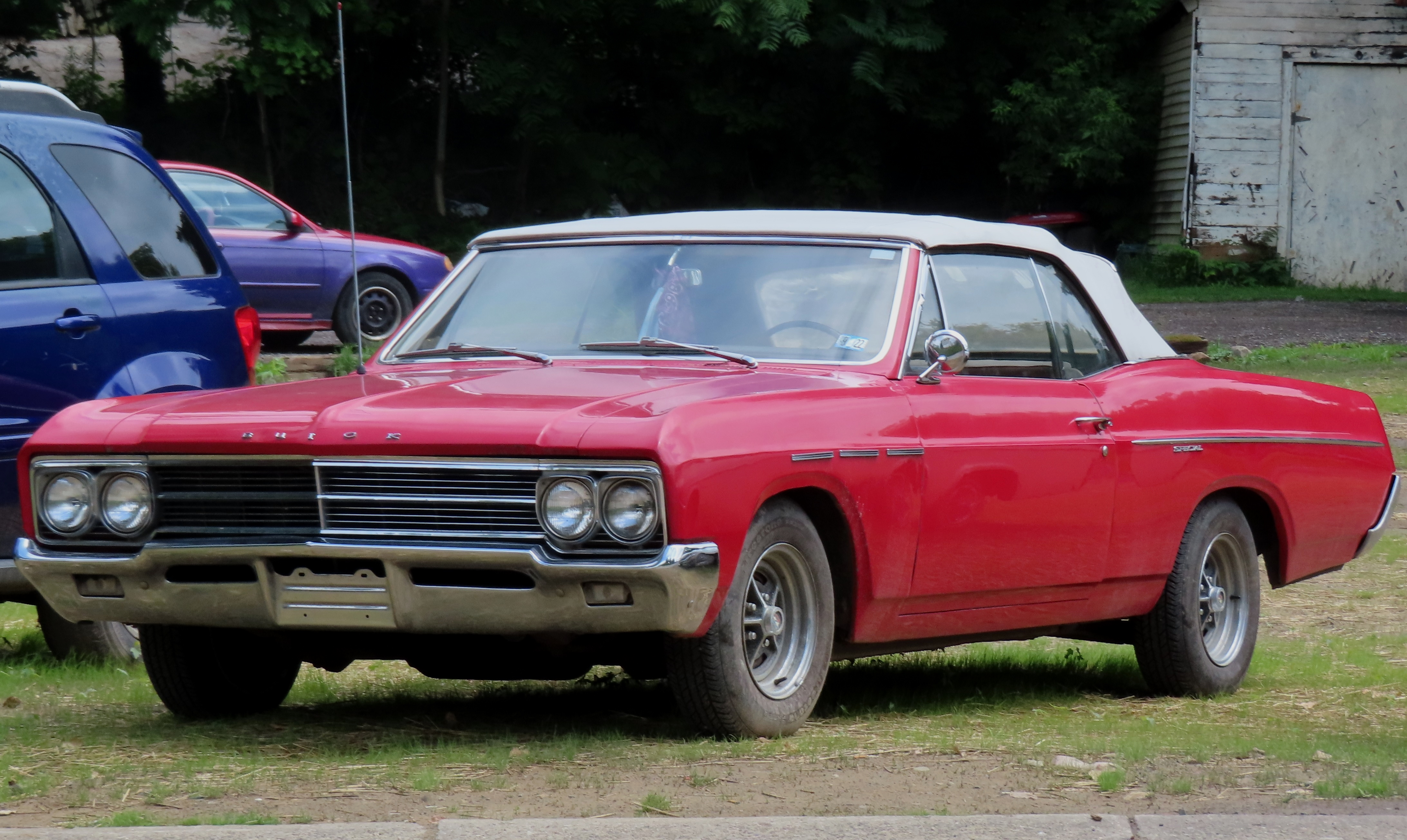
1966 Buick Special convertible

== 1968–1969 ==
Series 43300/43400
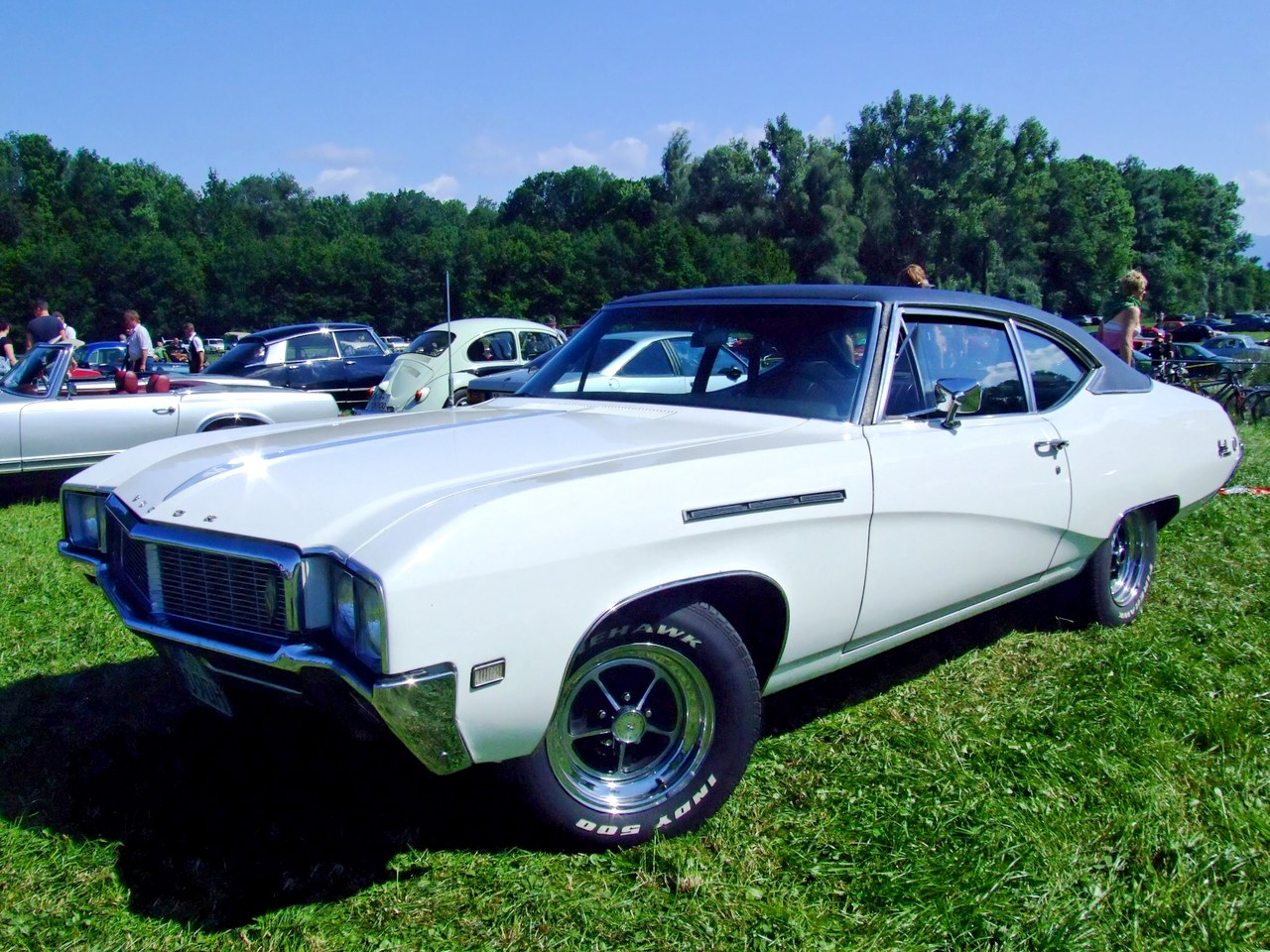
- 1968 Buick Special Deluxe Thin-Pillar Coupe

Overview
- Production: 1968–1969
- Assembly: (main plant); Flint, Michigan, United States, (Buick City) (branch assembly); Fremont, California, United States (Fremont Assembly); Oshawa, Ontario, Canada (Oshawa Car Assembly)

Body and chassis
- Body style: 2-door coupe 4-door sedan 4-door station wagon
- Platform: A-body
- Related: Chevrolet Chevelle; Oldsmobile Cutlass; Pontiac LeMans; Pontiac Tempest; Buick Skylark; Buick Gran Sport; Buick Sport Wagon

Powertrain
- Engine: 250 cu in (4.1 L) Chevrolet I6; 350 cu in (5.7 L) Buick V8
- Transmission: 3-speed manual 2-speed Super Turbine 300 automatic 3-speed THM350 automatic (1969 only)

Dimensions
- Wheelbase: 112 in (2,845 mm) (coupe); 116 in (2,946 mm) (sedan, station wagon)
- Length: 200.6 in (5,095 mm) 1968 (coupe); 200.7 in (5,098 mm) 1969 (coupe); 204.6 in (5,197 mm) 1968 (sedan); 204.7 in (5,199 mm) 1969 (sedan); 209 in (5,309 mm) 1968 (station wagon); 209.1 in (5,311 mm) 1969 (station wagon)

The Special nameplate was used on lower-priced intermediate-sized Buicks through the 1969 model year. In 1968 and 1969, the Buick Special was dropped and only Special Deluxes were manufactured. In 1970, the end of the Special came about when the Special Deluxe was dropped too in favor of the slightly upscale Buick Skylark.

The 1968 model year was one of significant change for the Buick Special and Skylark. Although still using the same basic chassis, all of GM's mid-sized cars adopted a policy of using two different length wheelbases. Two-door models used a shorter wheelbase of 112 in (2,845 mm), while four-door models used a longer wheelbase of 116 in (the Buick Sport Wagon and Oldsmobile Vista Cruiser used an even longer wheelbase of 121 in). All of GM's mid-sized cars received all-new sheet metal, incorporating a semi-fastback appearance, which was a revival of a streamlining on all GM products from 1942 until 1950 as demonstrated on the Buick Super Club Coupe (sedanette). More Federally mandated safety features improved occupant protection and accident avoidance, including side marker lights, shoulder belts (on all models built after January 1, 1968), and parking lights that illuminated with headlights.

In a reshuffling of models in the lineup, the Special Deluxe replaced the previous Special. The Skylark nameplate was shuffled down a notch to replace the previous Special Deluxe. The previous Skylark was replaced by a new Skylark Custom.

The Special Deluxe was available as a pillared two-door coupe, a pillared four-door sedan, or a 2-row station wagon.

The previous V6 was discontinued and the associated tooling was sold to Kaiser Industries, which used the V6 in its Jeep trucks and sport utility vehicles. The base engine in the Buick Special (and Buick Skylark) coupes & sedans) became a 250 cu in (4.1 L) Chevrolet I6, that produced 155 hp (116 kW) at 4200 rpm using a single-barrel Rochester carburetor.

Optional on the Special Deluxe coupe & sedan and standard on the Special Deluxe station wagon was a new 350-cubic-inch V8 derived from the 340, using a two-barrel Rochester carburetor that produced 230 hp (170 kW) at 4400 rpm. Optional on the Special Deluxe was a 350-cubic-inch V8 using a four-barrel Rochester carburetor that produced 280 hp (210 kW) at 4600 rpm. The Buick Special name was dropped after the 1969 model year. A locking steering column with a new, rectangular ignition key became standard on all 1969 GM cars (except Corvair), one year ahead of the Federal requirement.

For 1970, the Buick Skylark name was moved down another notch, replacing the previous entry-level Buick Special.

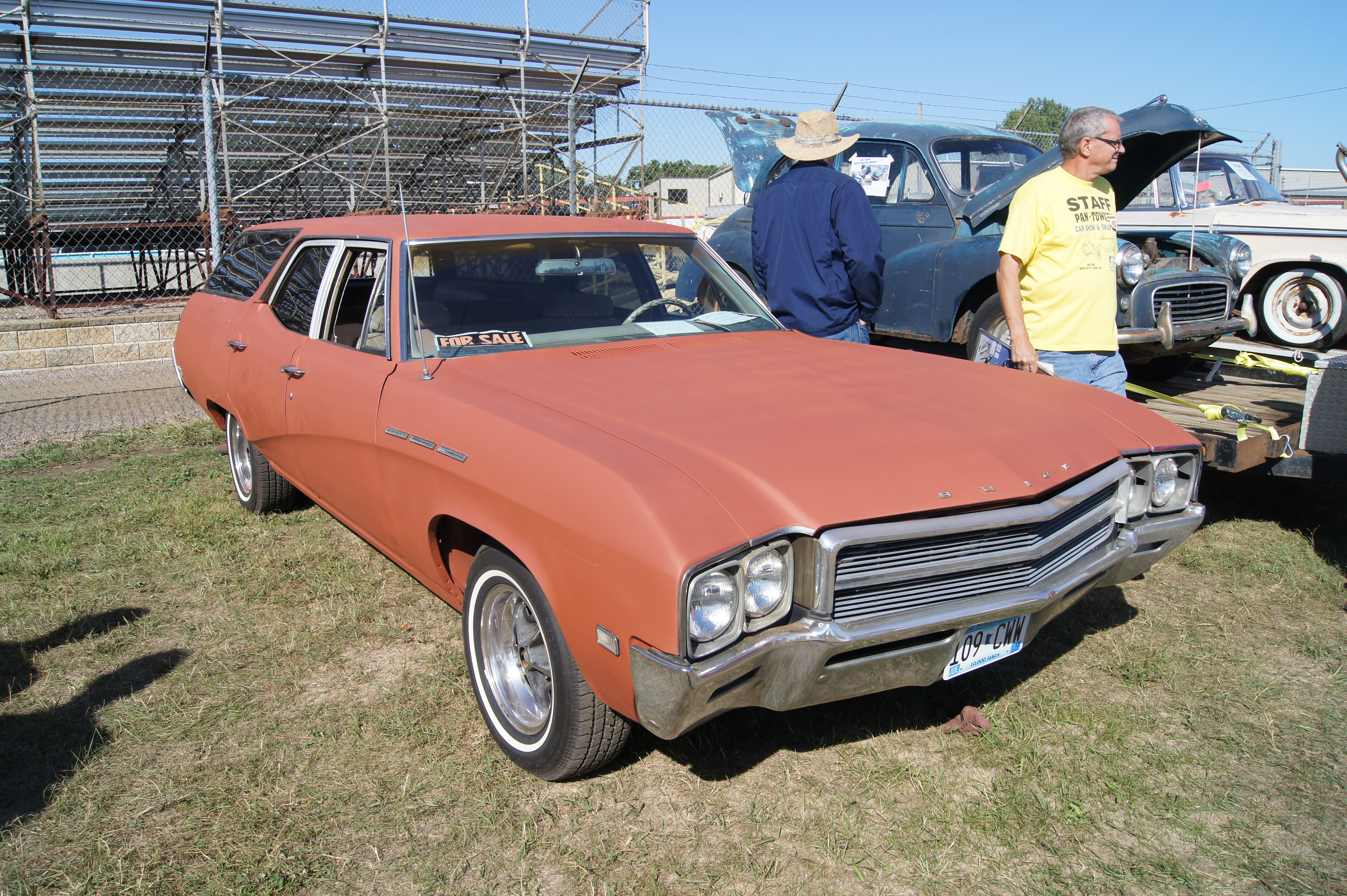
1969 Buick Special Deluxe Wagon

== 1975–1977 ==
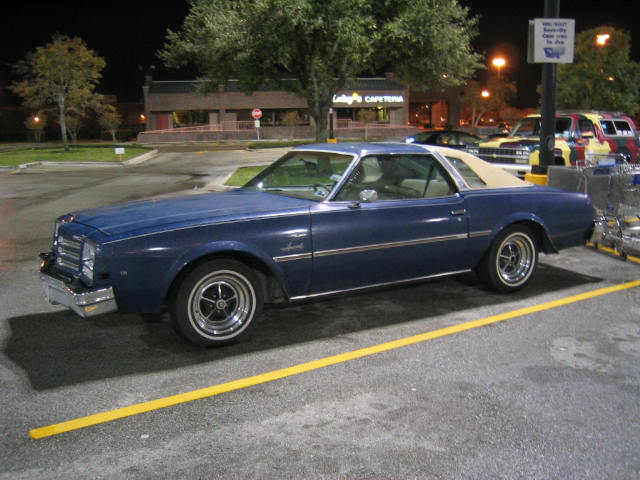
1977 Buick Century Special

The Special returned briefly to the GM A platform as an entry level subseries of the Buick Century. Although officially sold as the Buick Century Special, it was sometimes also referred to as just the Buick Special.

Century Specials were usually powered by Buick's own 231 V6; a V8 (from either Buick, Oldsmobile, or Chevrolet) was offered but rarely optioned. It used the "colonnade" roofline but was fitted with a landau roof that covered most of the rear quarter windows. The opening that was left was the same shape as the windows on the higher series formal-roof cars.

== 1978–1979 ==
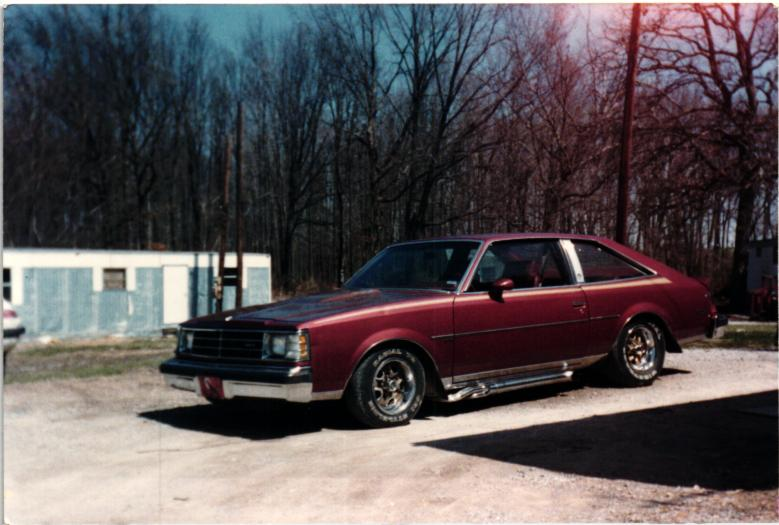
1978 Buick Century Special Fastback, with non-standard exhaust pipes.

In 1978 and 1979, the Special trim continued on the redesigned Century fastback and wagon models.

== 1991–1996 ==
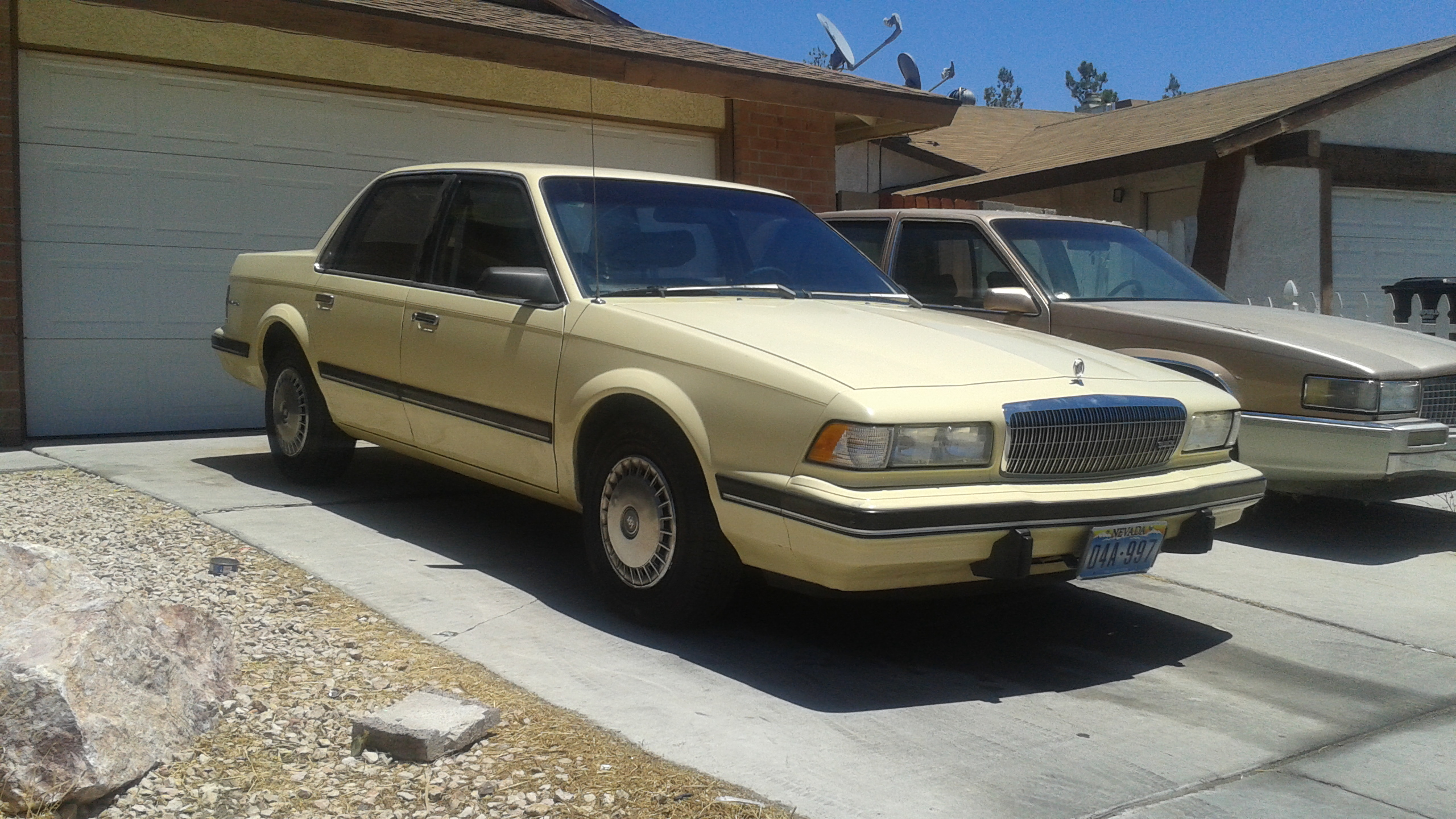
1992 Buick Century Special sedan

Special returned once again as the entry level trim on the Century sedan (starting 1991) and wagon (starting 1993). The "Special" designation was discontinued with the Century's redesign in 1997.
