= Buick Master Six =

1920s American automobile

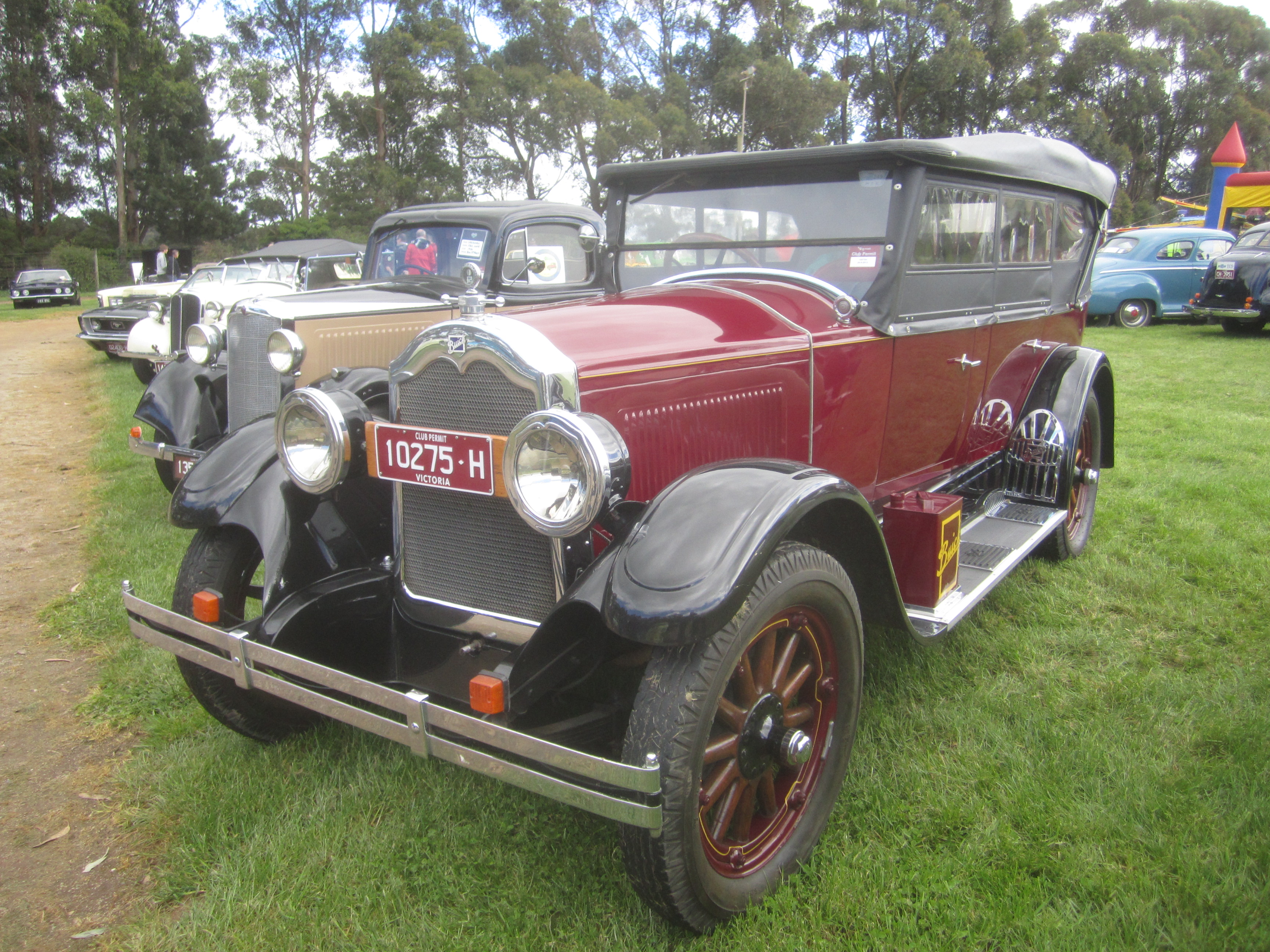
- 1927 Buick Master Six Deluxe Sport Touring Car Model 55

Overview
- Manufacturer: Buick (General Motors)
- Model years: 1925–1928
- Assembly: United States: Flint, Michigan (Buick City)

Body and chassis
- Class: luxury car
- Layout: Front-engine, rear-wheel-drive
- Platform: GM B platform
- Related: McLaughlin-Buick

Powertrain
- Engine: 255 cu in (4.2 L) Buick OHV I6; 274 cu in (4.5 L) Buick OHV I6
- Transmission: 3-speed synchromesh manual

Dimensions
- Wheelbase: 120 in (3,048 mm); 128 in (3,251 mm)

Chronology
- Predecessor: Buick Six
- Successor: Buick Series 60; Buick Series 80; Buick Series 90

The Buick Master Six (also Series 40 and Series 50 depending on wheelbase) was an automobile built by Buick from 1925 to 1928. Previously, the company manufactured the Buick Six that used the overhead valve six-cylinder 242 cu in (4.0 L) engine in their high-end cars, and the four-cylinder Buick Four for its smaller, less-expensive model.

After 1924, it dropped the four-cylinder engine and designed a small six, the Buick Standard Six, to replace the Buick Four. The name "Master Six" was introduced for high-end cars sharing the GM B platform with the Oldsmobile Model 30, and were powered by the 255 cu in (4.2 L) Buick inline-6 engine released the year before. The yearly changes were a result of a new business philosophy called planned obsolescence.

== History ==
As GM was sharing platforms and technology within their divisions, the Master Six was related to the Oldsmobile Model 30 with shared wheelbase and engine sizes. Buick had developed a market reputation as being a conservative luxury car, while the Cadillac and the Packard Six were more flamboyant, extravagant and expensive. The last Emperor of China Puyi bought two 1924 Master Six and started the trend of being China's most popular car.

To promote its durability, Buick President Harry H. Basset had a Touring Sedan driven around the world via a dealer-to-dealer network, where each location was responsible for driving the car to the next destination and having the log book signed for authenticity. 1927 saw the introduction of the Gothic Goddess hood ornament on all Buick products. The top of the radiator grille adopted a scalloped look that blended into the top of the engine cover which differed from both Oldsmobile and Cadillac sedans of the same year and was only offered from 1925 until 1928. It shared a similar appearance on all Packard products that first appeared in 1904 on the Packard Four, and the recently introduced Chrysler Imperial.

Buick named their six-cylinder cars "Buick Six" from 1916 through 1924, and in 1925, divided them into Standard Six and Master Six. The Master Six used Series 121 and 129 designations in 1929 initially to denote the wheelbase dimensions, then renamed the Series 40 in 1930. All were powered by the overhead valve Buick Straight-6 engine, with multiple body styles, and starting in 1926 used the newly established GM B platform, which it shared with Oldsmobile L-Series. Coachwork continued to be offered by Fisher Body who was the primary supplier of all GM products at this time, and Duco automotive lacquer paint, introduced by DuPont was the first quick drying multi-color line of nitrocellulose lacquers made especially for the automotive industry. Roadsters and touring sedans had the ability to fold the windshield forward on top of the cowl for open air driving.

The 255 cu in (4.2 L) engine used in 1925 was increased in size to 274 cu in (4.5 L) for 1926 through 1928. Displacement was increased again to 309 cu in (5.1 L) for the Series 121 and 129 in 1929 and Series 40 in 1930, after which all six-cylinder engines were dropped; all models of Buick were equipped with the new Straight 8 for 1931.

Buick's special order catalog was more modest than the Cadillac Series 341, but it did benefit from the specialized bodies made by Fisher Body which gave the Buick customer the same attention to style and refinement but at a modest price. The top level choice for the longest Buick wheelbase of 129 inches was the Imperial Sedan Limousine for US$2145 ($39,756 in 2025 dollars).

The Master Six was Buick's high-end offering, above the Standard Six. It was also manufactured from knock-down kits at GM's short-lived Japanese factory at Osaka Assembly in Osaka, Japan. The Master Six was also sold with a junior model, called the Standard Six which was renamed in 1929 as the Series 116 and Series 121.

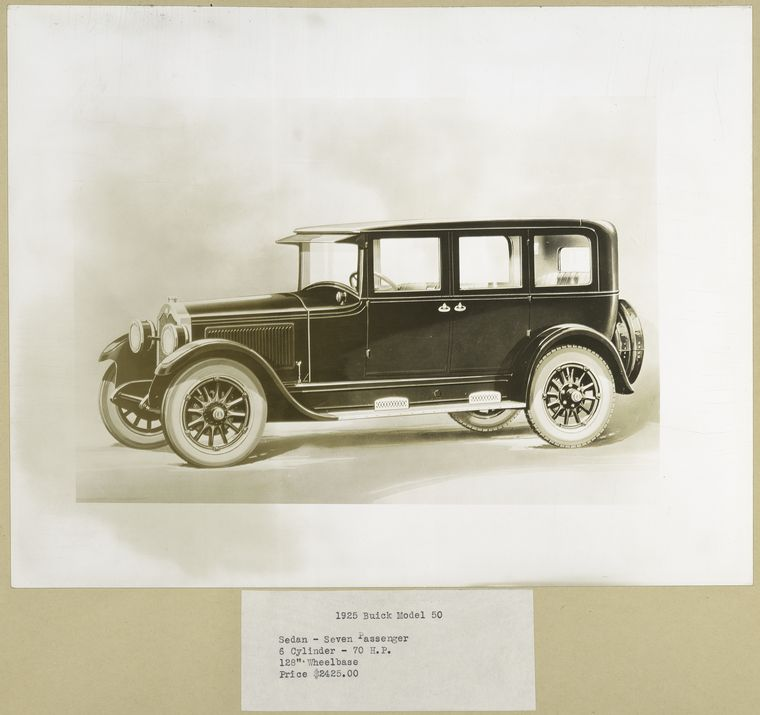
1925 Buick Master Six Sedan Model 50

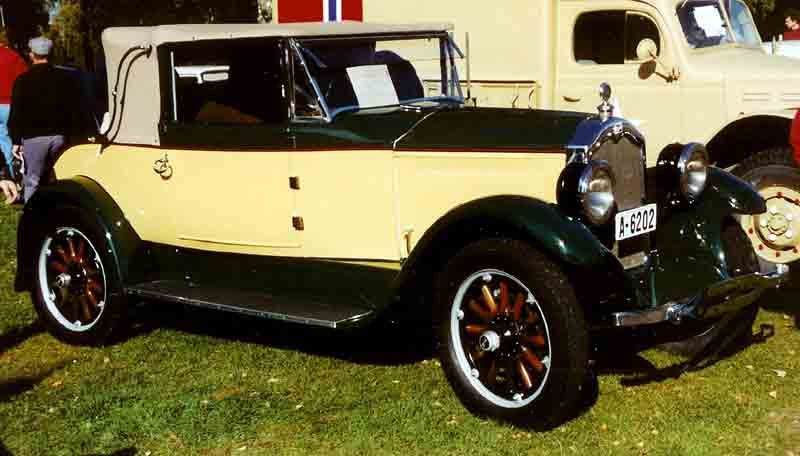
1927 Buick Master Six Series 128 Convertible Coupe Model 54CC

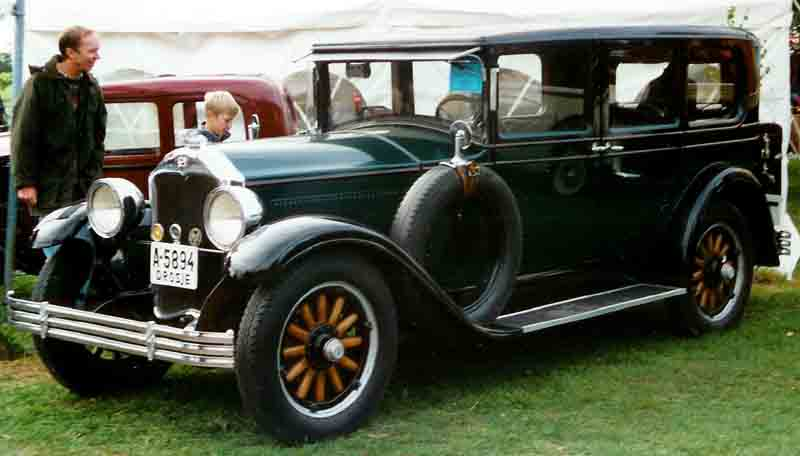
1928 Buick Master Six Series 120 4-Door Sedan Model 50

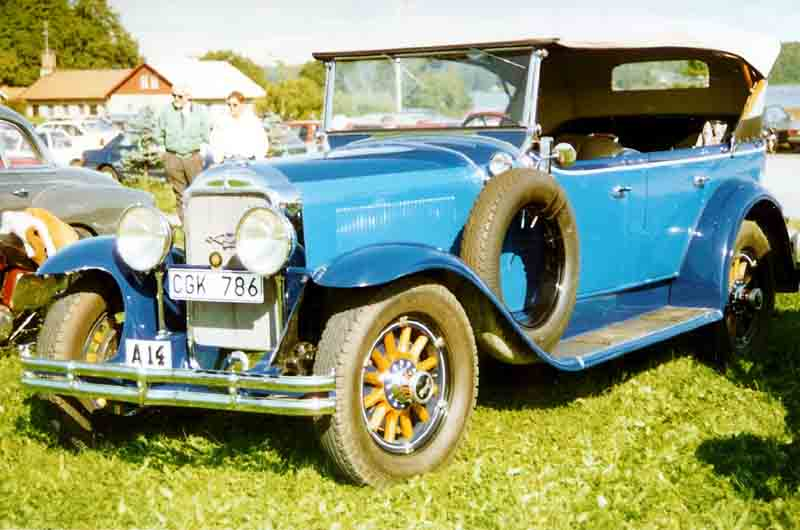
1929 Buick Master Six Series 129 Touring Sedan Model 49

== See also ==
- Cadillac Type V-63
- Oldsmobile L-Series
- Oakland Six
- Pontiac Six
- Chevrolet Superior
