= Buick Limited =

Line of upscale cars

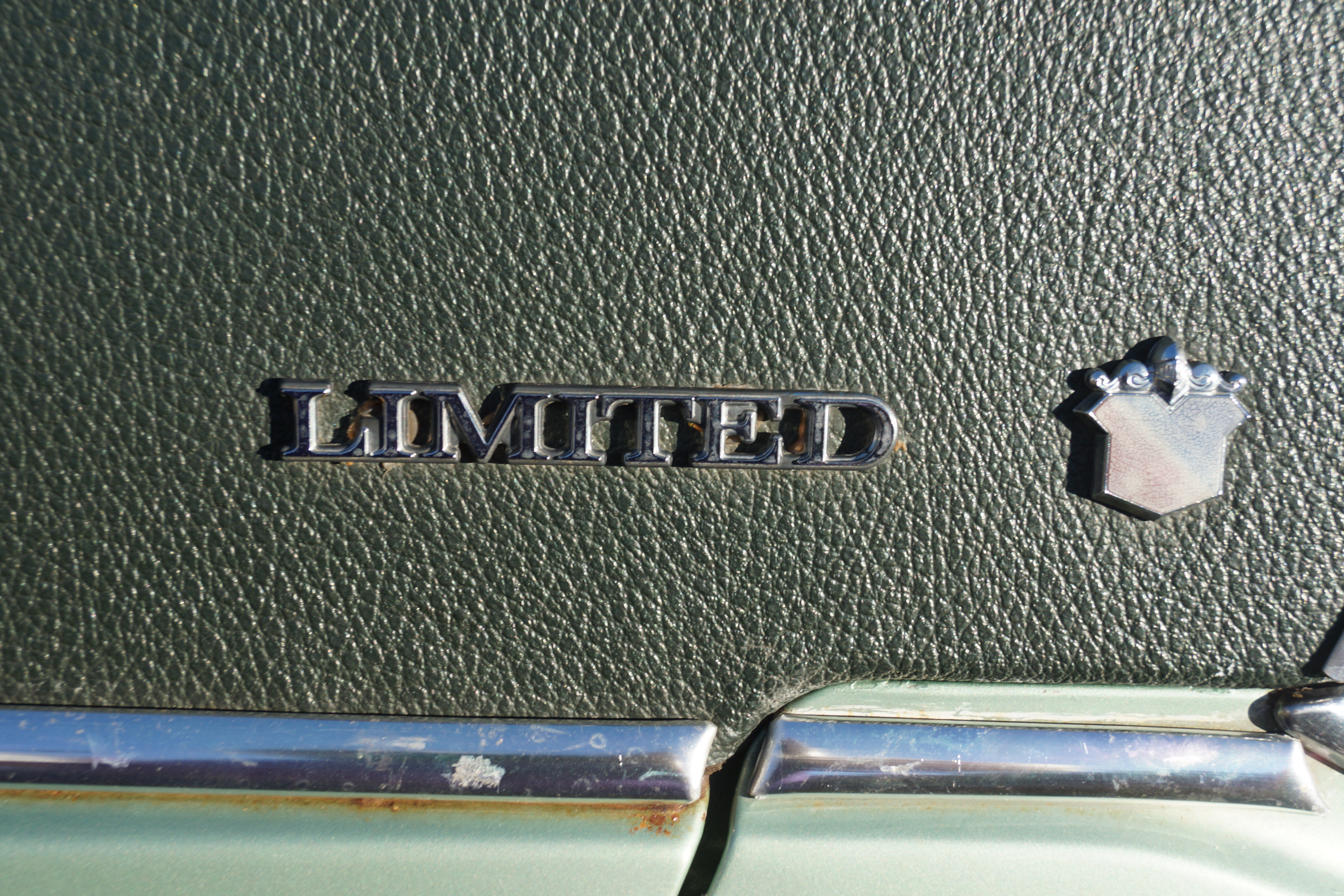
- Badging on a 1973 Buick Electra 225 Limited

Overview
- Manufacturer: Buick (General Motors)
- Model years: 1936–1942; 1958

Body and chassis
- Class: Full-size car (1931–1942); Full-size car (1958)
- Body style: 4-door limousine (1931–1942); 4-door hardtop (1958); 2-door hardtop (1958); 2-door convertible (1958)
- Layout: FR layout (1931–1958)

Chronology
- Predecessor: Buick Master Six

The Buick Limited was Buick's flagship model line between 1936 and 1942, and, in celebration of General Motors' 50th anniversary, a single-year halo car for the division in the 1958 model year. Since the 1960s, Buick has intermittently used the term "Limited" as a designation denoting its highest level of trim and standard features in its various model ranges.

The original line given the Limited nameplate, topped by an extended-wheelbase limousine, was in direct competition with Cadillac senior sedans for clientele, which wanted a GM luxury car but regarded Cadillac as "ostentatious" or "flamboyant" in contrast to Buick's reputation for durable, reliable, and staid premium vehicles.

== Buick Series 90 (1931-1935) ==
Series 90
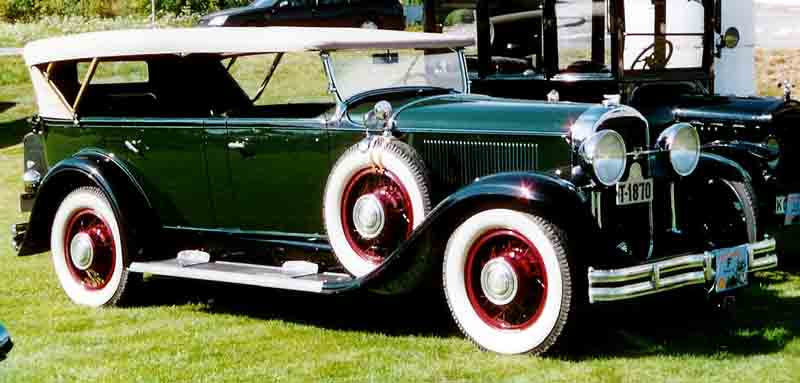
- 1931 Buick Series 90 Phaeton Model 95

Overview
- Manufacturer: Buick (General Motors)
- Model years: 1931-1935
- Assembly: Buick City, Flint, Michigan, United States

Body and chassis
- Class: luxury car
- Body style: 2-door coupe 2-door convertible 4-door phaeton 4-door sedan 4-door limousine
- Layout: Front-engine, rear-wheel-drive
- Platform: GM C platform
- Related: Cadillac Series 355; Buick Series 80; McLaughlin-Buick

Powertrain
- Engine: 344.8 cu in (5.7 L) Buick Straight-8 engine OHV I8
- Transmission: 3-speed synchromesh manual

Dimensions
- Wheelbase: 132 in (3,353 mm); 134 in (3,404 mm); 138 in (3,505 mm)

Buick's top platform was introduced in 1931 as the Series 90, using the GM "C-body" platform shared with the Cadillac Series 355. It featured a 344.8 cu in (5.7 L) Straight-8 OHV engine, developing 104 bhp of power at 2,800 rpm. A premium luxury car, it was intended to compete with the advanced Cadillac V8, the exclusive straight-8 Packard Standard Eight, and other top U.S. marques.

Closed cars came with mohair velvet interiors, retractable silk passenger compartment shades, and wool carpeting throughout. Roadsters, Phaetons and convertibles came standard with leather interior. Retail prices for the seven-passenger Limousine were US$2,035 ($43,082 in 2025 dollars). The Series 90 offered nearly the same refinement and attention to detail as Cadillac, but lacked its more modern, more powerful engine, while having a more advanced overhead valve train than the Packard's aging flathead design. Standard coachwork for Buick was exclusively supplied by Fisher Body, and rolling chassis were available to coachbuilders.

The size grew the next year, and a new high-performance engine was introduced developing 113 hp. In 1933, all GM cars received an updated "streamlined" look, produced by the corporation's Art and Color Studio headed by Harley Earl. In 1934, the running board was shortened and engine output increased to 116 hp. In 1935 the appearance alone was updated. Total sales for the line was 43,321. In 1936, the model changed its name to 90 Limited.

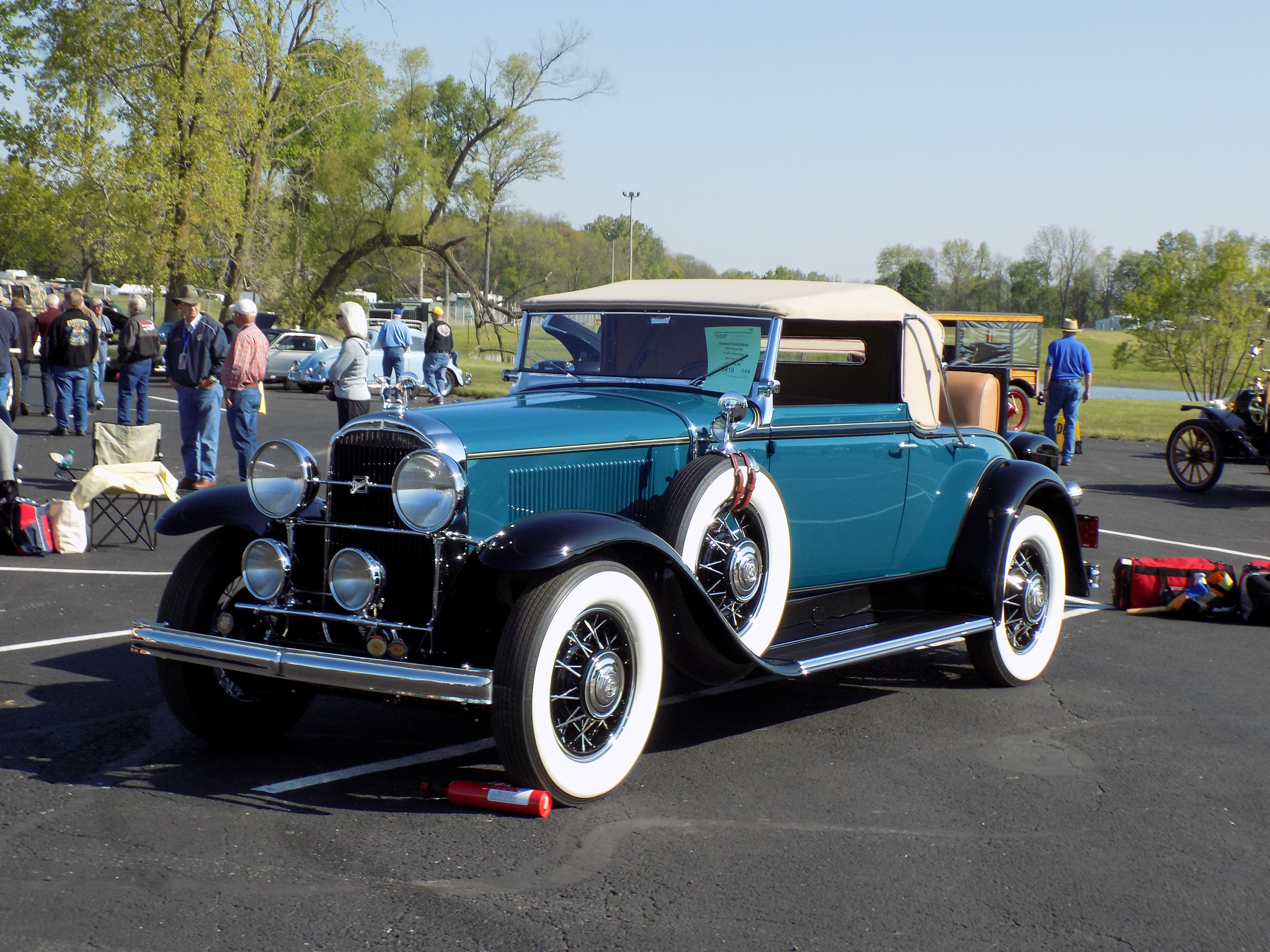
1931 Buick Series 90 convertible

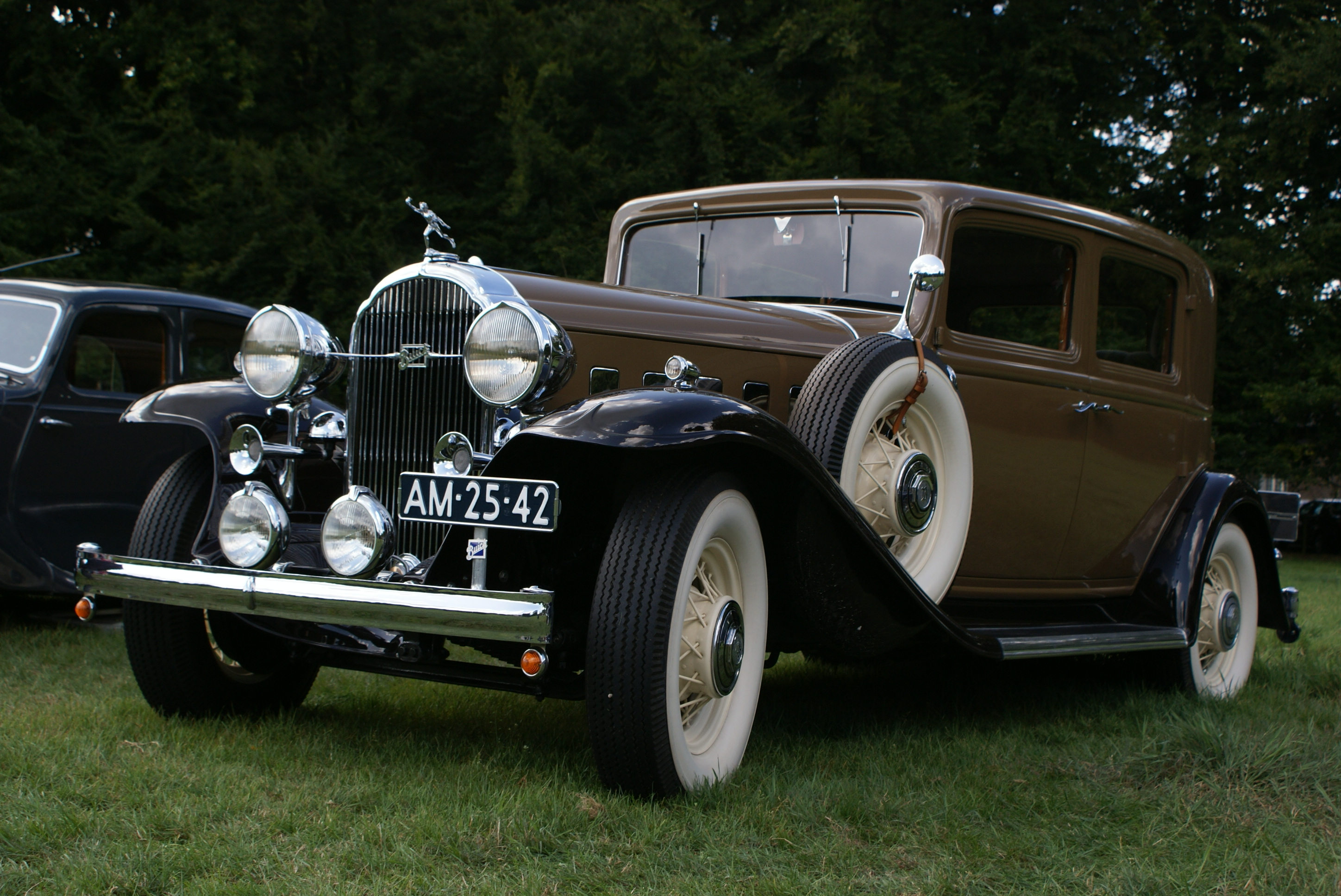
1932 Buick Series 90

== Buick Limited (1936-1942) ==
Series 90
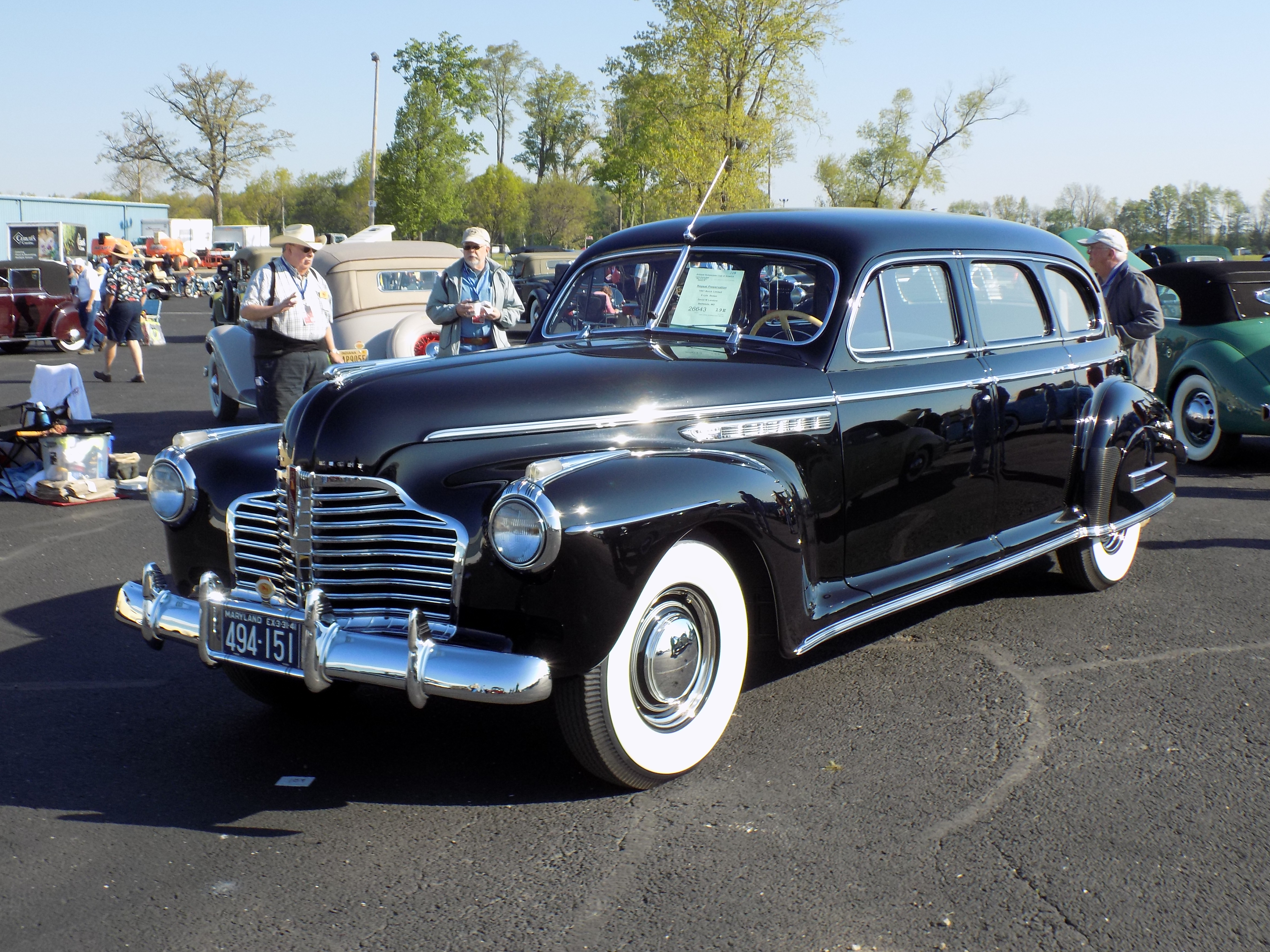
- 1941 Buick Limited

Overview
- Model years: 1936–1942
- Assembly: (main plant); Buick City, Flint, Michigan, U.S. (branch plant); South Gate, California, U.S. Linden, New Jersey, U.S.
- Designer: Harley Earl

Body and chassis
- Body style: 4-door sedan 4-door convertible
- Platform: Series 80: C-body; Series 90: D-body
- Related: Cadillac Series 80; Cadillac Series 70; Buick Roadmaster; McLaughlin-Buick

Powertrain
- Engine: 320 cu in (5.2 L) Fireball I8
- Transmission: 3-speed sliding shift manual

Dimensions
- Wheelbase: 138 in (3,505 mm); 140 in (3,556 mm) (Series 90)
- Width: 75.0 in (1,905 mm)
- Height: 1936: 69.5 in (1,765 mm); 1937: 68.0 in (1,727 mm)
- Curb weight: 4,517–4,599 lb (2,050–2,090 kg)

The origins of the Limited name date to 1936, when Buick added names to its entire model lineup to celebrate the engineering improvements and design advancements over their 1935 models. It shared its chassis with the top-level Cadillac Series 70 vehicles. Buick had released a new line of cars that were technically superior to their predecessors by offering such features as all-steel passenger compartment tops (GM's Turret Top design), improved front suspension, improved hydraulic safety braking system, alloy engine pistons and an improved engine cooling system.

In 1938, the wheelbase was stretched two inches from 138 to 140 inches (3,556 mm), and the Limited, along with Roadmaster, lost its wooden structural members for steel, making them the last Buick passenger cars to rely upon wood components.

In 1939, Buick products underwent a substantial redesign; however, the Limited's "limited" production merited it to continue using its 1938 body. The 1939 Limited offered a sectioned rear compartment separating the driver from the rear passengers, and a glass partition could be raised to provide privacy. AM radios were first offered as an option.

Behind the scenes, Cadillac executives lobbied to get the Limited out of production because it infringed on their market. While it was priced in the lower end of its Fleetwood series price point, the Limited was listed at US$2,453 ($56,777 in 2025 dollars) but almost equaled Cadillac's factory-built Imperial Touring Limousine, which cost almost four times as much as the Buick, in its appointments. Buick executives asserted that Limited production averaged only 1,561 vehicles per year for model years 1938 through 1940, an insignificant amount compared to Cadillac's production of its senior cars.

For 1940, Buick renamed some of its Series designations and gave names instead. Buick's Series 40 was named the Special, the Series 50 became the Super, the Series 60 was named the Century, the Series 70 was named the Roadmaster, and the Limited was given both the Series 80 and Series 90 names, with the Series 90 given to a limousine with a 140 in (3,556 mm) wheelbase and 8-passenger capacity. The engine was a 320 cu in (5,243.9 cc) 120 hp (89 kW; 122 PS) Buick Straight-8 engine, improving to 141 hp (105 kW; 143 PS) by 1939.

Limiteds were the most expensive Buicks in production, riding on the company's longest wheelbase of 138 in (3,505 mm), and the best appointed cars that Buick built. All Limiteds were built at the Buick factory in Buick City, Flint, Michigan, while all Cadillacs were built at the Clark Street Facility in Detroit, with coachwork provided by Fisher Body.

Production of the Limited and all Buicks continued until the United States' entry into World War II in 1941; the last Buick was built on February 2, 1942. Following the war, Buick dropped its extended wheelbase models, and cancelled the Series 90 Limited nameplate. The name Limited was truly appropriate to the cars themselves, which were limited to touring sedans and limousines; its sales were also the smallest of Buick's entire model range:

Production Figures
| Year | Units |
| 1936 | 4,086 |
| 1937 | 3,697 |
| 1938 | 1,491 |
| 1939 | 1,451 |
| 1940 | 1,739 |
| 1941 | 3,006 |
| 1942 | 636 (abbreviated model year September 1941 to January 1942) |
Total production = 16,106

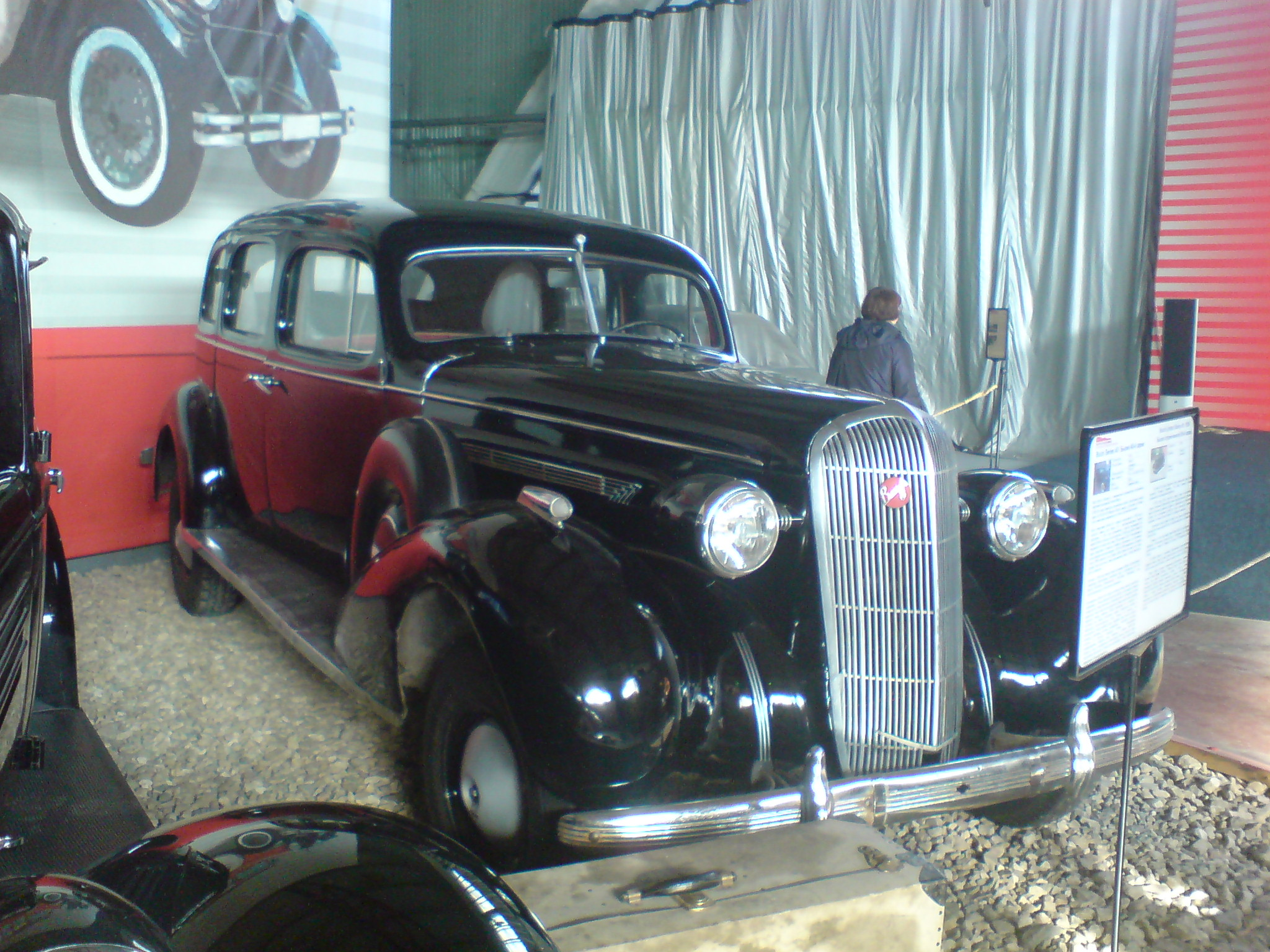
1936 Buick Limited Series 90

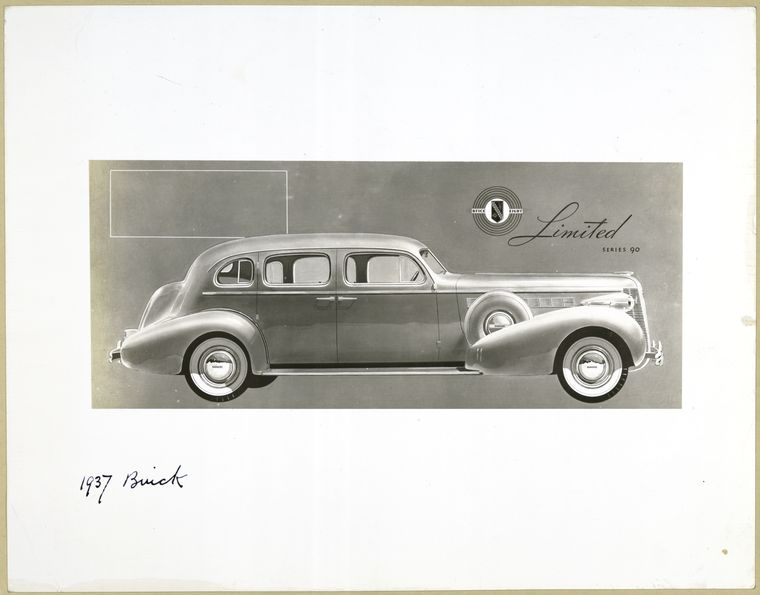
1937 Buick Limited Series 90

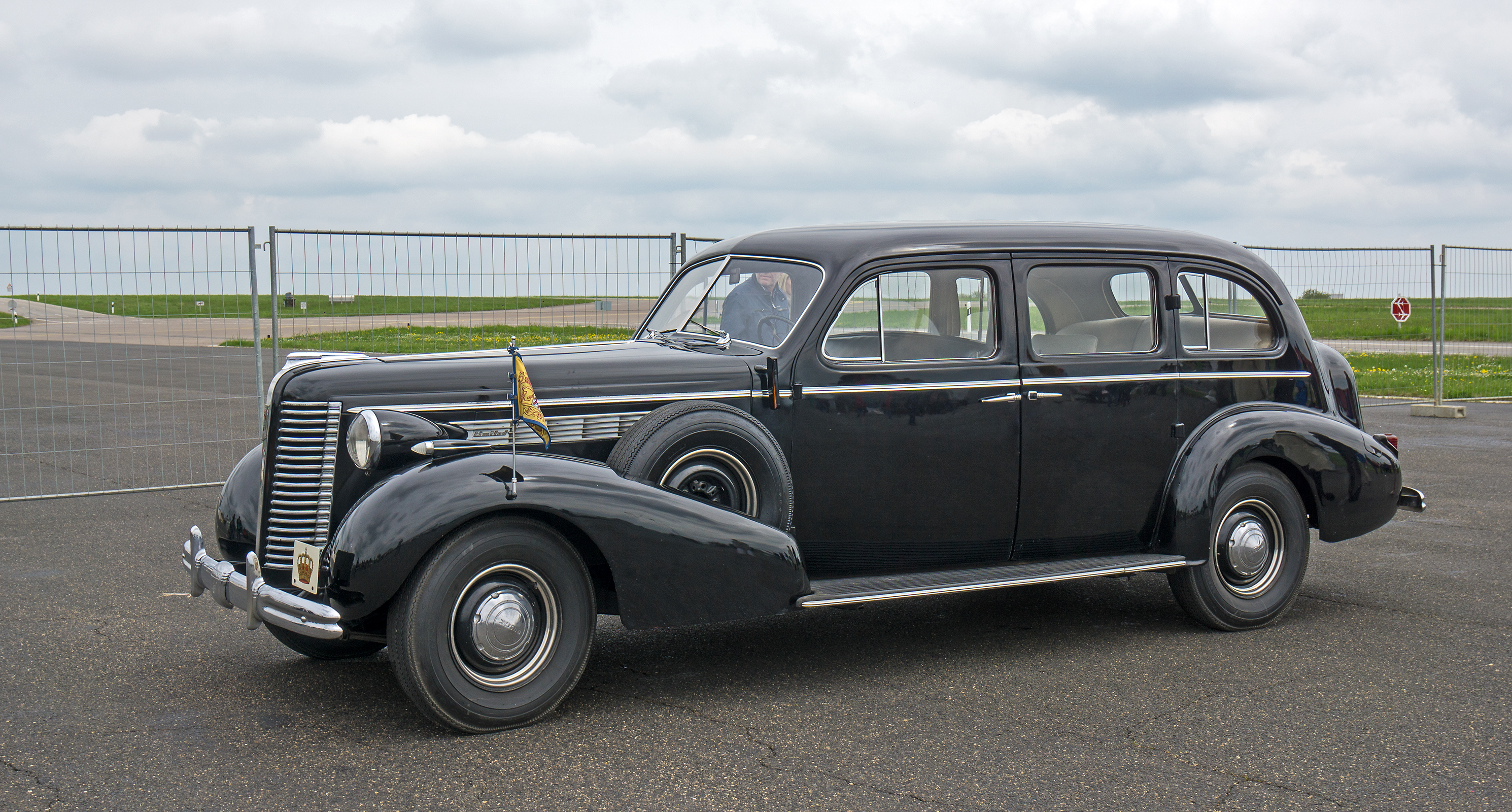
1938 Buick Limited Series 90

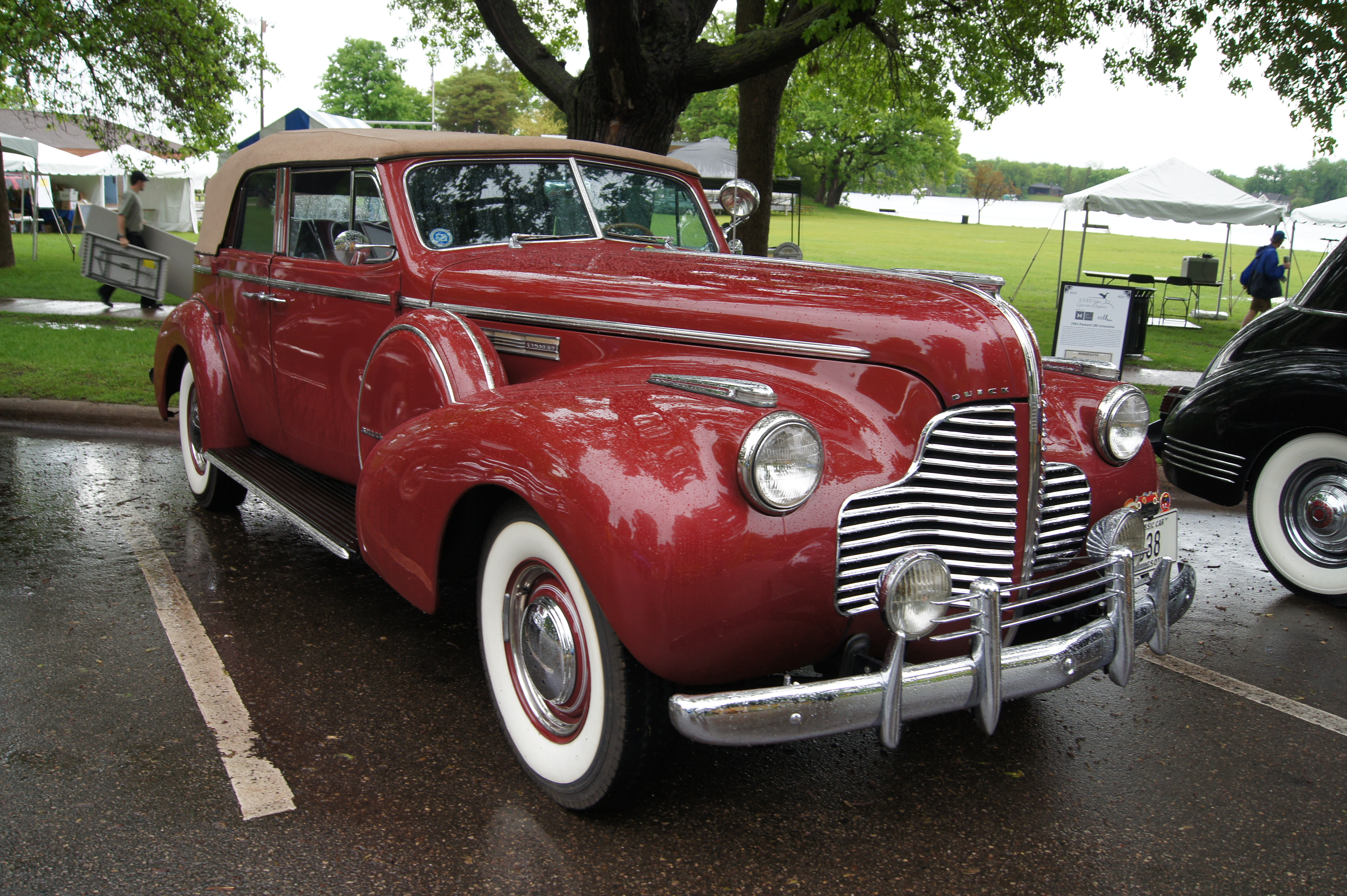
1940 Buick Limited Convertible Sedan

== 1958 Limited ==
Series 700
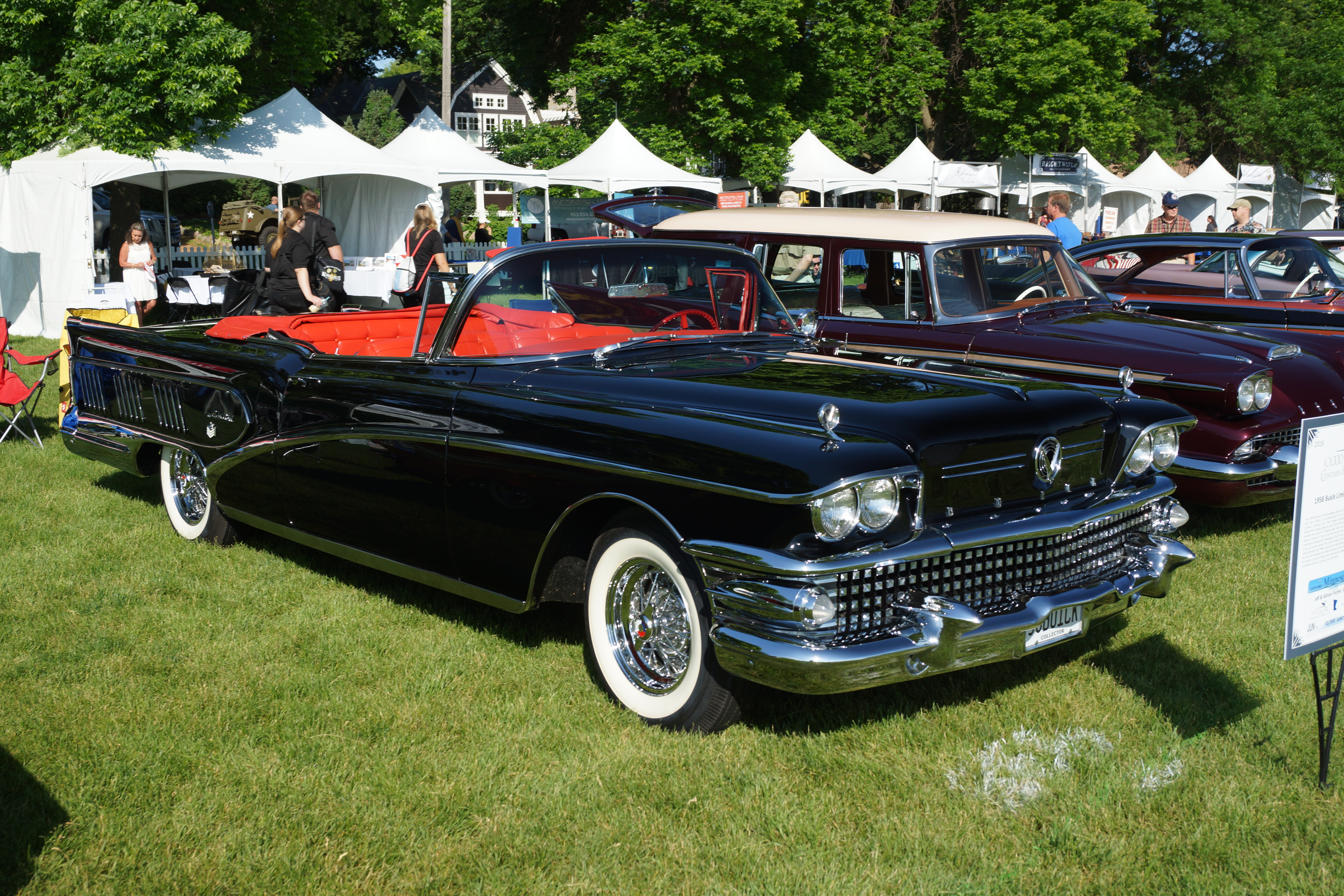

Overview
- Model years: 1958
- Assembly: (main plant); Flint, Michigan, U.S. (Buick City) (branch plant); Arlington, Texas, U.S. (Arlington Assembly); Doraville, Georgia, U.S. (Doraville Assembly) "Atlanta"; Kansas City, Kansas, U.S. (Fairfax Assembly); South Gate, California, U.S. (South Gate Assembly); Wilmington, Delaware, U.S. (Wilmington Assembly); Framingham, Massachusetts, U.S. Linden, New Jersey, U.S.
- Designer: Harley Earl

Body and chassis
- Body style: 4-door hardtop 2-door hardtop 2-door convertible
- Platform: C-body
- Related: Cadillac Series 62; Buick Roadmaster; Buick Super; Oldsmobile 98

Powertrain
- Engine: 364 cu in (6.0 L) Nailhead V8
- Transmission: 2-speed Dynaflow automatic

Dimensions
- Wheelbase: 127.5 in (3,238 mm)
- Length: 227.5 in (5,778 mm)
- Width: 79.8 in (2,027 mm)
- Height: 60.0 in (1,524 mm)
- Curb weight: 4,500–4,900 lb (2,000–2,200 kg)

Chronology
- Successor: Buick Electra 225

In celebration of General Motors' 50th anniversary, the Buick Limited name was revived as a single-year halo car for the 1958 model year. In comparison to the chrome-laden junior models in the Buick lineup, the GM C platform-based Limited was slightly more restrained than the Special, Century, Super and Roadmaster. Instead of a chromed side panel trim, it got a body color-keyed insert decorated with fifteen slanted hash marks (three groups of five). The Limited also received its own rear tail treatment that traded the heavy chrome tail light housings for a wraparound tail light lens broken up by four chrome bands. Rear bumper "Dagmars" housed "Dual Jet" back-up lights. In the front, it received the same aggressive Fashion-Aire Dynastar grille, cast of 160 chrome squares, each "shaped in a design to maximize the amount of reflective light", according to Buick PR. Power brakes were standard.

Available only as a 4-door hardtop, 2-door hardtop coupe or convertible, the Limited rode Buick's 127.5 in (3,238 mm) wheelbase, and overall length 227.1 in (5,768 mm). Interiors were of high quality fabrics in sedans and coupes, full leather in convertibles.

Buick sold only 7,438 Limiteds, due in part to their price. The Limited's four-door hardtop sedan started at a base price of $5,112, ($57,046 in 2025 dollars) which was $221 ($2,466 in 2025 dollars) higher than Cadillac's entry-level Series 62 four-door hardtop sedan at $4,891 ($54,579 in 2025 dollars) of which Cadillac sold 13,335 units.

For the 1959 model year, Buick renamed its entire lineup, with the Super becoming the Invicta, the Roadmaster becoming the Electra 225.

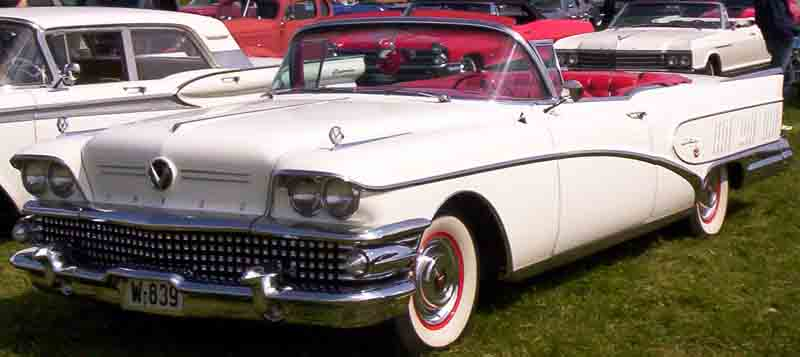
1958 Buick Limited Riviera convertible

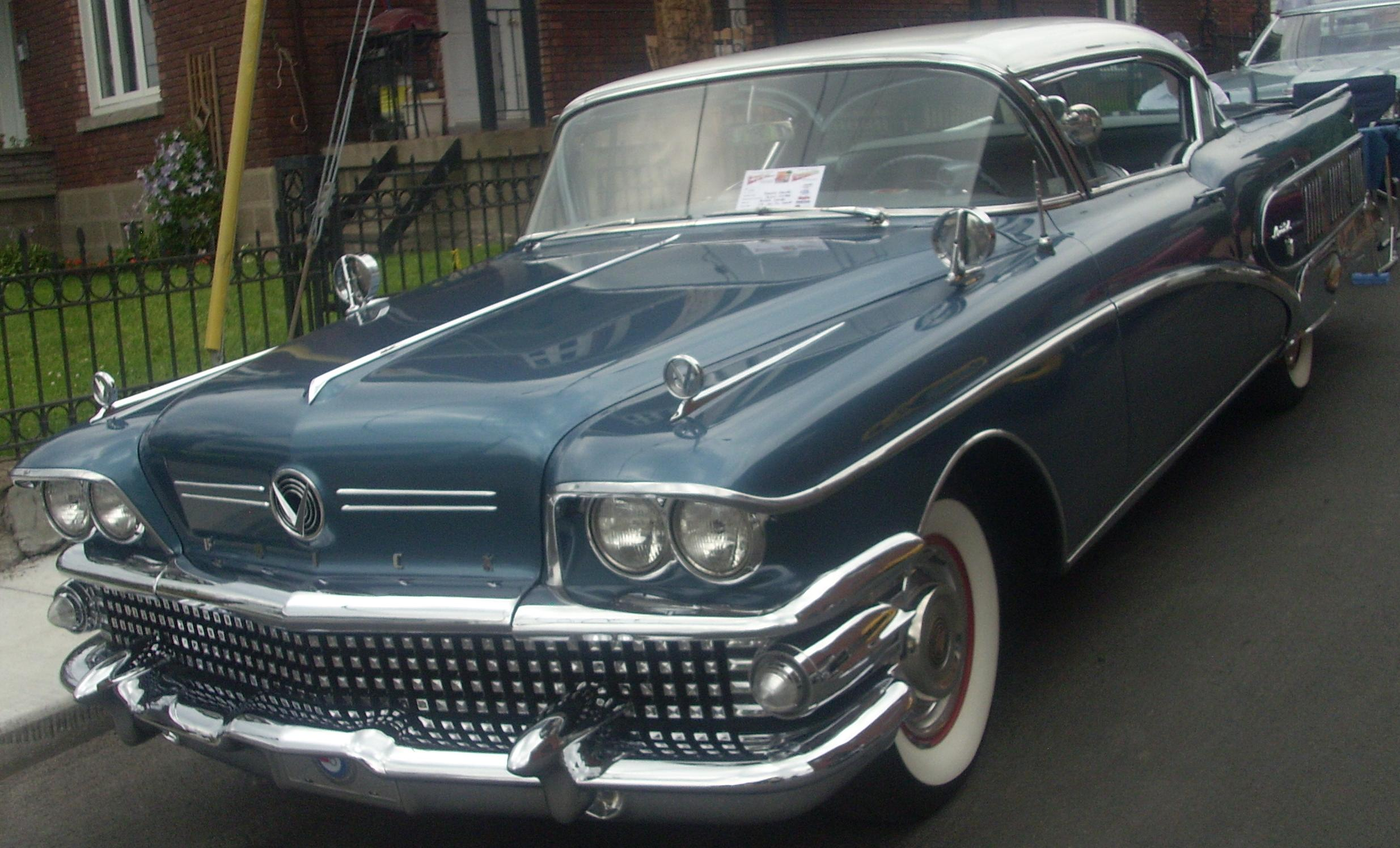
1958 Buick Limited Riviera coupe

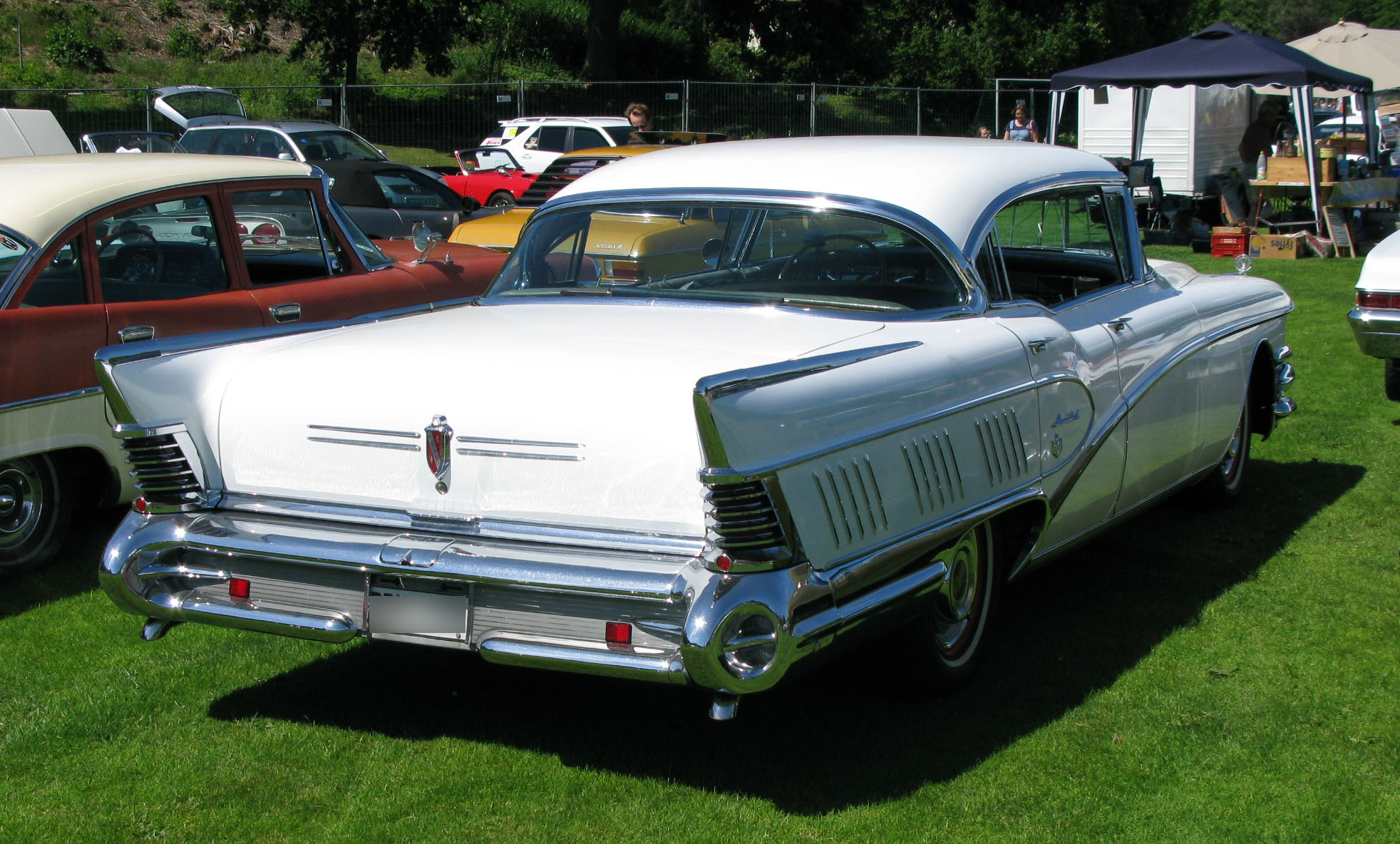
1958 Buick Limited Riviera sedan rear

== Limited trim package ==
The Limited name was used again in 1967 as a trim option on the Electra 225 Custom model and other models. Between 1971 and 1979, Buick added the "Limited" name to its top trim Electra 225, which was previously known as the Electra 225 Custom. The cars were not badged as Electra 225s, but instead wore "Limited" scripts. However, these cars were Electra 225s, and in a break from tradition, the "Limited" trim level could be optioned with either the Park Avenue or Park Avenue DeLuxe options package, each even more well-equipped than the Limited model alone.

Buick continued to use the designation of "Limited" through 2005 on its various models, typically to denote the highest trim level in a model range.

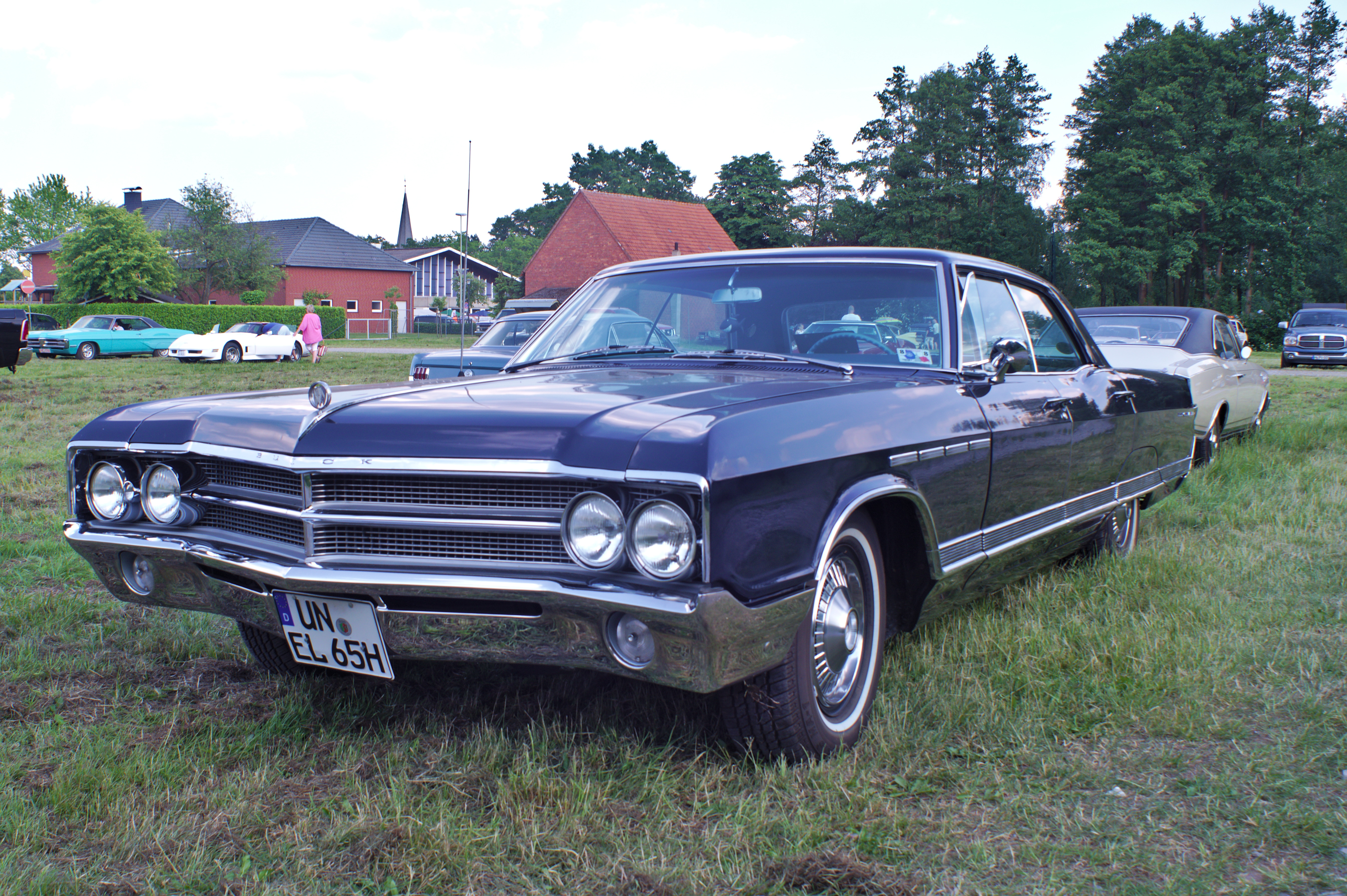
1965 Buick Electra 225 Limited

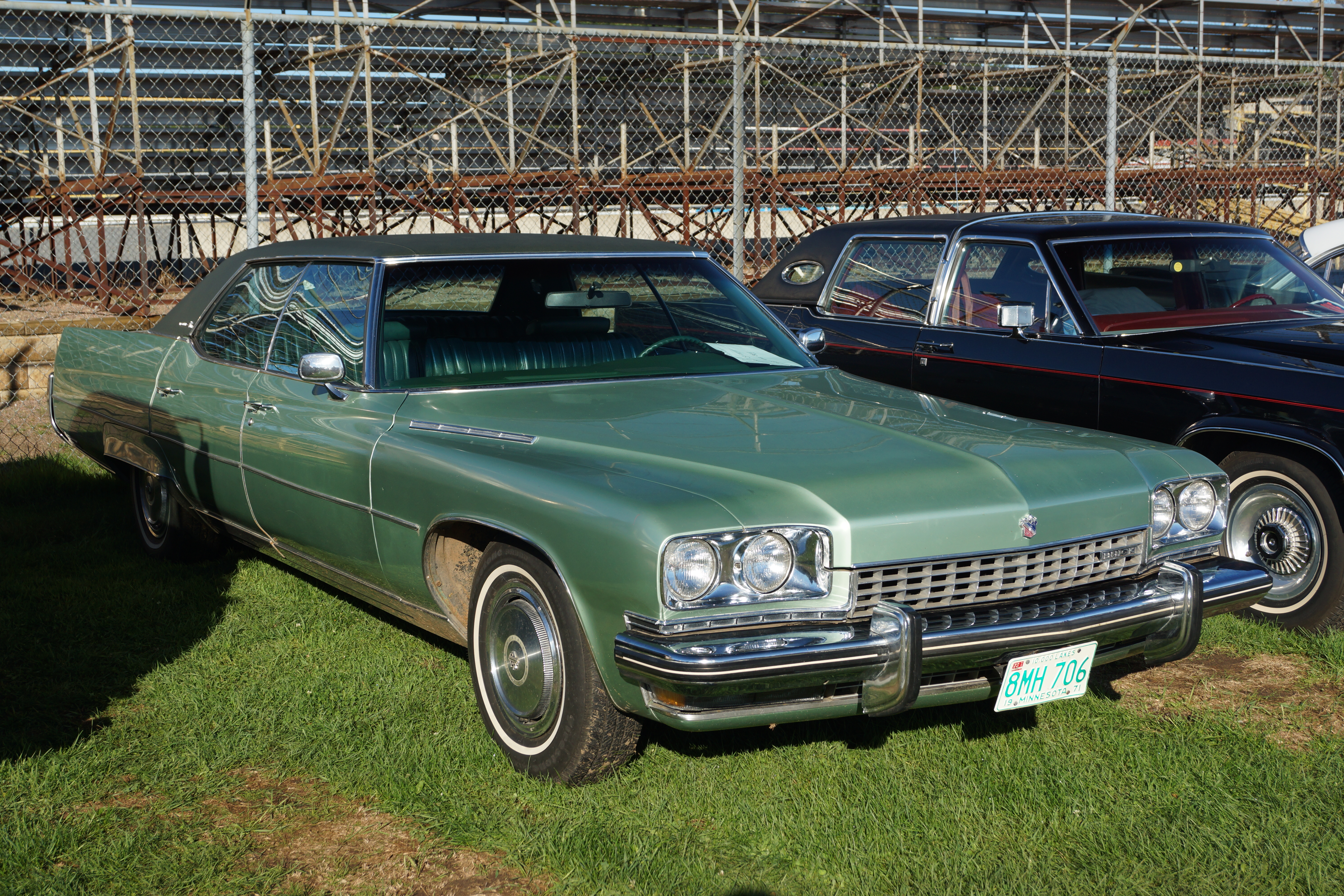
1973 Buick Electra 225 Limited

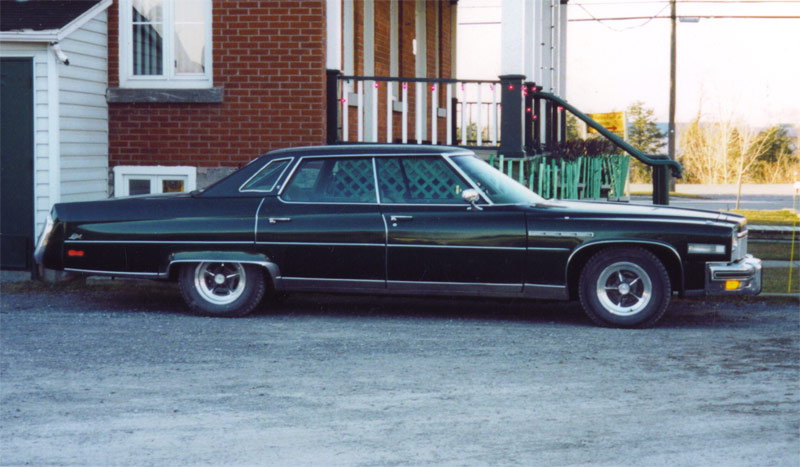
1975 Buick Electra 225 Limited

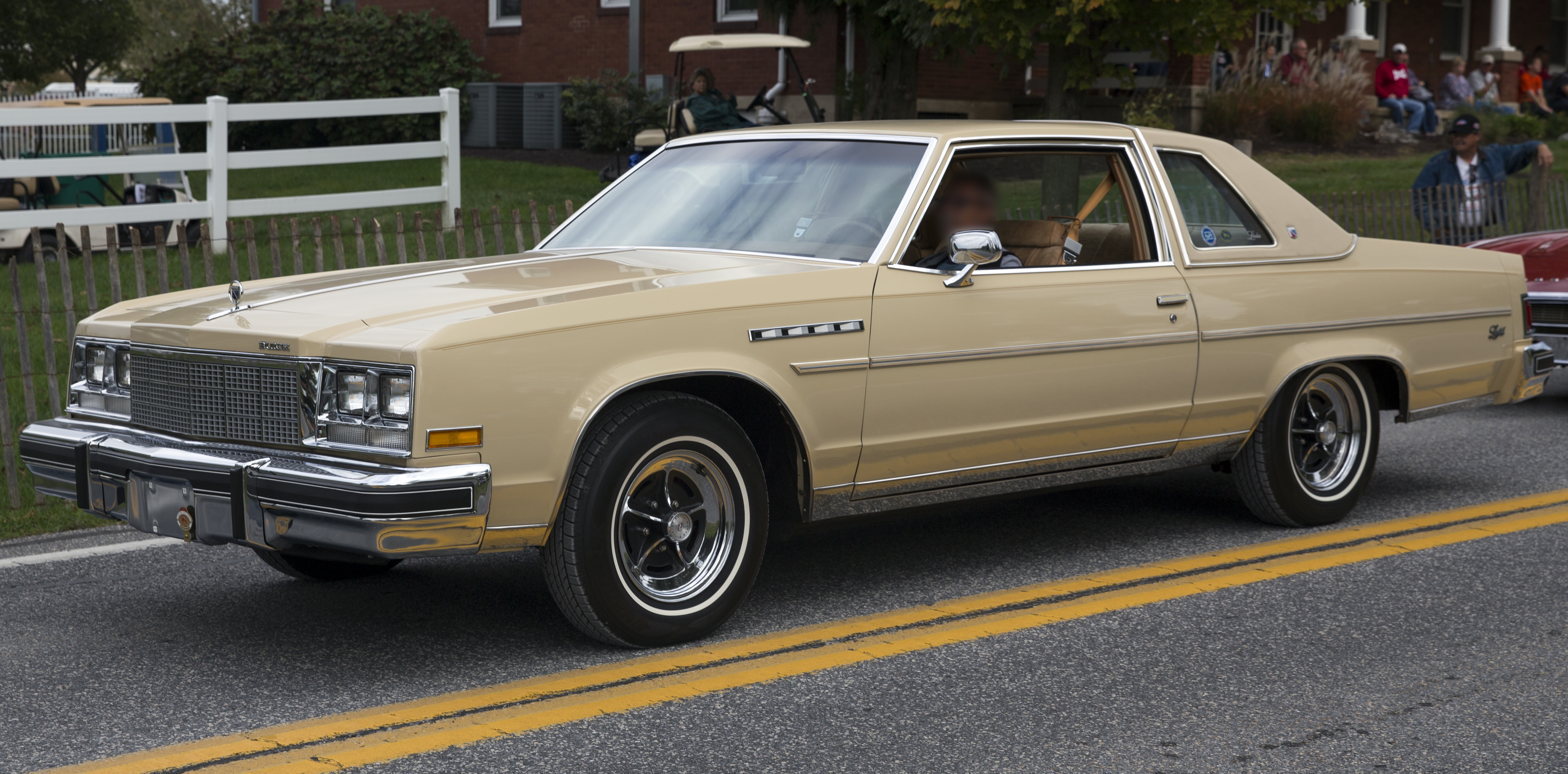
1979 Buick Electra Limited Landau Coupe

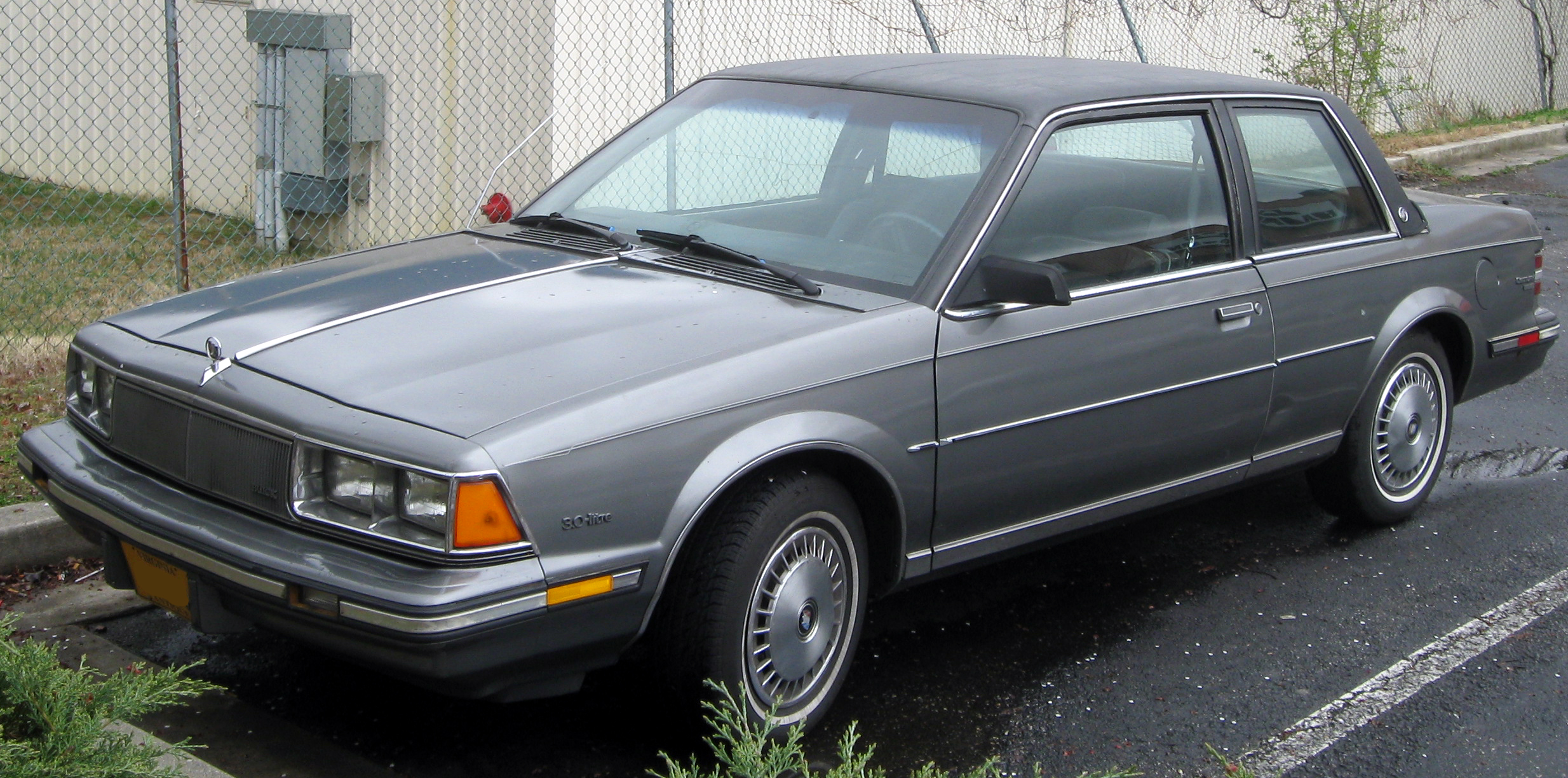
1985 Buick Century Limited

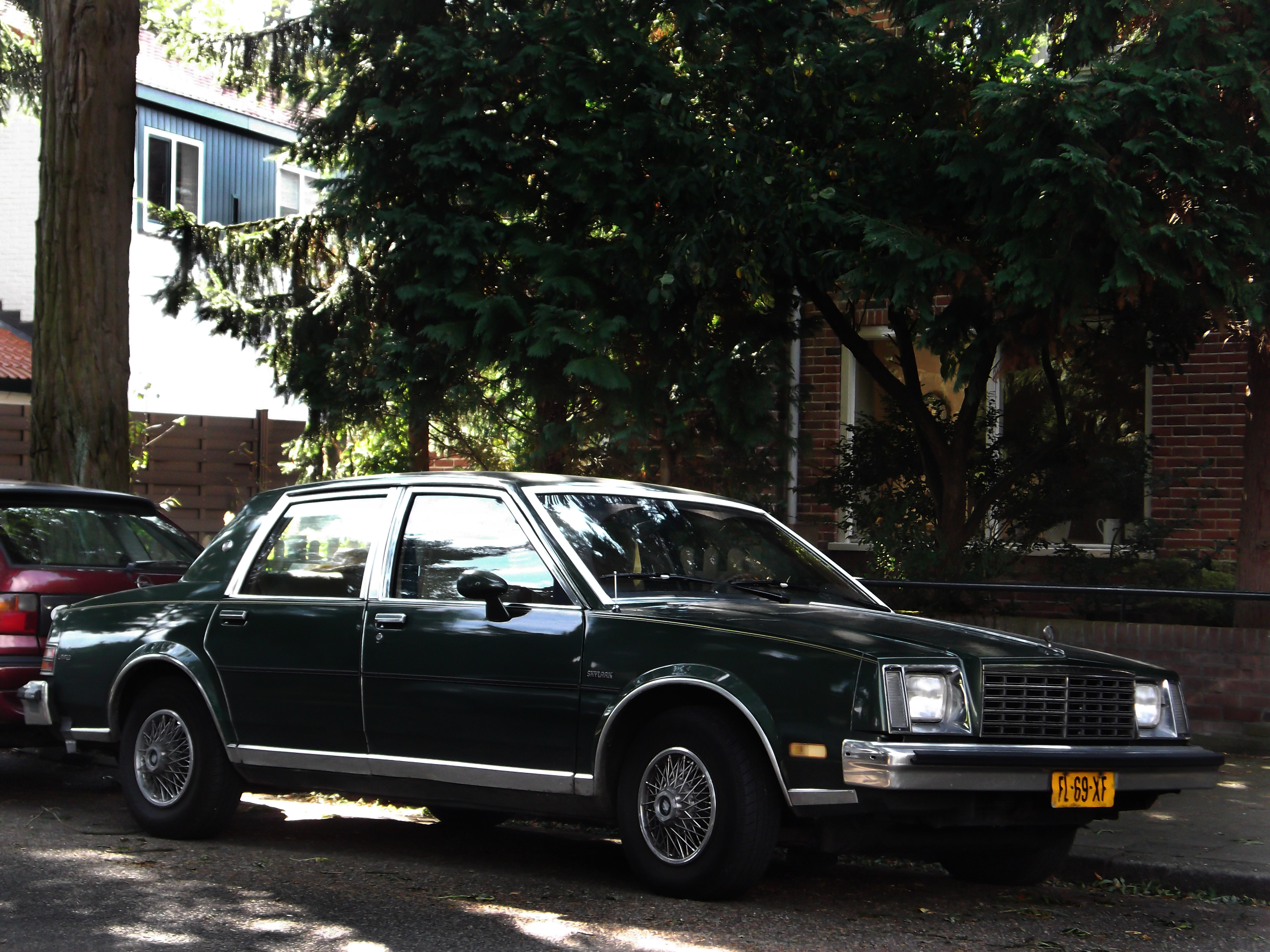
1985 Buick Skylark Limited

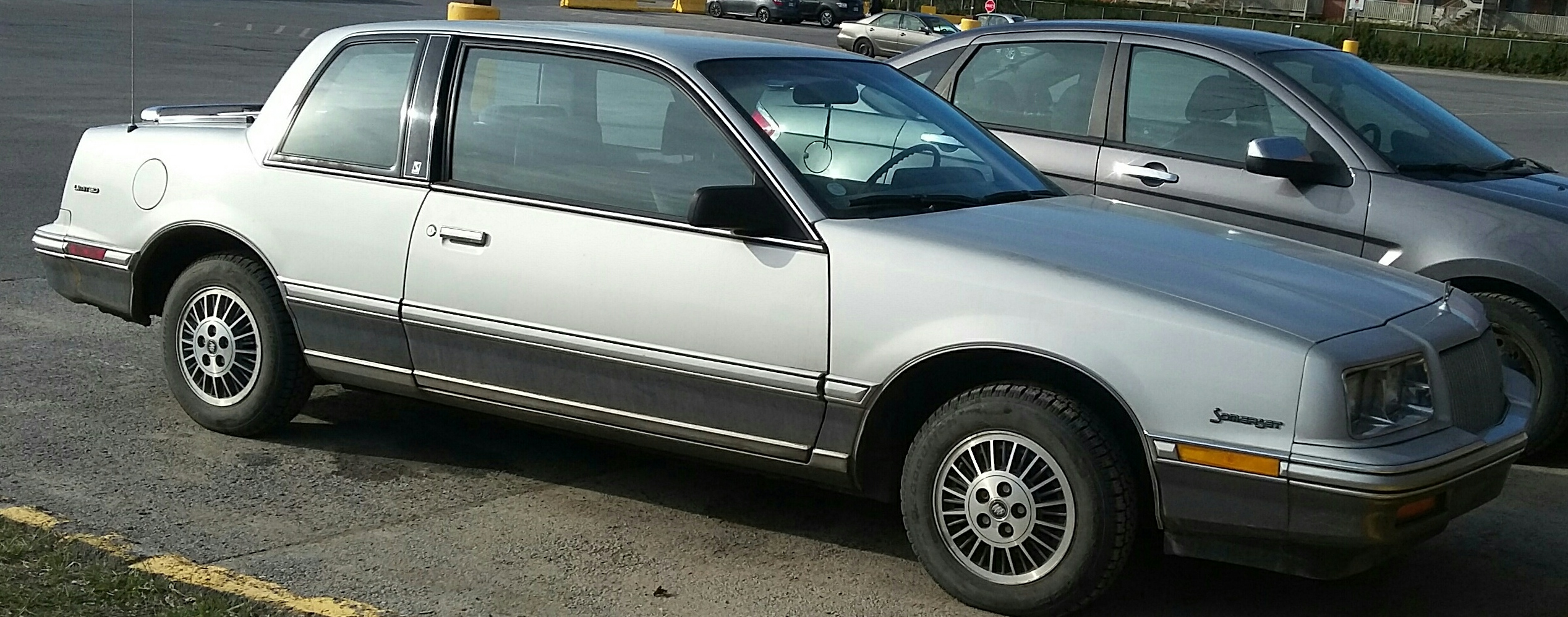
1986 Buick Somerset Limited

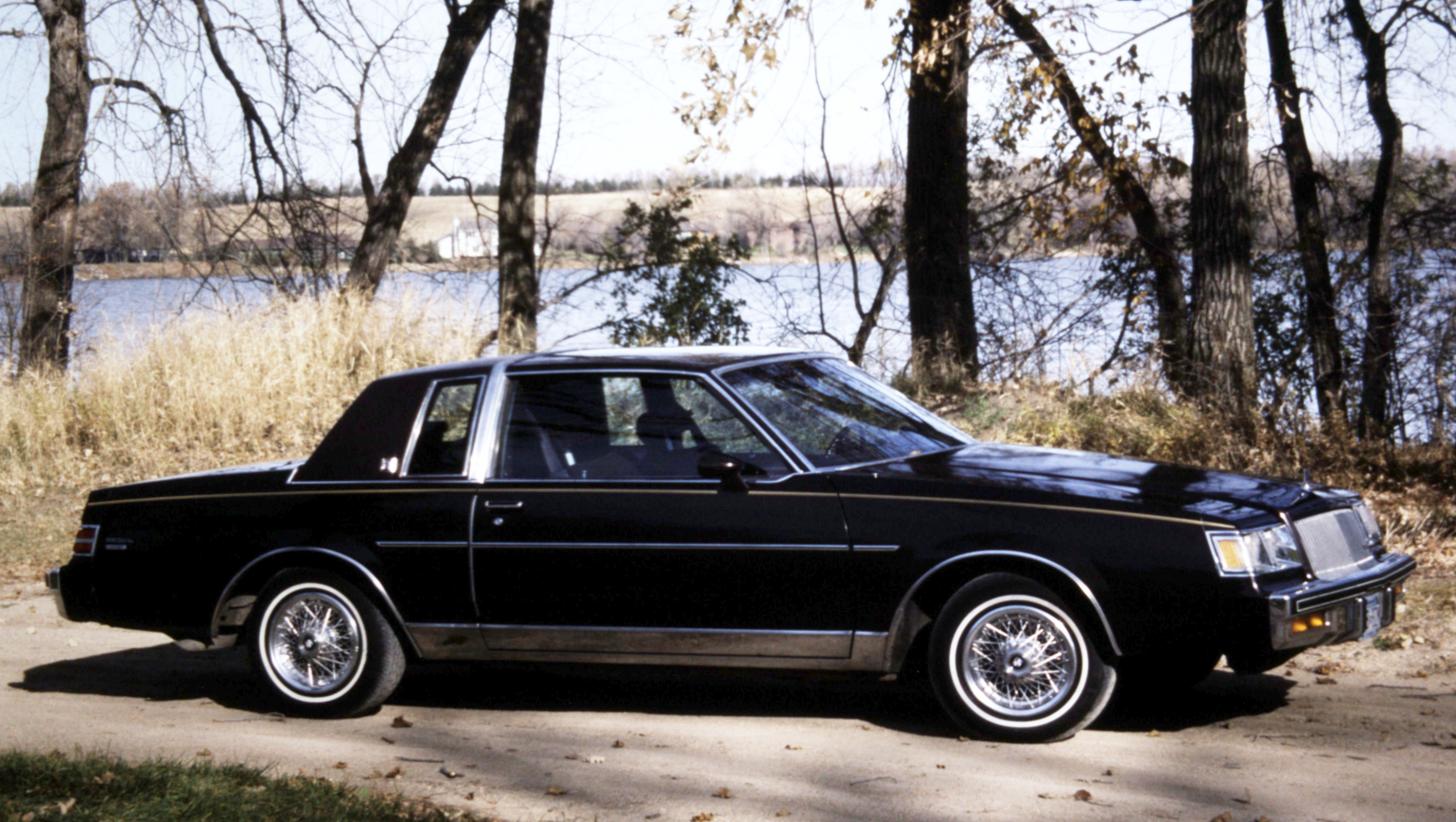
1987 Buick Regal Limited

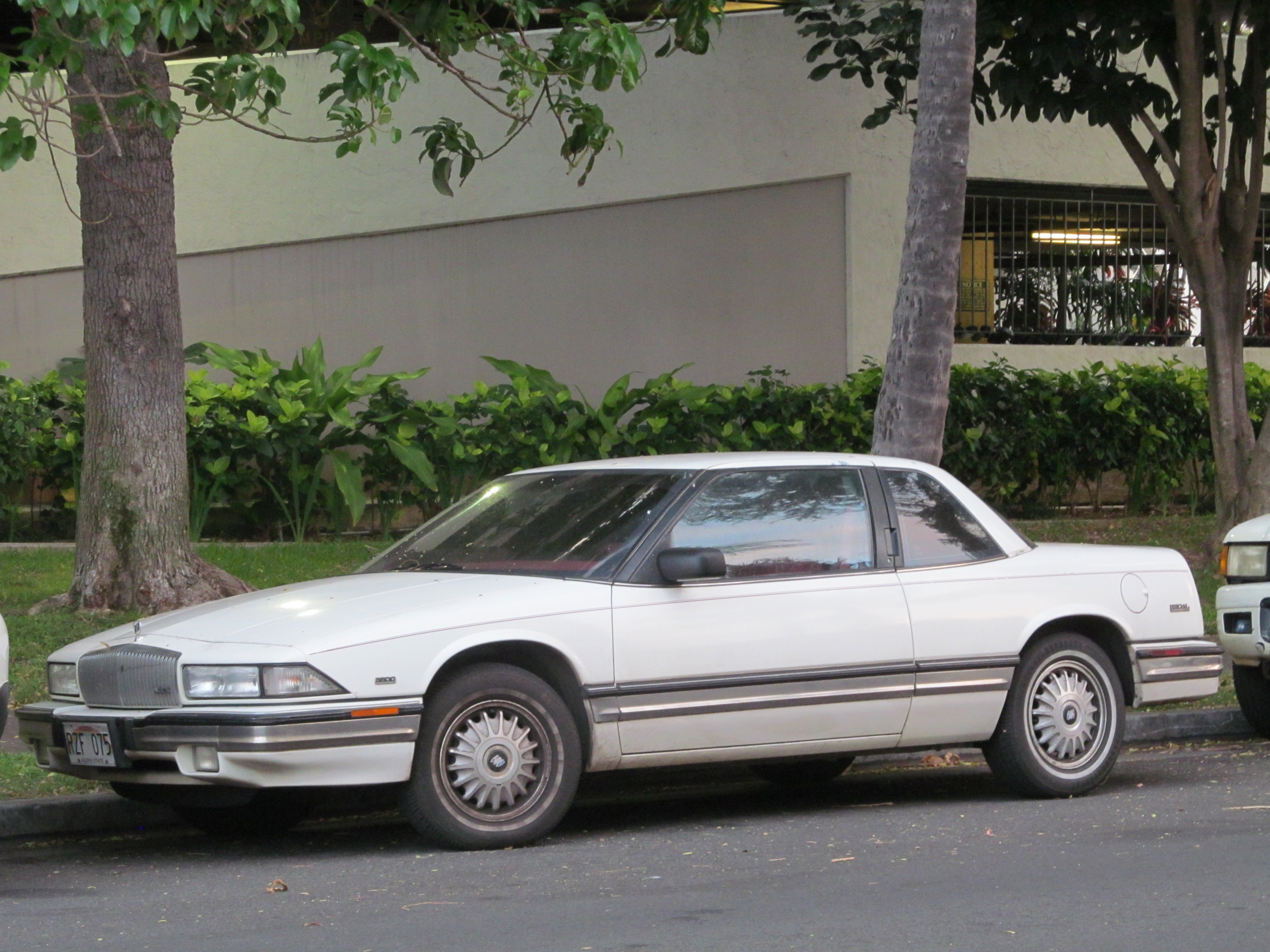
1991 Buick Regal Limited

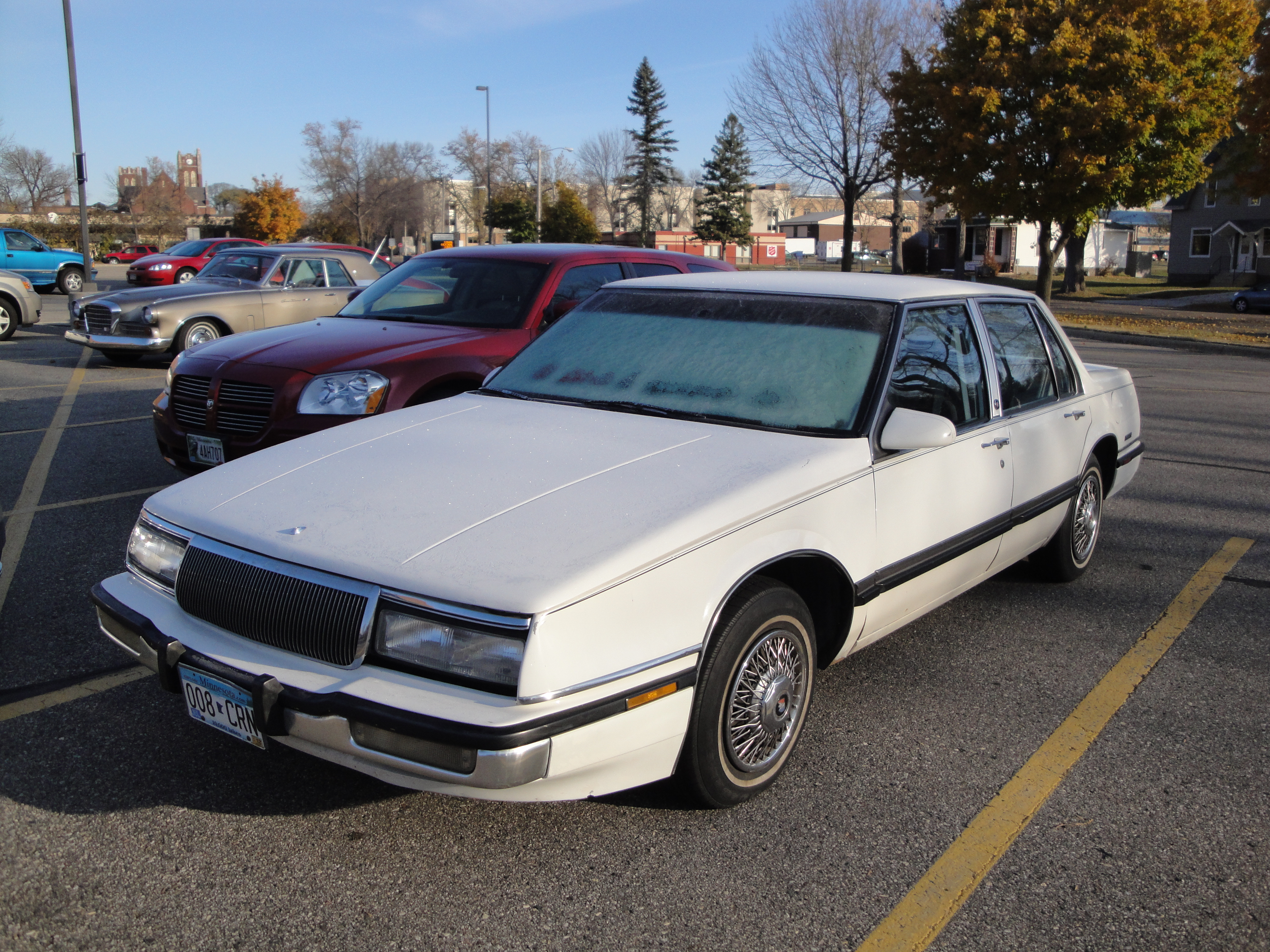
1992 Buick LeSabre Limited

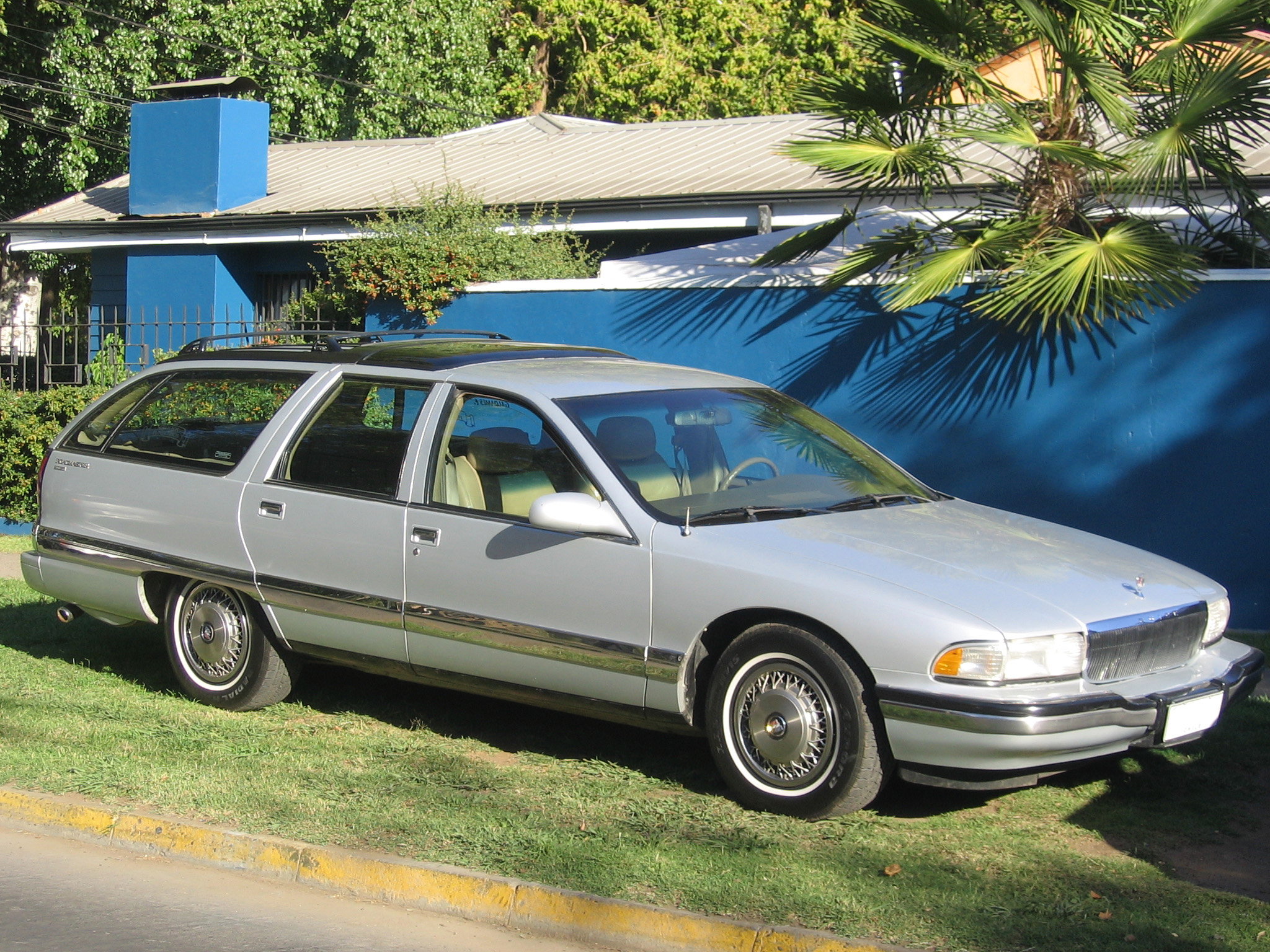
1996 Buick Roadmaster Estate Limited

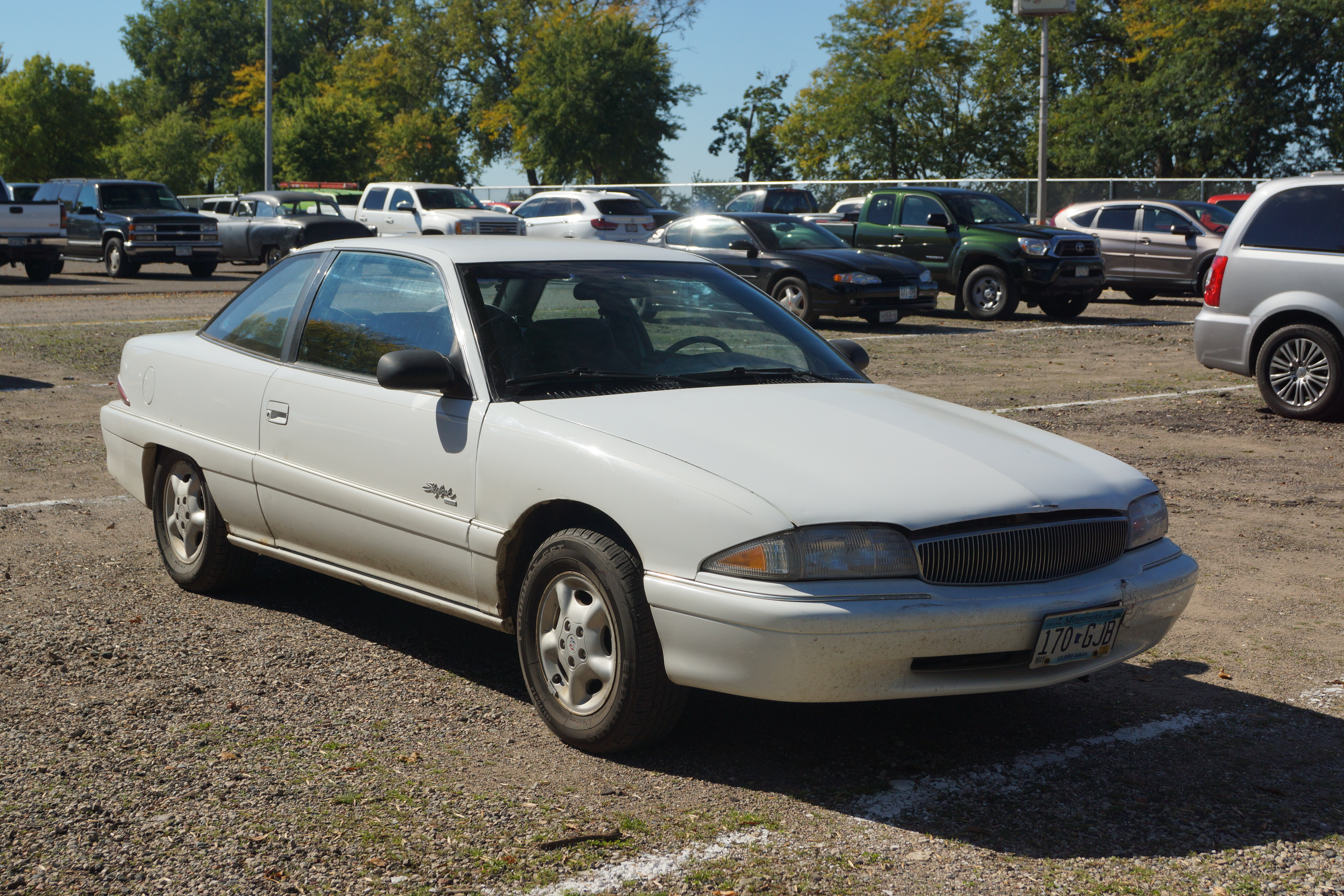
1997 Buick Skylark Limited

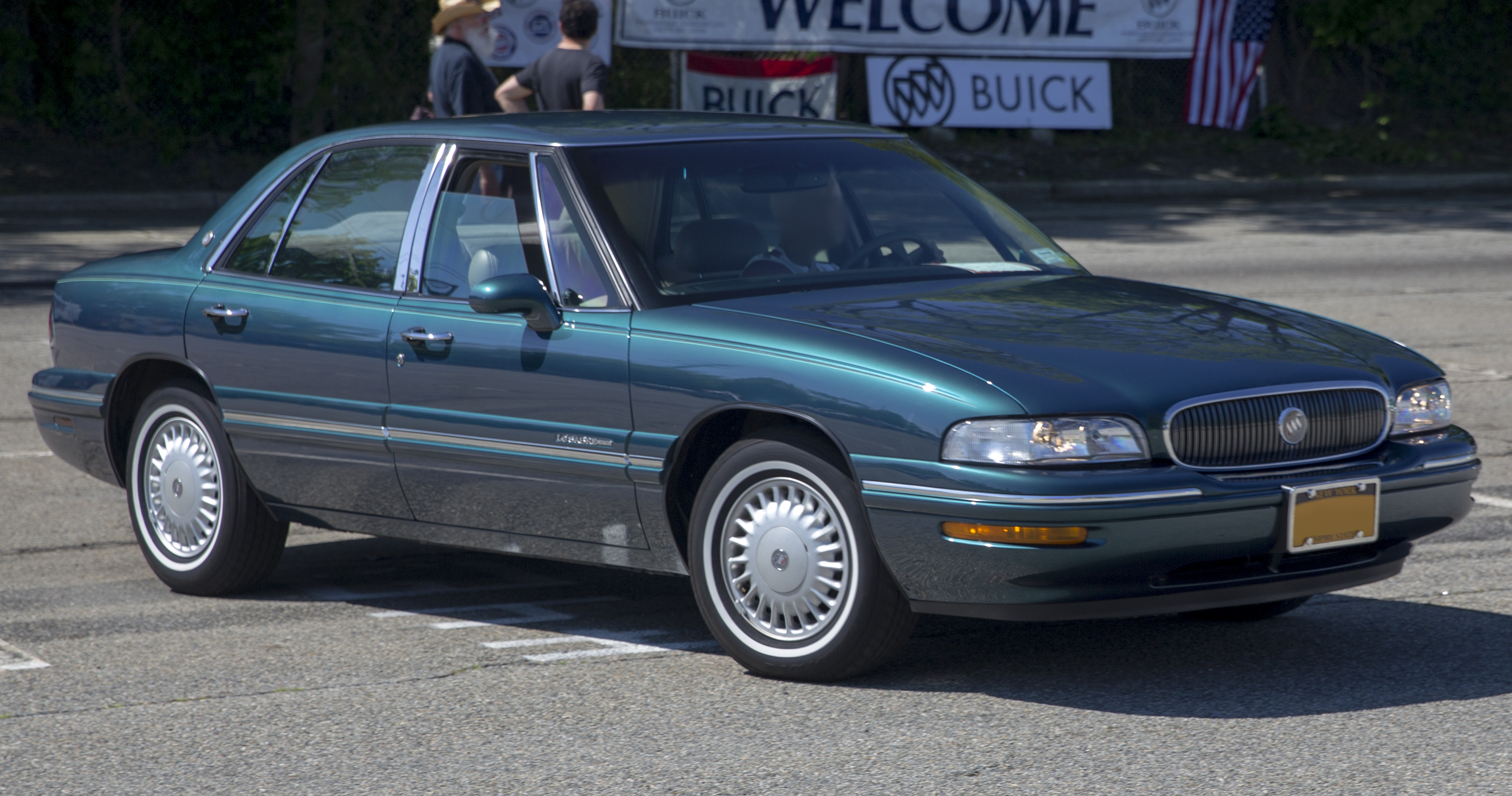
1998 Buick LeSabre Limited

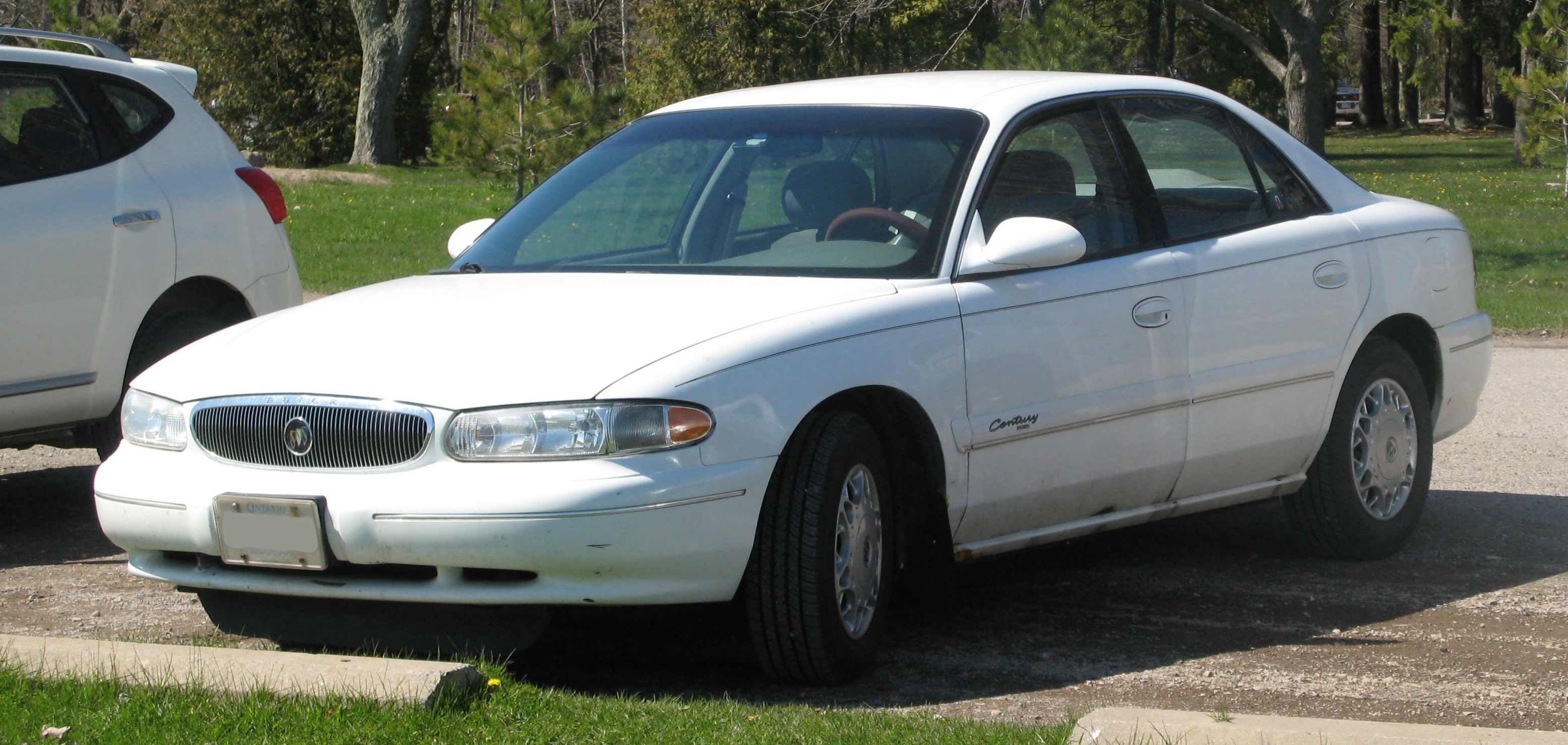
1999 Buick Century Limited
