= Buick straight-6 engine =

Buick straight-6

Overview
- Manufacturer: Buick
- Production: 1914-1930

Layout
- Configuration: Naturally aspirated Straight-6
- Displacement: 191–331 cu in (3.1–5.4 L)
- Valvetrain: OHV

Combustion
- Fuel system: Carburetor
- Fuel type: Gasoline
- Cooling system: Water-cooled

Chronology
- Successor: Buick straight-8 engine

The Buick straight 6 was an overhead valve (OHV) straight-six cylinder automobile engine manufactured by Buick from 1914 to 1930. Produced in displacements from 191 to 331 cu in (3.1 to 5.4 L), it was initially used exclusively in the Buick Six platform, later in the Buick Master Six and Buick Standard Six. It continued Buick's tradition of almost exclusively using OHV engines since the Model B in 1904. A total of 11 displacement and bore-and-stroke combinations were produced, starting with a 331 cu in (5.4 L) produced from 1914-1916.

The 311 cu in (5.1 L) engine was cast with three pairs of siamesed (3x2) cylinders, and combined its starter and generator in a single unit. The 224 cu in (3.7 L) and 242 cu in (4.0 L) versions had all 6 cylinders in a single casting. All three of these engines lacked a separate cylinder head, with the cylinders and valves combined in a single unit and pistons accessible via the bottom of the unit (colloquially called a "jughead" engine, since the jugs (cylinders) came off with the head). Beginning in 1924 all engines had a removable head. In 1925, Buick dropped its inline-4 cylinder powered Buick Four, replaced by the lower priced Buick Standard Six in 191 cu in (3.1 L) and 207 cu in (3.4 L) displacement through 1928. The high-end Buick Master Six series produced from 1925 to 1928 was a continuation of the earlier 6 cylinder lineup and used the 255 cu in (4.2 L) and 274 cu in (4.5 L) engines. The Buick Straight-8 engine introduced in 1931 replaced the straight 6 in all models upon its debut, and was the basis of the Holden straight-six motor.

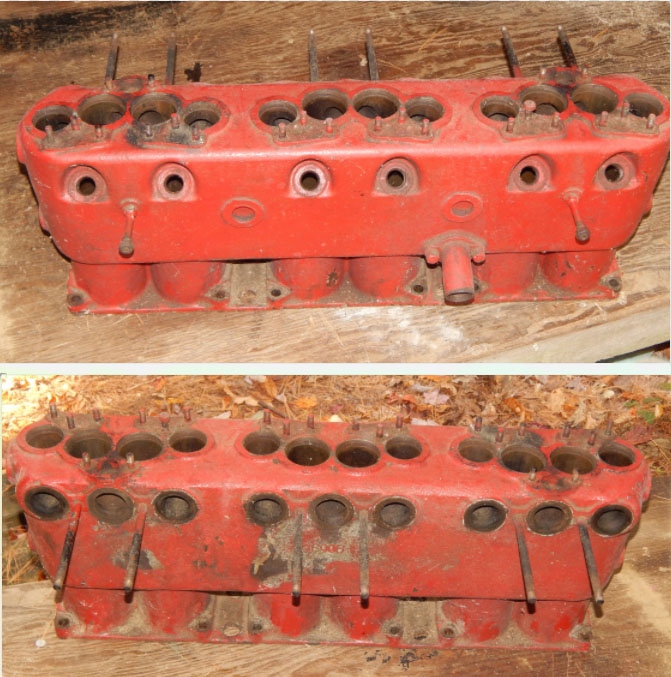
1918 Buick jughead, cylinder block with non-removable head. Top photo: right side of engine; the 6 holes on the side are for spark plugs, 12 holes on top are for intake and exhaust valve cages. Bottom photo: left side of engine; the 9 holes on the side are exhaust and intake manifold ports, the central hole of each threesome being intake.

Production	Engine	Displacement	Bore × Stroke
1914–1916	331	331 cu in (5.4 L)	3.75 in × 5 in (95 mm × 127 mm)
1916–1917	224	225 cu in (3.7 L)	3.25 in × 4.5 in (83 mm × 114 mm)
1917–1923	242	242 cu in (4.0 L)	3.375 in × 4.5 in (85.7 mm × 114.3 mm)
1924–1925	255	255 cu in (4.2 L)	3.375 in × 4.75 in (85.7 mm × 120.7 mm)
1925	191	191 cu in (3.1 L)	3 in × 4.5 in (76 mm × 114 mm)
1926–1928	207	207 cu in (3.4 L)	3.125 in × 4.5 in (79.4 mm × 114.3 mm)
1926–1928	274	274 cu in (4.5 L)	3.5 in × 4.75 in (89 mm × 121 mm)
1929	239	239.1 cu in (3.9 L)	3.3125 in × 4.625 in (84.14 mm × 117.48 mm)
1929	309	309.6 cu in (5.1 L)	3.625 in × 5 in (92.1 mm × 127.0 mm)
1930	257.5	257.5 cu in (4.2 L)	3.4375 in × 4.625 in (87.31 mm × 117.48 mm)
1930	331.4	331.4 cu in (5.4 L)	3.75 in × 5 in (95 mm × 127 mm)

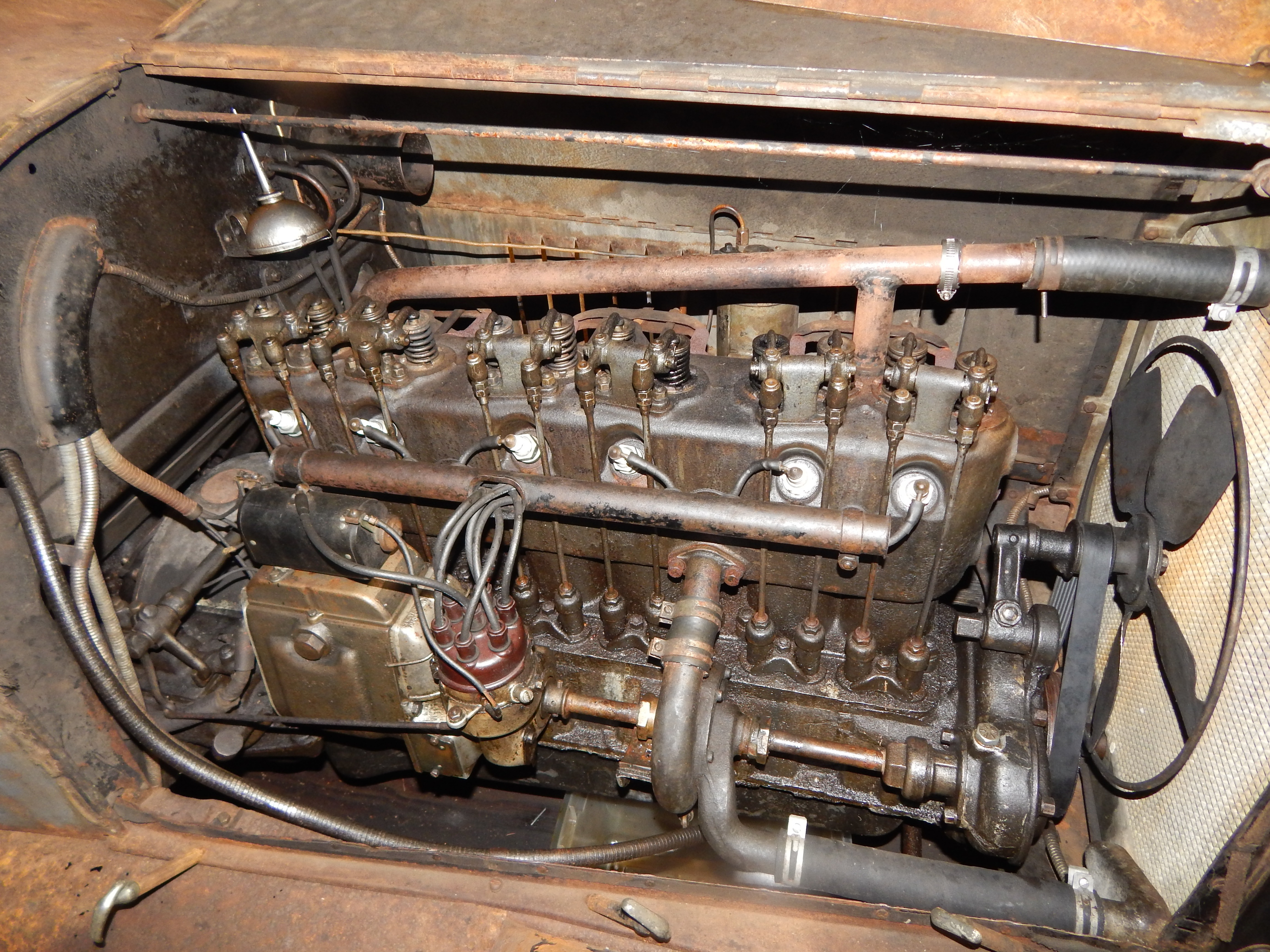
1918 Buick 242 engine, right side.

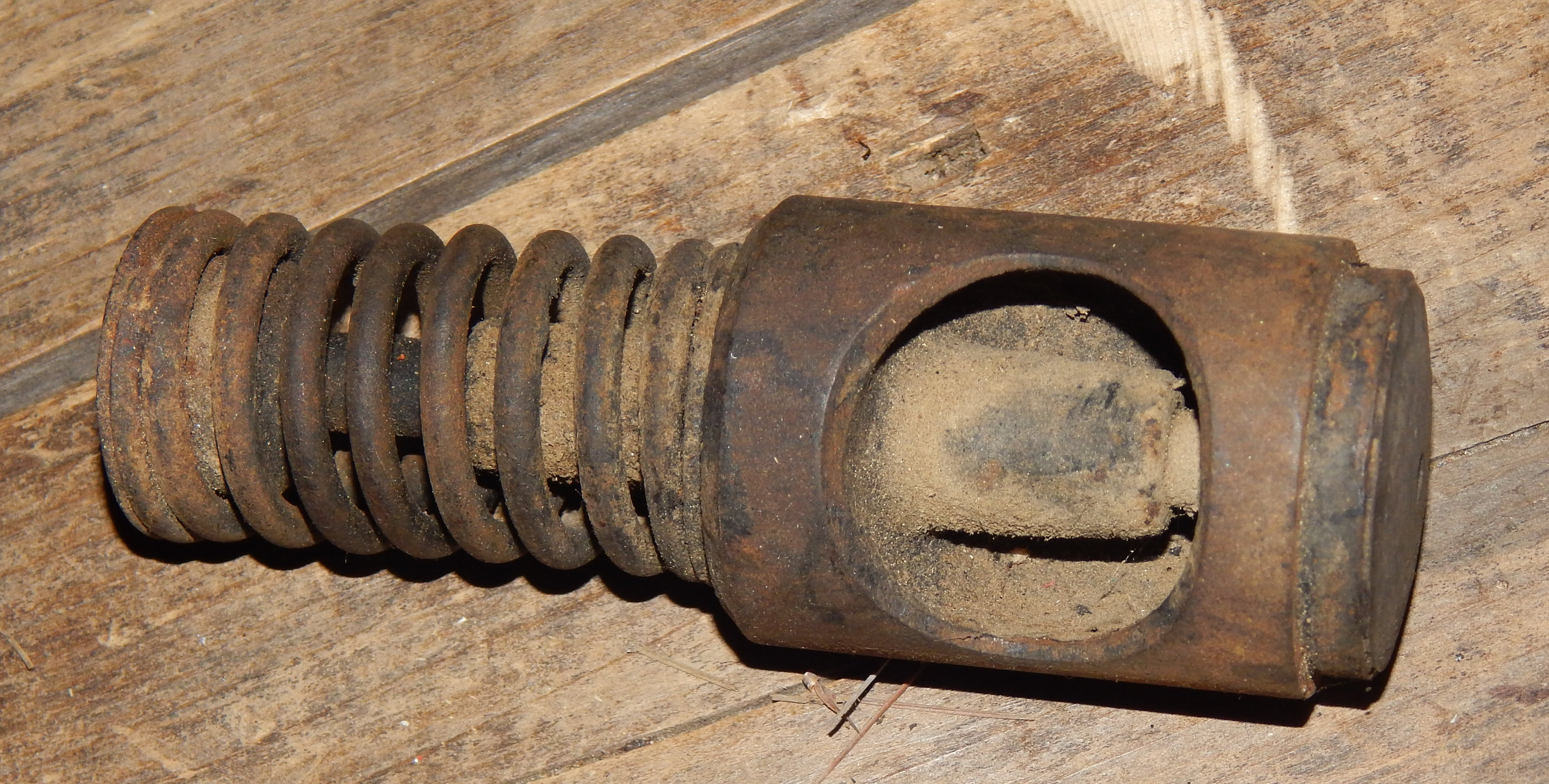
1918 Buick valve cage
