= Buick Six =

Car model

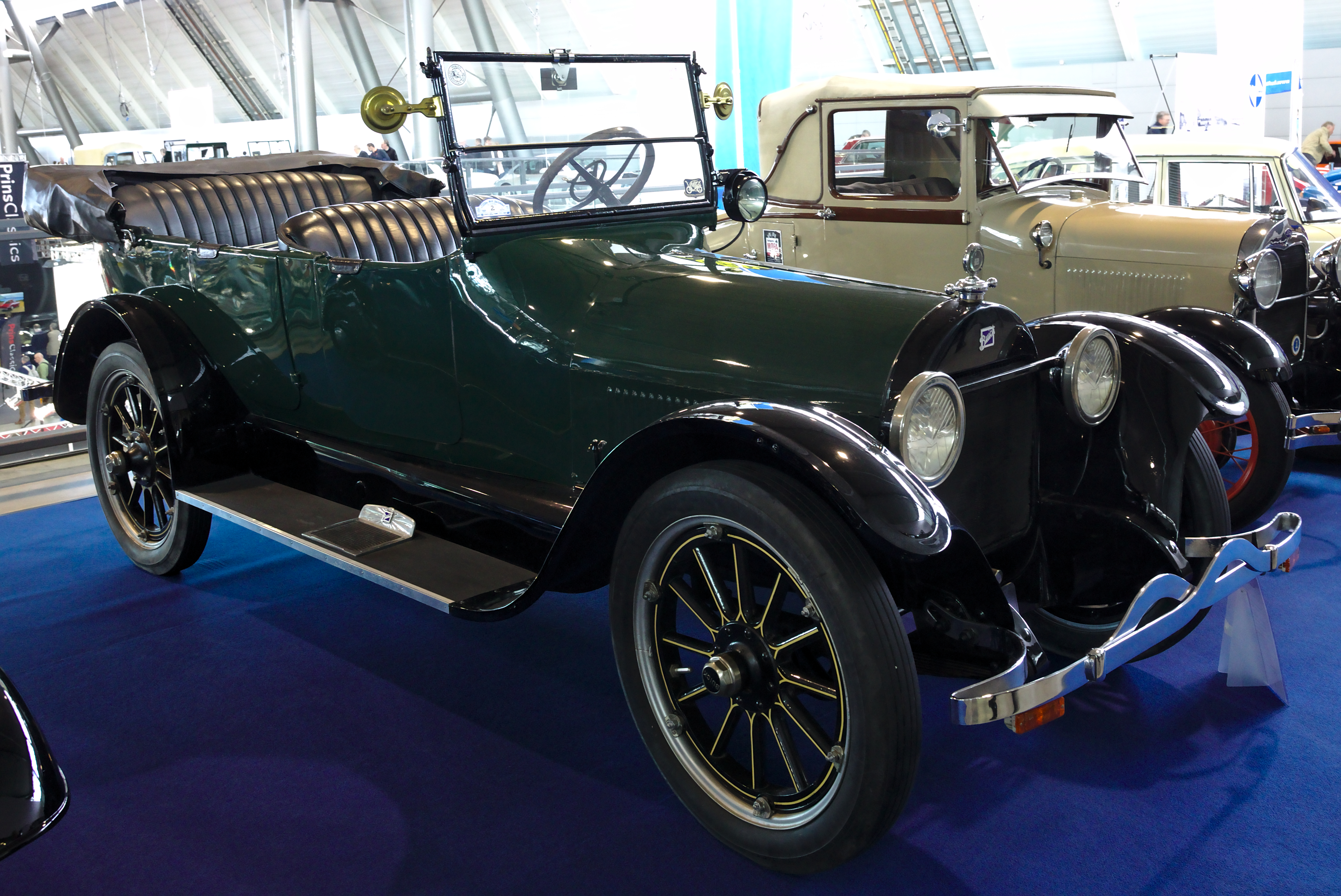
- 1918 Buick Six Series E-45 Touring Sedan

Overview
- Manufacturer: Buick (General Motors)
- Model years: 1914–1931
- Assembly: United States: Flint, Michigan (Buick City)

Body and chassis
- Class: Full-size car
- Layout: Front-engine, rear-wheel-drive
- Related: McLaughlin-Buick

Powertrain
- Engine: 191 cu in (3.1 L) Buick Straight-6 engine OHV I6; 224 cu in (3.7 L) Buick Straight-6 engine OHV I6; 242 cu in (4.0 L) Buick Straight-6 engine OHV I6; 255 cu in (4.2 L) Buick Straight-6 engine OHV I6; 331 cu in (5.4 L) Buick Straight-6 engine OHV I6
- Transmission: 3-speed synchromesh manual

Dimensions
- Wheelbase: 115 in (2,921 mm); 118 in (2,997 mm); 120 in (3,048 mm); 124 in (3,150 mm); 130 in (3,302 mm)

Chronology
- Successor: Buick Master Six; Buick Standard Six

The Buick Six is a luxury automobile that was produced by General Motors' Buick division from 1914 to 1931. It was the senior vehicle to the Buick Series B Four. It used a new platform which was shared with the Oldsmobile Six and was the first Buick to implement a steering wheel on the left side, and electric starter provided by Delco Remy along with an electric lighting system and electric Klaxon horn. The gearshift and emergency brake were relocated to a central position inside the vehicle, an approach used on all GM products for 1914. It continued to use the patented overhead valve engine implemented by Walter Lorenzo Marr while the cylinder head was not removable until later developments. The engine displacement was 331 cu in (5.4 L) and the wheelbase was 130 in (3,302 mm). The first year Buick Six was only offered as a touring sedan for US$1,985 ($58,731 in 2025 dollars).

The various body styles were supplied by Fisher Body of Detroit, MI. In 1925, it was updated with both the Buick Master Six and the Buick Standard Six when the four-cylinder engine platform was cancelled. During this time period, Oldsmobile introduced the Light Eight, sourced and shared from the Cadillac Type 51 while Buick chose to stay with the smooth running six-cylinder engine, while Cadillac didn't offer a six-cylinder engine till several decades later. Buick was the only GM product to use the exclusive overhead valve engine however. Chevrolet didn't become a division until 1918. The list of available body styles was extensive, listing 14 different choices. The top level choice for 1925 was the 7 passenger Town Car for US$2,925 ($53,699 in 2025 dollars).

== See also ==
- Cadillac Type 51
- Oldsmobile Six
- Oakland Six
- Chevrolet Series FA
- "From a Buick 6," a song by Bob Dylan that references the car in the title
