= Buick Standard Six =

Car model

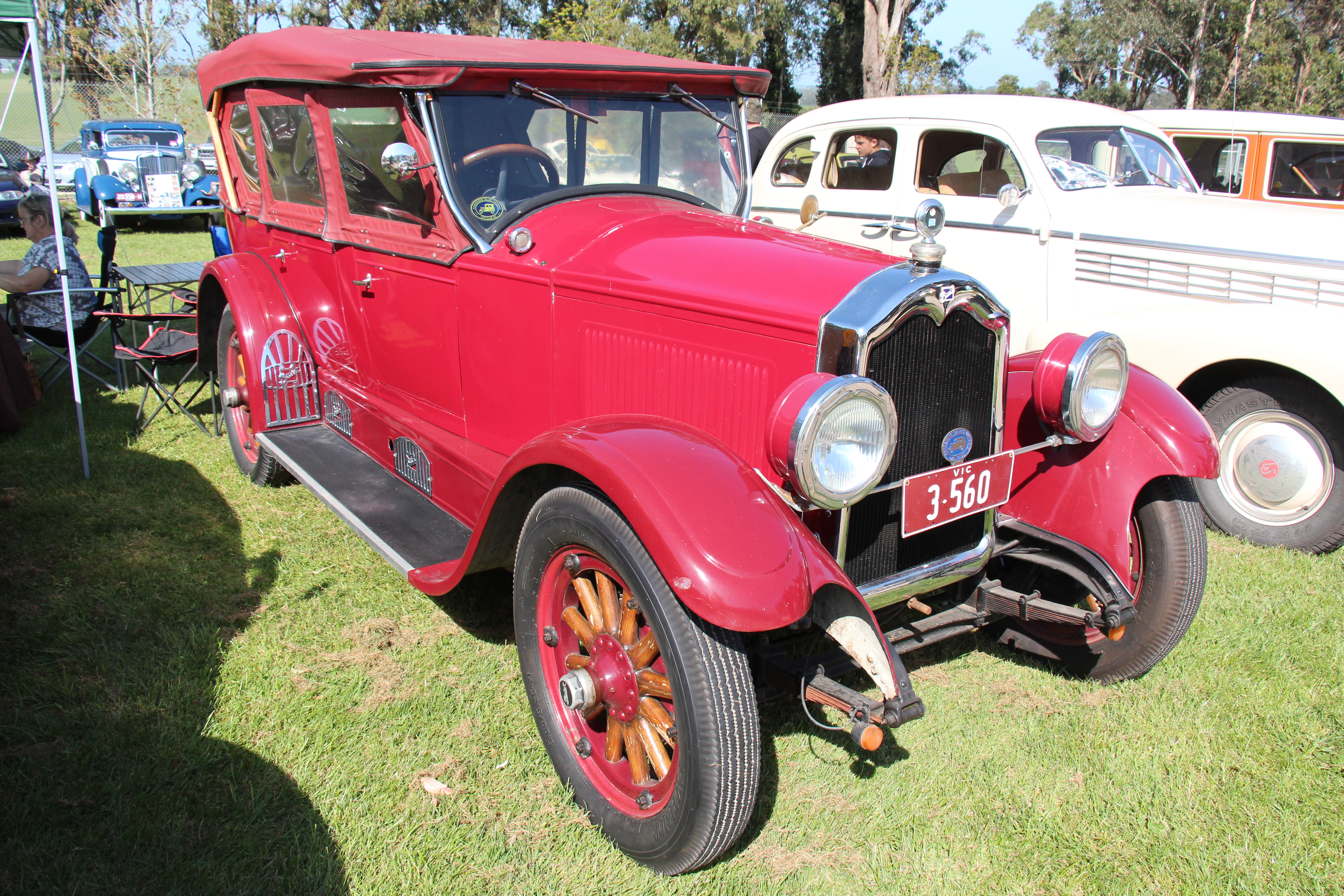
- 1925 Buick Standard Six

Overview
- Manufacturer: Buick (General Motors)
- Model years: 1925-1928
- Assembly: United States: Flint, Michigan (Buick City)

Body and chassis
- Layout: Front-engine, rear-wheel-drive
- Platform: GM A platform
- Related: McLaughlin-Buick

Powertrain
- Engine: 191 cu in (3.1 L) Buick Straight-6 engine OHV I6; 207 cu in (3.4 L) Buick Straight-6 engine OHV I6; 239.1 cu in (3.9 L) Buick Straight-6 engine OHV I6
- Transmission: 3-speed synchromesh manual

Dimensions
- Wheelbase: 114.5 in (2,908 mm)

Chronology
- Predecessor: Buick Six
- Successor: Buick Series 40; Buick Series 50

The Buick Standard Six Series 20 was an automobile produced by Buick between 1925 and 1928. Powered by the overhead valve (OHV) Buick straight-6 engine, it was the junior model to the Buick Master Six, and shared the GM A platform with Oldsmobile, Oakland and Chevrolet. The Standard Six evolved from the earlier Buick Six when the Buick 4-cylinder was cancelled.

The Standard Six was the most popular Buick sold while being more upscale to the Oldsmobile Six. It was the senior brand to Marquette under the General Motors Companion Make Program until Marquette was cancelled one year later. It replaced the earlier Buick Six that was introduced in 1916, and was replaced with the Buick Series 50. Coachwork continued to be offered by Fisher Body, which was the primary supplier of all GM products at this time, and its Duco automotive lacquer paint, introduced by DuPont was the first quick drying multi-color line of nitrocellulose lacquers made especially for the automotive industry. The Series 20 was manufactured at what would later become known as the Buick City factory on Hamilton Ave. in Flint, Michigan.

== Buick Standard Six specifications (1926 data) ==
- Color – Brewster green
- Seating Capacity – Five
- Wheelbase – 114.5 inches
- Wheels - Wood
- Tires - 31” × 4.95” balloon
- Service Brakes - contracting on four wheels
- Emergency Brakes - expanding on rear wheels
- Engine - Six cylinder, vertical, cast en bloc, 3 × 4½ inches; head removable; valves in head; H.P. 21.6 N.A.C.C. rating
- Lubrication – Force feed
- Crankshaft - Four bearing
- Radiator – Cellular
- Cooling – Water pump
- Ignition – High tension generator and storage battery
- Starting System – Single Unit
- Voltage – Six to eight
- Wiring System – Single
- Gasoline System – Vacuum
- Clutch – Dry plate, multiple disc
- Transmission – Selective sliding
- Gear Changes – 3 forward, 1 reverse
- Drive – Spiral bevel
- Rear Springs – Cantilever
- Rear Axle – Three-quarters floating
- Steering Gear – Worm and nut

=== Standard equipment ===
New car price included the following items:

- tools
- jack
- speedometer
- ammeter
- electric horn
- transmission theft lock
- automatic windshield cleaner
- spare tire carrier with extra demountable rim
- rear view mirror
- gasoline tank gauge
- parking lights on cowl
- headlight dimmers
- tail lamp
- instrument board lamp
- pressure grease gun
- windshield type ventilator
- dome light
- foot rest
- rear window curtain and sunshade

=== Prices ===
New car prices were F.O.B. factory, plus Tax:

- Five Passenger Coach - $1295 ($23,551 in 2025 dollars)
- Five Passenger Double Service Sedan - $1475 ($26,824 in 2025 dollars)
- Two Passenger Roadster - $1150 ($20,914 in 2025 dollars)
- Two Passenger Enclosed Roadster - $1190 ($21,641 in 2025 dollars)
- Five Passenger Touring - $1175 ($21,369 in 2025 dollars)
- Five Passenger Enclosed Touring - $1250 ($22,733 in 2025 dollars)
- Two Passenger Double Service Coupé - $1375 ($25,006 in 2025 dollars)
- Five Passenger Sedan - $1665 ($30,280 in 2025 dollars)
- Four Passenger Coupé - $1565 ($28,461 in 2025 dollars)

== See also ==
- Cadillac Type V-63
- Oldsmobile Model 30
- Oakland Six
- Chevrolet Superior
