= Buick straight-8 engine =

Buick straight 8
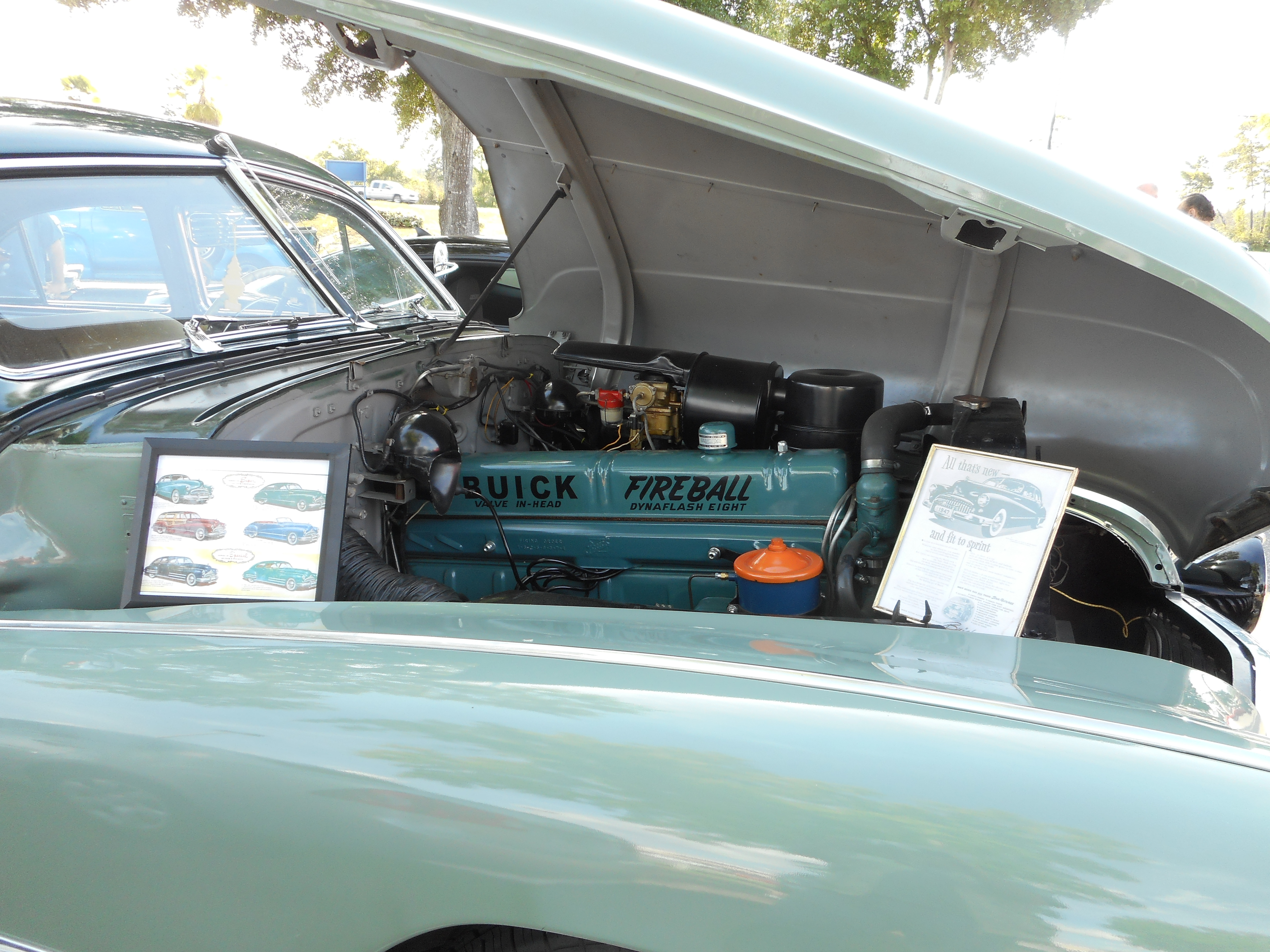

Overview
- Manufacturer: Buick (General Motors)
- Also called: Fireball Eight; Dynaflash
- Production: Buick City: 1931–1953

Layout
- Configuration: Straight-8
- Displacement: 220.7 cu in (3.6 L); 230.4 cu in (3.8 L); 233 cu in (3.8 L); 235.4 cu in (3.9 L); 248.1 cu in (4.1 L); 263.3 cu in (4.3 L); 272.6 cu in (4.5 L); 278.1 cu in (4.6 L); 320.2 cu in (5.2 L); 344.7 cu in (5.6 L)
- Cylinder bore: 2.875 in (73.0 mm); 2.9688 in (75.41 mm); 2.9375 in (74.61 mm); 3.0625 in (77.79 mm); 3.0938 in (78.58 mm); 3.1875 in (80.96 mm); 3.3125 in (84.14 mm); 3.4375 in (87.31 mm)
- Piston stroke: 3.875 in (98.4 mm); 4.125 in (104.8 mm); 4.25 in (108 mm); 4.3125 in (109.54 mm); 4.625 in (117.5 mm); 5 in (127 mm)
- Valvetrain: OHV

Output
- Power output: 120–168 hp (89–125 kW)

Chronology
- Predecessor: Buick straight-6 engine
- Successor: Buick Nailhead V8

The Buick straight-8 engine (Fireball 8) was a straight-eight cylinder automobile engine produced from 1931 to 1953 by the Buick division of General Motors. It replaced the Buick Straight-6 engine across the board in all models on its debut.

== Design ==
Unlike most other car makers at the time, Buick had been using a valve-in-head/OHV overhead valve reverse-flow cylinder head design or I-head since their inception and continued this practice in their straight-eight designs. The engine was sold in different displacements depending on the model of car and the year and was constructed upon two distinct (possibly more) block castings. The engine block in the smaller displacement versions internally resembled the 1937-53 inline Chevrolet 216, 235 & 261" straight six (the combustion chamber design was quite different), albeit with additional cylinders. The large block version (320 cid and 345 cid; used in large-chassis models such as the Roadmaster) was considerably heavier and this weight adversely affected vehicle performance and handling. In earlier years the engines used cast-in-place bearings that were then machined, which made engine rebuilding an expensive procedure, but after 1937 they began using drop-in bearings.

Initial compression ratio varied between 4.5:1 and 4.75:1 in different engines, with 77 bhp (57 kW), 90 bhp (67 kW) and 104 bhp (78 kW) for 221, 273 and 345 engines respectively; when the 320 engine was introduced, it produced 120 bhp (89 kW), increasing to 170 bhp (130 kW) later.

The last year for Buick's straight-eight was 1953, but only in the lower-cost Buick Special. All other lines using the same basic chassis received the new V8 322 cu in (5.3 L) Fireball. Starting in 1954, the Special received the V8 as well.

Production	Engine	Displacement	Bore x Stroke
1931	221	220.7 cu in (3.6 L)	2.875 in × 4.25 in (73.0 mm × 108.0 mm)
1931–1933	273	272.6 cu in (4.5 L)	3.0625 in × 4.625 in (77.79 mm × 117.48 mm)
1931–1935	345	344.7 cu in (5.6 L)	3.3125 in × 5 in (84.14 mm × 127.00 mm)
1932–1933	230	230.4 cu in (3.8 L)	2.9375 in × 4.25 in (74.61 mm × 107.95 mm)
1934–1935	235	235.4 cu in (3.9 L)	2.9688 in × 4.25 in (75.41 mm × 107.95 mm)
1934–1935	278	278.1 cu in (4.6 L)	3.0938 in × 4.625 in (78.58 mm × 117.48 mm)
1934–1936	233	233.0 cu in (3.8 L)	3.0938 in × 3.875 in (78.58 mm × 98.43 mm)
1936–1952	320	320.2 cu in (5.2 L)	3.4375 in × 4.3125 in (87.31 mm × 109.54 mm)
1937–1950	248	248.1 cu in (4.1 L)	3.0938 in × 4.125 in (78.58 mm × 104.78 mm)
1950–1953	263	263.3 cu in (4.3 L)	3.1875 in × 4.125 in (80.96 mm × 104.78 mm)

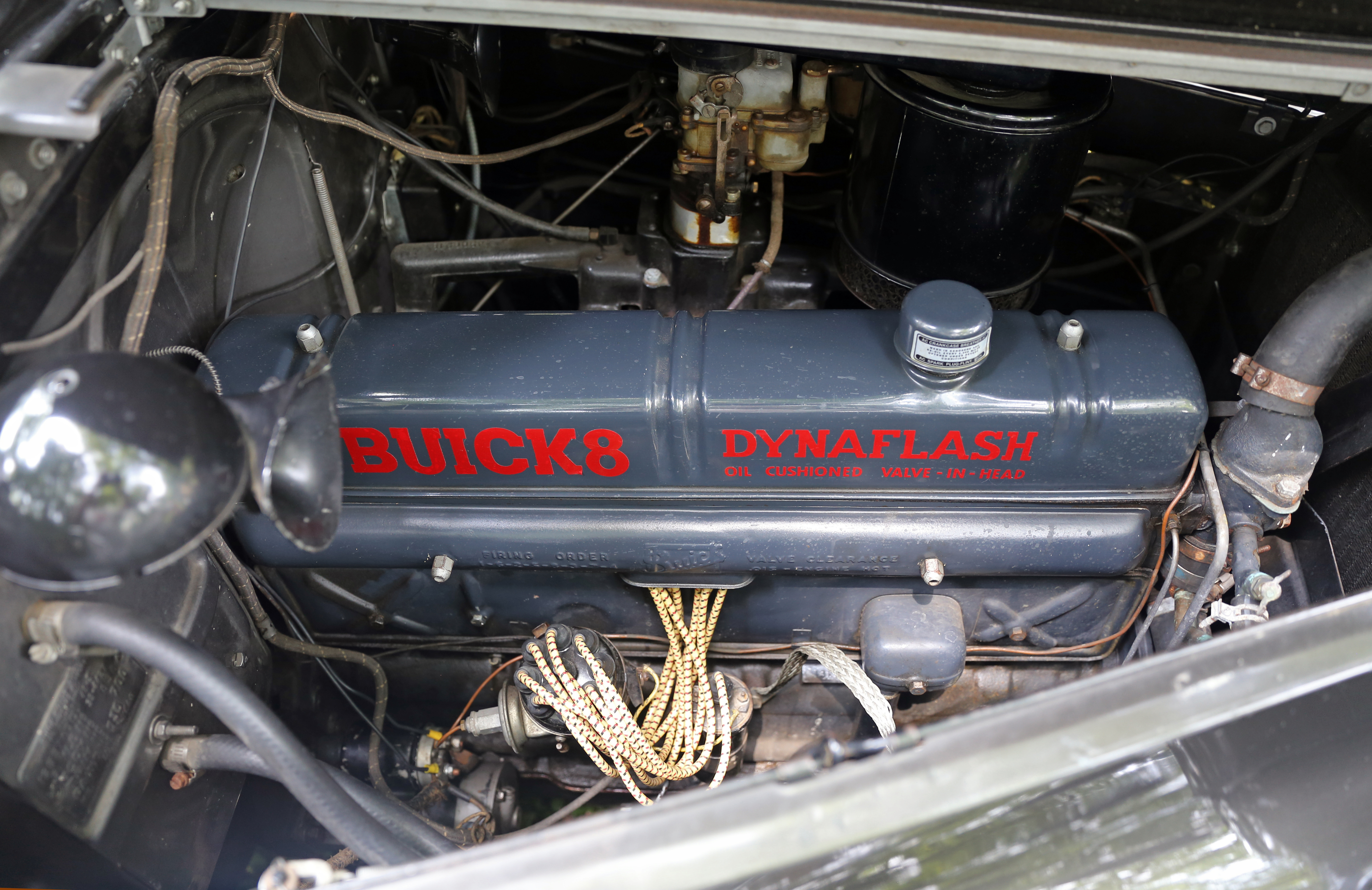
1939 iteration ("Dynaflash") in a Series 40 Special, 248 cu in (4.1 L)

1952 Production Engines and Ratings
Series	Engine	Displacement	Bore x Stroke	Power
40	263	263.3 cu in (4.3 L)	3 3/16 in × 4 1/8 in (81.0 mm × 104.8 mm)	120 hp (89 kW) at 3600 rpm
50	263	263.3 cu in (4.3 L)	3 3/16 in × 4 1/8 in (81.0 mm × 104.8 mm)	124 hp (92 kW) at 3600 rpm
70	320	320.2 cu in (5.2 L)	3 7/16 in × 4 5/16 in (87.3 mm × 109.5 mm)	168 hp (125 kW) at 3800 rpm
Note: The 320 has a head length of 341/2" while the smaller engines are 311/4" long.

== See also ==
- Buick V8 engine
- Buick V6 engine
- Buick Straight-6 engine
- List of GM engines
