= List of GM engines =

Coordinates: 42.6623635°N 83.2856193°W

This list of GM engines encompasses all engines manufactured by General Motors and used in its cars.

== Divisions ==
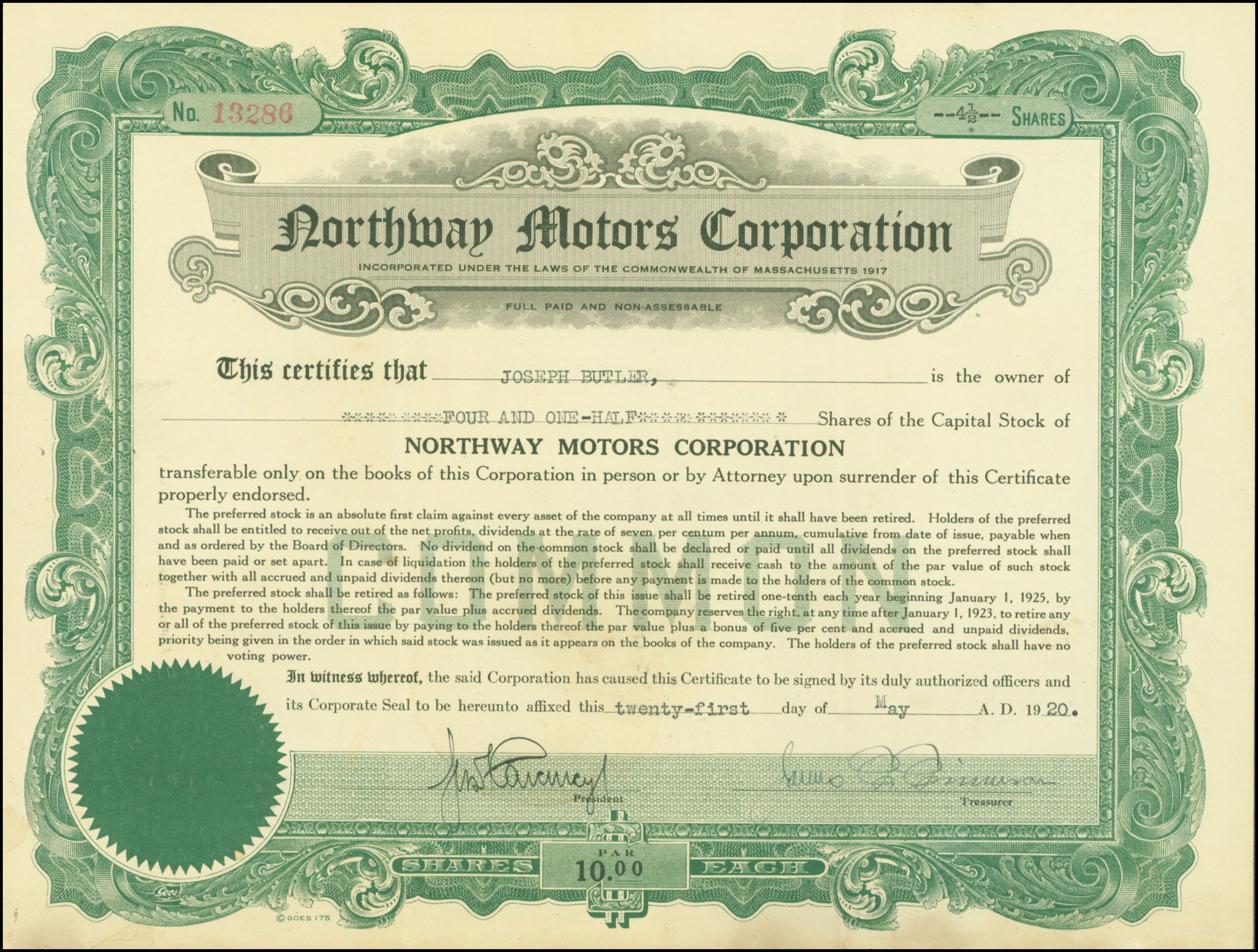
Share of the Northway Motors Corporation, issued 21. May 1920

When General Motors was created in 1908, it started out with Buick and soon after acquired Oldsmobile, Cadillac and Oakland. There were dozens of other smaller companies that William Durant acquired during his first employment term until he was let go due to financially overextending his purchases. He regained control when he brought on Chevrolet in 1917 which was short lived until he was let go for the second time. This meant that the different core brands designed and manufactured their own engines with few interchangeable parts between brands, while sharing chassis, suspension and transmissions.

One of the companies Durant bought in 1909 was the Northway Motor and Manufacturing Company founded by Ralph Northway who had previously supplied engines to Buick, Oakland, Cartercar and other 1900s manufacturers, including V8 engines to Oldsmobile, Oakland and Cadillac when they were independent companies. When Durant bought companies that became part of GM, Northway continued to supply engines to his former clients and added Cadillac, GMC and Oldsmobile to the list, then Northway Motors became the Northway Motor and Manufacturing Division in 1925 and became part of the GM Intercompany Parts Group.

When Fisher Body was bought in 1925, coachwork was shared and with the introduction of the Art and Color Section also in the late 1920, GM products shared appearances. The core items that made each brand unique were the engines. Buick and Chevrolet used overhead valves while Cadillac, Oldsmobile, Oakland used side valve or flathead engines and the divisions no longer outsourced their engines and manufactured them according to particular brand requirements. The original factory location was located at Maybury Grand Avenue, Buchanan Street and the Grand Trunk Railway in Detroit then later became GM truck Plant No. 7 in 1926 to manufacture front and rear axles and parts for past model Chevrolets. Starting around 1925 engine blocks and cylinder heads were now developed at each brand but were cast at Saginaw Metal Casting Operations. In the mid-1960s, there were 8 separate families of GM V8 engines on sale in the USA.

By the 1970s, GM began to see problems with their approach. For instance, four different North American divisions (Chevrolet, Pontiac, Oldsmobile and Buick) offered four completely different versions of a 350 cu in V8 engine - very few parts would interchange between the four designs despite their visual similarities, resulting in confusion for owners who naturally assumed that replacement parts would be usable across brands. In addition to these issues and the obvious overlap in production costs, the cost of certifying so many different engines for tightening worldwide emissions regulations threatened to become very costly.

Thus, by the early 1980s, GM had consolidated its powertrain engineering efforts into a few distinct lines. Generally, North American and European engineering units remained separate, with Australia's Holden and other global divisions borrowing designs from one or the other as needed. GM also worked out sharing agreements with other manufacturers such as Isuzu and Nissan to fill certain gaps in engineering. Similarly, the company also purchased other automotive firms (including Saab and Daewoo), eventually folding their engine designs into the corporate portfolio as well. GM later reorganized its Powertrain Division into GM Global Propulsion Systems, located at 800 N Glenwood Avenue in Pontiac, Michigan, which became the GM Global Product Group in March 2020 and is in close proximity to the old location of Pontiac Assembly.

GM's German subsidiary, Opel, relied on a range of three-, four- and six-cylinder gasoline and diesel engines. A survey of their range shows a reliance on petrol and diesel four-cylinders, and in 2014, there was only one 3-cylinder engine and one 6 cylinder engine in service in Opel's passenger car range.

In addition to automobile and truck engines, GM produced industrial engines, which were sold by brands such as Detroit Diesel, Allison, and Electro-Motive. Most of these engine designs are unrelated to GM's automotive engines.

== Automotive gasoline engines ==
=== Two-cylinder ===
- 1904–1911 Buick OHV flat-twin World's first production overhead valve engine.
- 1909 Oakland vertical engine

=== Three-cylinder ===
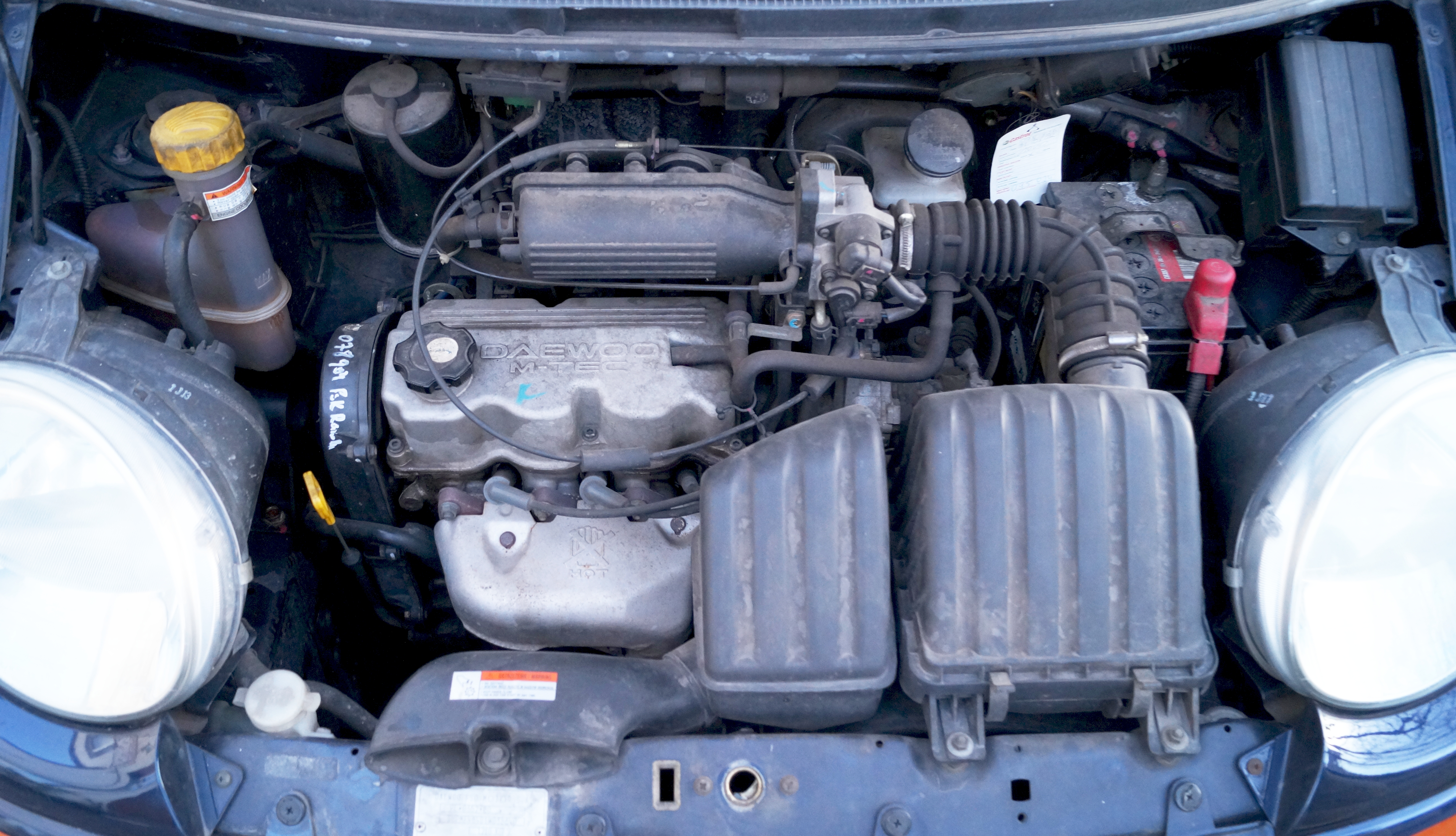
Daewoo M-TEC inline-three engine

==== Inline-3 ====
- 1991–present Daewoo M-TEC/S-TEC (acquired with purchase of Daewoo)
- 1984–present Suzuki G (designed and built by Suzuki)
- 1996–present GM Family 0
- 2013–present Small Gasoline Engine
- 2018–present GM E-Turbo engine
- 2020–present LXD engine Small diesel (Opel Models)

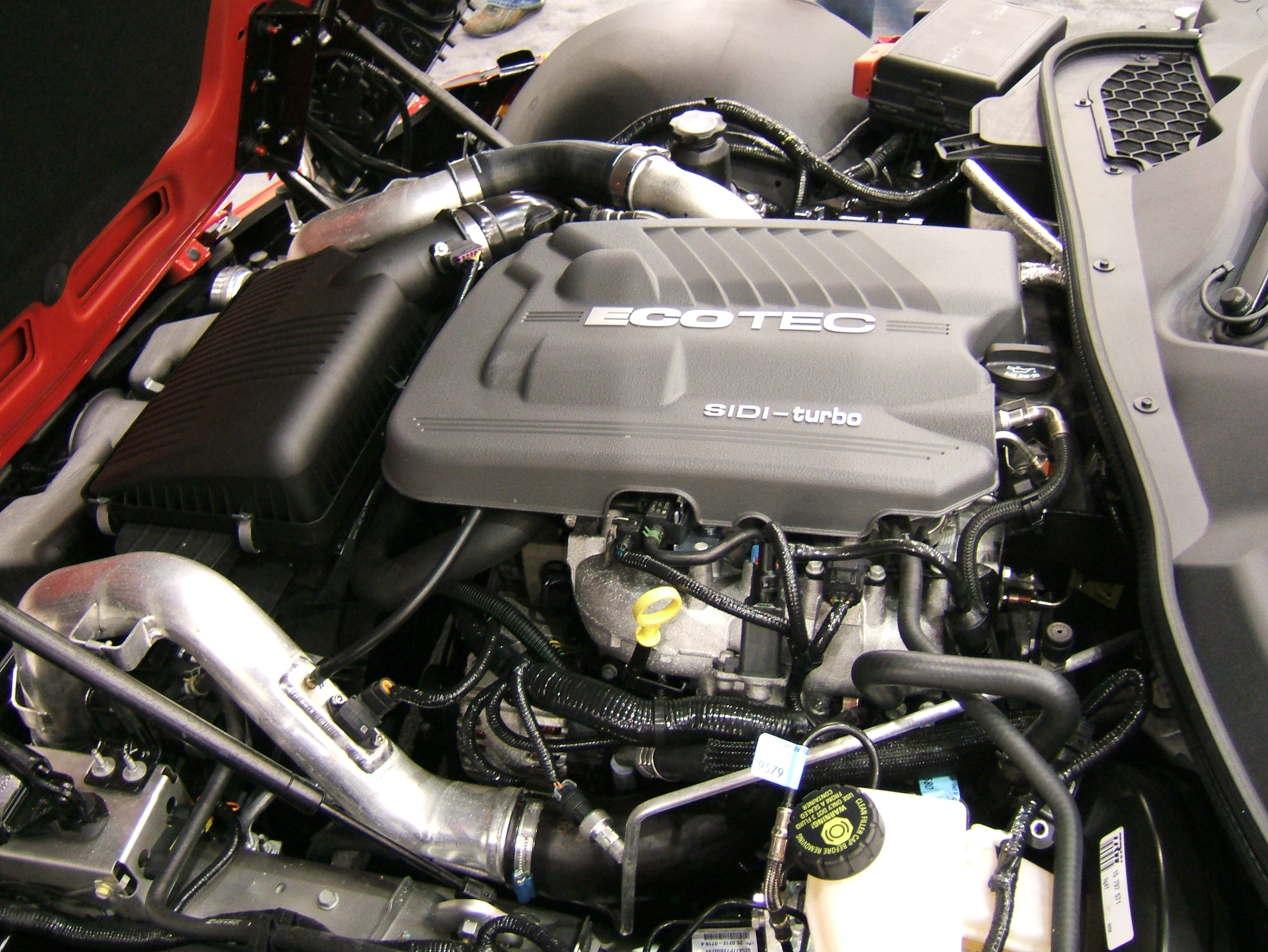
GM Family 1 inline-four engine

=== Four-cylinder ===
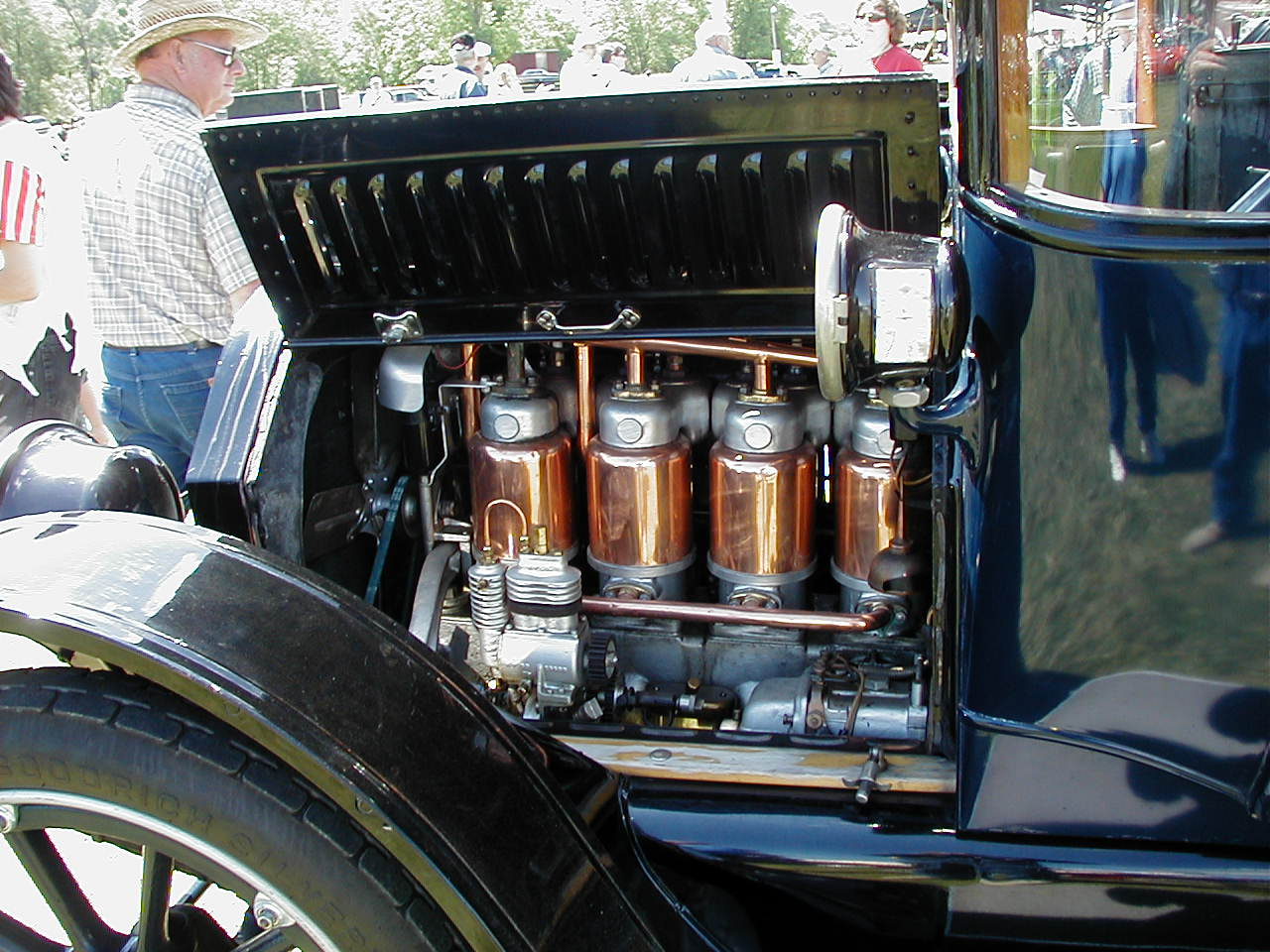
Cadillac inline-four engine

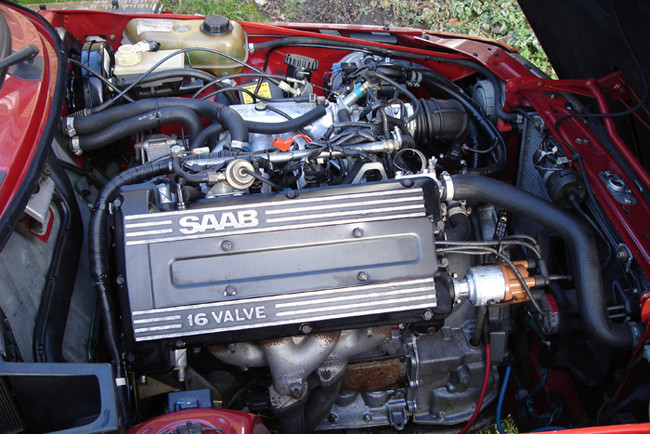
Saab H inline-four engine

==== Inline-4 ====
- 1905–1914 Cadillac Model D side-valve (acquired as part of the founding of GM)
- 1906–1923 Oldsmobile Model S side-valve (acquired as part of the founding of GM)
- 1906–1911 Buick Model D inline-4 (T-head design, the only non-OHV Buick engine ever made)
- 1909–1915, 1917–1918 Buick OHV (Model 10 had OHV-4)
- 1917–1924 Buick Series 30 OHV 170 cu in (2.8 L) inline-4
- 1909 Oakland Model 40 (acquired as part of the founding of GM)
- 1913–1928 Chevrolet inline-4 (acquired as part of Chevrolet's merger into GM)
- 1923 Chevrolet Series M Copper-Cooled
- 1937–1965 Opel Olympia OHV
- 1960–1963 Pontiac Trophy 4 (derived from the Pontiac 389)
- 1961–1992 Chevrolet 153 (derived from the Chevrolet inline-six)
- 1962–1993 Opel OHV "Kadett"
- 1963–1983 Vauxhall Viva OHV
- 1965–1994 Opel CIH
- 1966–1988 Vauxhall Slant-4
- 1970–1977 Chevrolet 2300 aluminium-block
- 1976–1993 Iron Duke (built by Pontiac)
- 1979–1986 Starfire (built by Holden)
- 1976–1986 Isuzu G161? SOHC (A different Brazilian based engine was used in the Chevrolet Chevette)
- 1980–2014 Family II SOHC/DOHC (designed by Opel)
- 1981–2003 GM 122/Vortec 2200
- 1981–2009 Saab H (acquired as part of Saab's merger into GM)
- 1982–present Family 1 SOHC/DOHC (designed by Opel)
- 1987–2001 Quad 4 DOHC (produced by Oldsmobile)
- 1989–1997 Toyota A (4A-GE/4A-FE, used in the Geo Prizm)
- 1990–2002 Saturn I4 SOHC/DOHC
- 1996–present Family 0 "Ecotec" DOHC (designed by Opel)
- 2000–present L850 "Ecotec" DOHC (designed jointly by Opel, Saab, and GM Powertrain)
- 2003–2008 Toyota ZZ DOHC (Found in the 1st Gen Pontiac Vibe)
- 2009–2010 Toyota ZR DOHC (Found in the 2nd Gen Pontiac Vibe)
- 2009–2010 Toyota AZ DOHC (Found in the 2nd Gen Pontiac Vibe)
- 2002–present Daewoo S-TEC SOHC/DOHC (acquired as part of Daewoo's merger into GM)
- 2003–2012 Atlas "Vortec" DOHC
- 2012–present Medium Gasoline "Ecotec" DOHC (designed by Opel)
- 2013–present Small Gasoline "Ecotec" DOHC (designed by Opel)
- 1995–2002 Suzuki G (used in the Chevrolet Tracker)
- 1995–2002 Suzuki J (used in the Chevrolet Tracker)
- 1990–1993 Isuzu X (used in the Geo Storm)
- 2018–present L3B

==== Flat-4 ====
- 1989–2011 Subaru EJ (used in the Saab 9-2X)

=== Five-cylinder ===
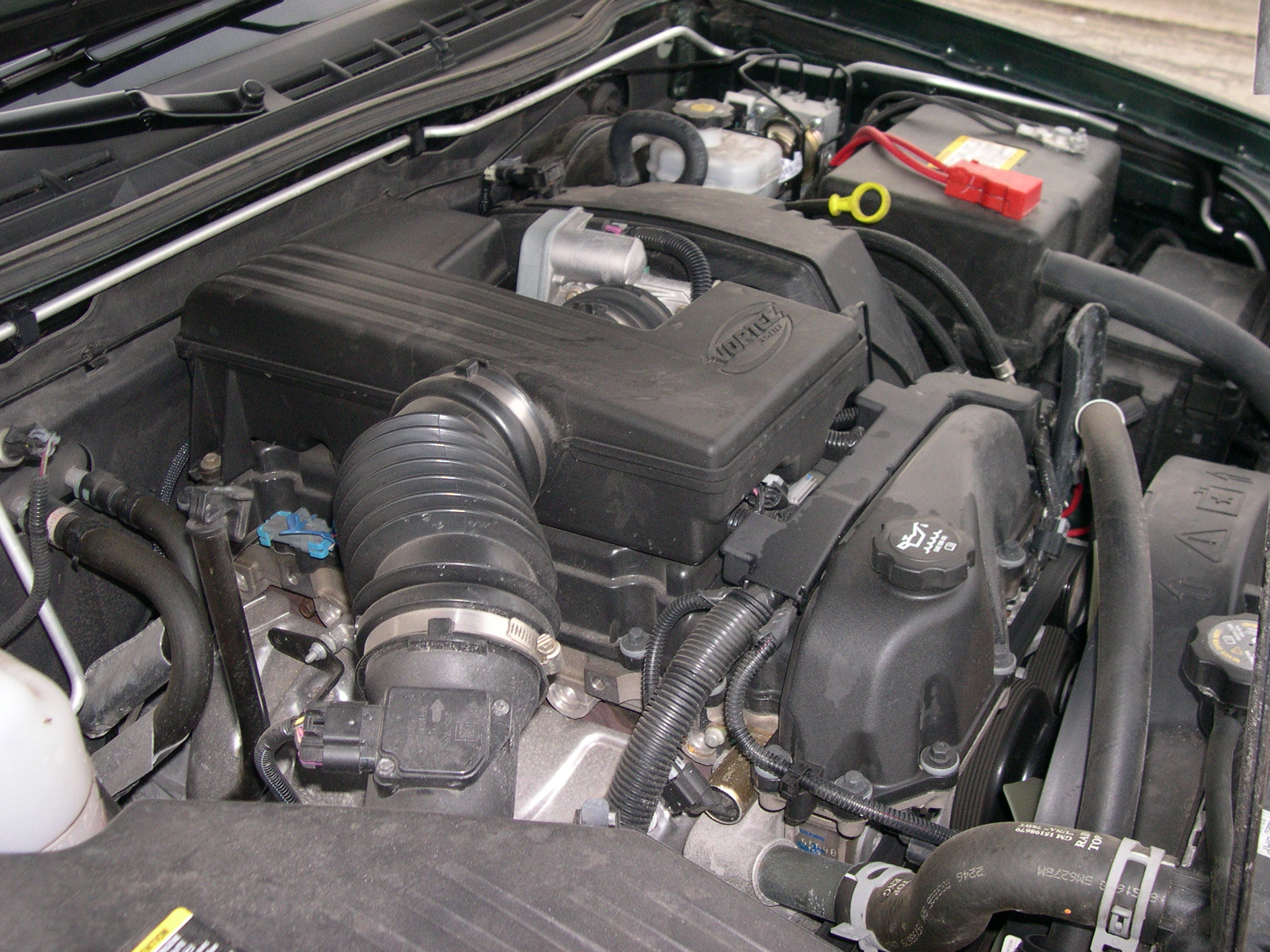
GM Atlas inline-five engine

- 2003–2012 Atlas "Vortec" inline-5

=== Six-cylinder ===
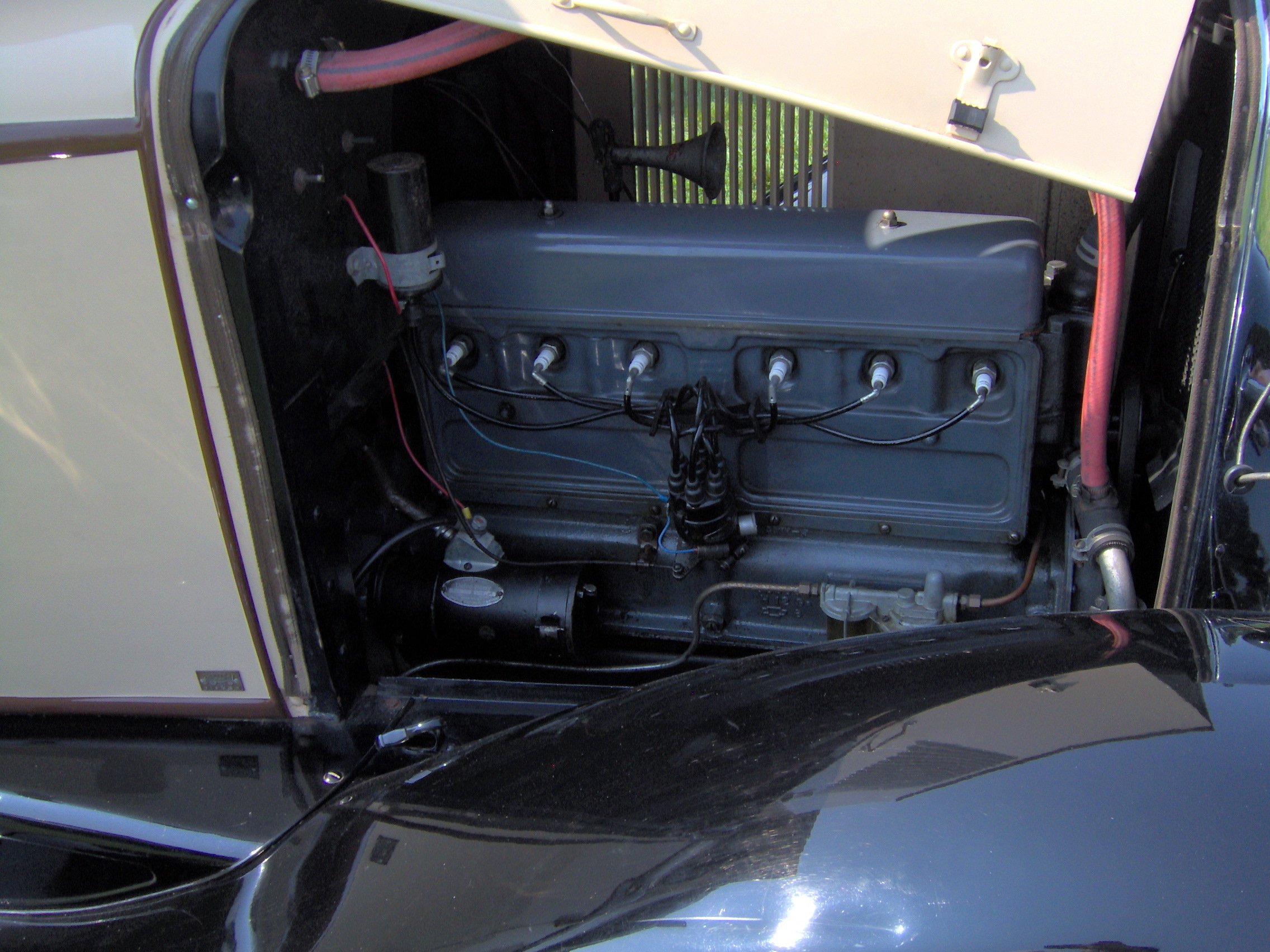
Chevrolet Stovebolt inline-six engine

==== Inline-6 ====
- 1908–1912 Oldsmobile Limited (acquired as part of the founding of GM)
- 1913–1923 Oakland Series 60
- 1913–1915 Oldsmobile Series 50
- 1914–1916 Buick Cast In Pairs
- 1916–1923 Buick Non-Removable-Head
- 1916–1927 Oldsmobile Series 30 inline-6
- 1923–1930 Buick Removable-Head
- 1923–1928 Oakland inline-6
- 1926–1927 Pontiac Split-Head (also modified for GMC trucks)
- 1928–1936 Chevrolet Stovebolt
- 1928–1950 Oldsmobile F-Series (also used in Buick Marquette)
- 1928–1954 Pontiac GMR (also modified for GMC trucks)
- 1930–1966 Opel inline-6 (as used in the Opel Kapitän)
- 1936–1962 Chevrolet Blue Flame inline-6 (also used in some GMC trucks)
- 1939–1962 GMC inline-6
- 1948–1962 Holden Grey
- 1962–2001 Chevrolet Turbo-Thrift
- 1964–1965 Pontiac OHV (derived from the Chevrolet Turbo-Thrift)
- 1966–1969 Pontiac OHC
- 1963–1980 Holden Red
- 1966–1993 Opel CIH
- 1980–1984 Holden Blue
- 1984–1986 Holden Black
- 1986–1988 Nissan RB30 (used in the Holden Commodore VL)
- 1999–2011 Daewoo XK inline-6 (marketed as "E-TEC", used in Daewoo Magnus, via GM's purchase of Daewoo Motor)
- 2001–2009 Atlas "Vortec"

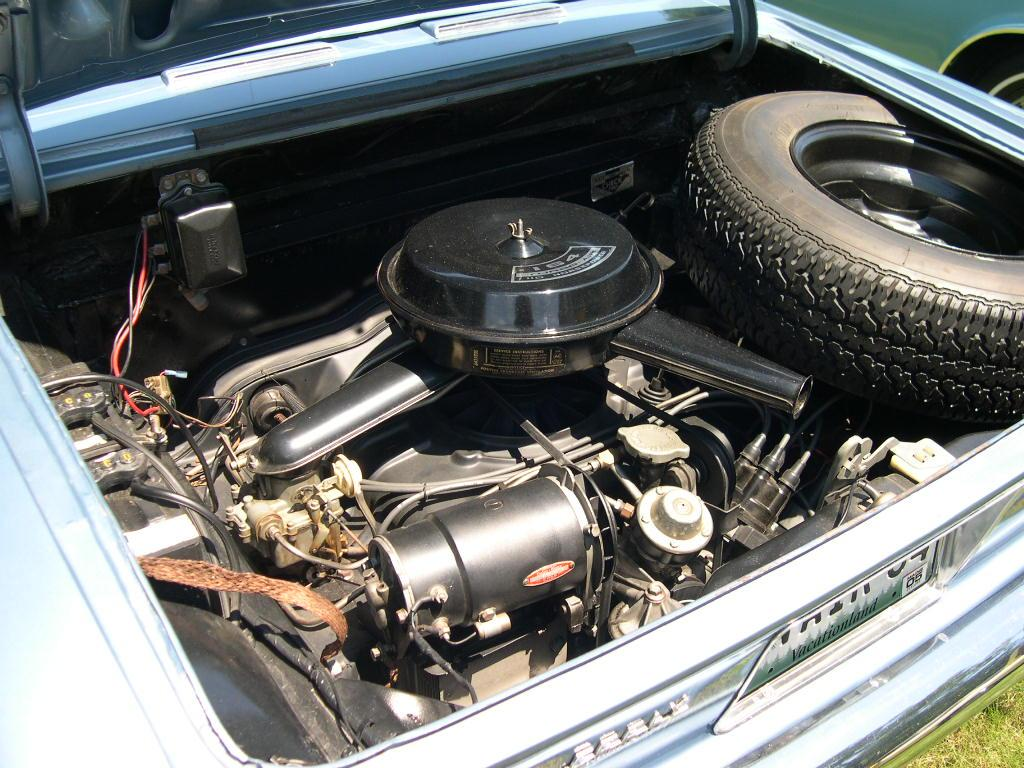
Chevrolet Corvair flat-six engine

==== Flat-6 ====
- 1960–1969 Chevrolet Turbo-Air 6 (developed and used exclusively for the Chevrolet Corvair)

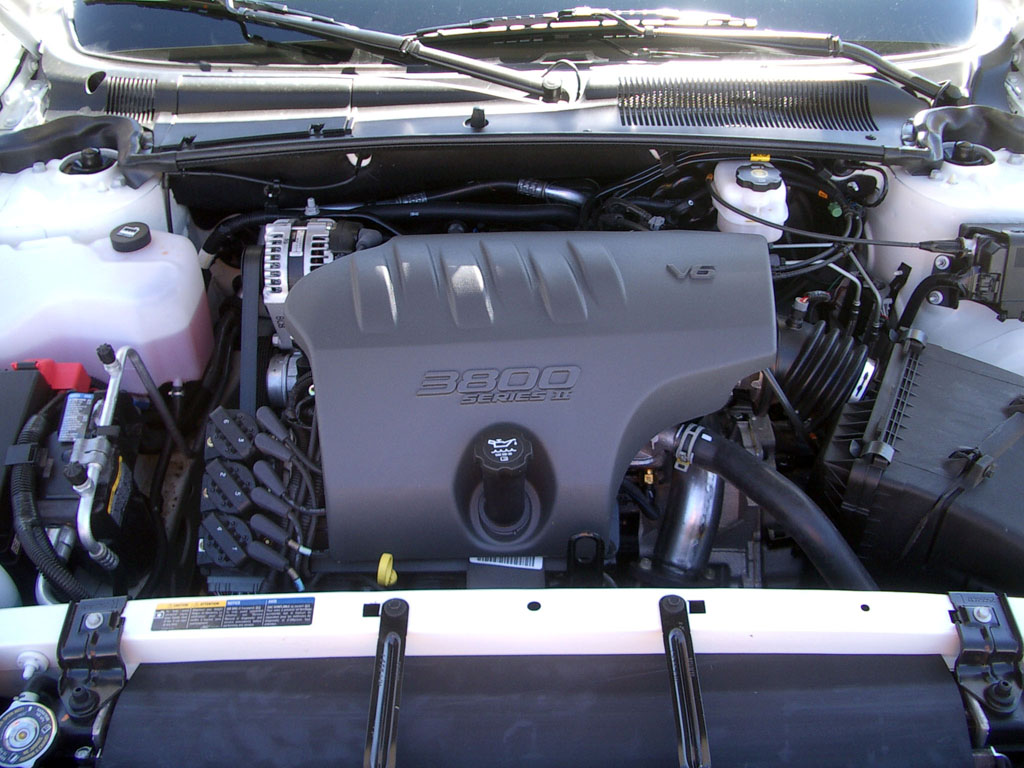
Buick V6 engine

==== V6 ====
- 1960–1974 GMC V6
- 1962–2009 Buick V6 (marketed as "Fireball V6", "3800", "Dauntless V6" in 1966-1971 Jeeps, and "Ecotec" in Holdens)
- 1977–2013 Chevrolet 90° V6 engine (derived from the Chevrolet Small-Block" V8; now marketed as GM Vortec V6 or Vortec 4300 or EcoTec3 V6)
- 1979–2010 Chevrolet 60-Degree V6
- 1994–2005 Opel 54-Degree L81 V6 (used in the Saturn Vue, Cadillac Catera and Saturn L series)
- 1995–present Suzuki H (used in several models built for GM by Suzuki)
- 2004–2007 Honda J (used in the Saturn Vue)
- 1998–2002 Shortstar LX5 (based on the Northstar V8)
- 2003–2011 GM High Value (an evolution of the Chevrolet 60-Degree V6)
- 2004–present GM High Feature
- 2012–present Chevrolet Indy V6 IndyCar Series (technically designed, built and assembled by Ilmor Engineering)

=== Eight-cylinder ===
From the 1950s through the 1970s, each GM division had its own V8 engine family. Today, there are only two families of V8 engines in production for road vehicles: the Generation V small-block and its Gemini small-block derivative.

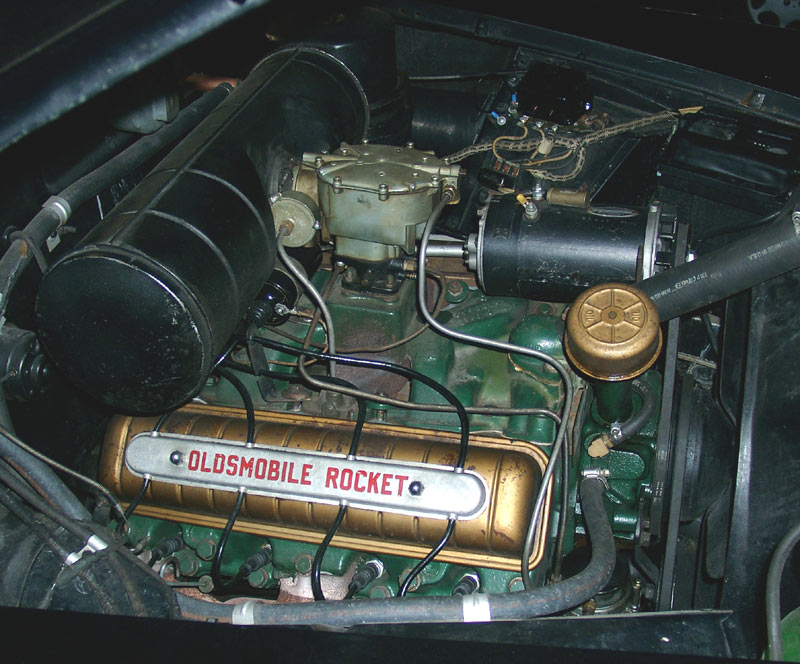
Oldsmobile Rocket V8 engine

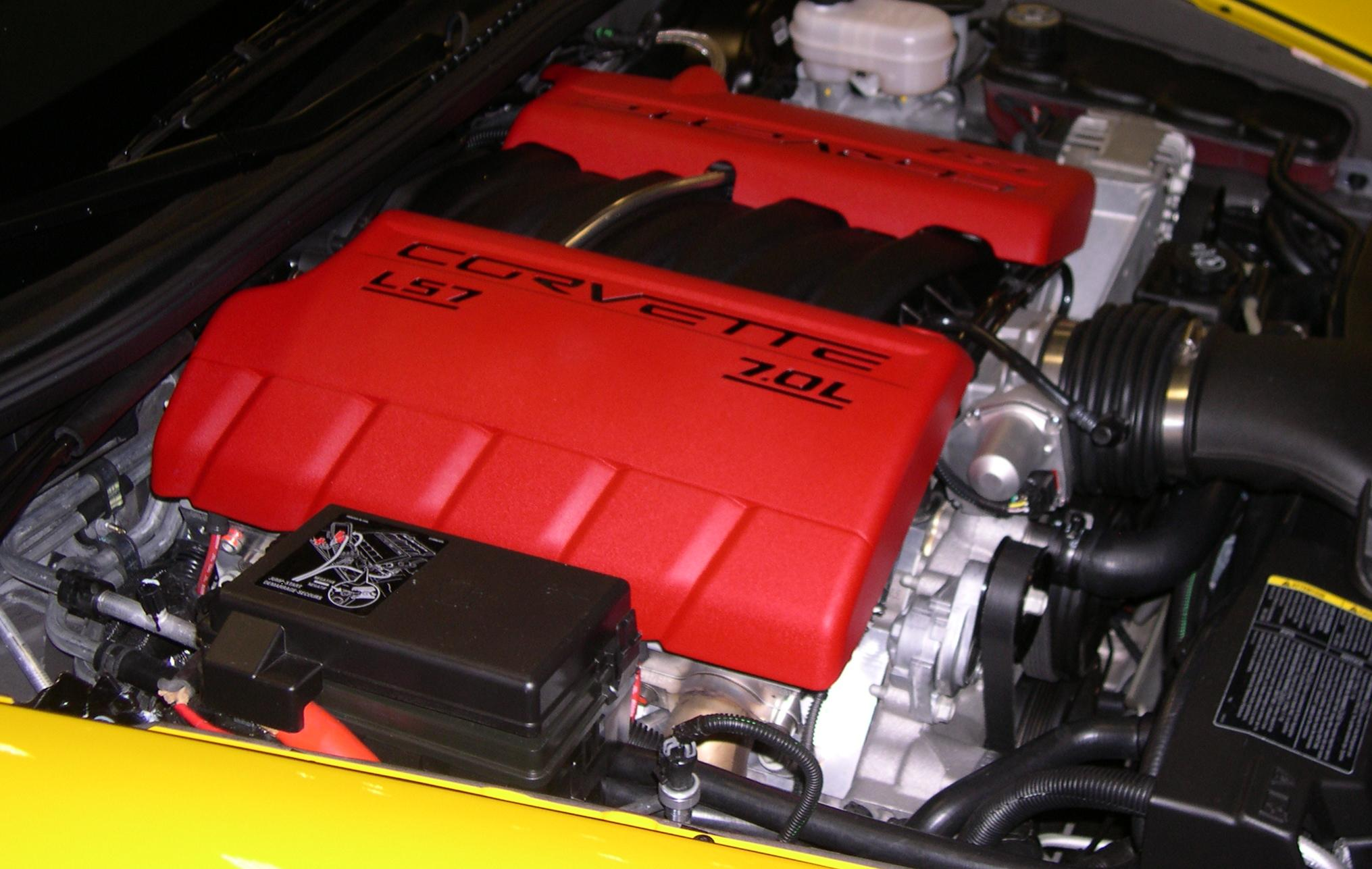
GM LS V8 engine

==== Inline-8 ====
- 1931–1936 Buick Straight-8
- 1932–1948 Oldsmobile Straight-8
- 1932–1954 Pontiac Silver Streak
- 1934–1936 LaSalle (Oldsmobile Straight-8 in a unique to LaSalle displacement assembled by LaSalle/Cadillac from Oldsmobile supplied components)
- 1936–1953 Buick Fireball

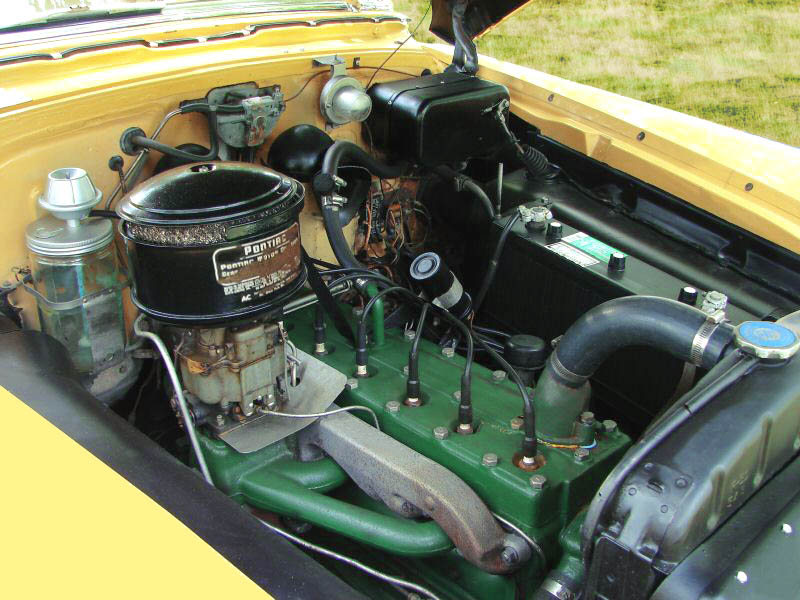
Pontiac Silver Streak eight engine

==== V8 ====
- 1914–1935 Cadillac Type 51 (also used in the LaSalle)
- 1915–1917 Oakland Model 50
- 1915–1923 Oldsmobile Model 40
- 1917–1918 Chevrolet Series D (acquired as part of Chevrolet's merger into GM)
- 1929–1931 Viking V8
- 1930–1932 Oakland V8 (used in Pontiac models during its final year)
- 1935–1948 Cadillac Series 60 (also used in the LaSalle)
- 1949–1980 Cadillac OHV V8
- 1949–1990 Oldsmobile Rocket V8
- 1953–1976 Buick Fireball V8 (also referred to as "Nailhead") & Buick Big-Block V8
- 1955–2003 Chevrolet Small-Block V8 "Generation I" (originally "Turbo-Fire")
- 1955–1980 Pontiac V8 (also modified for GMC Truck models)
- 1958–1965 Chevrolet W (also referred to as "Turbo-Thrust")
- 1961–1980 Buick small block V8 (formed the basis of the 1961-1963 Buick/Pontiac 215 (now better known as the Rover V8) and Oldsmobile 215 aluminum V8; and also the Buick-based "Dauntless V8" on Jeeps, or the Repco-Brabham V8 Formula One, Tasman Series, Indy and Sports car engine based on the Oldsmobile version)
- 1965–2009 Chevrolet Big-Block V8 (originally "Turbo-Jet")
- 1967–1972 GMC Truck 60-degree V8 (derived from the GMC 60-degree V6)
- 1967–1984 Cadillac New V8
- 1969–1984 Holden 253
- 1969–2000 Holden 308 (stroke reduced in 1985, making it 304 cu in (5.0 L); 350 cu in (5.7 L) version also produced from mid 1994 for use by HSV)
- 1982–1995 Cadillac HT
- 1990–1995 Chevrolet LT5 DOHC V8 (exclusive to the Chevrolet Corvette ZR-1)
- 1993–2010 Northstar V8 (also used in the Oldsmobile Aurora)
- 1992–1997 GM LT "Generation II" small-block V8
- 1997–2020 GM LS small-block V8 (referred to as Generation III or IV depending on type)
- 2014–present GM LT Generation V small-block V8 (Also called Ecotec3 V8)
- 2018–2020 Cadillac Blackwing twin-turbo V8
- 2023–present Chevrolet Gemini DOHC V8

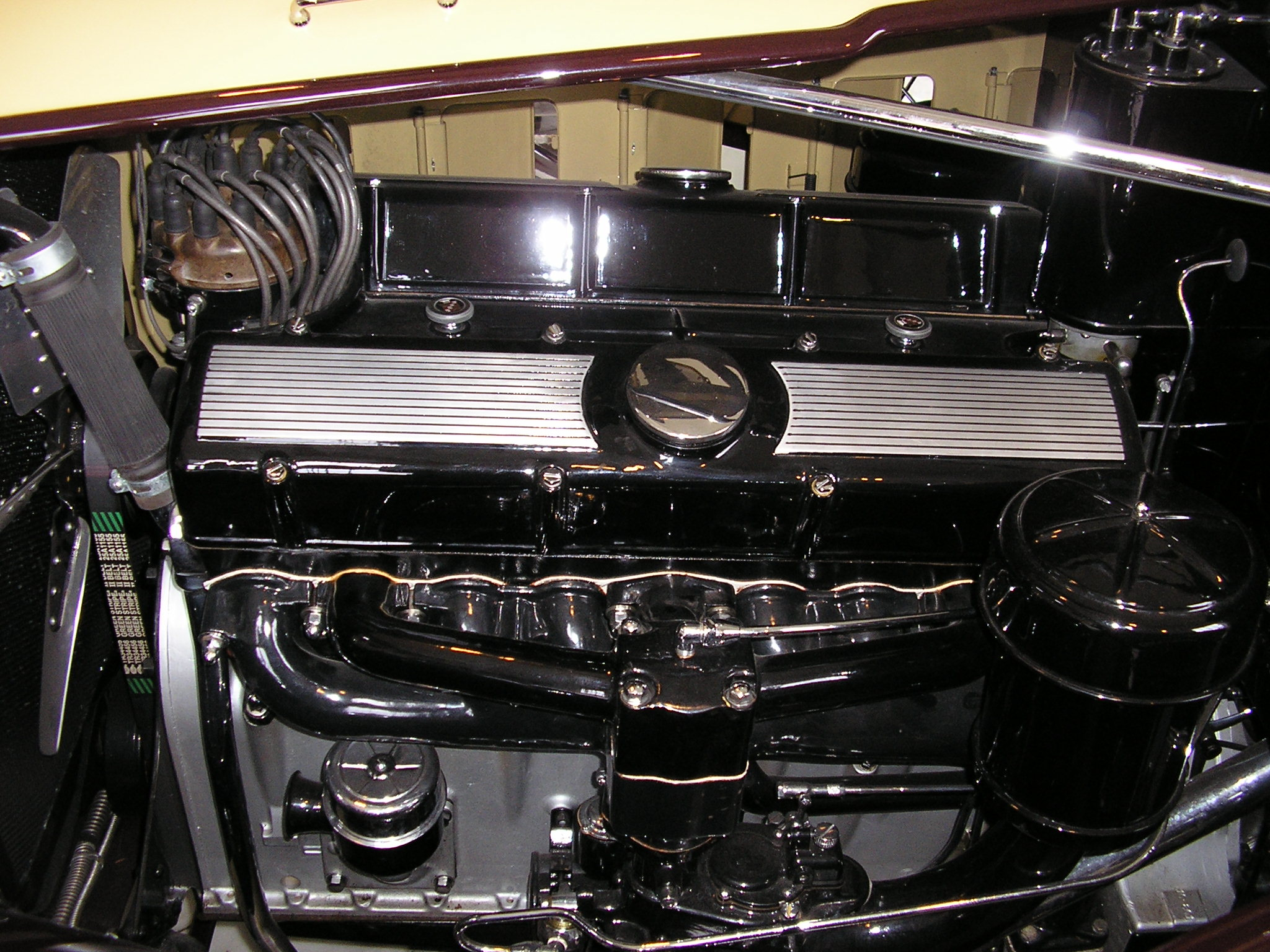
Cadillac Twelve engine

=== Twelve-cylinder ===
- 1930–1937 Cadillac Twelve (derived from the Cadillac Sixteen)
- 1960s–1966 GMC Twin Six (derived from the GMC V6)

=== Sixteen-cylinder ===
- 1930–1937 Cadillac Sixteen OHV
- 1937–1940 Cadillac Sixteen L-Head
- 2003 Cadillac Sixteen (concept only)

=== Gasoline-electric hybrid ===
- Voltec (used in the Chevrolet Volt)

== Automotive diesel engines ==
=== Three-cylinder ===
- 2020–present

=== Four-cylinder ===
- 1970–1977 Opel 2.1 liter
- 1975–1981 Opel 2.0 liter
- 1982–1988 Opel Family II 1.6 liter (16DA/16D)
- 1982–1993 Opel 2.3 liter (23YD/23YDT/23DTR)
- 1982–2000 Isuzu E (1.5 and 1.7 liter engines marketed as D or TD for Opel/Isuzu cars)
- 1990–2014 Isuzu Circle L (marketed as Ecotec DTI, DI or CDTI; acquired via GM's takeover of DMAX)
- 1996–2005 Opel 2.0 and 2.2 liter SOHC 16V (X20DTL/X20DTH/Y20DTL/Y20DTH/X22DTL/X22DTH/Y22DTL/Y22DTH/Y22DTR) (marketed as "Ecotec DTI" or "Ecotec DI")
- 2003–present Fiat 1.3 JTD (marketed as Ecotec CDTI or Ecotec depending on brand)
- 2003–2010 VM Motori RA 420 (marketed as Ecotec 2.0 CDTI or 2.0 VCDi depending on brand)
- 2004–2009 Fiat 1.9 JTD (marketed as Ecotec 1.9 CDTI or 1.9 TiD/TTiD depending on brand)
- 1996–present GM Family B "2.0 CDTI"
- 2011–2015 Family Z (marketed as "2.0", "2.2 VCDi" or "2.2 CDTI")
- 2012–2022 2.5 and 2.8 litre Duramax
- 2013–present GM Medium Diesel "1.6 CDTI Ecotec"
- 2014–present GM Large Diesel "2.0 CDTI Ecotec"

=== Six-cylinder ===
- 1980s–2011 Detroit Diesel 60 inline-6
- 1982–1985 Oldsmobile V6 Diesel 4.3L (the lesser-known counterpart to the infamous Oldsmobile 350 diesel)
- 1994–2003 BMW M51 2.5 liter (X25DT/U25DT/Y25DT)
- 2002–present DMAX V6 (acquired via GM's takeover of DMAX)
- 2019–present Duramax I6

=== Eight-cylinder ===
- 1977–1985 Oldsmobile Diesel engine
- 1982–2000 Detroit Diesel V8 6.2L and 6.5L (6.5L engines are still in production by AM General for use in Humvees and various marine applications)
- 2001–present Duramax V8 (acquired via GM's 2003 takeover of DMAX)

== Other diesel engines ==
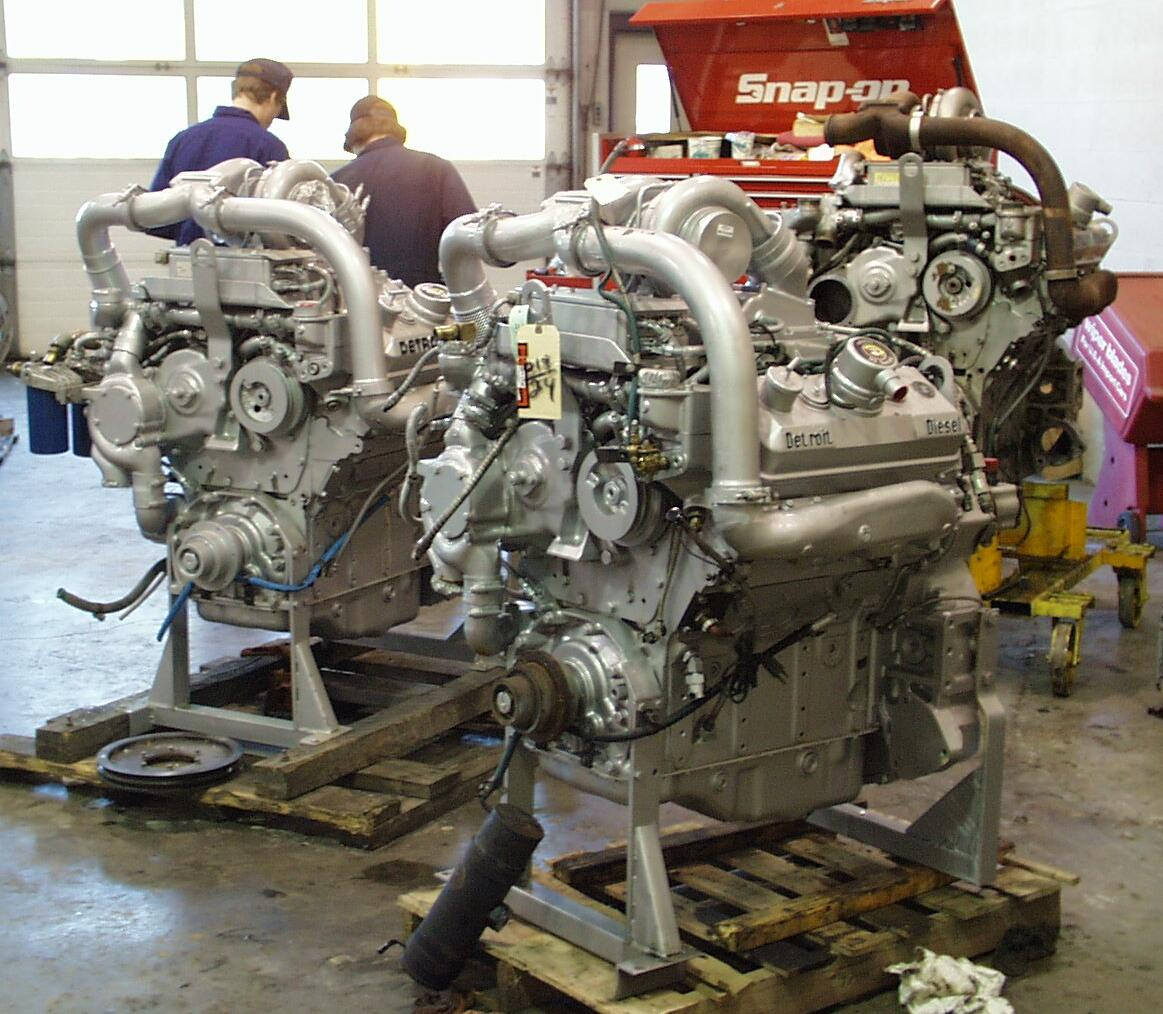
Detroit Diesel Series 92 engines

GM entered the diesel field with its acquisition of the Cleveland-based Winton Engine Company in 1930. Winton's main client was the Electro Motive Company, a producer of internal combustion-electric rail motorcars. GM acquired Electro Motive at roughly the same time as Winton.

A partnership of GM's Research and Development Division and their Winton Engine Corporation delivered their first diesel engines suitable for mobile use starting in 1934. The engines were also sold for marine and stationary applications. In a 1938 reorganization, Winton Engine Corporation became the GM Cleveland Diesel Engine Division, and GM's Detroit Diesel Engine Division began production of smaller (50–149 cu in (0.8–2.4 L) per cylinder) diesel engines. Locomotive engines were moved under the GM Electro Motive Division (EMD) in 1941, while Cleveland Diesel retained development and production of large marine and stationary engines.

Cleveland Diesel was dissolved in 1962 and their remaining production moved to EMD. In 1988, the Detroit Diesel Engine Division was incorporated as an independent company, later acquired by DaimlerChrysler in 2005. EMD was sold off by GM in 2005 and is now a subsidiary of Progress Rail.

=== Locomotive engines ===
- 1934–1938 Winton 201-A (multi-purpose)
- 1938–1966 EMD 567
- 1965–1988 EMD 645
- 1984–present EMD 710
- 1998–present EMD 265

=== Marine/stationary diesel engines ===
- 1934–1938 Winton 201-A (multi-purpose)
- 248 (8, 12, 16 cylinder)
- 258 (12 cylinder, 4 stroke, direct reversing)
- 258S (16 cylinder, 4 stroke, turbocharged, direct reversing)
- 268 (3, 4, 6, 8 cylinder)
- 268A (3, 4, 6, 8 cylinder)
- 268A NM (8 cylinder)
- 278 (6, 8, 12, 16 cylinder)
- 278A (6, 8, 12, 16 cylinder)
- 278A NM (8, 12 cylinder)
- 241 (6 cylinder - 4 stroke)
- 288 (12 cylinder, direct reversing)
- 338 (16 cylinder, vertical radial)
- 498 (8, 12, 16 cylinder)
- 498 NM (8 cylinder)
- 358H (16 cylinder, horizontal radial)

== Heavy and off-road diesel engines ==
- 1938–1995 Detroit Diesel Series 71
- 1945–1965 Detroit Diesel Series 110
- 1950–1955 Detroit Diesel Series 51
- 1957–1990s Detroit Diesel Series 53
- 1960s–1980s Detroit Diesel Series 149
- 1974–1995 Detroit Diesel Series 92

== Turboshaft engines for land ==
GM Whirlfire engine, including:

- 1953 GT-300
- 1954 GT-302
- 1956 GT-304
- 1958 GT-305
- 1964 GT-309
- 1971 GT-404

== Aircraft engines ==
=== Piston ===
- 1931–1944 Allison V-1710
- 1937–1944 Allison V-3420 (derived from the V-1710)

=== Propfan ===
- 1987–1989 *Allison 578-DX

=== Turboprop ===
- 1947–1950s Allison T38
- 1953–1955 Allison T40
- 1954–present Allison T56 "501-D" (also produced by Rolls-Royce)

=== Turboshaft ===
- 1954–present Allison T56 "501-D" (also produced by Rolls-Royce)
- 1960s–present Allison 250 (also produced by Rolls-Royce)

=== Turbojet ===
- 1944–1959 Allison J33 (originally developed by General Electric and transferred to GM for production)
- 1946–1955 Allison J35 (originally developed by General Electric and transferred to GM for production)
- 1948–1958 Allison J71

== Motorsports ==
- 2007–present Chevrolet R07
- 1998–2006 Chevrolet SB2
- 1982–present Chevrolet DRCE (originally developed by Oldsmobile and switched to the Chevrolet brand in 1996)
