= GMC V8 engine =

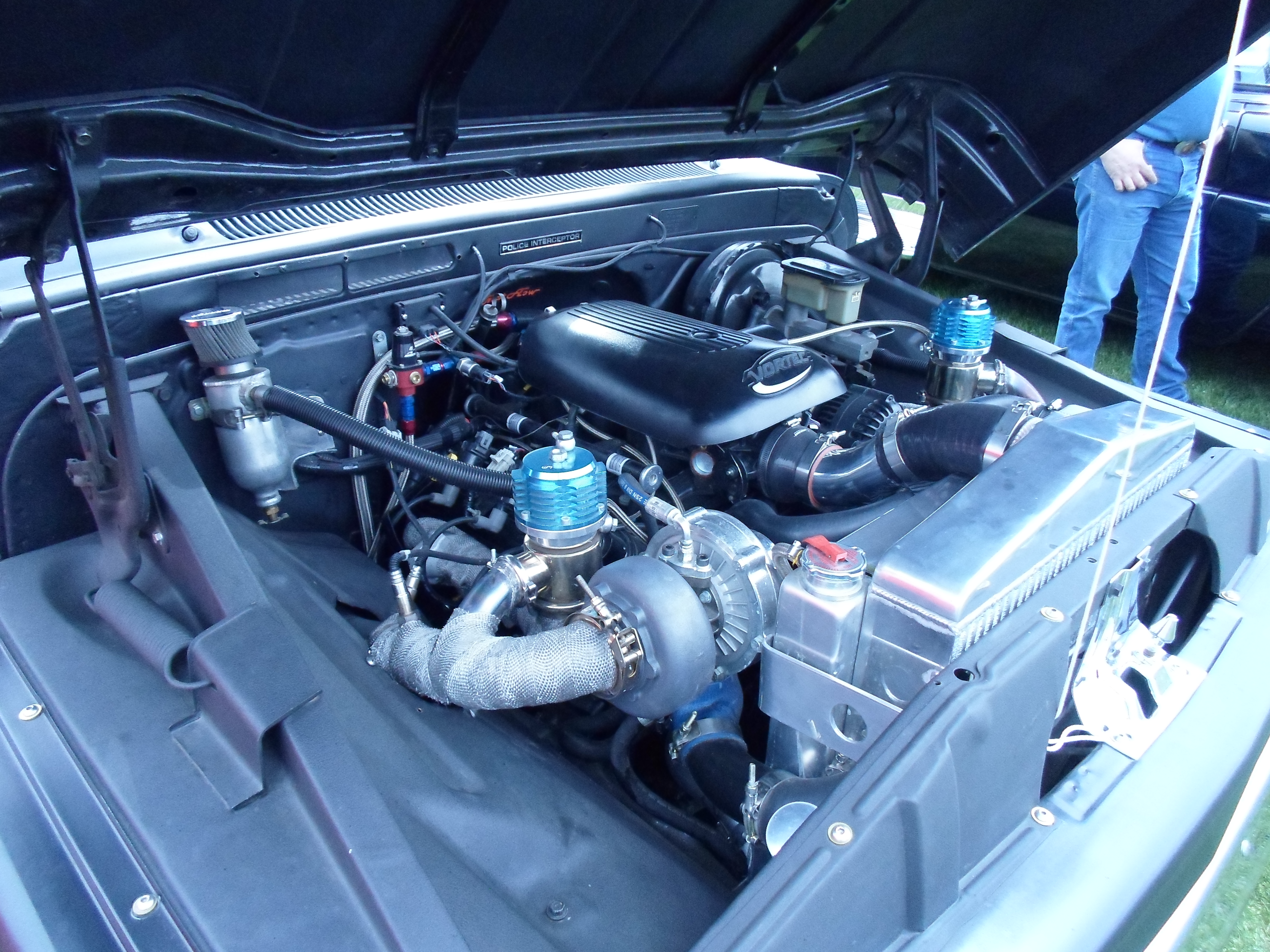

Overview
- Manufacturer: General Motors
- Production: 1966–1972

Layout
- Configuration: 60° V8
- Displacement: 637 cu in (10.4 L)
- Cylinder bore: 5.125 in (130.2 mm)
- Piston stroke: 3.86 in (98.0 mm)
- Cylinder block material: Cast iron
- Cylinder head material: Cast iron
- Valvetrain: OHV 2 valves × cyl.

Combustion
- Fuel system: Carburetor
- Fuel type: Gasoline, Diesel
- Cooling system: Water-cooled

Output
- Power output: 192 hp (143.2 kW)
- Torque output: 371 lb⋅ft (503.0 N⋅m) (net)

GMC has both shared engine designs and architectures with other General Motors divisions as well as having a history of developing and using its own unique engines and powertrains such as its line of straight-6 and V8 engines.

== GMC engines ==
GMC's own V8 was the 637-cubic-inch (10.4 L) unit, which was essentially a 478 V6 with two cylinders added. It shared the 5.125 in × 3.86 in (130.2 mm × 98.0 mm) bore and stroke and used a single camshaft. It was manufactured in gasoline and diesel versions, and was the largest-displacement production gasoline V8 ever made for highway trucks. The GMC 637 V8 was produced from 1965 to 1973.

== Non-GMC engines ==
=== Pontiac ===
Prior to developing its own engines, smaller GMC trucks used the Pontiac V8 engine. They used the Pontiac 287-cubic-inch (4.7 L) engine for 1955 and 316-cubic-inch (5.2 L) engine in 1956, but advertised the engines as the "GMC 288" and "GMC 316". They used Pontiac's 347-cubic-inch (5.7 L) in 1957. For 1958, GMC reduced the bore of Pontiac's 370-cubic-inch (6.1 L) to 3.875 in (98.4 mm), resulting in a displacement of 336-cubic-inch (5.5 L). (In Canada, however, GMC used the Chevrolet small-block engine rather than the Pontiac.) For 1959, as the Pontiac engine's stroke was lengthened to 3.75 in (95.3 mm), a further bore reduction to 3.78 in (96.0 mm) was done to keep the displacement at 336.7 cubic inches (5.5 L).

=== Oldsmobile ===
Starting in 1955, for the larger trucks, the Oldsmobile Rocket V8 was available. In 1955 and 1956, it was 324 cubic inches (5.3 L). Power listed for 1956 was 210 hp @ 4200 rpm; torque was 305 lb-ft @ 2400 rpm. For the 1957 through 1959 model years, it was upped in bore and stroke and called the 370. Power was listed as 232 hp @ 4200 rpm and torque as 355 lb-ft @ 2600 rpm.

=== Chevrolet Small-Block ===
From 1955 through 2003, GMC shared Chevrolet's small-block V8. This came in 265, 283, 305, 327, 350, and 400 cu in (4.3, 4.6, 5.0, 5.3, 5.7, and 6.6 L) sizes.

=== Chevrolet Big-Block ===
GMC also shared Chevrolet's big-block V8 from 1968 through 2009. The company used the 366, 396, 402, 427, 454, and 496 (6.0, 6.5, 6.6, 7.0, 7.4, and 8.1 L) versions.

=== GM LS-based engines ===
Beginning in 1999, GMC began offering GM's LS-based "small-block" V8 engine in various models. Through the years, engines have been offered in 4.8, 5.3, 6.0, 6.2, and 6.6-liter displacements.

=== Duramax engines ===
Beginning in 2001, GMC offered the same turbocharged diesel Duramax V8 engines as were available in similar Chevrolet trucks. The engine family was co-developed by GM Powertrain and Isuzu, and has gone through numerous iterations through the years. Duramax engines are paired with a heavy-duty automatic transmission from GM's Allison division.

== See also ==
- Chevrolet small-block engine (first- and second-generation)
- Chevrolet big-block engine
- LS based GM small-block engine
- Duramax V8 engine
- Buick V8 engine
- Cadillac V8 engine
- Oldsmobile V8 engine
- Pontiac V8 engine
- Holden V8 engine
- GMC straight-6 engine
- GMC V6 engine
- List of GM engines
