= GMC V6 engine =

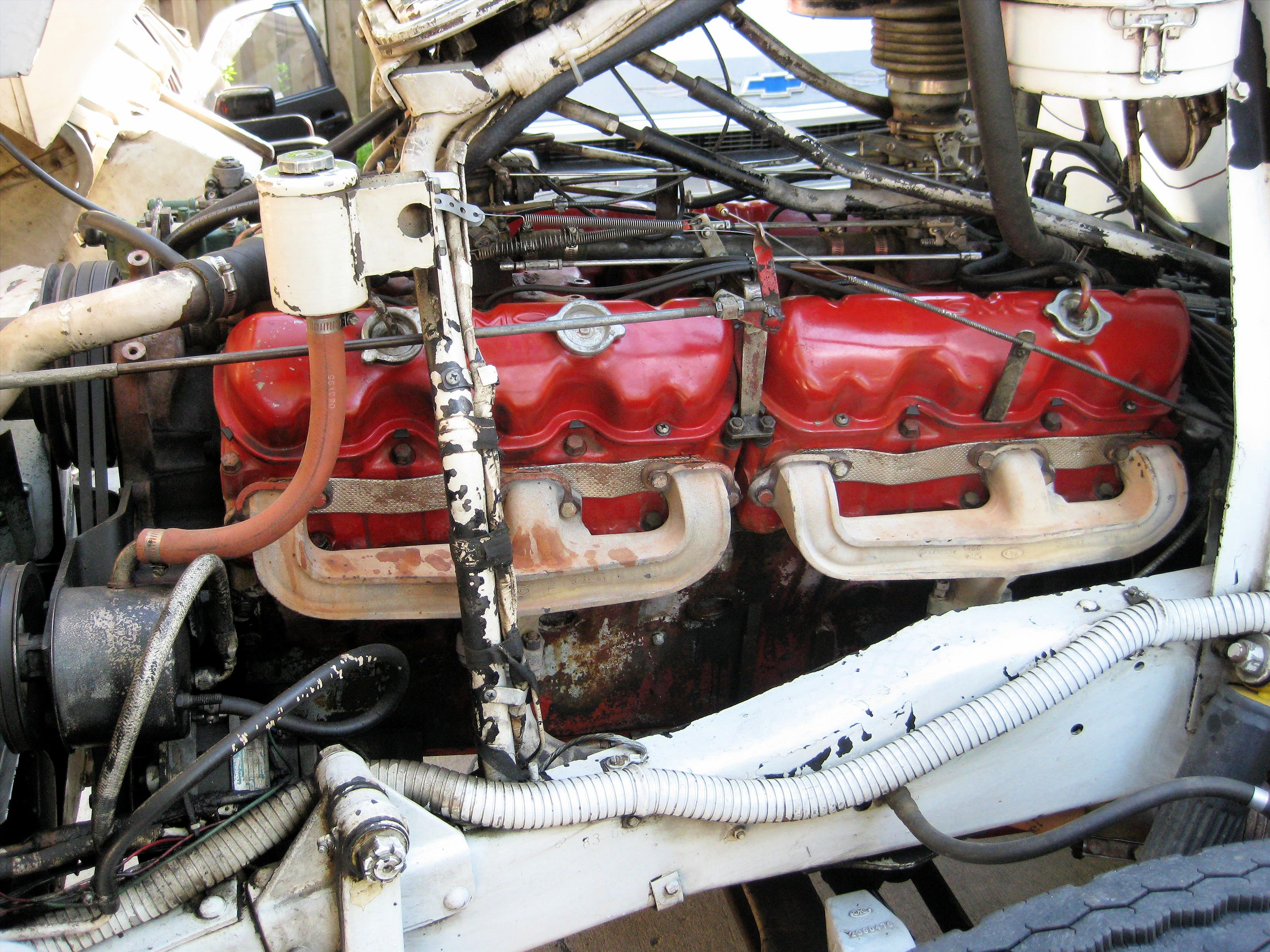
- GMC "Twin Six" heavy duty engine 702 cu in (11.5 L)

Overview
- Manufacturer: General Motors
- Production: 1959–1974

Layout
- Configuration: 60° V6, V8, and V12
- Displacement: 305 cu in (5.0 L); 351 cu in (5.8 L); 379 cu in (6.2 L); 401 cu in (6.6 L); 432 cu in (7.1 L); 478 cu in (7.8 L); 637 cu in (10.4 L); 702 cu in (11.5 L)
- Cylinder bore: 4.25 in (108 mm); 4.56 in (115.8 mm); 4.87 in (123.7 mm); 4.875 in (123.8 mm); 5.125 in (130.2 mm)
- Piston stroke: 3.58 in (90.9 mm); 3.86 in (98 mm)
- Cylinder block material: Cast iron
- Cylinder head material: Cast iron
- Valvetrain: OHV 2 valves × cyl.

Combustion
- Fuel system: Carburetor
- Fuel type: Gasoline and diesel
- Cooling system: Water-cooled

Output
- Power output: 150–275 hp (112–205 kW)
- Torque output: 260–630 lb⋅ft (353–854 N⋅m)

The GMC V6 is a family of 60-degree V6 engines produced by the GMC division of General Motors from 1959 through 1974. It was developed into both gasoline and diesel versions, and produced in V8 and V12 derivatives. Examples of this engine family were found in pickup trucks, Suburbans, heavier trucks, and motor coaches.

A big-block engine, variants were produced in 305-, 351-, 401-, and 478-cubic-inch (5.0, 5.8, 6.6, and 7.8 liters respectively) displacements, with considerable parts commonality. During the latter years of production, 379-and-432-cubic-inch (6.2 and 7.1 L) versions with enlarged crankshaft journals were manufactured as well.

GMC produced a 637-cubic-inch (10.4 L) 60° V8 with a single camshaft using the same general layout (bore and stroke) as the 478 V6. The 637 V8 was the largest-displacement production gasoline V8 ever made for highway trucks.

The largest engine derived from the series was a 702-cubic-inch (11.5 L) "Twin Six" V12, which had a unique block and crankshaft, but shared many exterior parts with the 351.

Diesel versions of the 351, 478 and 637, advertised as the ToroFlow, were also manufactured. These engines had no relationship to the well-known Detroit Diesel two-stroke diesel engines produced by General Motors during the same time period.

All versions of the GMC V6 used a six-throw crankshaft, which when combined with the 60 degree included cylinder angle, produced a smooth-running engine without any need for a balance shaft. Spark plugs were located on the inboard side of the cylinder heads and were accessed from the top of the engine. This position allowed for shorter spark-plug wires and kept the spark plugs away from the hot exhaust manifolds, something which was emphasized in sales literature. It was also perceived as being easier to access for maintenance. These GMC V6 engines were noted for durability, ease of maintenance, and strong low-end torque.

In 1974, GMC discontinued the V6 engine; all gasoline-engine models were powered by Chevrolet straight-six and V8 engines, while diesel engines were dropped from medium duty models and would not return until 1976.

GMC 60° Engine Family
| Fuel | Cylinders | Model | Displacement | Bore | Stroke | Power (Net) | Torque (Net) |
|---|---|---|---|---|---|---|---|
| Gasoline | 6 | 305A | 304.6 cu in (5.0 L) | 4.25 in (108 mm) | 3.58 in (91 mm) | 125 hp (93 kW) | 240 lb⋅ft (325 N⋅m) |
| Gasoline | 6 | 305B | 304.6 cu in (5.0 L) | 4.25 in (108 mm) | 3.58 in (91 mm) | 127 hp (95 kW) | 245 lb⋅ft (332 N⋅m) |
| Gasoline | 6 | 305C | 304.6 cu in (5.0 L) | 4.25 in (108 mm) | 3.58 in (91 mm) | 142 hp (106 kW) | 250 lb⋅ft (339 N⋅m) |
| Gasoline | 6 | 305D | 304.6 cu in (5.0 L) | 4.25 in (108 mm) | 3.58 in (91 mm) | 142 hp (106 kW) | 260 lb⋅ft (353 N⋅m) |
| Gasoline | 6 | 305E | 304.6 cu in (5.0 L) | 4.25 in (108 mm) | 3.58 in (91 mm) | 142 hp (106 kW) | 260 lb⋅ft (353 N⋅m) |
| Gasoline | 6 | 351/351C | 351 cu in (5.8 L) | 4.56 in (116 mm) | 3.58 in (91 mm) | 155 hp (116 kW) | 288 lb⋅ft (390 N⋅m) |
| Gasoline | 6 | 351E | 351 cu in (5.8 L) | 4.56 in (116 mm) | 3.58 in (91 mm) | 190 hp (142 kW) | 304 lb⋅ft (412 N⋅m) |
| Gasoline | 6 | 351M | 351 cu in (5.8 L) | 4.56 in (116 mm) | 3.58 in (91 mm) | 190 hp (142 kW) | 304 lb⋅ft (412 N⋅m) |
| Gasoline | 6 | 379 | 379 cu in (6.2 L) | 4.56 in (116 mm) | 3.86 in (98 mm) | 170 hp (127 kW) | 266 lb⋅ft (361 N⋅m) |
| Gasoline | 6 | 401 | 401 cu in (6.6 L) | 4.875 in (123.8 mm) | 3.58 in (91 mm) | 178 hp (133 kW) | 351 lb⋅ft (476 N⋅m) |
| Gasoline | 6 | 401M | 401 cu in (6.6 L) | 4.875 in (123.8 mm) | 3.58 in (91 mm) | 210 hp (157 kW) | 348 lb⋅ft (472 N⋅m) |
| Gasoline | 6 | 432 | 432 cu in (7.1 L) | 4.875 in (123.8 mm) | 3.86 in (98 mm) | 190 hp (142 kW) | 336 lb⋅ft (456 N⋅m) |
| Gasoline | 6 | 478 | 478 cu in (7.8 L) | 5.125 in (130.2 mm) | 3.86 in (98 mm) | 206 hp (154 kW) | 400 lb⋅ft (542 N⋅m) |
| Gasoline | 6 | 478M | 478 cu in (7.8 L) | 5.125 in (130.2 mm) | 3.86 in (98 mm) | 225 hp (168 kW) | 410 lb⋅ft (556 N⋅m) |
| Gasoline | 8 | 637 | 637 cu in (10.4 L) | 5.125 in (130.2 mm) | 3.86 in (98 mm) | 250 hp (186 kW) | 560 lb⋅ft (759 N⋅m) |
| Gasoline | 12 | 702 | 702 cu in (11.5 L) | 4.56 in (116 mm) | 3.58 in (91 mm) | 250 hp (186 kW) | 585 lb⋅ft (793 N⋅m) |
| Diesel | 6 | D351 | 351.2 cu in (5.8 L) | 4.56 in (116 mm) | 3.58 in (91 mm) | 118 hp (88 kW) | 234 lb⋅ft (317 N⋅m) |
| Diesel | 6 | D478 | 477.7 cu in (7.8 L) | 5.125 in (130.2 mm) | 3.86 in (98 mm) | 135 hp (101 kW) | 266 lb⋅ft (361 N⋅m) |
| Diesel | 6 | DH478 | 477.7 cu in (7.8 L) | 5.125 in (130.2 mm) | 3.86 in (98 mm) | 155 hp (116 kW) | 298 lb⋅ft (404 N⋅m) |
| Diesel | 8 | D637 | 637 cu in (10.4 L) | 5.125 in (130.2 mm) | 3.86 in (98 mm) | 185 hp (138 kW) | 440 lb⋅ft (597 N⋅m) |
| Diesel | 8 | DH637 | 637 cu in (10.4 L) | 5.125 in (130.2 mm) | 3.86 in (98 mm) | 205 hp (153 kW) | 444 lb⋅ft (602 N⋅m) |

== Gasoline V6 ==
=== 305 ===
The 304.6-cubic-inch (5.0 L) 305 had a 4.25 in × 3.58 in (108 mm × 91 mm) bore and stroke. The 305A was equipped with a single barrel carburetor and produced 150 hp (112 kW) gross at 3600 RPM and 260 lb⋅ft (353 N⋅m) gross at 1600 RPM (measured without air cleaner or accessories in an ideal environment). The 305E was equipped with a two barrel carburetor and produced 170 hp (127 kW) gross at 4000 RPM and 263 lb⋅ft (357 N⋅m) gross at 1600 RPM in 1969.

The 305 was GMC's standard pickup truck and Suburban engine from 1960 to 1969. The 305A was standard in 1000–3500 series trucks in 1960–1961 and was dropped in 1962. The 305D was an option in the 1000–3500 series in 1961 and became standard in 1962, replacing the 305A. The 305E replaced the 305D in the 1000–3500 series trucks in 1963 and was used until 1969. The 305B and 305C (a 305B with a different manifold and carburetor) were used in 4000 and 5000 series trucks; the 305B was dropped in 1962 while the 305C continued to 1974.

=== 351 ===
The 351-cubic-inch (5.8 L) 351 had a 4.56 in × 3.58 in (115.8 mm × 90.9 mm) bore and stroke. The 351C produced 195 hp (145 kW) gross at 3600 RPM and 314 lb⋅ft (426 N⋅m) gross at 1600 RPM, while the 351M produced 254 hp (189 kW) gross at 3700 RPM and 442 lb⋅ft (599 N⋅m) gross at 1400 RPM in 1969. Introduced in 1960, the 351 was available as a C series, an E series (351E), and Magnum series (351M). The E and M series featured a larger two-barrel carburetor and an open port intake, bigger intake and exhaust ports, larger diameter valves, and larger exhaust manifolds. The 351E did not use the same parts as the 305E.

The 351 or 351C were used in some 4000, 5000, and 6000 series trucks from 1962 to 1972 and the 351E was used in the 1000–3500 series trucks from 1966 to 1969. The 351, 351C, and 351M engines were medium duty truck engines, while the 351E was a light-duty engine – basically a 351M without the oil-driven governors. In 1973, the 351 was replaced by the 379-cubic-inch V6.

=== 379 ===
The 378.6-cubic-inch (6.2 L) 379 had a 4.56 in × 3.86 in (116 mm × 98 mm) bore and stroke. It produced 170 hp (127 kW) net at 3600 RPM and 277 lb⋅ft (376 N⋅m) net torque at 1600 RPM. The 379 was a 351 with a 478 crankshaft.

=== 401 ===
The 400.9-cubic-inch (6.6 L) 401 had a 4.875 in × 3.58 in (123.8 mm × 90.9 mm) bore and stroke. It produced 210 hp (157 kW) gross at 3400 RPM and 377 lb⋅ft (511 N⋅m) gross torque at 1400 RPM, while the Magnum version introduced in 1966 produced 237 hp (177 kW) gross at 4000 RPM and 372 lb⋅ft (504 N⋅m) gross torque at 1600 RPM. The engine was a further enlargement of the 351-cubic-inch (5.8 L) 351 and was produced from 1960 through 1972. This engine was used in the 5500 and 6000 series as well as the H-5000; it was an option in the W-5000 and SP-5000.

=== 432 ===
The 432.3-cubic-inch (7.1 L) 432 had a 4.875 in × 3.86 in (123.8 mm × 98.0 mm) bore and stroke. In 1973 and 1974, it produced 190 hp (142 kW) net at 3200 RPM and 331 lb⋅ft (449 N⋅m) net torque at 1600 RPM in 1973. There was also a version with enlarged crankshaft journals. The 432 was a 401 with a 478 crankshaft. The 432 was a Magnum engine, though it was never designated as such.

=== 478 ===
The 477.7-cubic-inch (7.8 L) 478 had a 5.125 in × 3.86 in (130.2 mm × 98.0 mm) bore and stroke. It produced 192 hp (143 kW) net at 3200 RPM and 371 lb⋅ft (503 N⋅m) net at 1400 RPM. It was one of the largest V6 engines ever built. It was introduced in 1962 for the 6500 series trucks.

== Gasoline V8 ==
=== 637 ===
The 637-cubic-inch (10.4 L) 637 is essentially the V8 version of the 478, sharing the 5.125 in × 3.86 in (130.2 mm × 98.0 mm) bore and stroke and having a single camshaft. It was the largest-displacement production gasoline V8 ever made for highway trucks.

== Gasoline V12 ==
=== 702 ===
The 702-cubic-inch (11.5 L) V12 "Twin Six" had a 4.56 in × 3.58 in (116 mm × 91 mm) bore and stroke. It produced 275 hp (205 kW) gross at 2400 RPM and 630 lb⋅ft (854 N⋅m) gross at 1600 RPM in 1965.

It was offered in 1960 for the 7000 series trucks, and as a special-order option in Canada. It was its own separate engine design, based on a single block casting, which had four exhaust manifolds, two carburetors and intake manifolds, and two distributor caps driven by a single distributor drive, plus other parts from the 351 V6. A total of 56 major parts are interchangeable between the Twin-Six and the other GMC V6 engines to provide greater parts availability and standardization. It produced 275 hp (205 kW) horsepower. Torque was 630 lb⋅ft (854 N⋅m). The 702 was in production until 1966, when it was replaced by the 637 V8. It is estimated that fewer than 5,000 engines were built and that less than 200 exist as of 2021.

== Diesel V6 ==
The naturally aspirated GMC four-stroke diesel engines were added to the General Motors truck line for the 1965 model year. As introduced, the D351, D478, and DH478 all shared the same 17.5:1 compression ratio. Although they shared similar displacement, bore, and stroke dimensions with the gasoline engines, very few parts were the same.

=== D351 ===
The D351 has a 4.56 in × 3.58 in (116 mm × 91 mm) bore and stroke with a total displacement of 351.2 cu in (5.8 L). The cylinder block is a chromium-nickel iron alloy with a 60-degree design. It has a peak gross and net power output of 130 and 118 hp (97 and 88 kW) at 3200 RPM, respectively, and corresponding gross and net torque output of 234 and 223 lb⋅ft (317 and 302 N⋅m) at 2000 RPM, respectively. It was discontinued for the 1967 model year.

=== D478 ===
The D478 has a 5.125 in × 3.86 in (130.2 mm × 98.0 mm) bore and stroke with a total displacement of 477.7 cu in (7.8 L). It may be regarded as a de-tuned DH478. The cylinder block is a chromium-nickel iron alloy with a 60-degree design. It has a peak gross and net power output of 150 and 135 hp (112 and 101 kW) at 3200 RPM, respectively, and corresponding gross and net torque output of 275 and 266 lb⋅ft (373 and 361 N⋅m) at 2000 RPM, respectively.

=== DH478 ===
The DH478 shares the same 5.125 in × 3.86 in (130.2 mm × 98.0 mm) bore and stroke as the D478 with a total displacement of 477.7 cu in (7.8 L). The primary difference is the DH478 has an oil cooler standard, which is optional on the D478. The cylinder block is a chromium-nickel iron alloy with a 60-degree design. It has a peak gross and net power output of 170 and 155 hp (127 and 116 kW) at 3200 RPM, respectively, and corresponding gross and net torque output of 310 and 290 lb⋅ft (420 and 390 N⋅m) at 2000 RPM, respectively.

== Diesel V8 ==
The D637 and DH637 also share the same 17.5:1 compression ratio with their diesel V6 counterparts, introduced in 1966 on the 70-series trucks as an alternative to the established two-stroke Detroit Diesel 6V-53N.

=== D637 ===
Like the gasoline 637, the D637 shares the same 5.125 in × 3.86 in (130.2 mm × 98.0 mm) bore and stroke as the D478 with a total displacement of 637 cu in (10.4 L). It was introduced in 1966, featuring a gross and net peak power output of 195 and 185 hp (145 and 138 kW) at 2600 RPM, respectively, and peak torque of 450 and 440 lb⋅ft (610 and 600 N⋅m) at 1800 RPM, respectively.

=== DH637 ===
The DH637 is an uprated version of the D637, with slightly higher redline. Its gross and net peak power outputs are 220 and 205 hp (164 and 153 kW) at 2800 RPM, respectively, and peak torque outputs are 458 and 444 lb⋅ft (621 and 602 N⋅m) at 2000 RPM, respectively.

== See also ==
- GMC straight-6 engine
- GMC V8 engine
- List of GM engines
- 1960–1966 GMC Truck Club
