= Flint Engine Operations =

- Operated: 2002–present
- Location: 2100 Bristol Road; Flint, Michigan
- Coordinates: 42°55′57″N 83°38′42″W
- Industry: Automotive
- Products: Engines
- Employees: 706 (2022)
- Volume: 1,165,212 sq ft (108,250 m^{2})
- Owner: General Motors
- Website: gm.com/flint-engine

Flint Engine Operations (previously, Flint Engine South) is a General Motors automobile engine factory in Flint, Michigan. The plant opened in 2002 and is named to replace the Flint North engine plant. The plant currently produces the small four-cylinder SGE and Duramax I6 engines. The factory receives cast engine blocks from Defiance Foundry in Defiance, Ohio and Saginaw Metal Casting Operations in Saginaw, Michigan. It replaced Flint North.

== History ==
Flint Engine South began operations in 2002. It produced inline five and six cylinder versions of the GM Atlas engine until that engine line was discontinued in 2009 alongside the GMT360 platform. Shortly after Flint Engine South was completed, Powertrain Flint (a.k.a. Flint North) was closed and demolished.

Flint Engine South also produced 3.6L High Feature DOHC V6 engines (HFV6) for the Chevrolet Traverse, Buick Enclave, and GMC Acadia crossover utility vehicles and Cadillac CTS and STS sedans. High Feature engines were produced in the northern half of the plant.

On September 25, 2008, GM announced a $370 million investment to build another engine plant at the Flint South complex. The new plant was designed to produce the 1.4L GM Family 0 engine ("FamZero") for the Chevrolet Cruze and Volt models beginning in 2010. However, major work was suspended that December as the automotive industry crisis worsened, eventually resulting in the General Motors Chapter 11 reorganization of 2009. By February 2009, GM announced that rather than a new plant, the existing plant would be retooled for FamZero. That October, GM announced it was investing $200 million to complete the retooling, with production scheduled to start in late 2010. In November 2010, GM announced additional investments in Flint to increase production to a planned 1,200 FamZero engines per day by the end of 2012.

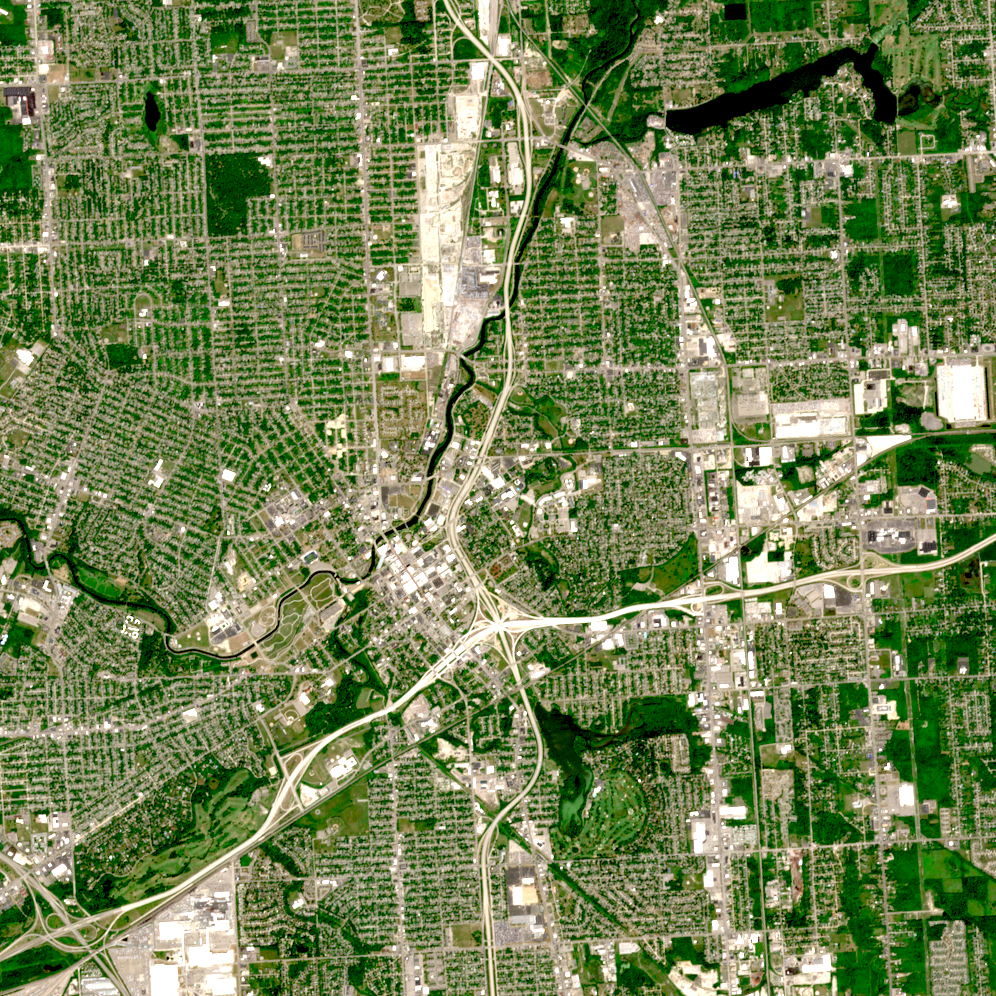
Satellite photograph of Flint, showing the former Buick City (top center) and Flint Engine Operations (bottom center)

The plant was renamed to Flint Engine Operations in approximately 2011. GM announced a $215 million investment in 2013 for the Flint plant, which included plans to retool and upgrade the plant to accommodate production of the new GM small gasoline engine (SGE) and updated HFV6 engines; the SGE was scheduled to replace the FamZero. When the second-generation Chevrolet Colorado was unveiled for North America that November, GM announced the optional 3.6L HFV6 engine would be built at Flint. By 2015, Flint Engine Operations had built one million FamZero engines, shortly before shifting production to the 1.5L SGE I4 "Ecotec".

In January 2018, GM announced it would assemble the Duramax I6 engine at Flint Engine Operations. Five years later, in January 2023, GM announced it would invest $579 million to add an assembly line at Flint for the sixth-generation small-block V8 gasoline engines.

== Products ==
- 1.5L SGE Turbo I4 "Ecotec"
- 3.0L Turbodiesel I6 LM2 & LZ0 "Baby Duramax"

=== Former products ===
- 1.4L I4 LUU "Voltec"
- 1.4L Turbo I4 LUJ / LUV "FamZero"
- 3.6L DI V6 LY7 & LFX "High Feature"
- 3.7L I5 LLR "Vortec 3700"
- 4.2L I6 LL8 "Vortec 4200"

=== Product applications ===
As of September 2022:

- Chevrolet Malibu
- Chevrolet Silverado
- Chevrolet Suburban
- Chevrolet Tahoe
- GMC Sierra
- GMC Yukon
- GMC Yukon XL
- Cadillac Escalade
- Cadillac Escalade ESV
