= Flint North =

Coordinates: 43°3′23.21″N 83°40′51.27″W

GM Powertrain Flint North (GMPT Flint North) was a General Motors automobile engine and components plant located at the Stewart Avenue exit of I-475 in Flint, Michigan. The plant consisted of several factories that combine to make the Flint North Powertrain plant.

== History ==
The 4,000,000-square-foot (370,000 m^{2}) plant opened in 1905 as part of the large Buick Motor Company facilities in Flint. The Factory 36 building was completed in 1951 and had 1,130,000 ft^{2} (105,000 m^{2}) of floor area, producing both V8 and V6 engines. The factory received cast engine blocks from Defiance Foundry in Defiance, Ohio and Saginaw Metal Casting Operations in Saginaw, Michigan. The employees of Powertrain Flint North were represented by UAW Local 599.

Engine component manufacturing was shifted from Factory 31 to Factory 36 in 2004. The engine plant (Factory 36) portion of Powertrain Flint North closed in 2008. It is famous for building the GM 3800 engine, one of the longest-produced automobile engines in history; the final 3800 was produced on August 22, 2008. Shortly after its closure, scavengers stole an estimated US$100,000 of metal and wire from the building. The last employees left the site on October 30, 2010.

The remaining factories (5, 9, 10, 14, 25, 29, 75 and 81) which composed the maintenance, sanitation and component-producing buildings of the plant, closed permanently on December 6, 2010.

With its closure in 2010, Powertrain Flint North was the last operating plant at the century-old Buick City factory complex. It was replaced by Flint Engine South, which had begun production in 2002.

== Products ==
- Buick V6 engine (3800)

== See also ==
- List of GM factories
