= GMC straight-6 engine =

Overview
- Manufacturer: General Motors
- Production: 1939–1962

Layout
- Configuration: straight-6
- Displacement: 228–503 cu in (3.7–8.2 L)
- Cylinder block material: cast iron
- Cylinder head material: cast iron
- Valvetrain: OHV, 2 valves per cylinder

Combustion
- Fuel system: Carburetor
- Fuel type: Gasoline
- Cooling system: Water-cooled

Chronology
- Predecessor: Buick Straight-6 engine 223 cu in Pontiac straight-6 230 cu in Oldsmobile straight-6
- Successor: 324 cu in Oldsmobile V8; GMC V6 engine Chevrolet Turbo-Thrift engine

The GMC straight-6 engine was a series of gasoline-powered straight-six engines introduced in the 1939 model year by the GMC Trucks division of General Motors. Prior to the introduction of this new engine design GMC trucks had been powered by straight-six engines designed by the Buick, Pontiac and Oldsmobile divisions of GM.

The new engine family featured a valve-in-head design, pioneered by Buick and also used by the Chevrolet division's contemporary "Stovebolt Six" engine. Many displacements were produced using three block sizes: "Group 1" (small), "Group 2" (mid-size) and "Group 3" (large).

The straight-6 engine was replaced by the GMC V6 engine in 1960, remaining in use only in certain light-duty models of the P-series step van until 1962.

== Group 1 ==
The Group 1 engines were the smallest in displacement and outer dimensions, and differed most significantly from the larger Group 2 and Group 3 engines by having only four main bearings (whereas the Group 2 and 3 engines had seven) and a different firing order (1-5-3-6-2-4, whereas the others are 1-4-2-6-3-5).

=== 228 ===
GMC replaced the Pontiac 223 with their own 228-cubic-inch (3.7 L) 228 in 1939. This OHV (overhead valve) engine was produced through 1953. With a cylinder bore of 3.5625 inches (90.49 mm), this is the smallest low-deck engine. All four low-deck engines have a stroke of 3.8125 inches (96.84 mm) and used 7 inch long connecting rods.

=== 236 ===
The 236-cubic-inch (3.9 L) 236 was introduced in 1941 and only in limited production through World War II. This is a low-deck engine, with 3 13/16 inches (97 mm) stroke and 3 5/8 inches (92 mm) bore. Production ended in 1946.

=== 248 ===
The 248-cubic-inch (4.1 L) 248 was released in 1939 alongside the 228. The 248 was similar to the 236. The bore was 3.71875 inches (94.456 mm). Stroke is 3.8125. Power in 1955 listed as 100 HP @ 3100 rpm; torque 202 lb ft @ 1000 rpm. The 248 was discontinued in 1955.

=== 256 ===
The 256-cubic-inch (4.2 L) 256 was similar to the 236 and 248. It was also an OHV/pushrod engine, and was built for just two years, 1940 and 1941. This is the largest low deck engine. Bore was 3.78125 and stroke was 3.8125. Power listed as 91 Net HP @ 3000 rpm; torque 201 Net lb ft @ 1000 rpm.

=== 270 ===
The last GMC-only straight six was the 270-cubic-inch (4.4 L) 270. It was produced from 1941 through 1963, and was an OHV/pushrod engine. This is a raised-deck engine. The bore was 3.78125" (same as 256) and stroke was 4 inches (101.6 mm). Power listed in 1963 as 133 HP @ 3600 rpm; torque 244 lb ft @ 1300 rpm.

=== 302 ===
The 301.6-cubic-inch (4.9 L) GMC inline six was produced from 1952 to 1960, when it was replaced by the V6. It has a square bore/stroke ratio of 4 by 4 inches (101.6 mm × 101.6 mm). This is the largest raised-deck engine. It was originally designed for the GMC military M135 and M211. It was used in military 2 1/2-ton trucks with the Hydramatic transmission; however, the engine was a sealed engine for snorkel/submersion use, had an electric fuel pump, and other features such as a deep sump oil pan. From 1952 to 1959, GMC manufactured the civilian 302 engine, which was not sealed, had a mechanical fuel pump, and used a standard oil pan. Power listed in 1959-160 HP @ 3600 rpm; torque 268 lb ft @ 1600 rpm. This engine was popular with hotrod enthusiasts because it delivered tremendous power for an inline six engine at the time (although now obsolete), is built with a heavy cast block, and can take quite a bit of abuse.

== Group 2 ==
=== 278 ===
The 278-cubic-inch (4.6 L) 278 was released in 1939 alongside the 308, sharing the same 4 1/2 inches (110 mm) stroke but with a 3 5/8 inches (92 mm) bore. It produced a maximum 110 hp @ 3000 rpm and 230 lb•ft @ 1000 rpm. The 278 was discontinued in 1946.

=== 308 ===
The 308-cubic-inch (5.0 L) 308 was released in 1939 alongside the 278, sharing the same 4 1/2 inches (110 mm) stroke but with a 3 13/16 inches (97 mm) bore. It produced a maximum 122 hp @ 3200 rpm and 241 lb•ft @ 1000 rpm. The 308 was discontinued in 1949 and replaced by the 318.

=== 318 ===
The 318-cubic-inch (5.2 L) 318 was released in 1950, replacing the 308. It shared the same 4 1/2 inches (110 mm) stroke as its predecessors but with a slightly larger 3 7/8 inches (98 mm) bore. It produced a maximum 136 hp @ 3400 rpm and 245 lb•ft @ 1400 rpm. The 318 was discontinued in 1954 and replaced by the 324 cubic inch Oldsmobile V8.

=== 360 ===
The 361-cubic-inch (5.9 L) 360 was released in 1950, replacing the physically larger 361 "Group 3" engine. The 360 and 361 shared the exact same 4 1/8 inches (100 mm) bore and 4 1/2 inches (110 mm) stroke, but the 360 used the mid-size "Group 2" block. It produced a maximum 127 hp @ 3000 rpm and 289 lb•ft @ 1300 rpm. The 360 was discontinued in 1955 and replaced by the 324 cubic inch Oldsmobile V8.

== Group 3 ==
=== 361 ===
The 361-cubic-inch (5.9 L) 361 was released in 1939 alongside the 426 and 451. The 361 was discontinued in 1949 and replaced by the 360 "Group 2" engine. The 360 and 361 shared the exact same 4 1/8 inches (100 mm) bore and 4 1/2 inches (110 mm) stroke, but the 361 used the larger "Group 3" block. It produced a maximum 136 hp @ 3000 rpm and 273 lb•ft @ 1000 rpm.

=== 426 ===
The 425.6 cubic inches (7.0 L) with a bore and stroke of 4.25 by 5 inches (108 mm × 127 mm) GMC inline six appeared in 1940s 4x4 Cab Over Engine (COE) trucks made in Pontiac, MI. Power ratings for 1955 were 190 HP @ 3200 rpm; torque 350 lb ft @ 1000 rpm. It also appeared in large GMC trucks in the 1950s ending in 1955.

=== 451 ===
The 451-cubic-inch (7.4 L) 451 was released in 1939 alongside the 361 and 426. It was the largest in the GMC straight-6 line until the 477 debuted late in the 1940 model year. It shares the same 5 inches (130 mm) stroke as the 426 and 477, with a 4 3/8 inches (110 mm) bore. It produced a maximum 146 hp @ 2400 rpm and 350 lb•ft @ 1000 rpm. It was replaced by the 477 and ceased production at the beginning of 1942.

=== 477 ===
The 477-cubic-inch (7.8 L) 477 was released late in the 1940 model year, replacing the 451. It was the largest in the GMC straight-6 line until it was replaced by the 503 in 1950. It shares the same 5 inches (130 mm) stroke as the 426 and 451, with a 4 1/2 inches (110 mm) bore. It produced a maximum 154 hp @ 2600 rpm and 385 lb•ft @ 1000 rpm.

=== 503 ===
The 502.7-cubic-inch (8.2 L); 4 9/16 by 5 1/8 inches (115.9 mm × 130.2 mm) GMC inline six was more numerous than the 426 inline six, starting in 1950 and ending with the 1959 model year. In the 1957-1959 model years this engine was listed as 225 HP@3200 rpm and 436 lb ft torque @ 1200 rpm. The GMC 630, 660, 720, and 750 Series of the 1950s offered the 503.

== See also ==
- List of GM engines
- GMC V6 engine
- GMC V8 engine
- General Motors Atlas engine#LL8 (Vortec 4200)
- Duramax I6 engine
