= Buick City =

Car factory in Flint, Michigan (1904–1999)

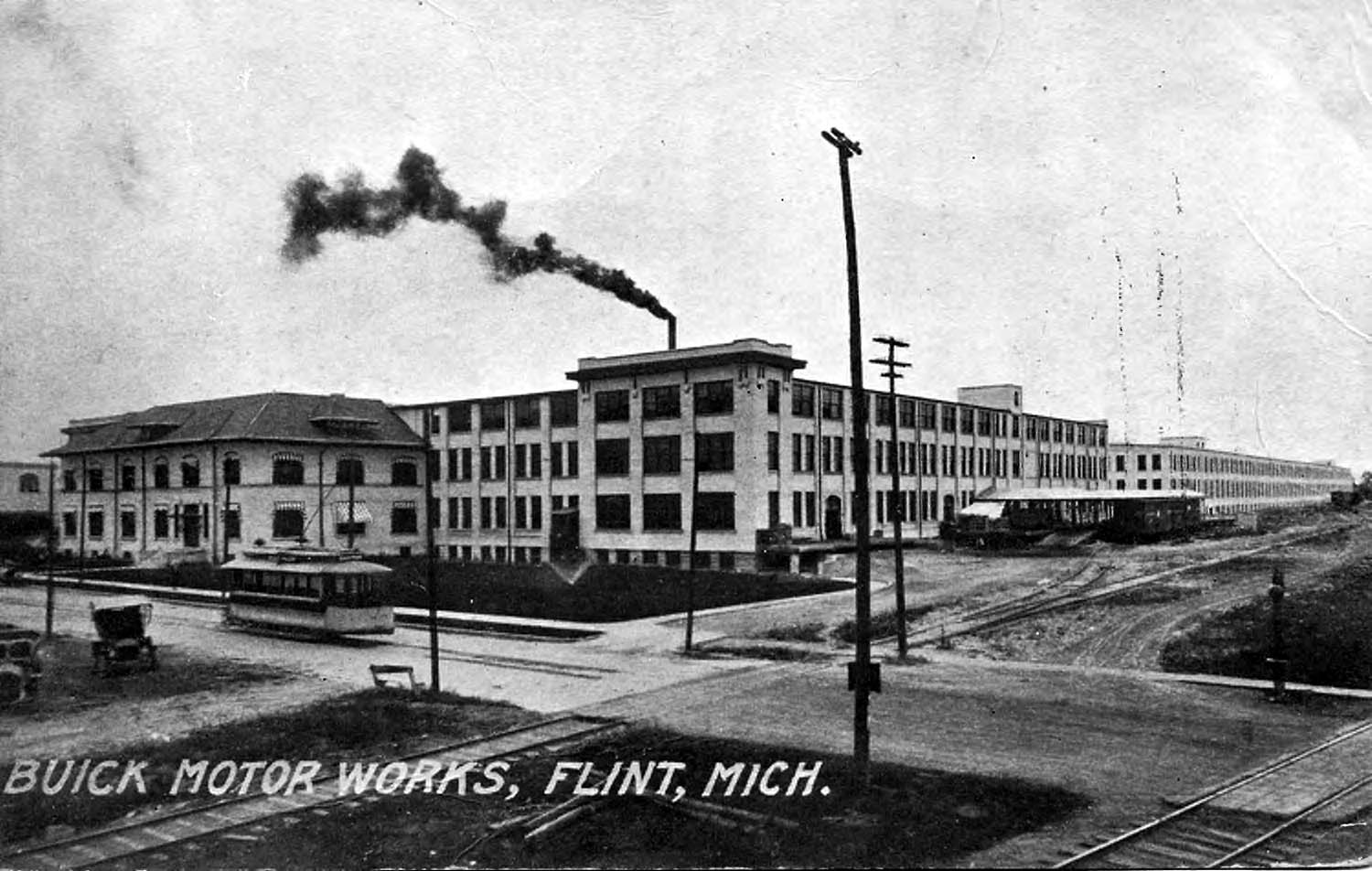
- The Buick Motor Works in 1907
- Built: 1904
- Operated: 1904–1999
- Location: Leith St.; Flint, Michigan
- Coordinates: 43.048°N 83.68483°W
- Industry: Automotive
- Products: Little and Buick automobiles
- Area: 235-acre (950,000 m^{2})
- Owners: Flint Wagon (1904–1911); General Motors (1911–2010)
- Defunct: June 1999; 27 years ago

Buick City was a massive, vertically-integrated automobile manufacturing complex in northeast Flint, Michigan, which served the Buick home plant between 1904 and 1999. In the early 1980s, after major renovations were completed to better compete with Japanese producers, the plant was renamed to "Buick City".

== History ==
From 1904 to its closure in 1999, Buick City was the central plant for Buick and one of General Motors' largest factories; for those years, the majority of Buick automobiles were produced at Buick City.

The original factory at one time was the largest in the world, consisting of 24 separate buildings contributing to the manufacturing process, until 1928 when the Ford River Rouge Complex was completed and began operations. In the beginning, all components were manufactured in one location, to include wheel bearings, nuts, bolts, and screws, to transmissions, suspension components, wheels and interior components. Operations were carried out in this fashion well into the 1940s and beyond.

=== Origins ===
Elements of the 235-acre (950,000 m^{2}) complex dated from before 1904, when it was known as Flint Wagon Works; the first manufacturing operations at the site started in 1898 after Billy Durant and Josiah Dallas Dort purchased the Imperial Wheel Company and moved its factory to the intersection of Hamilton Avenue and St. John Street (now James P. Cole Blvd). After Flint Wagon Works purchased Buick Motor Company in September 1903, Buick's operations were relocated to a location in Flint, on Hamilton between Industrial and St. John, producing 16 cars in 1903 and 37 in 1904.

=== Home plant ===
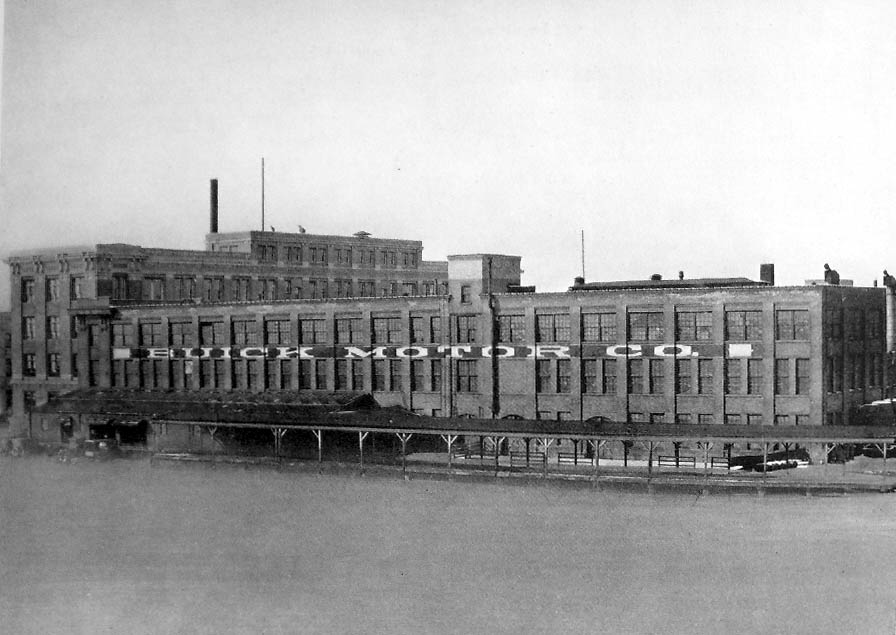
Buick factory main building c. 1906

The plant originated with Buick before the formation of General Motors. Other elements were built by early manufacturers and suppliers like Fisher Body. General Motors was founded in 1908, including Buick, which produced 30,000 cars in Flint for 1910. After General Motors assumed operations, the factory was expanded to accommodate the manufacturing and assembly of Buick vehicles and components. For more than 80 years, it was Buick's "home plant" and built the majority of models in the lineup.

By 1915, the Durant/Dort Carriage Company had ceased operations, including the Imperial Wheel Works division; its buildings, near the northeast corner of Industrial and Hamilton, were incorporated into Buick, which started expanding north. In 1918, Buick switched production to the Liberty L-12 engine in Flint, supporting manufacturing for military aircraft and vehicles used in World War I. By 1923, Buick had produced one million cars.

Car production stopped from 1942 to 1946 as GM plants switched over to producing trucks, tanks, and aircraft; Buick specialized in making the M18 Hellcat, the fastest tank destroyer of the entire war. After World War II, when vehicle production resumed, Buick City was the primary location where all components were created, with knock-down kits distributed to assembly plants in major metropolitan US cities, where the vehicles were locally assembled and distributed in their respective regions.

=== "Buick City" ===
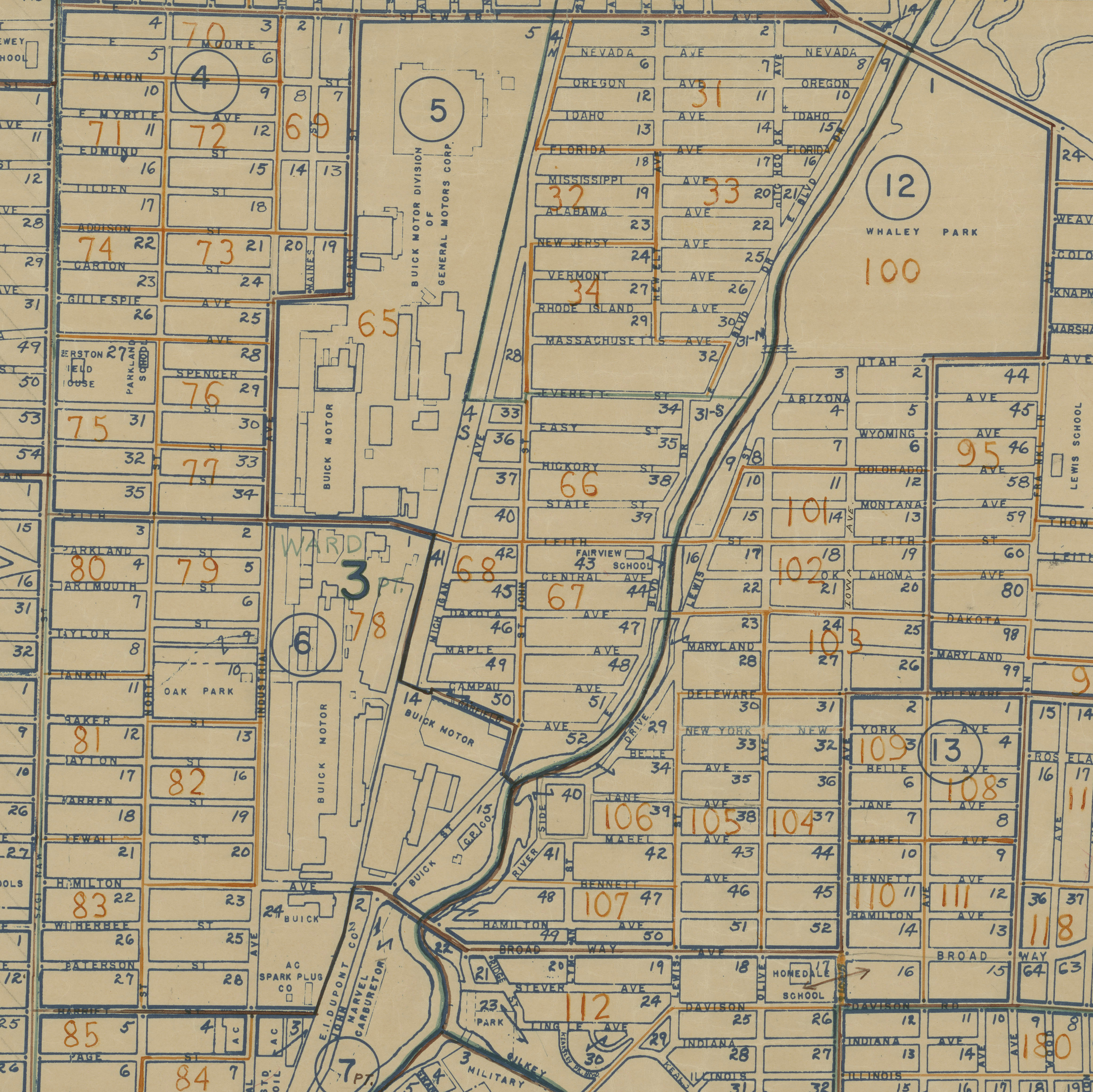
Map showing Buick division headquarters and factory, 1950

Buick built rear-wheel drive A-body Regals, B-body LeSabres, and C-body Electras at the Flint campus; however, GM considered moving vehicle production to a newer facility that was scheduled to open in 1985. In response, a senior administrator wrote the Buick City business plan, which was adopted in 1982. After several updates and a US$350 million investment, it was christened "Buick City" in September 1985, GM's answer to Toyota City, adopting the latter's high technology, just-in-time manufacturing methods, labor-management cooperation, and inventory control. Production of Buick and Oldsmobile H-body cars was scheduled to commence at Buick City for the 1986 model year.

The Buick City concept represented a successful attempt by General Motors to compete with Japanese manufacturers; the 1989 Buick LeSabre built in Buick City was the top-ranked car in the J.D. Power and Associates customer satisfaction survey for that year; it was the first American built car to appear on the list.

For the engine assembly plant (Factory 36), the engine block and cylinder heads were cast at Defiance Foundry in Defiance, Ohio and earlier at Saginaw Metal Casting Operations in Saginaw, Michigan.

=== Closure and demolition ===
At the end of 1986, General Motors announced that 11 manufacturing plants would be closed by 1989; (Note: In Flint specifically, GM announced in November 1986 that two plants would be closed by the end of 1987: Flint Body (4,500 employees); Truck & Bus Flint (3,450).) this put 35,000 of the 150,000 Flint residents out of work, and the subsequent economic toll on the community was chronicled in Michael Moore's 1989 documentary film, Roger & Me, although the closure of Buick City would not start until a decade after the film was released.

Citing declining sedan sales, General Motors announced in 1997 the Buick City plant would close; the last day of vehicle assembly plant operations was June 29, 1999. That same year, Buick City won J. D. Power's Platinum Award for assembly plant quality. As of 2016, it is the only General Motors plant to win the award. The final cars built at Buick City were the Pontiac Bonneville and the Buick LeSabre. Full-size sedan manufacturing was consolidated at Orion Assembly.

Vehicle engines and components continued to be manufactured in the northern part of the site, renamed General Motors Powertrain Flint North, for approximately another decade; however, the remainder of Buick City was vacated by GM employees and site responsibilities were transferred to Motors Liquidation Company as of December 6, 2010. In 2013, American Cast Iron Pipe Company announced plans to construct a new 200,000 square foot manufacturing plant on the former Buick City complex.

=== Reuse ===
The plant's acreage became an EPA cleanup site.

In August 2018, a 156,000-square-foot Lear Corporation seat manufacturing facility opened, built on 33 acres of the former Buick City site in Flint.

== Site ==
Key locations for Buick City
1 N/Building 38 [warehouse]
2 N/Factory 36 [engines]
3 N/Factory 05 (Bldgs 43, 65, 99) [transmission components]
4 N/Factory 10 (Bldg 20) [transmissions]
5 N/Factory 03 (Bldg 30) [coil springs]
6 N/Factory 81 (Bldgs 69–74) [torque converters]
7 N/Factory 83/84 (Bldgs 11, 32, 66, 83) [engine components]
8 N/Bldgs 15, 61, 85 [site support & labs]
9 N/Building 07 [steam plant]
10 S/Factory 86 (Bldgs 03, 04, 08, 10, 12, 16, 23, 29, 40, 44, 94) [vehicle assembly]
11 S/Factory 28 (Bldgs 17, 28, 84) [powertrain development]
12 S/Building 01 [administration]

The Buick City site occupies 412.947 acres (167.114 ha), bounded approximately by E Pierson Rd (to the north), Saginaw, North, Industrial, and Andrew/Horton (to the west), E Hamilton Ave (to the south), and CSX Railroad and James P Cole Blvd (to the east). It is divided into the Northend (north of Leith) and Southend (south of Leith). Automobile manufacturing activities in the Southend ceased in 1999 and the buildings were demolished by 2002; the Northend continued manufacturing automotive parts and components until 2010, and most buildings there were demolished by 2012.

=== Structures ===
Building 01 (administration)

Building 01, built in 1968, was a three-story building with approximately 300,000 ft^{2} (28,000 m^{2}) of floor space, used solely as an administration building with no manufacturing operations.

Factory 03 (coil springs)

Factory 03 encompassed Building 30 and its annexes (30A, 30B, 30C, 30D, 30E, and 30F), approximately 205,000 ft^{2} (19,000 m^{2}) in total, used to manufacture coil springs.

Factory 05 (transmission components)

Factory 05 was Building 43, with approximately 650,000 ft^{2} (60,000 m^{2}) of floor space used for manufacturing transmission components.

Building 07 (steam plant)

Building 07 housed three fossil-fired boilers (coal or natural gas) to generate process steam and compressed air for site operations. Each boiler produced up to 400,000 lb/h (180,000 kg/h) of steam at 200 psi (1,400 kPa) [gage]. It had approximately 170,000 ft^{2} (16,000 m^{2}) of floor area.

Factory 10 (transmissions)

Factory 10 encompasses Buildings 20, 22, and 24; Building 20 had approximately 700,000 ft^{2} (65,000 m^{2}) of floor area and was used as an aluminum foundry during World War II, then as the Dynaflow transmission assembly plant.

Buildings 15, 61, 61A, and 85 (facilities / laboratories)

These buildings collectively had approximately 225,000 ft^{2} (20,900 m^{2}) of space and were used for site facilities engineering, maintenance and construction, and Powertrain laboratories.

Factory 36 (engines)

Factory (Building) 36 had approximately 1,100,000 ft^{2} (100,000 m^{2}) of floor area and was used for machining, assembly, and testing of vehicle engines and engine components.

Building 38 (warehouse)

Building 38 had slightly more than 200,000 ft^{2} (19,000 m^{2}) of floor area and was used as a warehouse for vehicle engines and engine parts, Product Evaluation Program car cleaning, and light vehicle repair.

Factory 81 (torque converters)

Factory 81 encompassed Buildings 69, 70, 71, 72, 73, and 74 along with their respective annexes. Prior to 1981, these were used as a gray iron foundry; after remodeling that year, it was converted to a manufacturing and assembly plant for torque converters.

Factory 83/84 (aka Factory 31, engine components)

Factory 83/84 included 950,000 ft^{2} (88,000 m^{2}) of building space, divided between Buildings 11, 32, 66, and 83. Prior to 1981, it was used to manufacture front and rear axles; after the remodeling, it built "white metal" engine components, including pistons, water pumps, and manifolds. This is also known as Factory 31. Building 11 was the first built under General Motors, completed in 1909 for US$1 million. Engine component manufacturing was moved to Factory 36 in 2004.

Factory 86 (vehicle assembly)

Factory 86 encompasses Buildings 03, 04, 08, 10, 12, 16, 23, 29, 40, 44, and 94, collectively with 1,800,000 ft^{2} (170,000 m^{2}) of space, used for vehicle assembly, testing, and storage. Building 04, completed in 1947, was used for final assembly, with 435,000 ft^{2} (40,400 m^{2}) of space; Building 16 also was used for final assembly, with 194,000 ft^{2} (18,000 m^{2}) of space. Building 44 was the paint shop, with 113,000 ft^{2} (10,500 m^{2}) of space, completed in 1977. Building 08 was completed in 1972 and used for final car preparation.

Building 40 was used for wheel and tire assembly and storage for blemished body parts. Building 12 was the body shop, where underbody assembly and body panel manufacturing was carried out.

Factory 94 (drivetrain development)

Factory 94 encompasses 650,000 ft^{2} (60,000 m^{2}) of total area in Buildings 17, 28, and 84; it was used for engine and drivetrain development and testing. Buildings 28 and 84 were used for GM Powertrain V-6 Engineering.

Buick City factory buildings
Bldg	Site	Name	Built	Notes
01	S	Transmission Plant	1906	Demolished before 2000
01	S	Administration	1968	
02	S	Former Plastics Plant	1917	Expanded in 1943 (02A) and 1979 (02C) for Material Handling Storage
03	S	Drop Forge	1908	Demolished before 2000
03	S	Car Loading/Rail Shipping	1965	
04	S	Body Plant	before 1906	Demolished before 2000
04	S	Buick City Assembly	1947	
05	S	Enameling	1914	Demolished before 2000
05	S	South Primary Substation	1967	
06	S	Assembly	1907	Demolished before 2000
06	N	North Primary Substation	1967	
07	S	Main Office and Administration	1917	Demolished before 2000
07	N	Powerhouse	1973, 1983	
08	S	Laboratory and Garage	1908	Demolished before 2000
08	S	Buick City Final Assembly	1972	
09	S	Fueling Station	1919	Demolished before 2000
09	S	Facilities Engineering	1977	
10	S	Assembly	1909	Demolished before 2000
10	S	Car Marshalling - Repair & Shipping	1978	
11	N	Powertrain Components	1909	
12	S	Buick City Final Assembly	1910	Expanded in 1938 (12A), 1965 (12C), 1985 (12E), and 1984 (12F-Receiving Dock and 12G-Body Fabrication)
14	S	Central Power House	1920	Demolished before 2000
15	N	Facilities Engineering	1919	
16	N	Central Stores	1909	Demolished before 2000
16	S	Buick City Final Assembly	1946	Expanded in 1972 (16A) and 1985 (16B)
17	S	Storage	1919	Expanded in 1940 (17A, Truck Garage & Vehicle Storage)
18	S	Parts Department and Paint	before 1902	Demolished before 2000
J2 (18)	S	Store Shed	before 1921	Demolished before 2000
18	S	Personnel	1975	
19	N	Housing	1919	Demolished before 2000
20	N	Iron Foundry	1916	Demolished before 2000
20	N	Transmission Machining and Subassemblies	1942	
21	N	Central Tool Grinding and Heat Treat	1917	
22	N	Pyralin Storage	1919	Demolished before 2000
22	N	Compressor Station	1942	
23	N	Heat Treat	1916–1920	Demolished before 2000
23	S	Former Tool Making & Heat Treat	1945	
24	N	Motor Block Test	1920	Demolished before 2000
24	N	North Fire Protection Pump House	1970	
25	N	Transformer House	1920	Demolished before 2000
26	S	Boiler and Gas House	1907–1913	Demolished before 2000
27	N	Liberty Engine Plant	1912–1919	Demolished before 2000
28	S	Powertrain Facility Support	1918	
29	S	Former Tool Manufacturing	1918	
30	N	Spring Plant	1918	Expanded in 1946 (30A), 1954 (30B), 1964 (30C), 1965 (30D), 1967 (30E), and 1972 (30F)
31	S	Axle Assembly Plant	1906	Demolished before 2000
32	S	Axle Plant	1907	Demolished before 2000
32	N	Powertrain Components	1966	
33	N	Housing	1912–1919	Demolished before 2000
34	S	Axle Plant	1909	Demolished before 2000
35	S	Axle Plant	1909	Demolished before 2000
36	S	Power House	1909	Demolished before 2000
36	N	Engine Plant	1952	
37	S	Axle Plant	1909	Demolished before 2000
38	S	Axle Plant	1908	Demolished before 2000
38	N	New Car Conditioning and Delivery, Warehousing, and Product Evaluation Program (PEP) Car Storage and Preparation	1964	
39	S	Receiving Shed for Axle Plant	1909	Demolished before 2000
40	S	Buick City Final Assembly	1920	
42	S	Transformer House	1920	Demolished before 2000
43	S	Kitchen	1920	Demolished before 2000
43	N	Transmission Plant	1952	
44	N	Auxiliary Power Plant	1912–1919	Demolished before 2000
44	S	Buick City Final Assembly Paint Shop	1977	
45	N	Sand Storage	1912–1919	Demolished before 2000
46	S	Parts Storage / Auxiliary Power Plant	before 1919	Demolished before 2000
47	S	Sprinkler Valve House	before 1921	Demolished before 2000
48	S	Parts Storage	before 1921	Demolished before 2000
49	S	Former Sawdust Vault	before 1921	Demolished before 2000
50	S	Dry Kiln	1906–1916	Demolished before 2000
51	S	Bending Storage and Welding	before 1912	Demolished before 2000
53	S	Transformer House	1918	Demolished before 2000
54	N	Housing	1912–1919	Demolished before 2000
55	S	Heat Treat	1912–1919	Demolished before 2000
55	N	Waste Treatment	1953	Expanded in 1955 (55A) and 1972 (55B)
57	N	Housing	1912–1919	Demolished before 2000
58	N	Record Storage	1922–1927	Demolished before 2000
59	N	Auxiliary Power Plant	1922–1927	Demolished before 2000
60	S	Main Pump Station	1913	Demolished before 2000
61	N	Facilities Engineering	1923	Expanded in 1944 (61A)
62	S	Assembly & Paint	1923	Demolished before 2000
63	S	Dry Kiln	1916	Demolished before 2000
64	S	Pickling Room	1924	Demolished before 2000
65	S	Personnel	1921	Demolished before 2000
65	N	Compressor Station	1957	
66	N	Crankshaft Machine Shop	1926	Demolished before 2000
66	N	Powertrain Components	1926	Expanded in 1940 (66A and 66B), 1954 (66C), and 1966 (66D)
67	N	Transformer House	1923	Demolished before 2000
68	N	Transformer House	1926	Demolished before 2000
69	N	Torque Converter Plant	1927	Expanded in 1949 (Electrical Substation, 69A), 1951 (Compressor Station, 69B), and 1954 (69C)
70	N	Torque Converter Plant	1927	Expanded in 1945 (70A), 1954 (70B), and 1980 (70C)
71	N	Torque Converter Plant	1926	Expanded in 1944 (71A) and 1952 (71B)
72	N	Torque Converter Plant	1927	
73	N	Torque Converter PLant	1927	Expanded in 1945 (73A) and 1955 (73B)
74	N	Torque Converter Plant	1927	
76	N	Core Sand Knockout Building	1926–1927	Demolished before 2000
77	N	Laboratory	1926–1927	Demolished before 2000
78	S	Engineering & Experimental	1927	Demolished before 2000
79	S	Storage	1922–1927	Demolished before 2000
80	S	Die Storage	1928	Demolished before 2000
83	N	Powertrain Components	1936	Expanded in 1954 (83A)
84	S	Powertrain Components	1939	Expanded in 1978 (84A) and 1981 (84B)
85	N	Facilities Engineering	1937	
86	N	Facilities Engineering	1937	Expanded in 1952 (86A)
94	S	Truck Repair Garage	1941	Expanded in 1945 (94A, Export Processing)
97	N	Fire Department	1943	
99	N	Construction Material Storage	1985	
100	S	New Car Marshalling	1983	
—	S	A.C. Spark Plug Operations	1928	Demolished before 2000
—	N	Fire Control Pumphouse	2000	
