= Duramax I6 engine =

Duramax I-6

Overview
- Manufacturer: General Motors
- Also called: LM2 (until 2024); LZ0 (2023-present)

Layout
- Configuration: Inline 6
- Displacement: 2,993 cubic centimetres (182.6 in^{3})
- Cylinder bore: 84 millimetres (3.3 in)
- Piston stroke: 90 millimetres (3.5 in)
- Cylinder block material: Cast aluminum
- Cylinder head material: Cast aluminum
- Valvetrain: DOHC
- Valvetrain drive system: Chains
- Compression ratio: 15.2: 1

Combustion
- Operating principle: Diesel
- Turbocharger: One
- Fuel system: Common rail direct fuel injection
- Management: GM D1P-E98
- Fuel type: ultra-low-sulfur diesel; B20 biodiesel; EN 590 diesel

Output
- Power output: 277–305 horsepower (207–227 kW)
- Specific power: 92.3-101.7 hp/L
- Torque output: 460–495 pound-feet (624–671 N⋅m)

Dimensions
- Length: 908 millimetres (35.7 in)
- Width: 914 millimetres (36.0 in)
- Height: 903 millimetres (35.6 in)
- Dry weight: 212 kilograms (467 lb)

Emissions
- Emissions target standard: Tier 3 Bin 160

The Duramax I6 engine is a diesel engine available in select models of General Motors light-duty trucks and SUVs. Applications include the Chevrolet Silverado/GMC Sierra 1500, Chevrolet Suburban/GMC Yukon XL, Chevrolet Tahoe/GMC Yukon, and Cadillac Escalade (both short wheelbase and ESV). The engine was developed together with Opel, who are manufacturing three- and four-cylinder versions displacing 1.5 and 2.0 liters, using the same engine architecture.

== Engine details ==
- Displacement: 3.0L
- Configuration: Inline 6
- Horsepower: 277-305 hp @ 3750 rpm
- Torque: 460-495 ft-lb (624-671 nm) @ 1500 rpm
- RPO code: LM2 (until 2024), LZ0 (2023-present)
- Intercooler: liquid-to-air
- Block: Aluminum
- Head: Aluminum
- Crankshaft: Forged Steel
- Rods: Forged
- Pistons: Hypereutetic cast aluminum alloy - LZ0 upgraded to steel pistons
- Cylinder liners: Iron

The engine's timing components are located at the rear of the engine, and feature timing chains to drive the camshafts and high pressure fuel pump, and a wet belt to drive the oil pump. This arrangement makes inspection and replacement very difficult and expensive.

Most of the development and engineering work for the LM2 Duramax, as well as primary calibration took place in Turin, Italy. The engine is being produced at Flint Engine Operations. A test by Car and Driver showed 40 MPG is possible when hypermiling.
