= Buick Super =

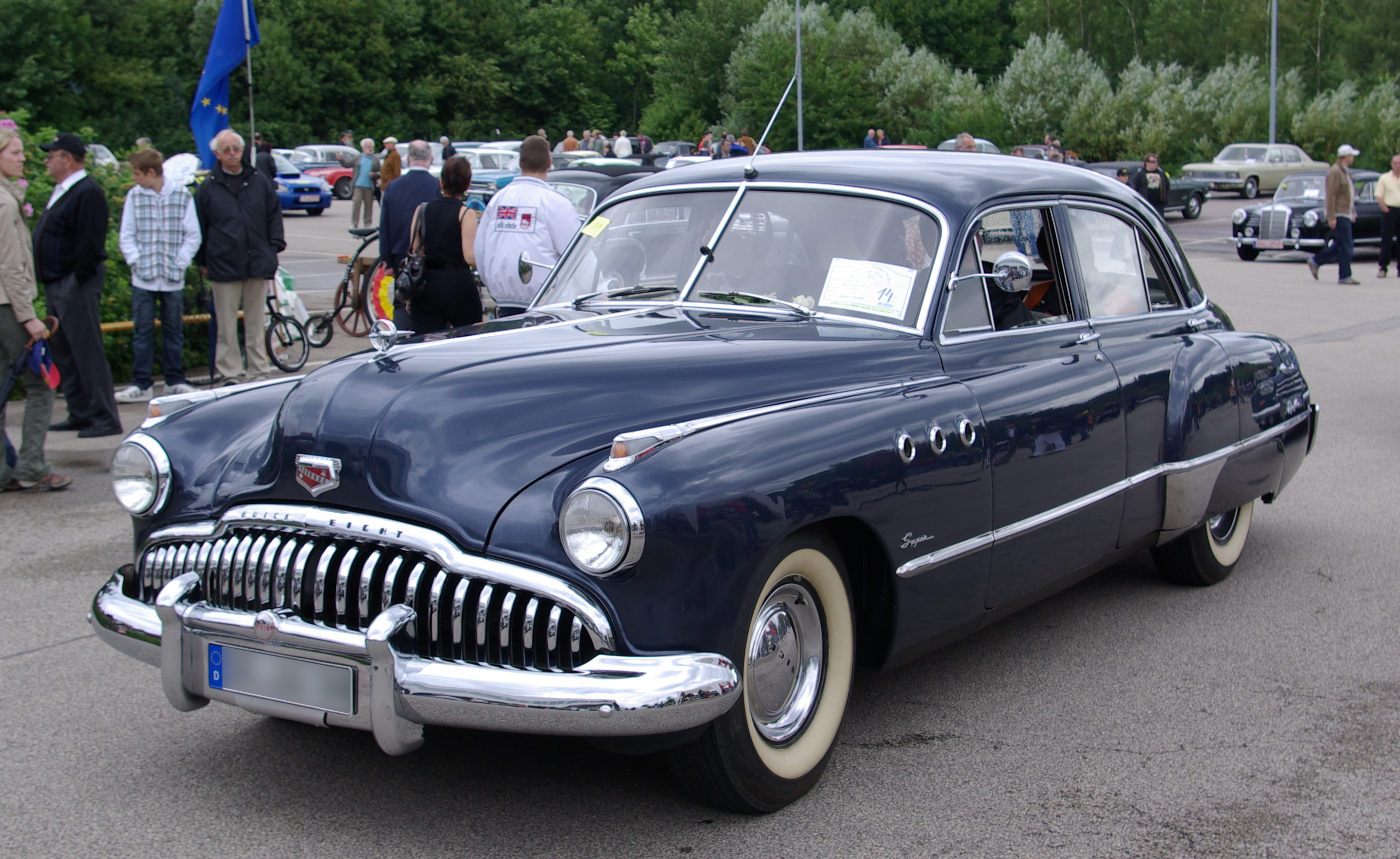
- 1949 Buick Super 4-Door Sedan

Overview
- Manufacturer: Buick (General Motors)
- Production: 1930–1935; 1940–1942; 1946–1958
- Designer: Harley Earl

Body and chassis
- Class: Full-size
- Layout: FR layout
- Platform: C-body

Chronology
- Predecessor: Buick Standard Six

The Buick Super is a full-sized automobile produced by Buick from 1940 through the 1958 model years, with a brief hiatus from 1943 through 1945. The first generation shared the longer wheelbase with the top level Roadmaster while offering the smaller displacement engine from the Buick Special. The Super prioritized passenger comfort over engine performance. For several years, it was called the "Buick Eight" or "Super Eight" due to the engravement on the grille while all Buick's since 1931 were all installed with the Buick Straight-8 engine with varying engine displacement.

Super returned as a performance trim level on V8-powered LaCrosse and Lucerne sedans from 2008 until 2011.

== Series 50 (1930–1935) ==
Series 50
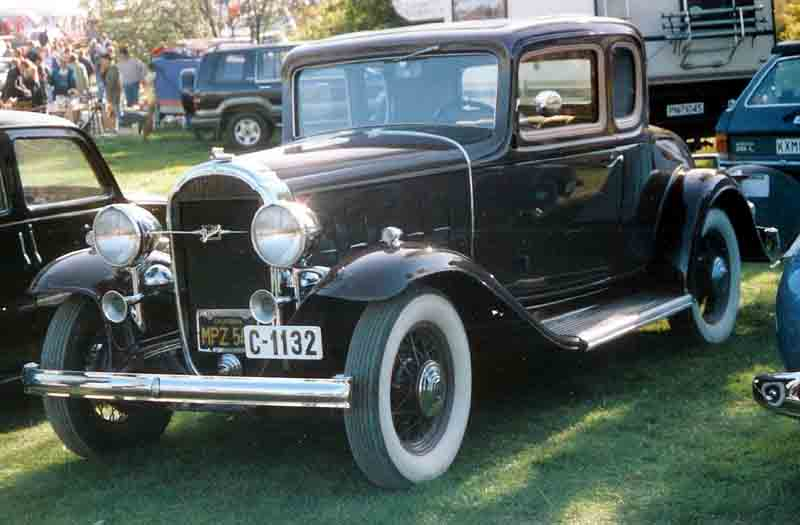
- 1932 Buick Series 50 Model 56 Business Coupe

Overview
- Model years: 1930–1935
- Assembly: Flint, Michigan, USA (Buick City)
- Designer: Harley Earl

Body and chassis
- Body style: 2-door coupe 2-door convertible 4-door phaeton 4-door sedan
- Layout: Front-engine, rear-wheel-drive
- Platform: GM C platform

Powertrain
- Engine: 331.4 cu in (5.4 L) Buick Straight-6 engine OHV I6; 220.7 cu in (3.6 L) Buick Straight-8 engine OHV I8; 230.4 cu in (3.8 L) Buick Straight-8 engine OHV I8
- Transmission: 3-speed synchromesh manual

Dimensions
- Wheelbase: 114 in (2,896 mm); 119 in (3,023 mm); 124 in (3,150 mm)

Originally the Series 50 had a 331.4 cu in (5,431 cc) Buick Straight-6 engine developing 99 bhp of power at 2,800 rpm, and Buick manufactured 28,204 cars. In 1930 all Buicks were installed with the all-new Straight-eight, and the 1931 the model remained almost unchanged, aside from minor appearance changes. With the introduction of the Marquette Companion brand as a junior brand to Buick, all Buicks were repositioned upmarket as junior luxury brands to Cadillac, while priced more modestly to the Cadillac junior brand LaSalle. Optionally, the model was equipped with the new 220.7 cu in (3,617 cc) Buick Straight-8 engine and 77 hp. With the temporary disappearance of the Series 40, Series 50 became the entry-level model for Buick. All bodywork was provided by Fisher Body and the appearance originated from the GM Art and Color Section headed by Harley Earl was now used across all GM products. Only two coachwork choices were available leaving the choice between a coupe or sedan listed at US$1,540 ($29,680 in 2025 dollars).

In 1932 the straight eight engine displacement increased to 230.4 cu in (3,776 cc), producing 82.5 bhp, and closed coupes and sedans offered cloth interiors, offering mohair upholstery. Buick offered a new approach to allow the transmission to "free-wheel" and no clutch shifting between second and third gear called "Wizard Control". In 1933, the aesthetics of all Buicks were updated with a new, corporate "streamlined" appearance shared with all GM cars for that year due to GM's Art and Color Studio headed by Harley Earl, and additional manufacturing locations opened across the country under the Buick-Oldsmobile-Pontiac Assembly Division. 1933 was the first year all GM vehicles were installed with optional vent windows which were initially called “No Draft Individually Controlled Ventilation” later renamed "Ventiplanes" which the patent application was filed on Nov. 28, 1932. It was assigned to the Ternstedt Manufacturing Company, a GM subsidiary that manufactured components for Fisher Body The power delivered by the engine was increased again and now it was up to 86 bhp, and in 1934, the model power increased to 88 hp. Buick re-introduced the Series 40, which once again became the entry-level model. In 1935 the Series 50 remained unchanged and the following year went out of production, having produced 127,416 examples.

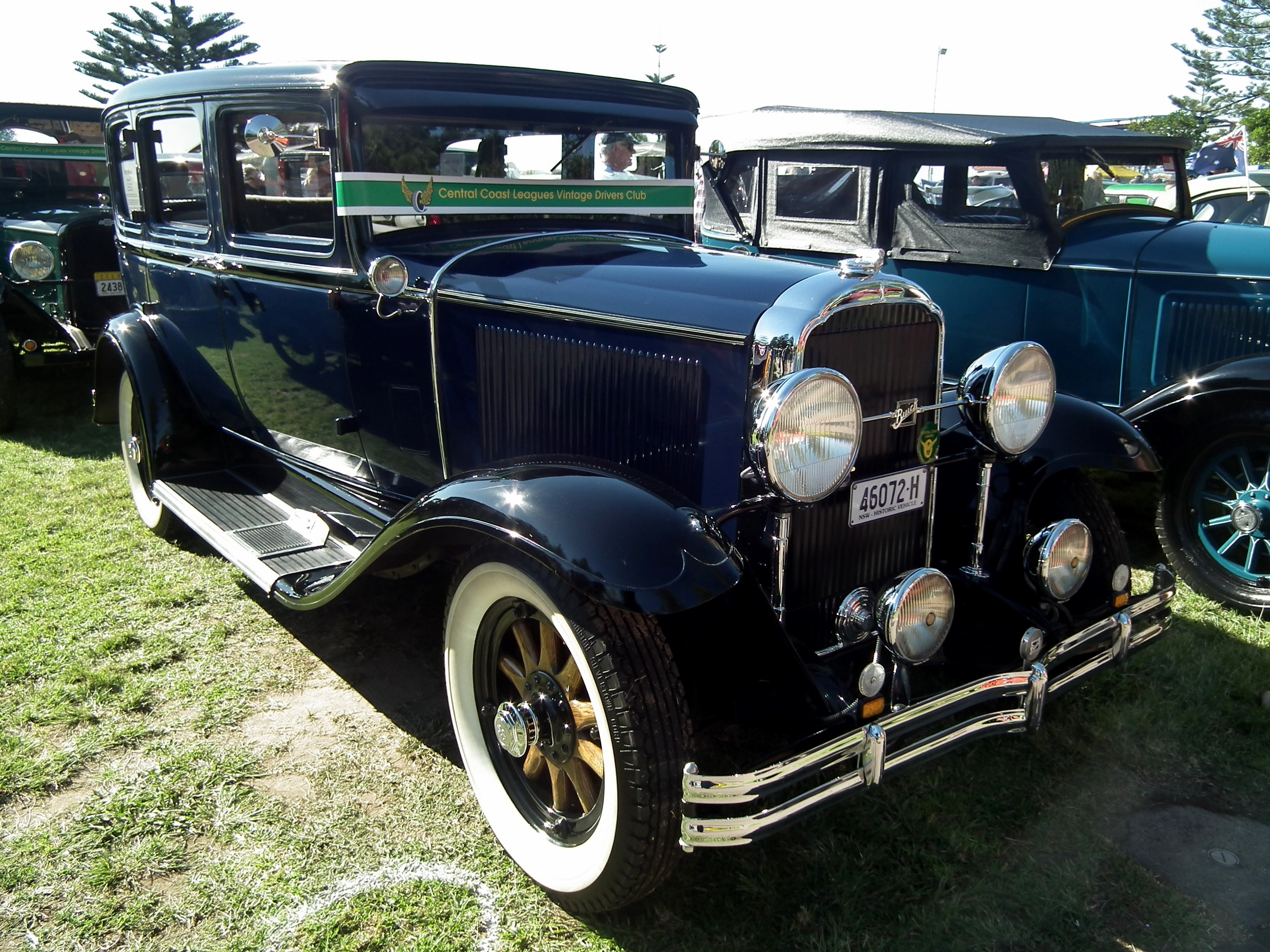
1931 Buick Series 50 sedan

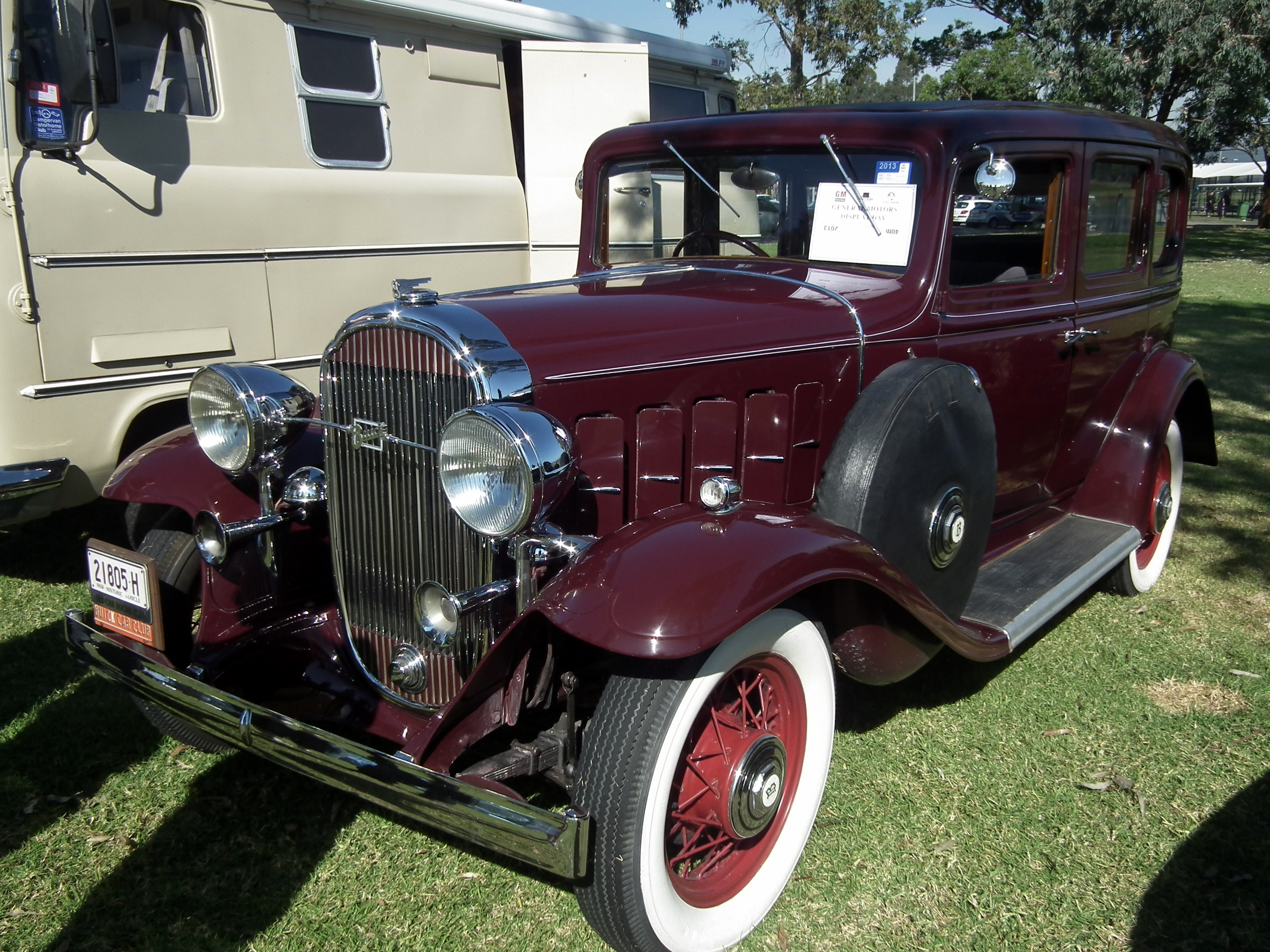
1932 Buick Series 50 sedan

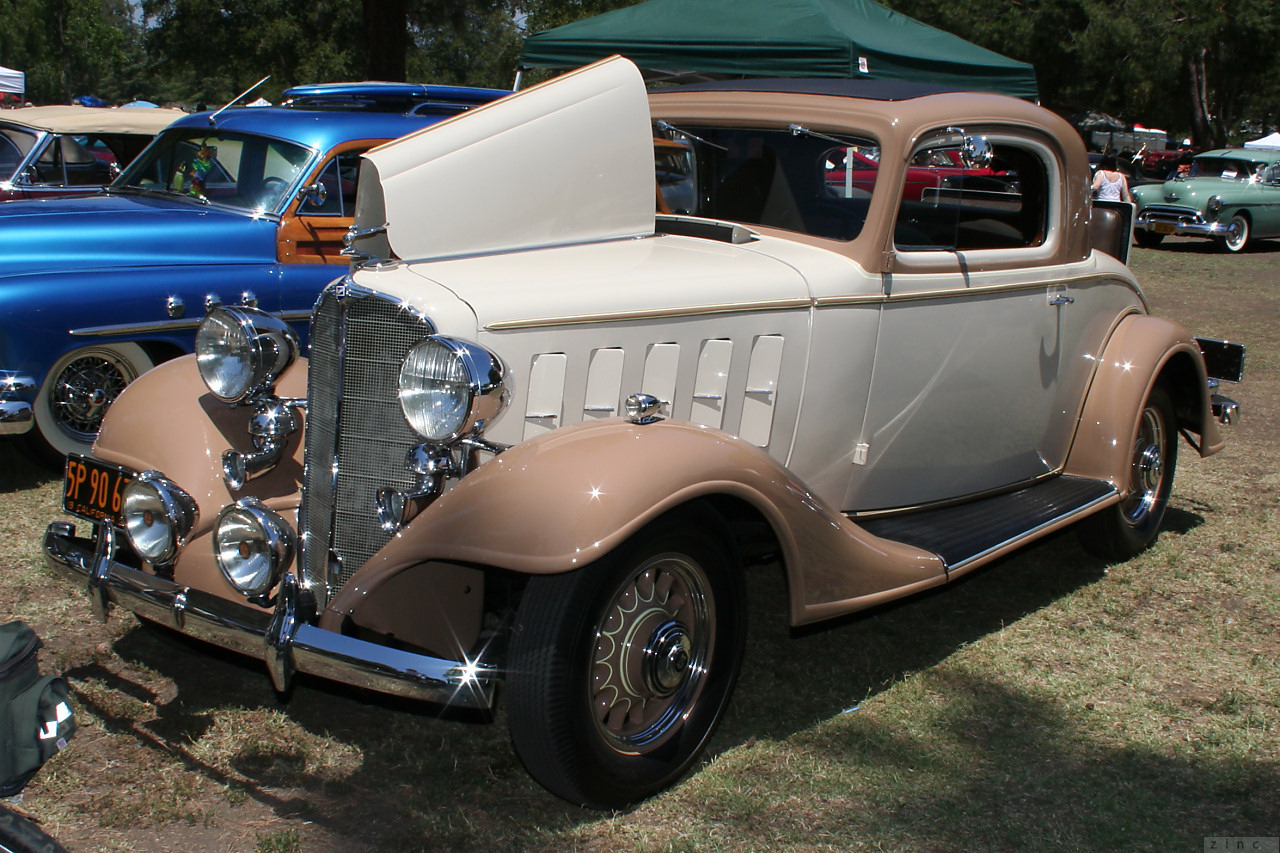
1933 Buick Series 50 coupe

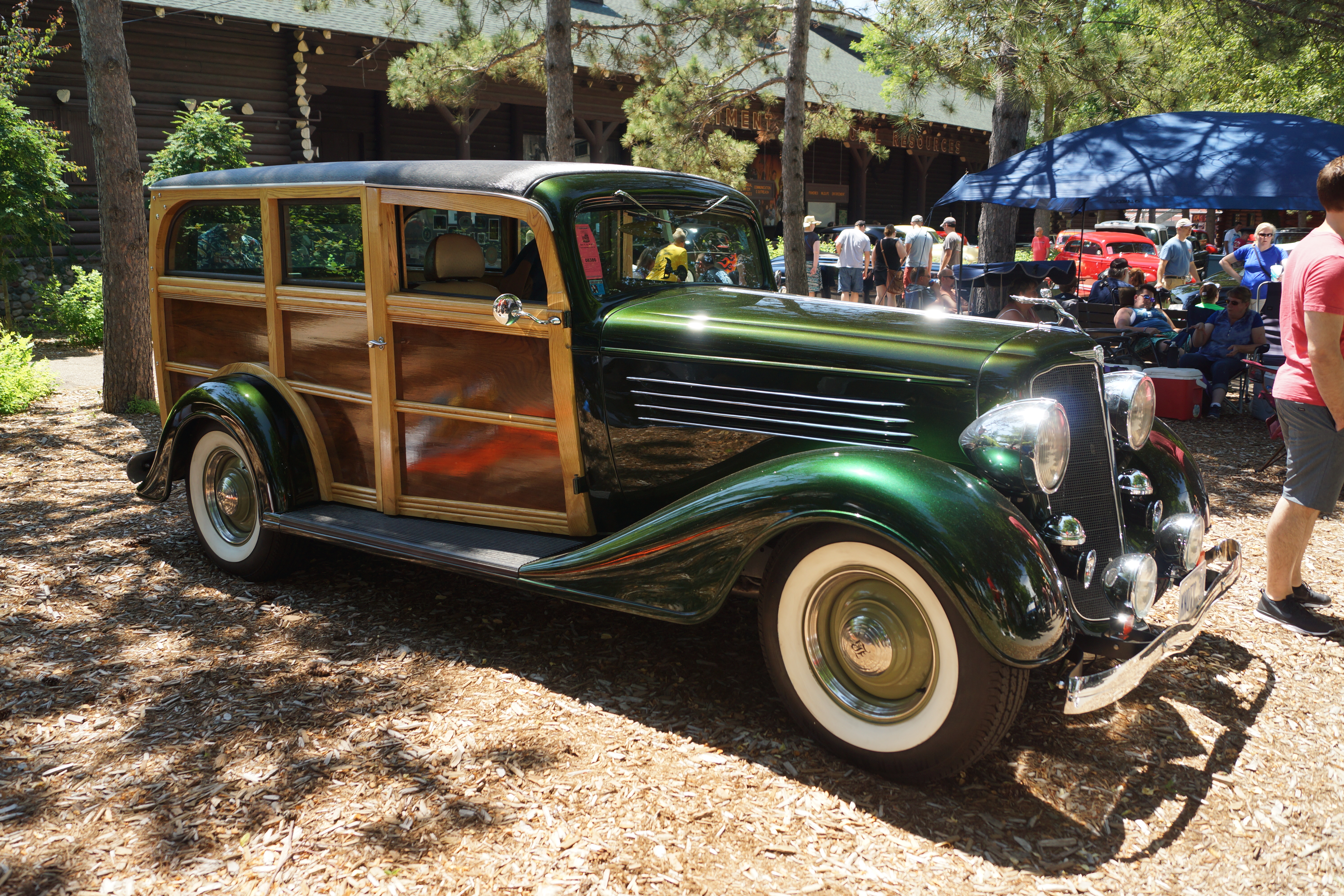
1934 Buick Series 50 Station Wagon

== 1940–1941 ==
First generation
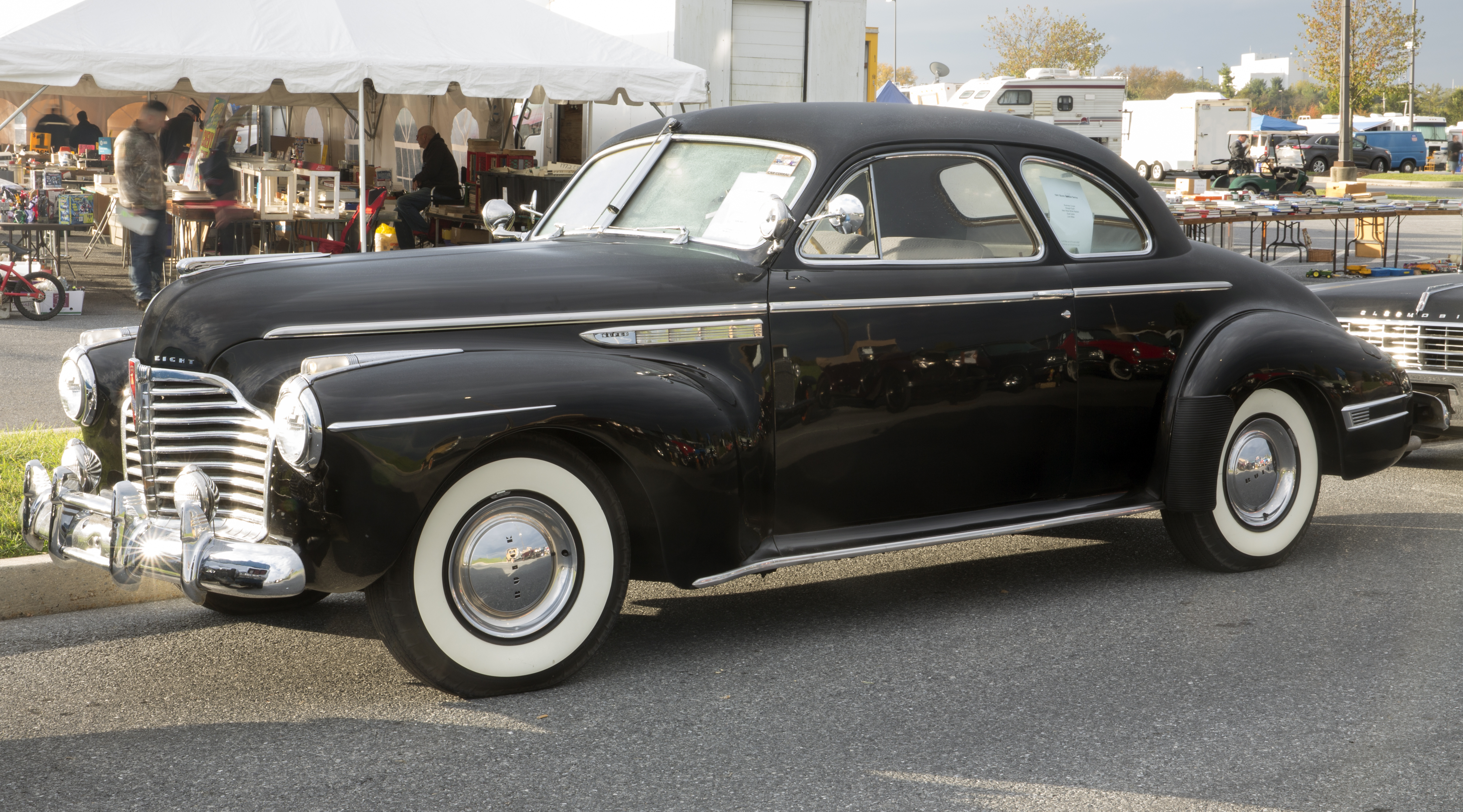
- 1941 Buick Super Series 50 Business Coupe Model 56

Overview
- Model years: 1940–1941
- Assembly: (main plant); Flint, Michigan, USA (Buick City) (branch assembly); Linden, New Jersey, USA (Linden Assembly); South Gate, California, USA (South Gate Assembly)

Body and chassis
- Body style: 4-door sedan 4-door convertible 2-door coupe 2-door convertible 2-door Business coupe 4-door Estate wagon (1940 only)
- Platform: C-body
- Related: Cadillac Series 62; LaSalle Series 52; Buick Roadmaster; Buick Y-Job; Oldsmobile 96/98; Pontiac Custom Torpedo

Powertrain
- Engine: 248 cu in (4.1 L) Fireball I8 OHV
- Transmission: 3-speed sliding shift manual

Dimensions
- Wheelbase: 121.0 in (3,073 mm)
- Length: 1940: 204.0 in (5,182 mm); 1941: 210.4 in (5,344 mm)
- Width: 1940: 75.8 in (1,925 mm); 1941: 76.5 in (1,943 mm)
- Height: 66.0 in (1,676 mm)
- Curb weight: 3,800–4,200 lb (1,700–1,900 kg)

When introduced in 1940 the new Series 50 Super shared the Art Deco "torpedo" C-body with the Series 70 Roadmaster, the Cadillac Series 62, the Oldsmobile Series 90, and the Pontiac Custom Torpedo, and offered shoulder and hip room that was over 5" wider over the previous year, eliminating the exterior running boards and styling that was streamlined and 2-3" lower. The Super offered approximately the same level of passenger accommodation, engine performance and luxury appearance as the discontinued LaSalle Series 50 when that product line was cancelled. When combined with a column mounted shift lever the cars offered true six passenger comfort. Five body styles, including an all-new Estate station wagon, were offered with standard Bedford cord in contrasting two-tone tan upholstery, with listed prices starting with US$1,058 ($24,314 in 2025 dollars) for the 2-door, 4-passenger Sport Coupe to US$1,549 ($35,598 in 2025 dollars) for the 4-door Convertible Phaeton.

The basic formula for the 1940 to 1952 Super was established by mating the Series 80 Roadmaster's longer wheelbase to the Series 40 Special's smaller displacement straight-eight engine. This led to an economical combination of voluminous passenger room and relatively good fuel economy. In contrast the Series 60 Century combined the shorter Special body with the larger displacement Roadmaster engine, while all Buicks used the same 3-speed manual transmission.

The new Super temporarily shared its 121.0 in (3,073 mm) wheelbase dimension with the 40 Special. Initially four body styles were offered: a 2-door coupe, a 2-door convertible, a 4-door sedan and a 4-door convertible. In the middle of the model year a 4-door Estate wagon was added which was exclusive to the Super. Interiors of Bedford cord (either tan or gray) were offered. The engine was the same 248 cu in (4.1 L) 107 hp Fireball I8 as used on the Special which was equipped with an oil filter. The Super was equipped with sealed beam headlights and with Fore-N-Aft Flash-Way directionals. 1940 was the only year the Super could be equipped with sidemount spare tires. A total of 128,736 units were sold in its first year.

The styling changes for 1941 were modest, but the changes under the hood were major. The compression ratio was raised from 6.15:1 to 7.0:1, the "turbulator" pistons were redesigned, smaller spark plugs were substituted for the previous type and “Compound Carburetion” was introduced, as it was on all Buicks except for the Special. Compound Carburetion was the forerunner of the modern four-barrel carburetor, and consisted of twin two-barrel carburetors. One unit operated all of the time, while the other operated only under hard acceleration. The new engine delivered 125 horsepower. All cars available with a choice of axle ratios and with two-tone color combinations with 19 selections at no extra charge. A new feature was a two-way hood that could be opened from either side. The 4-door convertible and the Estate wagon were gone but a new one year only body style was a 3-passenger 2-door Business Coupe which sold 2449 units. Overall sales fell to 92,067.

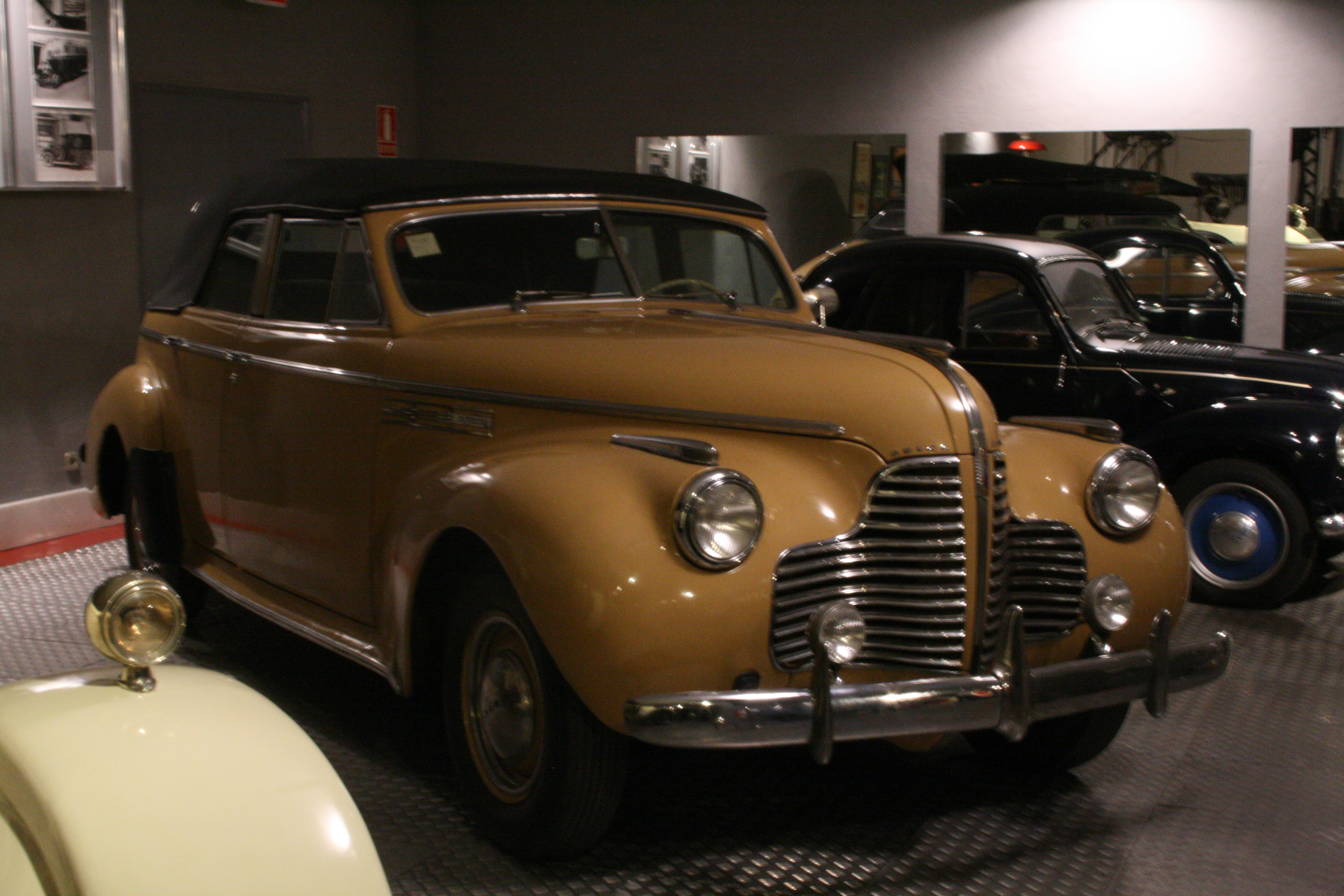
1940 Buick Super Series 50 Convertible Phaeton Model 51C

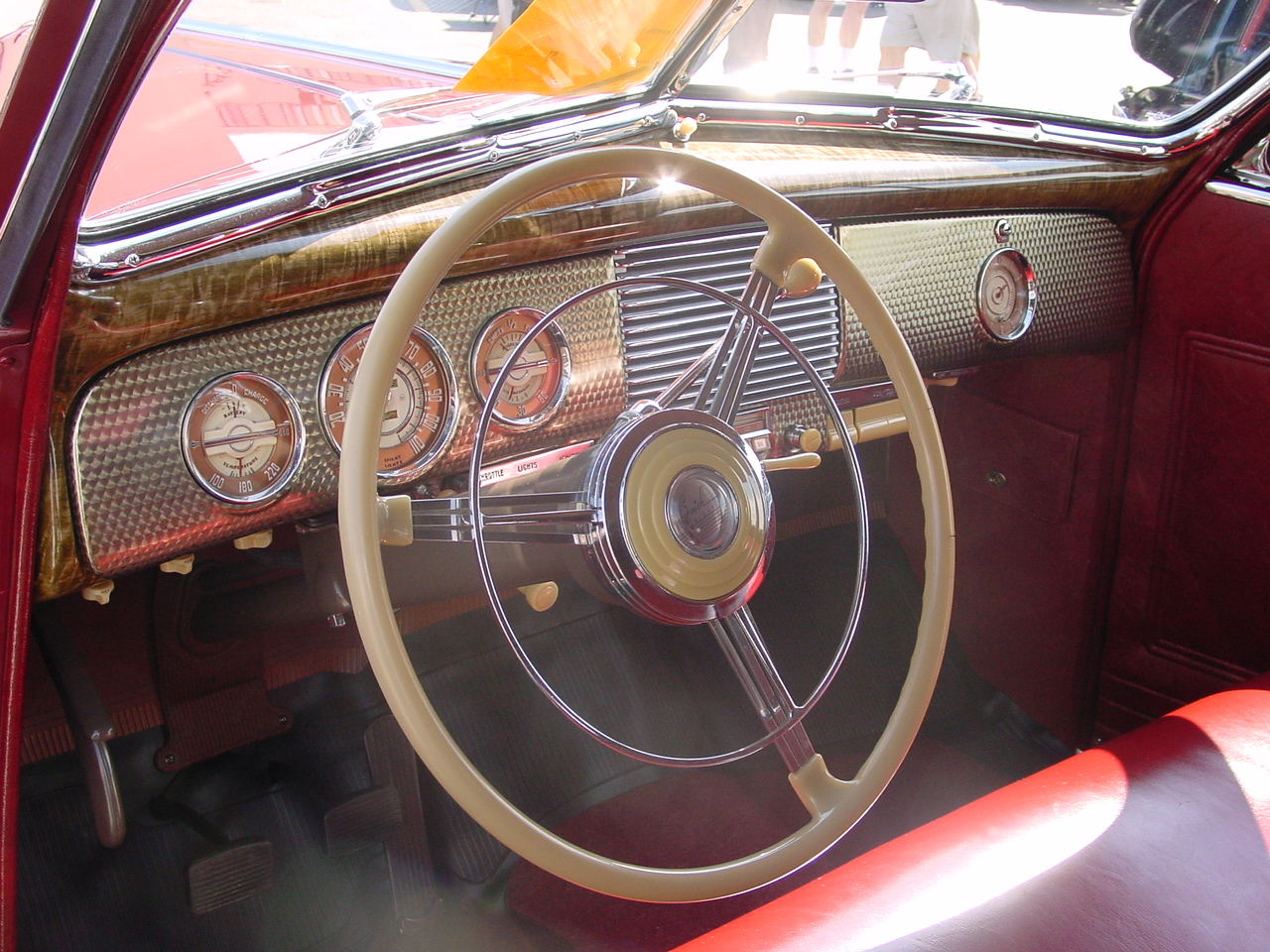
1940 Buick Super Series 50 convertible interior

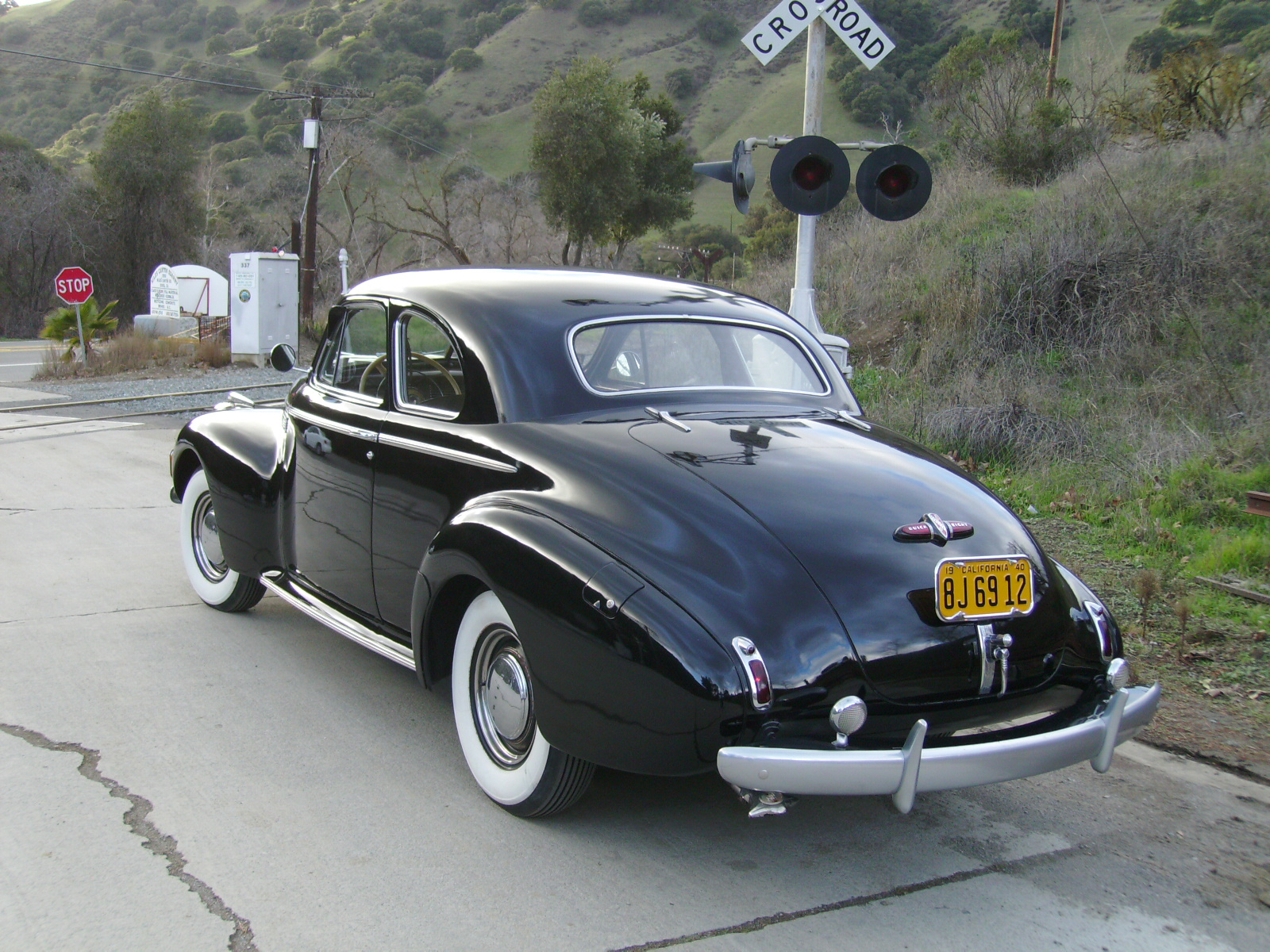
1940 Buick Super Series 50 Sport Coupe Model 56S rear

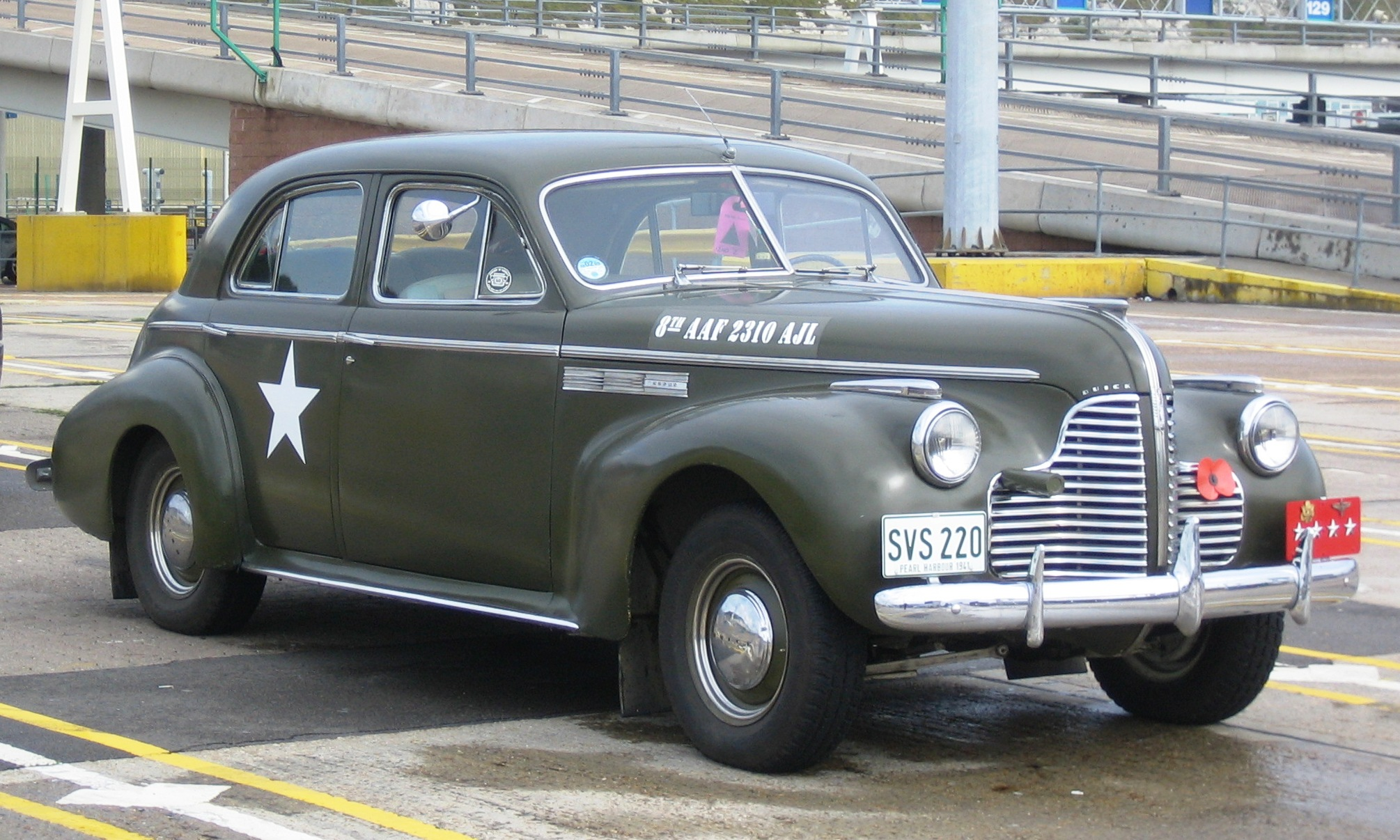
1940 Buick Super Series 50 Touring Sedan Model 51 US Army Air Force Staff Car

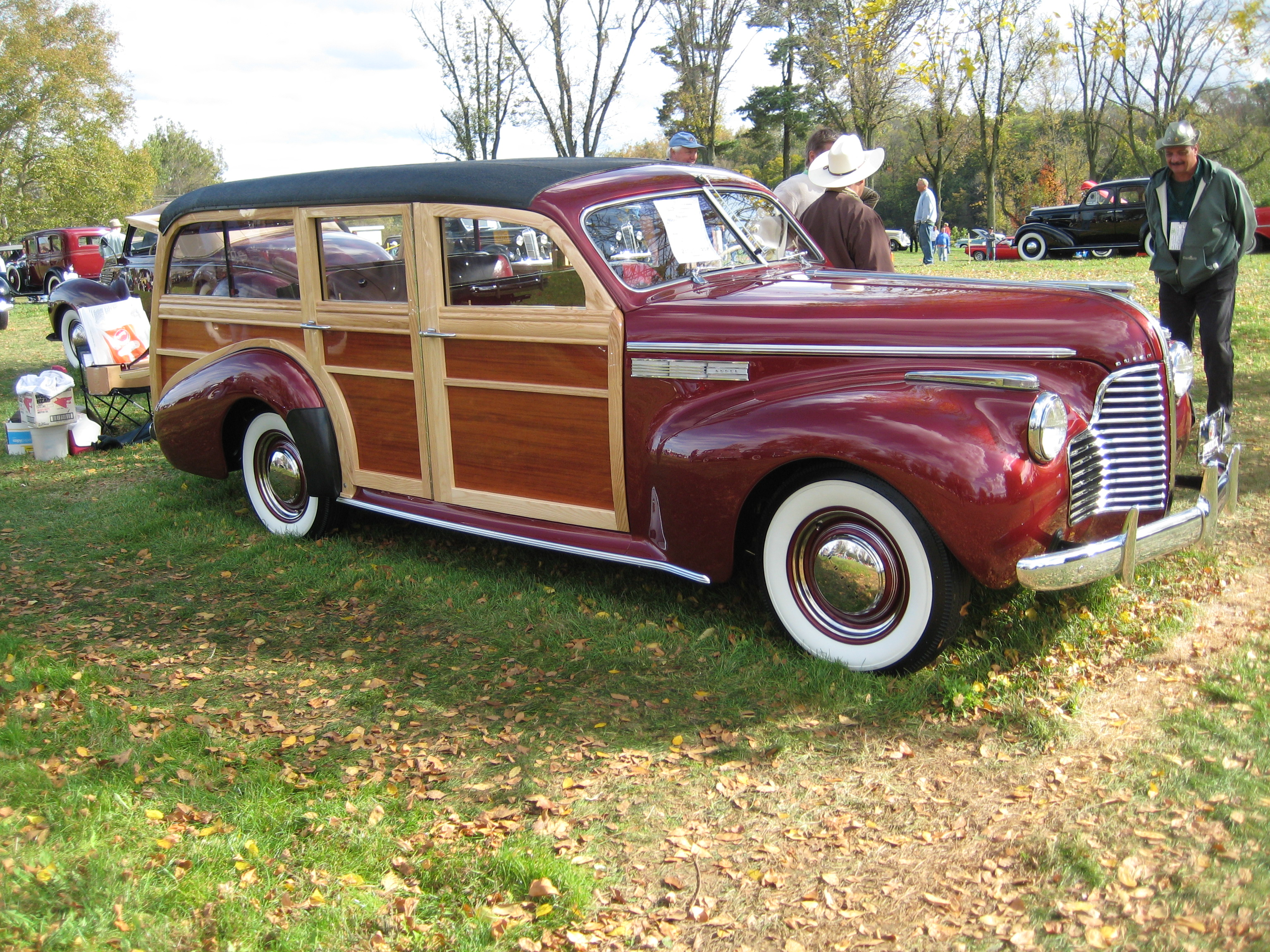
1940 Buick Super Estate Model 59

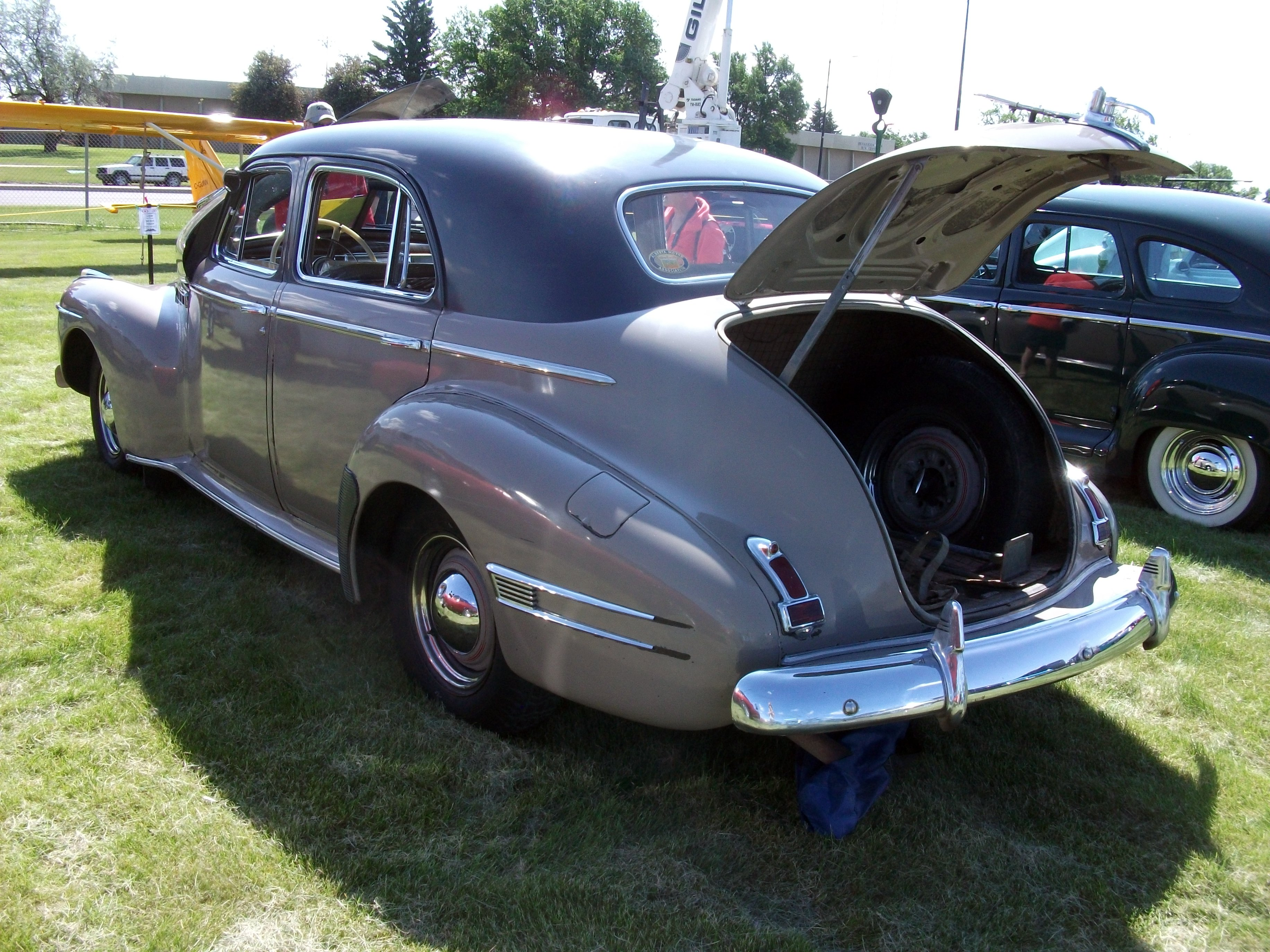
1941 Touring sedan Model 53 showing the new C-body trunk

== 1942, 1946–1948 ==
Second generation
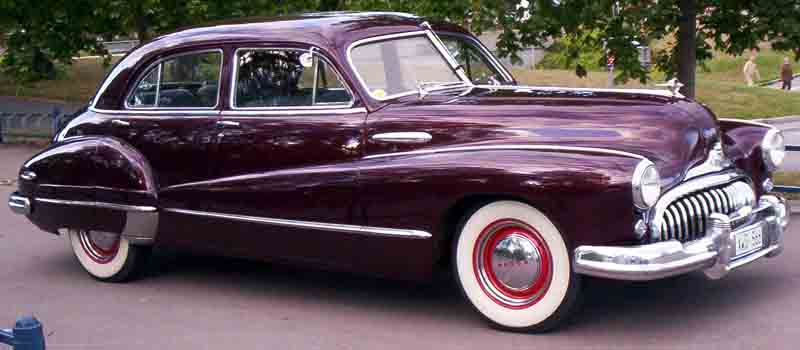

Overview
- Model years: 1942, 1946–1948
- Assembly: (main plant); Flint, Michigan, USA (Buick City) (branch assembly); Doraville, Georgia, USA (Doraville Assembly) "Atlanta"; Kansas City, Kansas, USA (Fairfax Assembly); Linden, New Jersey, USA (Linden Assembly); South Gate, California, USA (South Gate Assembly); Wilmington, Delaware, USA (Wilmington Assembly)

Body and chassis
- Body style: 4-door sedan 2-door Sedanet coupe 2-door convertible 4-door Estate wagon (1946-1948)
- Platform: C-body
- Related: Cadillac Series 62; Buick Roadmaster; Oldsmobile 98

Powertrain
- Engine: 248 cu in (4.1 L) Fireball OHV I8
- Transmission: 3-speed sliding shift manual

Dimensions
- Wheelbase: 124.0 in (3,150 mm)
- Length: 1942: 210.0 in (5,334 mm); 1946–47: 212.4 in (5,395 mm); 1948: 212.5 in (5,398 mm)
- Width: 78.6 in (1,996 mm)
- Height: 66.7 in (1,694 mm)
- Curb weight: 4,000–4,400 lb (1,800–2,000 kg)

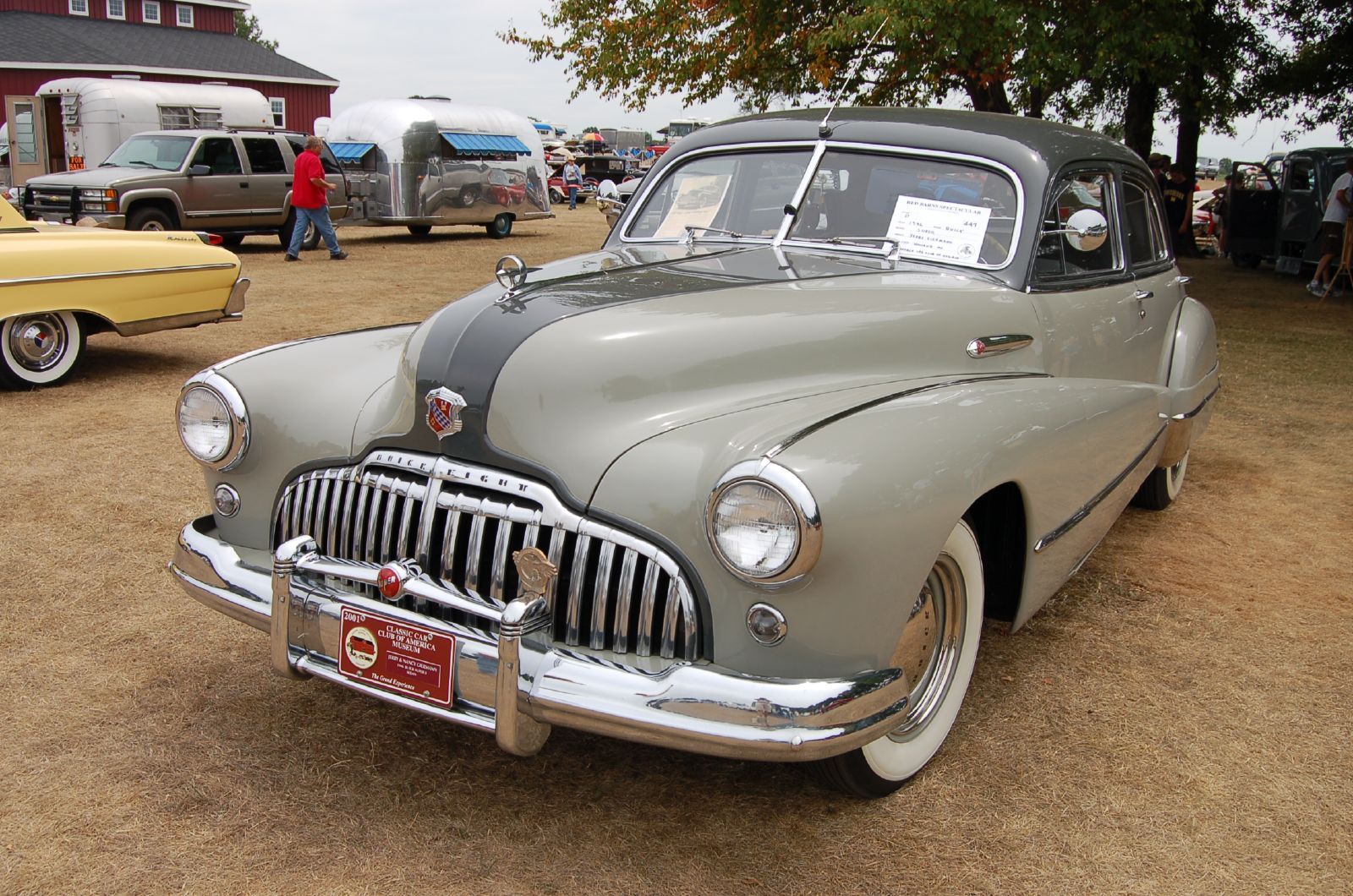
1946 Buick Super Four-Door Sedan

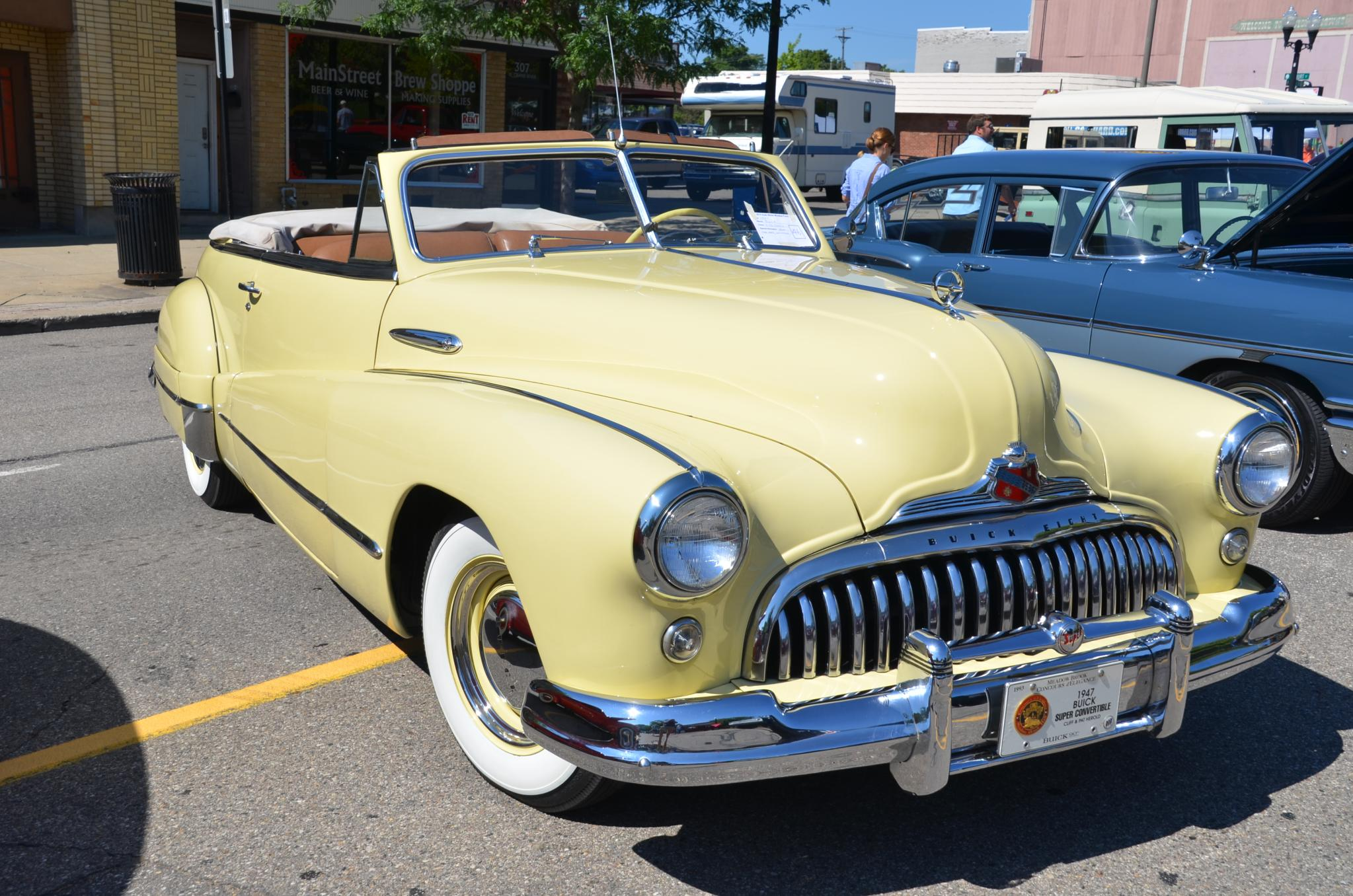
1947 Buick Super Convertible Sedan

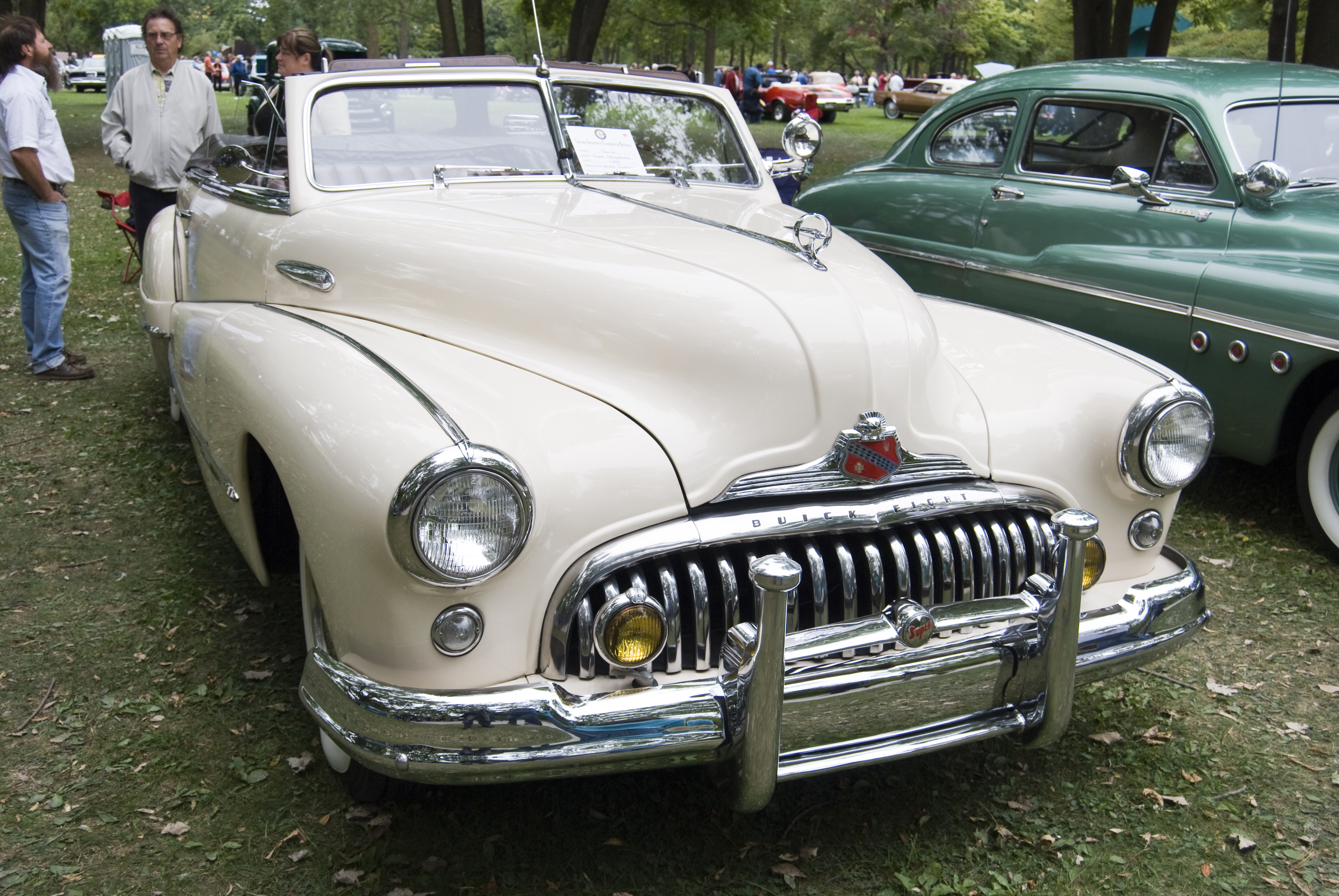
1948 Buick Super convertible

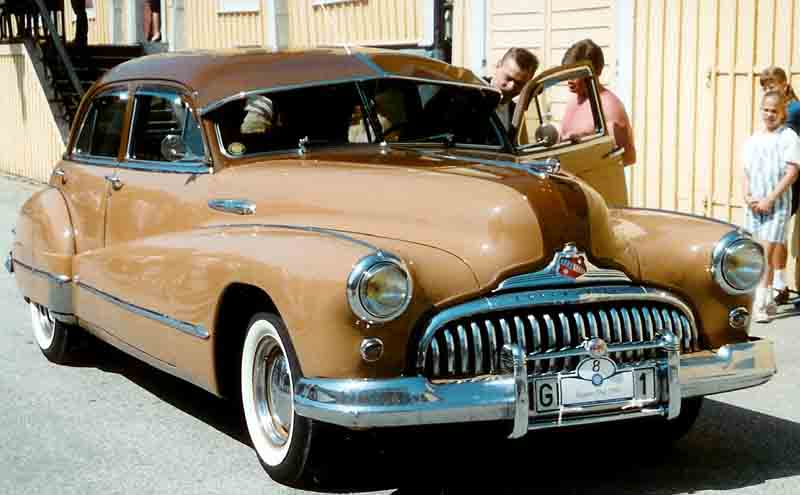
1948 Buick Super 4-door sedan

The 1942 Super coupes adopted the appealing Sedanet fastback style that had been the sensation of 1941 on Century and Special. New wider and lower bodies were offered and "Airfoil" front fenders that flowed into the lines of the rear fenders were introduced on convertibles and sedanet models. The Super had new front fender trim featuring parallel chrome strips. Also featured for 1942 was a handsome new grille with a lower outline and thin vertical strips. A feature shared with other Buicks was a new interior air intake positioned near the front center grille that eliminated the old cowl-level ventilator. The number of body styles was reduced to three with the elimination of the one year only Business coupe.

After the government prohibited the use of chrome on January 1, 1942 a number of body styles were dropped and most trim was now painted. Cast iron pistons were used in the 248 cu in (4.1 L) Fireball straight-eight engine. The last of the 1942 Buicks were completed on February 4, 1942. Only 33,034 Supers were built in the abbreviated model year.

In 1946 Buick once again combined the large Series 70 Roadmaster body with the economical Series 40 Special powerplant to create the Series 50 Super line. Basic styling was continued from 1942 now sedans had the front fender sweep across the doors to the rear fenders as did the Sedanet and convertible styles. A stamped grille with vertical bars dominated the frontal ensemble. Single stainless body trim lines began on the front fenders and ended at the rear edge of the standard rear wheelhouse shields. Standard equipment included an automatic choke, clock, ash receiver, turn signals and a painted woodgrain instrument panels. Exterior series identification was found on the crossbar between the bumper guards front and rear. Cloisonne emblems carried the Super emblem. Compound Carburetion was eliminated and the compression ratio was reduced to 6.30:1. As a consequence the 1946 Super's horsepower fell from 125 to 110. Torque on the other hand was hardly affected. The number of body styles increased to four with the return of the Estate wagon after a six year absence. A total of 119,334 units were sold. The front suspension was independent with coil springs. 76.98% of Buick sales this year were Supers.

Combining big Roadmaster room with an economical Special engine continued to make the Super an American favorite in 1947. The Super was little changed from its 1946 counterpart, except for new stamped grille that had separate upper bar and new emblem. Stainless lower body moldings made a single line along the body and continued onto the standard wheelhouse shields. A white Tenite steering wheel was standard while the instruments were round and set into a two-toned dash panel. Exterior series identification was found on the crossbars between the standard bumper guards. A chrome emblem was used with the series script embossed and filled with red. Sales reached a record 159,588. The height was 64.9 inches. Brakes were 12 inch drums.

The main external change to the 1948 Super from its 1947 counterpart was the "Super" script on each front fender. Other series identification continued to be earned on the bumper guard crossbar. The car was a bit lower than in 1947 rolling on new 7.60 x 15 tires mounted on wheels with trim rings and small hubcaps. Super script was also found on the center crest of a new black Tenite steering wheel. New cloth interiors featured leatherette scuff pads and trim risers. The instrument panel was redone, using silver-tone instruments on a two-tone gray panel. The sedan was carpeted in the rear with a carpet insert also found in the front rubber mat. The convertible also featured cloth and leather interior trim with power top, seat and windows standard. Total sales were 108,521.

== 1949–1953 ==
Third generation
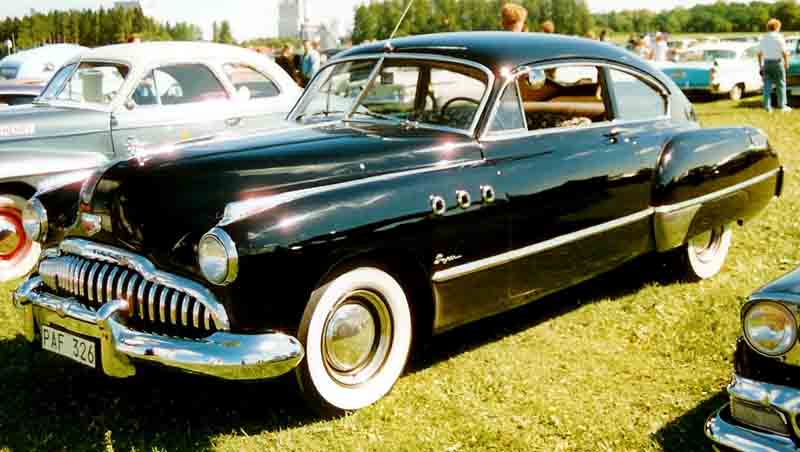
- 1949 Buick Super Sedanet, Model 56-S

Overview
- Model years: 1949–1953
- Assembly: (main plant); Flint, Michigan, USA (Buick City) (branch assembly); Doraville, Georgia, USA (Doraville Assembly) "Atlanta"; Framingham, Massachusetts, USA (Framingham Assembly); Kansas City, Kansas, USA (Fairfax Assembly); Linden, New Jersey, USA (Linden Assembly); South Gate, California, USA (South Gate Assembly); Wilmington, Delaware, USA (Wilmington Assembly)

Body and chassis
- Body style: 4-door sedan 4-door Riviera sedan 2-door Sedanet coupe 2-door Riviera hardtop 2-door convertible 4-door Estate wagon
- Platform: C-body
- Related: Cadillac Series 62; Cadillac Series 61; Buick Roadmaster; Oldsmobile 98

Powertrain
- Engine: 248 cu in (4.1 L) Fireball I8 OHV; 263 cu in (4.3 L) Fireball I8 OHV; 322 cu in (5.3 L) Nailhead V8 OHV
- Transmission: 3-speed sliding shift manual Twin turbine Dynaflow automatic

Dimensions
- Wheelbase: 1949: 121.0 in (3,073 mm); 1950–53 Riviera sedans: 125.5 in (3,188 mm); 1950–53 others: 121.5 in (3,086 mm)
- Length: 1949: 209.5 in (5,321 mm); 1950 Riviera sedans: 213.5 in (5,423 mm); 1950 others: 209.5 in (5,321 mm); 1951–52 Riviera sedans: 210.2 in (5,339 mm); 1951–52 others: 206.2 in (5,237 mm); 1953 Riviera sedans: 211.6 in (5,375 mm); 1953 others: 207.6 in (5,273 mm)
- Width: 79.9 in (2,029 mm)
- Height: 63.0 in (1,600 mm)
- Curb weight: 3,800–4,300 lb (1,700–2,000 kg)

Chronology
- Successor: Buick Skylark (convertible only)

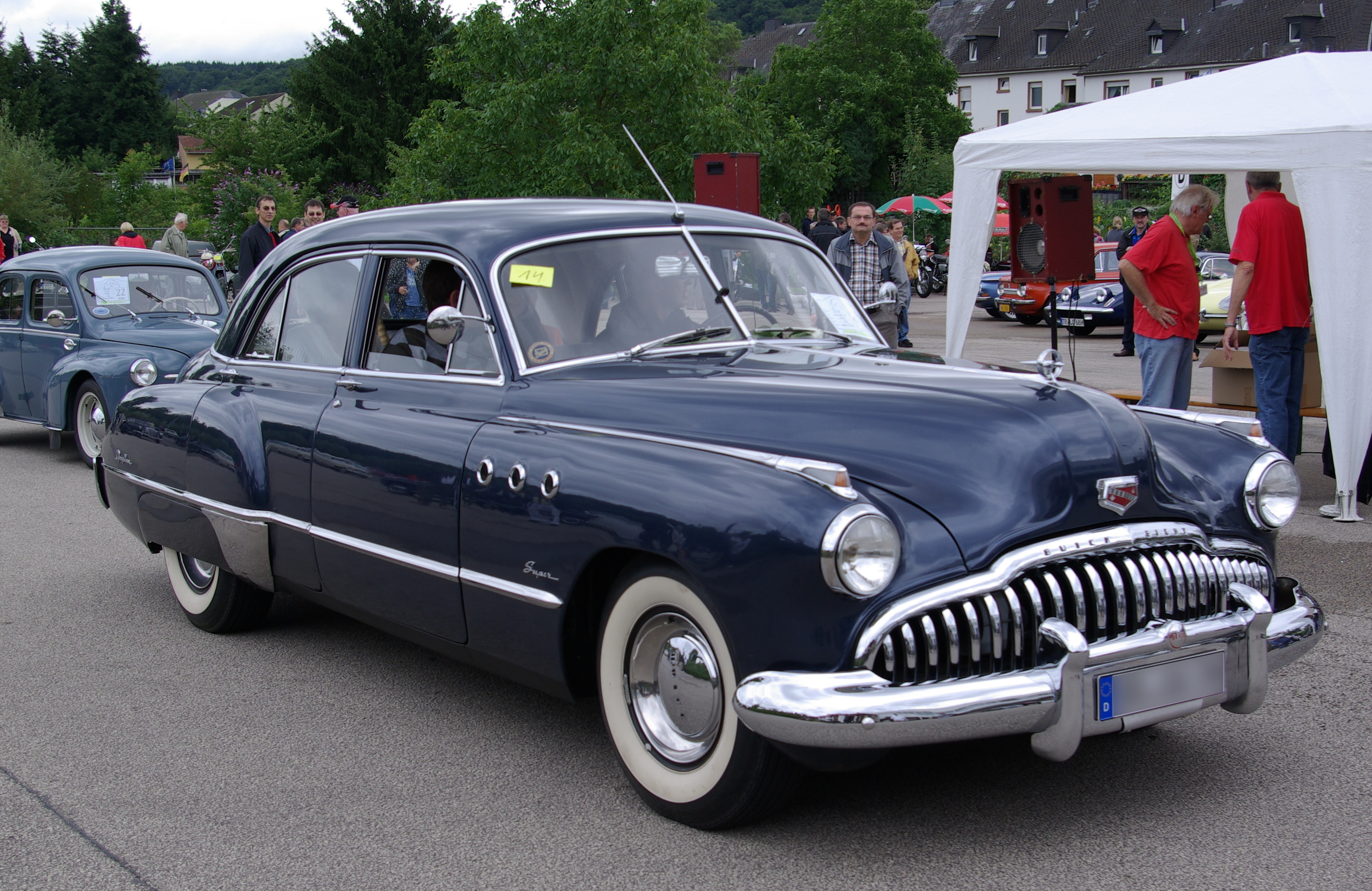
1949 Buick Super 4-Door Sedan

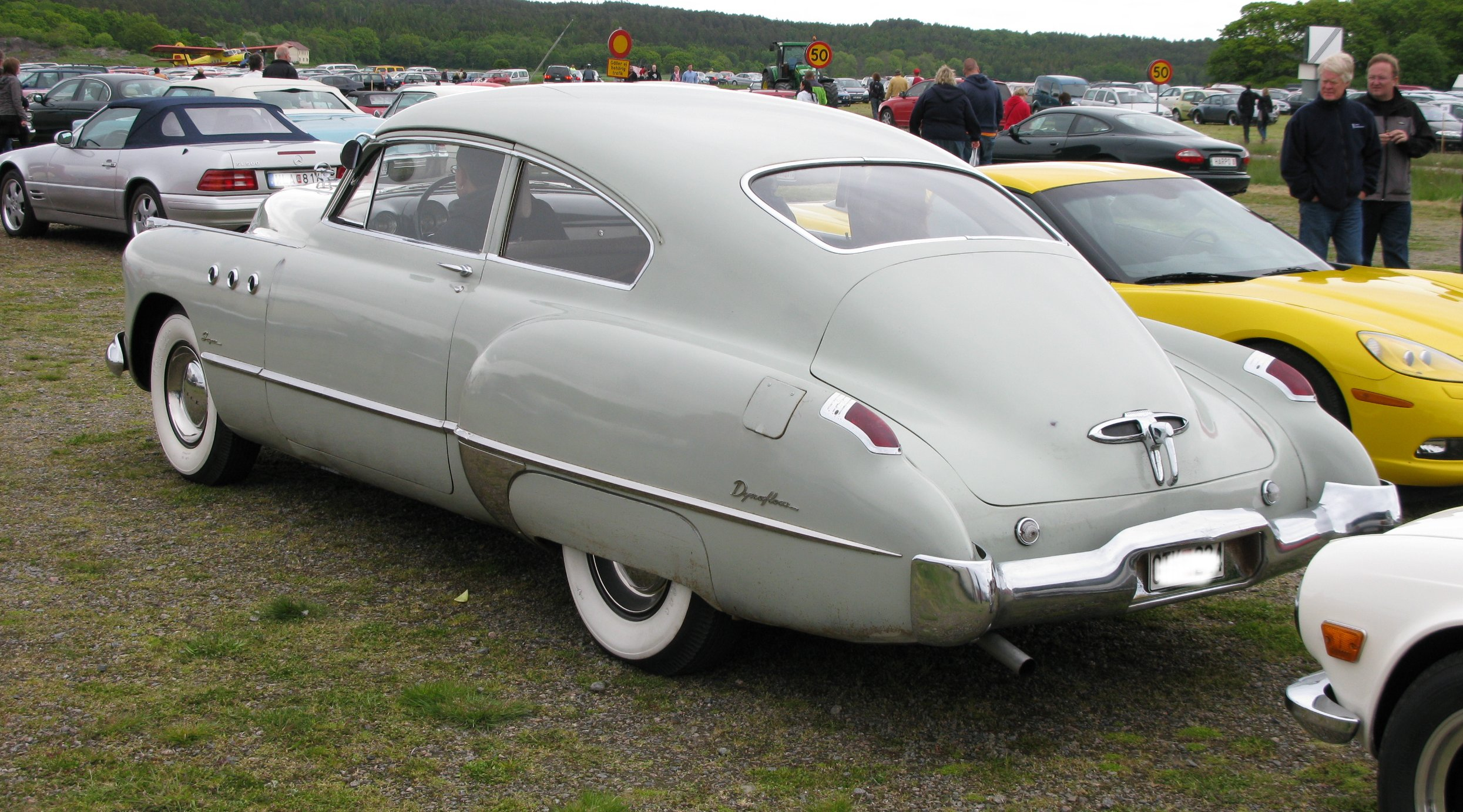
1949 Buick Super Sedanet Model 56S rear

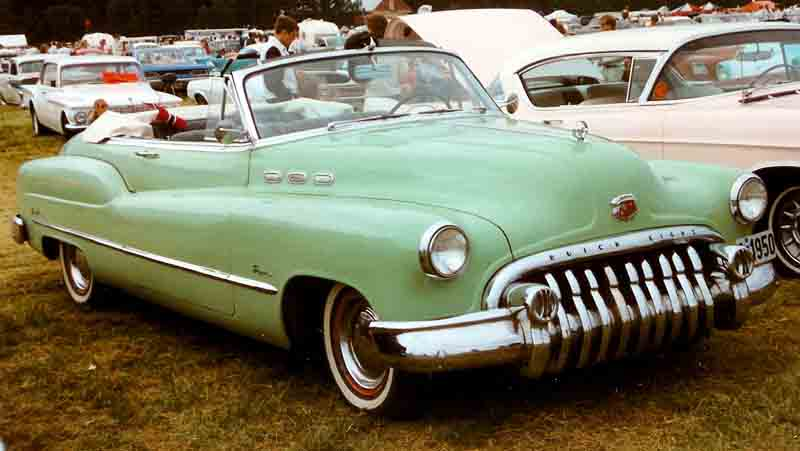
1950 Buick Super convertible

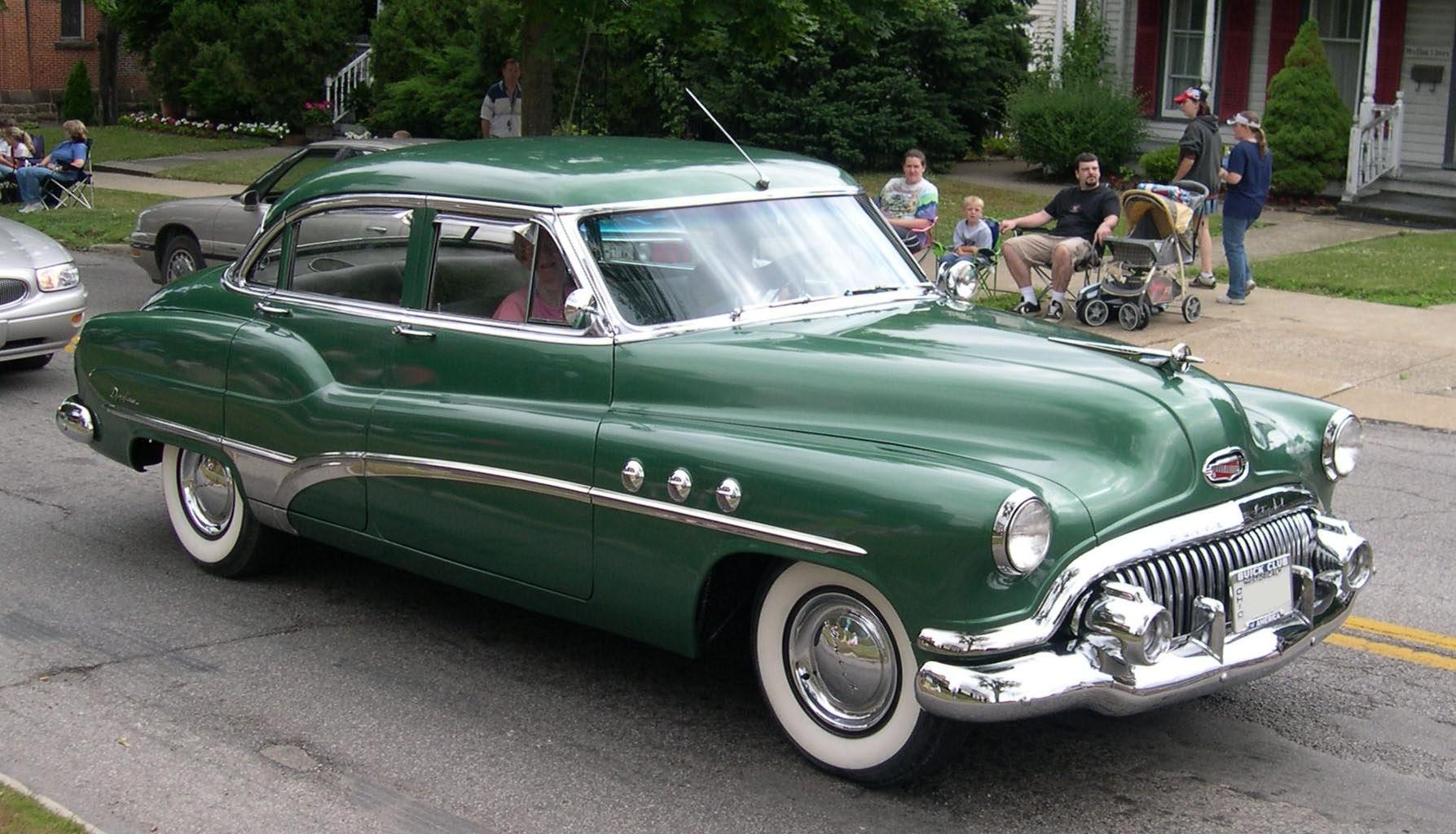
1951 Buick Super Riviera sedan

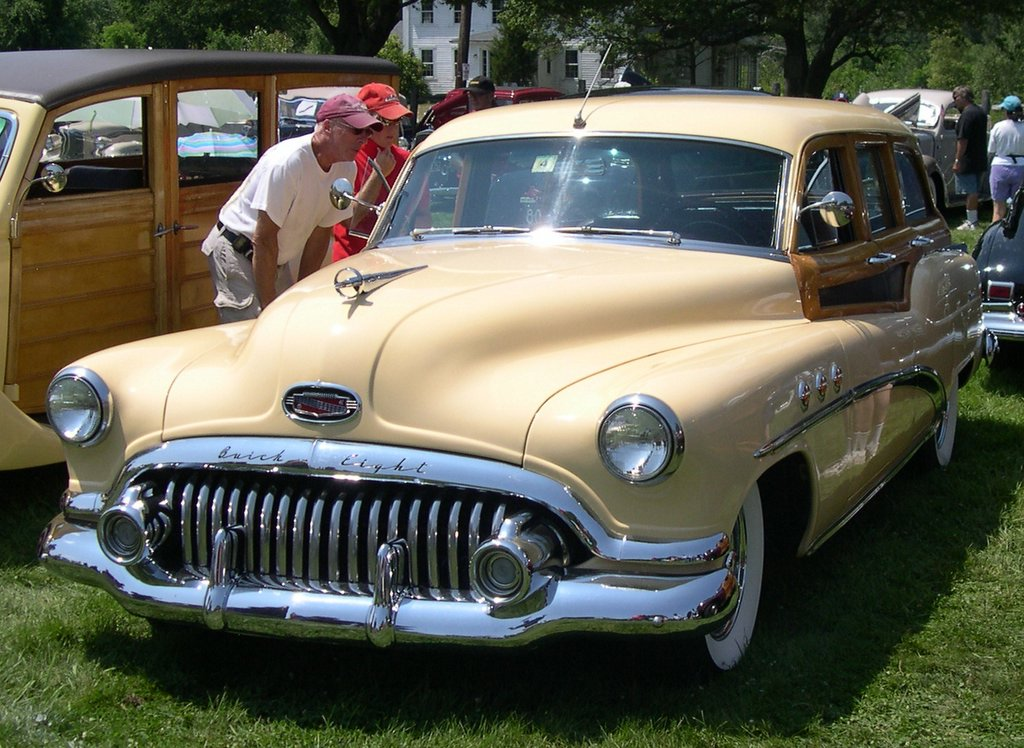
1952 Buick Super Estate

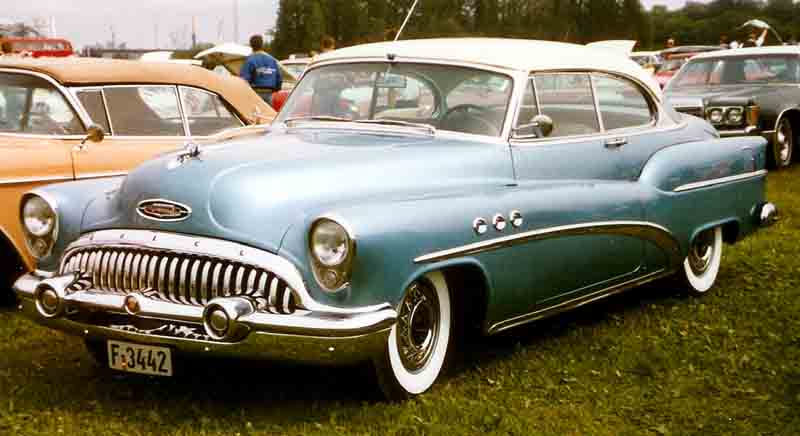
1953 Buick Super Riviera coupe

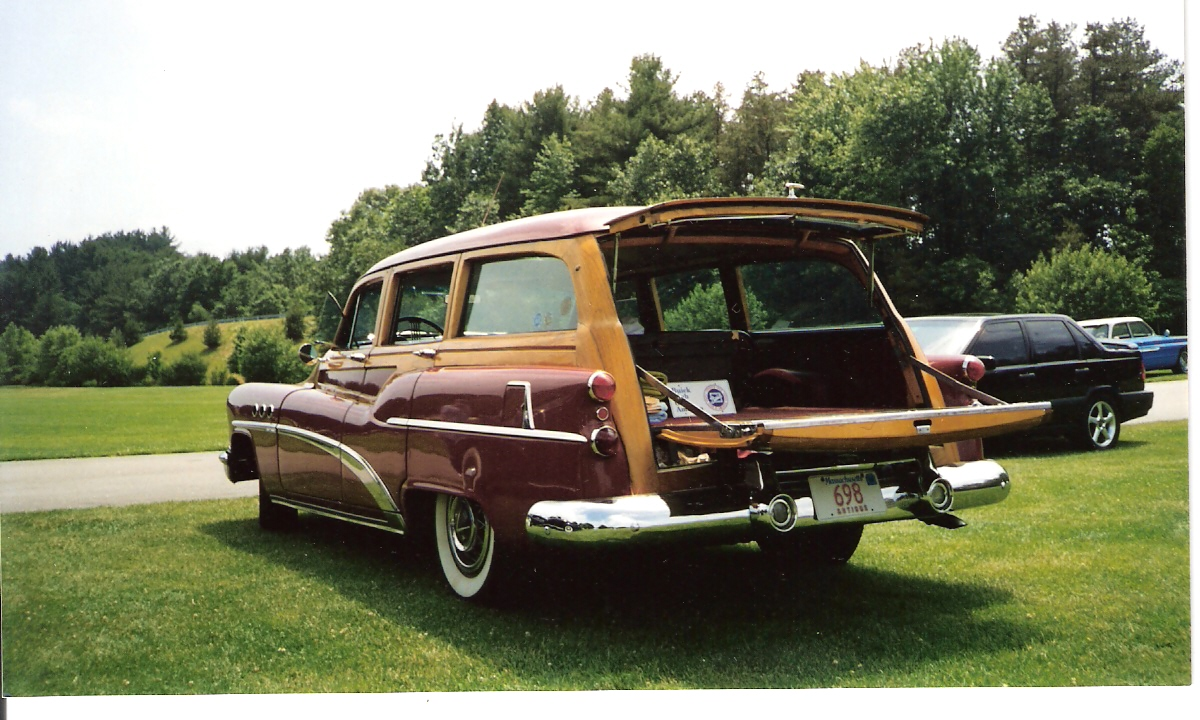
1953 Buick Super Estate rear

The Super shared a new General Motors C-body with the Roadmaster but on a shorter wheelbase. It featured three chrome VentiPorts on each front fender to denote its smaller displacement straight-eight engine when compared with the Roadmaster. The sales brochure noted that VentiPorts helped ventilate the engine compartment, and possibly that was true in early 1949, but sometime during the model year they became plugged. The idea for VentiPorts grew out of a modification Buick styling chief Ned Nickles had added to his own 1948 Roadmaster. He had installed four amber lights on each side of his car’s hood wired to the distributor so as to flash on and off as each piston fired simulating the flames from the exhaust stack of a fighter airplane. Combined with the gunsight mascot hood ornament, VentiPorts put the driver at the controls of an imaginary fighter airplane. Upon seeing this, Buick chief Harlow Curtice was so delighted that he ordered that (non-lighting) VentiPorts be installed on all 1949 Buicks.

"Super" script was found just above the full length body fender molding on the front fenders. New fender edge taillamps were featured while rear fender skins remained a Buick standard. New fender top parking lamps, harkening back to 1941 styling appeared. Full wheel trim discs were standard along with such features as a cigar lighter, ashtray, and automatic choke. Cloth interiors were standard, except on the convertible which was trimmed in leather and leatherette and had a power top, seat and windows as standard equipment.

Dynaflow automatic transmission was now optional equipment on Supers in 1949. Cars so equipped had 6.9:1 compression ratio and 120 horsepower. Total sales set a record at 190,514 for the first time since the Super's introductory year. The instrument panel was new.

The Super was available in four body styles: 2-door Sedanet fastback, 4-door sedan, 2-door convertible and 4-door wagon.

The 1950 Supers shared with all the other series totally new all bumper guard grille and more rounded styling. Super script appeared on front fenders just above the full length lower bodyside moldings. A new body style was a 2-door Riviera hardtop. Another new bodystyle was a long wheelbase sedan which was stretched an extra four inches (102 mm) and featured plusher interior than most Supers, which normally had cloth interiors of finer material than the Special. Supers had three VentiPorts on each hoodside. The convertible had leather power seats plus power windows and top. The Sedanet was now called Jetback, whilst the notchback sedan was named Tourback.

The 1950 Super came with a single two-barrel carburetor on a new higher displacement 263 cu in (4.3 L) Fireball I8 which produced 112 hp (84 kW). It was able to achieve speeds over 90 miles per hour (140 km/h) with an optional Dynaflow automatic transmission which, rather than changing through gears, used the torque converter to couple the motor to a single gear ratio. The car had two splits in the back glass although the windshield was now curved one-piece glass. Models also could be equipped with an AM radio and an antenna that could be adjusted via a knob in the front center above the windshield. In the June 1953 Popular Mechanics, acceleration was rated at 0-60 mph in 14.5 seconds due to the languid nature of the Dynaflow transmission. The Super set an all time record of 251,883 sold.

In 1951 Supers had larger bodies than Specials but looked similar with three rounded VentiPorts per fender, broad bright fender shields and a full length "Sweepspear" chrome body side molding. This chrome-plated strip started above the front wheel, after which it gently curved down nearly to the rocker panel just before the rear wheel, and then curved around the rear wheel in a quarter of a circle to go straight back to the taillight. Series script was found on the deck lid and within the steering wheel center. The long wheelbase sedan was named the Riviera sedan although it was not a hardtop. Supers were trimmed with materials similar to Special Deluxes except for in the plush Super Riviera sedan. Front turn signals were within the bumper guard "bombs," while rear signals shared the stop lamps' housing on the rear fender edges. The convertibles and Estate wagon were trimmed in leather. 169,226 Supers were sold. The Jetback Sedanet was discontinued with only 1,500 produced, with the fastback design, dating back to the pre-war era, being regarded as dated by the turn of the decade.

In 1952 Buick's mid-priced line resembled the Series 40 with three VentiPorts per fender and Sweepspear rocker panel trim. Super script appeared on the rear fenders aided identification. The Super was built with the larger C-body, however. The full flowing fenderline dipped deeper on this body and rear fenders had a rear crest line absent on the B-body Specials. A new deck lid gave a more squared off appearance. Like other Buick series it was a near copy year for 1952. Chromed rear fender fins gave distinction to 1952 Supers. Interiors were cloth except on convertibles and Estate wagons which were trimmed with leather. The Super used a different instrument panel than the Special. It was distinguished by a large center speedometer housing flanked by smaller gauge housings. Series identification was found within the steering wheel center. The Sedanet and the regular wheelbase sedan were cancelled. Sales fell to 135,332.

In 1953 Buick's middle priced line shared the Roadmaster's new V8 and, for this year the Roadmaster Riviera sedan shared the Super Riviera sedan's 125.5 in (3188 mm) wheelbase. The Special shared the Super Tourback sedan's 121.5 in (3,086 mm) wheelbase. The Super earned a horizontal trim bar on its rear fenders which distinguished it from the Series 70 Roadmasters. Otherwise its side trim bar on its rear fenders was identical although the Super had only three VentiPorts on each front fender. Series identification was found on the deck emblem. Full wheelcovers were now standard. The vee in the bombsight ornament signified the V8 power under the hood. Interiors in most models were nylon and silky broadcloth. The convertible had power windows, seat and top as standard equipment. Dynaflow was now standard equipment. Air conditioning was a new option. A total of 190,514 Supers were sold.

== 1954–1956 ==
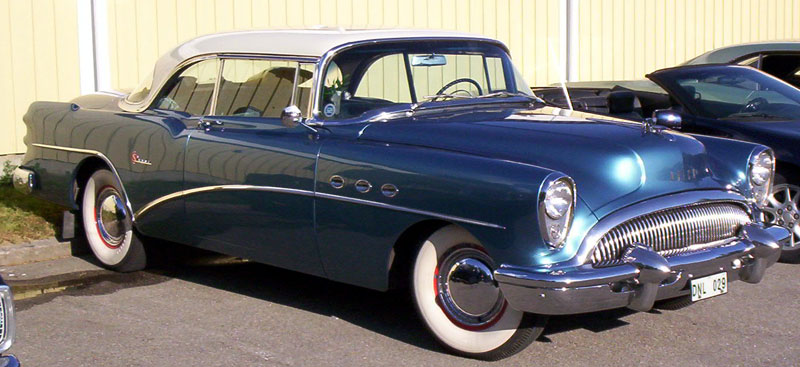
1954 Buick Super Riviera coupe

Fourth generation
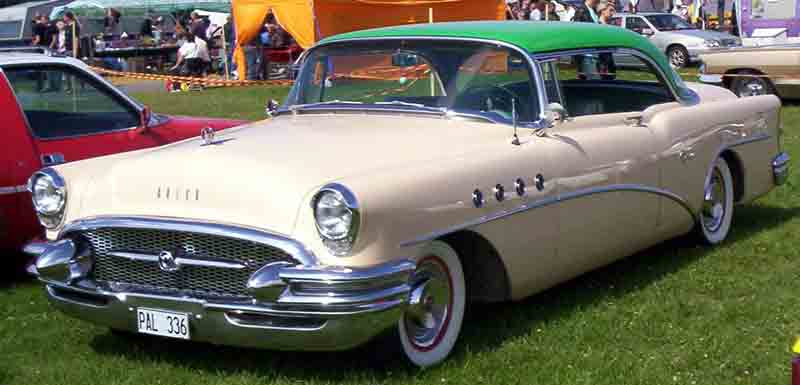
- 1955 Buick Super 2-Door Riviera

Overview
- Model years: 1954–1956
- Assembly: (main plant); Flint, Michigan, USA (Buick City) (branch assembly); Arlington, Texas, USA (Arlington Assembly); Doraville, Georgia, USA (Doraville Assembly) "Atlanta"; Framingham, Massachusetts, USA (Framingham Assembly); Kansas City, Kansas, USA (Fairfax Assembly); Linden, New Jersey, USA (Linden Assembly); South Gate, California, USA (South Gate Assembly); Wilmington, Delaware, USA (Wilmington Assembly)
- Designer: Harley Earl

Body and chassis
- Body style: 4-door sedan 4-door Riviera hardtop 2-door Riviera hardtop 2-door convertible
- Platform: C-body
- Related: Cadillac Series 62; Buick Roadmaster; Oldsmobile 98

Powertrain
- Engine: 322 cu in (5.3 L) Nailhead V8 OHV
- Transmission: 3-speed sliding shift manual Twin turbine Dynaflow automatic

Dimensions
- Wheelbase: 127.0 in (3,226 mm)
- Length: 1954: 216.8 in (5,507 mm); 1955: 216.0 in (5,486 mm); 1956: 213.8 in (5,431 mm)
- Width: 79.8 in (2,027 mm)
- Height: 62.6 in (1,590 mm)
- Curb weight: 4,200–4,500 lb (1,900–2,000 kg)

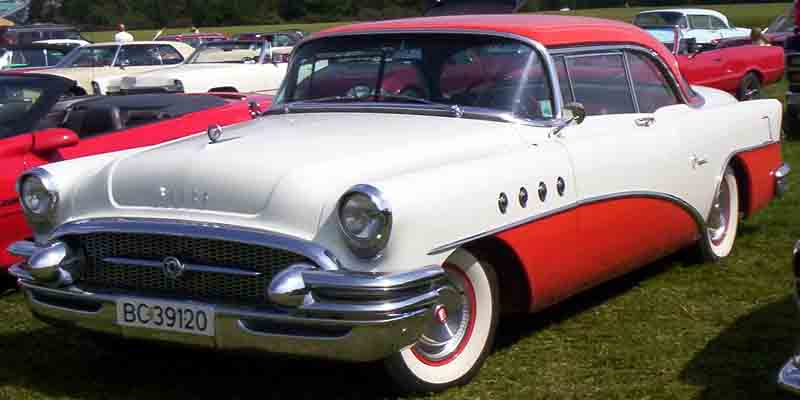
1955 Buick Super 2-Door Riviera

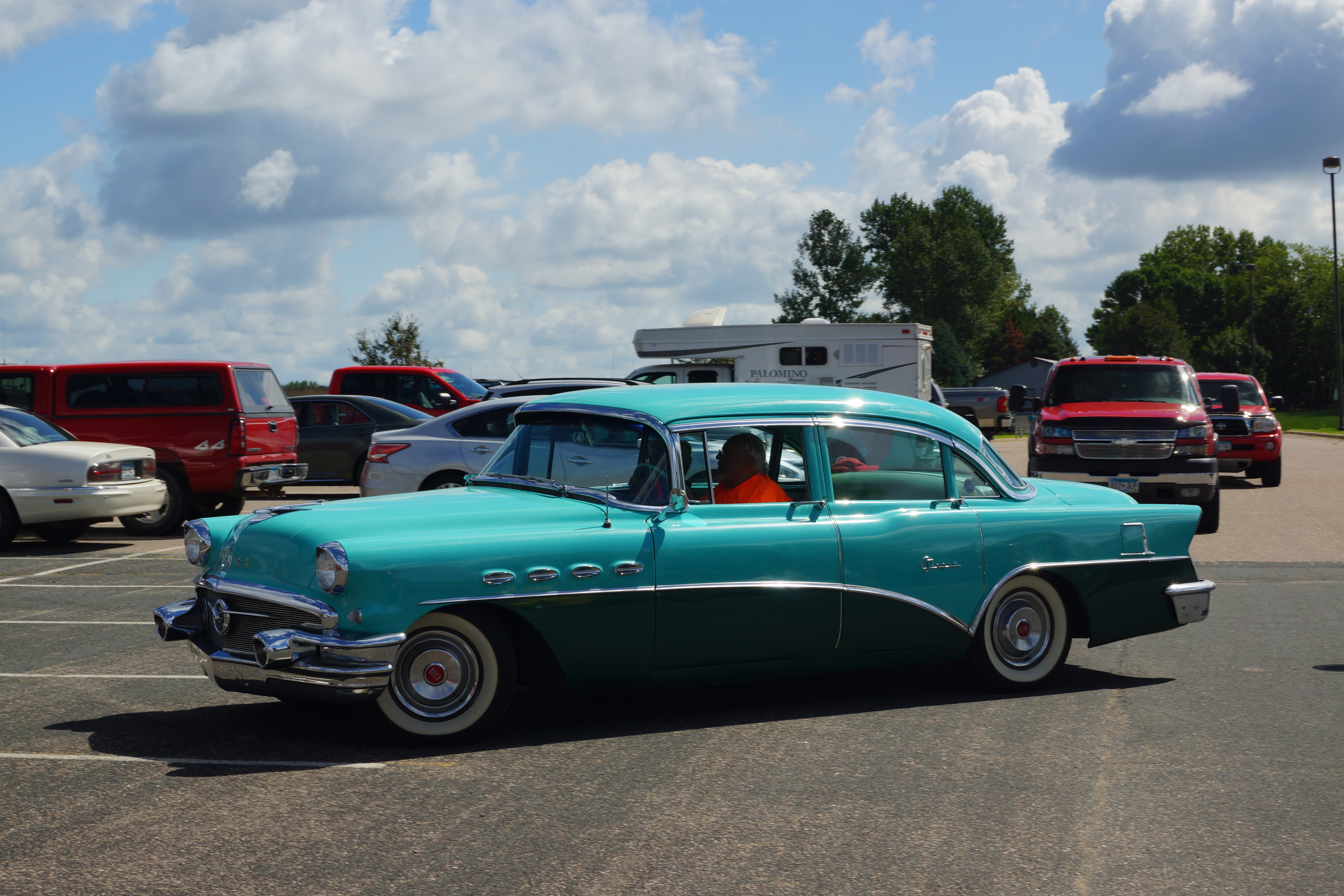
1956 Buick Super 4-Door Sedan

Using the new longer General Motors C-body, with vertical windshield pillars and the new "Panoramic" curved windshield, the Super for 1954 was a big Buick for the budget minded buyer. Identified by its three VentiPorts per fender, the "Super" script on the quarters and the series designation within the deck ornament, the Super shared other brightwork with the Roadmaster. Interiors were nylon and were plainer than in the Roadmaster. In 1953 The Buick-Berle Show introduced product placement commercials on TV, and later in 1955 The Honeymooners was one of the sponsors.

The Buick Super has a design resembling the 1955 Buick Century and Buick Century Riviera hardtop and the Ventiports were updated to four on each fender denoting its upgrade to senior level status. The Super did have the more expensive car's horizontal speedometer instrument panel. The convertible was upholstered in leather and had power-operated windows, seat and top, along with an outside rearview mirror on the left, as standard equipment. New features included a lighted ignition key slot, electric windows, and a roof rail cover. The Estate wagon was discontinued. Total sales fell to 118,630. Air conditioning was provided by Frigidaire optionally on sedans and hardtops, which consisted of a self contained unit that was retrofitted at the customers request.

In 1955 Buick's popular Super continued to combine the large C-body interior expanse with medium bracket interiors and performance. Supers had four of the new round VentiPorts per fender this year, with additional series script found on rear quarters and within the deck emblem. The side Sweepspear was unchanged from 1954. The larger bodied Buicks were readily identified by their more rounded contours, straight up windshield pillars and sedan rear quarter windows. Series 50 Super and 70 Roadmaster headlamp bezels also housed parking lights. Inside, a new Red Liner speedometer lay horizontally across the instrument panel. Interiors were trimmed in nylon/"Cordaveen" combinations, except for the convertible which featured leather seats. Standard Super equipment included trip mileage indicator, electric clock and, on convertibles, a power horizontal seat adjuster. Super sales rose to 132,463.

In 1956 although the Super was larger Buick, with vertical windshield posts and four VentiPorts per fender, it had a deep Sweepspear similar to the smaller Series 40 Special and Series 60 Century cars. Series script was found on rear quarters and within the deck and grille emblems. Interiors were "Cordaveen" and patterned nylon, except for convertibles which were all-"Cordaveen" trimmed and had power windows, horizontal seat adjustment(Six-way power seats were optional), and a power top in its standard form. Dynaflow was now standard on all Supers, along with foam seat cushions, a trunk light, electric clock, directional signals, front and rear armrests, sliding sunshades, cigarette lighter, glove compartment light, map light, dual horns, Step-On parking brake, Red Liner speedometer and trip mileage indicator. A new body style was the 4-door Riviera hardtop. Sales of the Super fell to 80,998.

== 1957–1958 ==
Fifth generation
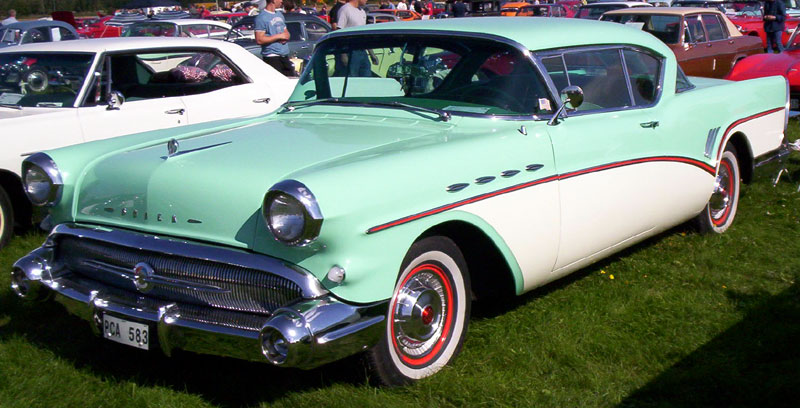
- 1957 Buick Super 2-Door Riviera

Overview
- Model years: 1957–1958
- Assembly: (main plant); Flint, Michigan, USA (Buick City) (branch assembly); Arlington, Texas, USA (Arlington Assembly); Doraville, Georgia, USA (Doraville Assembly) "Atlanta"; Kansas City, Kansas, USA (Fairfax Assembly); Linden, New Jersey, USA (Linden Assembly); South Gate, California, USA (South Gate Assembly); Wilmington, Delaware, USA (Wilmington Assembly)
- Designer: Harley Earl

Body and chassis
- Body style: 4-door Riviera hardtop 2-door Riviera hardtop 2-door convertible
- Platform: C-body
- Related: Cadillac Series 62; Buick Limited; Buick Roadmaster; Oldsmobile 98

Powertrain
- Engine: 364 cu in (6.0 L) Nailhead V8 OHV
- Transmission: Twin turbine Dynaflow automatic

Dimensions
- Wheelbase: 127.5 in (3,238 mm)
- Length: 1957: 215.3 in (5,469 mm); 1958: 219.2 in (5,568 mm)
- Width: 79.8 in (2,027 mm)
- Height: 60.0 in (1,524 mm)
- Curb weight: 4,500–4,700 lb (2,000–2,100 kg)

The Super used the new General Motors C-body for 1957. Larger than the Series 40 Special and Series 60 Century B-body, the Riviera body styles had different roof treatments as well. Supers had a group of three Chevrons on each rear quarter or door for series identification, in addition to the normal wording within the grille and deck emblems. Four VentiPorts were used on each front fender upgrading its trim status to senior level. Closed models were upholstered in Nylon/"Cordaveen" combinations while the convertible had an all-"Cordaveen" interior and featured power windows and seat controls as part of its equipment. Standard Super equipment included foam rubber seat cushions, automatic trunk lamp, Red Liner speedometer, glovebox lamp, dual horns, trip mileage indicator, directional signals, dual sunshades, color coordinated dash panel, and on the convertible, outside left-hand rearview mirror. The 4-door pillared sedan body style was gone. Engine displacement was increased to 364 cu in (6.0 L) on the Nailhead V8. Nevertheless, sales fell to 70,250, the lowest level with the exception of the abbreviated 1942 model year.

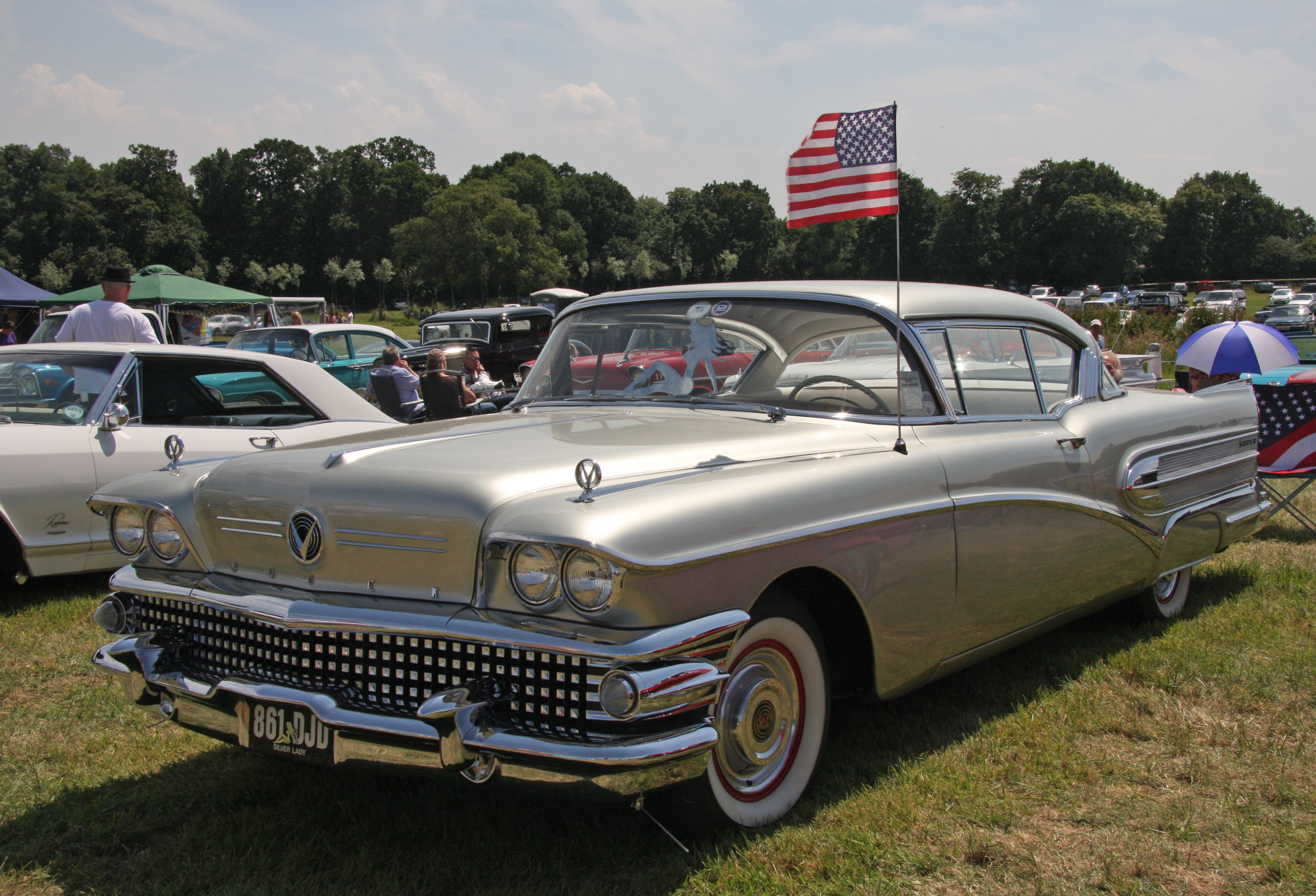
1958 Buick Super Riviera coupe

The once most popular Buick line was reduced to two body styles for 1958 with the elimination of the convertible. Side trim was similar to lesser series, except for the Super lettering on the rear fender flashes, but Supers were longer than the Series 40 Specials and Series 60 Centurys. The Super name was also lettered across the deck lid. Standard equipment included Variable-Pitch Dynaflow, power steering, power brakes, a safety-cushion instrument panel, fully carpeted floor, courtesy lights, full wheelcovers, foam rubber cushions, electric clocks, dual horns, ignition key light, glovebox, cigar lighter, trip mileage indicator, geared vent panes, bumper guards, variable speed wipers, Step-On parking brakes, and, on convertibles, an outside rearview mirror. Interiors were trimmed with gray cloth and vinyl or "Cordaveen" and vinyl. A plusher Custom interior was available at extra cost. Sales fell further to 42,388, the lowest with the exception of the wartime 1942 model year.

== 2008–2011 ==
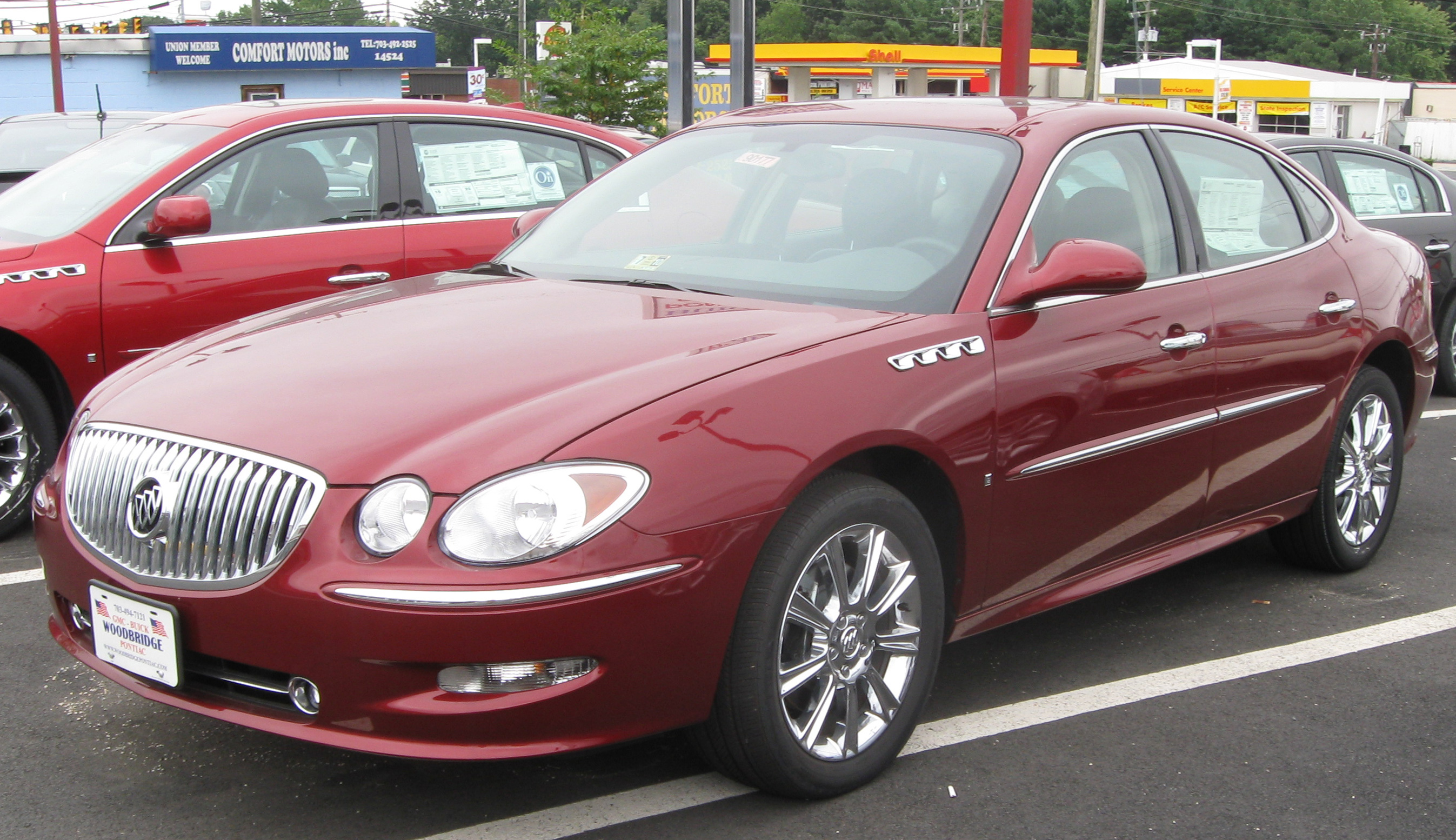
2009 Buick LaCrosse Super

The Super name was resurrected after a 50 year absence as a new performance trim level on LaCrosse (2008–2009) and Lucerne (2008–2011) models.

The LaCrosse Super was powered by a 300 horsepower 5.3 L small-block V8 engine while the Lucerne Super had a 292 horsepower 4.6 L Northstar V8 engine. Both came with high levels of standard equipment.
