= South Gate Assembly =

General Motors plant in Los Angeles, California

- Operated: 1936 - March 23, 1982
- Location: 2720 Tweedy Boulevard; South Gate, California
- Coordinates: 33°56′43″N 118°13′27″W
- Industry: Automotive
- Products: Automobiles
- Owner: General Motors

South Gate Assembly was a General Motors automobile plant located at 2720 Tweedy Boulevard in the Los Angeles suburb of South Gate, California. It opened in 1936 to build B-O-P (Buick-Oldsmobile-Pontiac) cars for sale on the West Coast. It was the first GM plant to build multiple car lines, resulting from a Depression-spawned move to cut production costs by sharing components and manufacturing. South Gate was the first of several B-O-P "branch" assembly plants (the second being the Buick-operated Linden plant), part of GM's strategy to have production facilities in major metropolitan cities. The originally Pontiac operated South Gate plant was part of GM's Southern California Division through 1942.

During World War II the plant built Stuart M-5 and M5A1 light tanks at 500 per month.

The location was under the management of GM's newly-created Buick-Oldsmobile-Pontiac Assembly Division created in 1945.

These "branch" plants built cars for distribution to a specific region, in South Gate's case the US West Coast. By 1949 it was producing full-size cars from the Pontiac, Oldsmobile, and Buick brands. During the mid-1950s it was General Motors' highest-output plant. Vehicles included the Oldsmobile 98, Pontiac Streamliner, and the Buick Special.

It added production of the Pontiac Tempest, Oldsmobile F-85, and Buick Special compact cars alongside the full-size cars for 1961. When the compacts became intermediates for 1964, their production ceased at South Gate, and Chevrolet Impala full-size production was added. Chevrolet production by the Buick-Oldsmobile-Pontiac Assembly Division led to it being renamed the GM Assembly Division (GMAD) in 1965.

The plant was converted from full-size car production to the subcompact Chevrolet Vega for 1975. This arrangement was short-lived, and GM returned the factory to building full-size Chevrolet, Oldsmobile, and Buick B-body vehicles for 1977. The Oldsmobile and Buick were dropped and the Cadillac DeVille added for 1979. Due to decreasing sales of the Chevrolet B-body cars, the plant was idled in March 1980. It was then retooled for subcompacts, building the 1982 Chevrolet Cavalier and Cadillac Cimarron. Slow sales and efforts to reduce air quality issues resulted in plant closure, with production ending on March 23, 1982.

The plant site was later environmentally remediated and used as the location for new schools, including South East High School (opened 2005), which were built by the Los Angeles Unified School District to relieve severe congestion in the existing schools of South Gate.

== See also ==
- California during World War II
