= Buick-Oldsmobile-Pontiac Assembly Division =

Buick-Oldsmobile-Pontiac Assembly Division was a designation applied from 1933–1965 to a group of factories operated by General Motors. The approach was modeled after the Chevrolet Assembly Division where cars were assembled from knock down kits originating from Flint Assembly and a collection of sites Chevrolet used before the company became a part of General Motors in 1917.

The terminology is confusing because most plants assembled more than just Chevrolet or B-O-P, and refers to the management structure only. The five brands originated vehicles from their respective "home" plants, where vehicles were assembled locally for their respective regions. Vehicles were also produced in "knock-down" kits and sent to the branch assembly locations. The "home" branches for both Buick and Chevrolet were in Flint, Michigan at two separate locations; Oldsmobile at Lansing, Michigan; Pontiac at Pontiac, Michigan; and Cadillac at Detroit, Michigan.

Plants operating under Chevrolet Assembly management prior to General Motors Assembly Division management (most established pre-1920) were located at St. Louis, Missouri; Janesville, Wisconsin; Buffalo, New York; Norwood, Ohio; Flint (#2), Michigan; Oakland, California; Tarrytown, New York; Lakewood, Georgia; Leeds, Missouri; Baltimore, Maryland; Los Angeles (Van Nuys), California; Ypsilanti (Willow Run), Michigan; and Lordstown, Ohio. Framingham, Massachusetts is unusual in that it changed from B-O-P to Chevy management prior to becoming GMAD.

- Arlington Assembly, Arlington, Texas (Dallas area)
- Doraville Assembly, Atlanta, Georgia
- Fairfax Assembly, Kansas City, Kansas
- Framingham Assembly, Framingham, Massachusetts (Boston area)
- Fremont Assembly, Fremont, California (San Francisco Bay area)
- Linden Assembly, Linden, New Jersey (New York City area)
- South Gate Assembly, South Gate, California (Los Angeles area)
- Wilmington Assembly, Wilmington, Delaware
