= Chevrolet Assembly Division =

Chevrolet Assembly Division was a designation used from 1933 to 1965. Fisher Body produced trimmed out bodies (firewall rearward) and then passed the bodies to the Chevrolet Assembly Division which completed the assembly of the vehicle. To streamline production, the General Motors Assembly Division was created that incorporated both divisions. From 1965 to 1972, GMAD was given responsibility for former Chevrolet / Fisher Body assembly plants.

Plants operated under Chevrolet Assembly management prior to General Motors Assembly Division management (most established pre-1920). Framingham, Massachusetts is unusual in that it changed from Buick-Oldsmobile-Pontiac Assembly management to Chevy management prior to becoming GMAD.

The terminology is confusing because most plants assembled more than just Chevrolet or B-O-P, and refers to the management structure only. The five brands originated vehicles from their respective "home" plants, where vehicles were assembled locally for their respective regions. Vehicles were also produced in "knock-down" kits and sent to the branch assembly locations. The "home" branches for both Buick and Chevrolet were in were Flint, Michigan at two separate locations; Oldsmobile at Lansing, Michigan; Pontiac at Pontiac, Michigan; and Cadillac at Detroit, Michigan.

As of March 6, 2019, the only plant that remains open from the old CAD Division is the Flint Truck Assembly.

- St. Louis Truck Assembly, St. Louis, Missouri
- Janesville Assembly, Janesville, Wisconsin
- Norwood Assembly, Norwood, Ohio
- Oakland Assembly, Oakland, California
- Flint Truck Assembly, Flint, Michigan
- North Tarrytown Assembly, Tarrytown, New York
- Buffalo Assembly, Buffalo, New York
- Lakewood Assembly, Atlanta, Georgia
- Leeds Assembly, Kansas City, Missouri
- Baltimore Assembly, Baltimore, Maryland
- Van Nuys Assembly, Los Angeles, California
- Willow Run Assembly, Ypsilanti, Michigan
- Framingham Assembly, Framingham, Massachusetts
- Lordstown Assembly, Lordstown, Ohio
