= Linden Assembly =

General Motors automobile factory

- Operated: 1937 - April 20, 2005
- Coordinates: 40°37′10.16″N 74°15′19.67″W
- Industry: Automotive
- Products: Automobiles
- Area: 2,600,000-square-foot (240,000 m^{2})
- Owner: General Motors

Linden Assembly was a General Motors automobile factory in Linden, New Jersey, United States. The plant operated from 1937 to 2005 and made cars, trucks and SUVs for various GM automotive divisions.

== History ==
The 2,600,000-square-foot (240,000 m^{2}) factory opened in 1937 to build Buick, Pontiac, and Oldsmobile vehicles from "knock down kits". Linden was the second of several B-O-P "branch" assembly plants (the first being the Pontiac-operated South Gate plant), part of GM's strategy to have production facilities in major metropolitan cities. The originally Buick operated Linden plant was part of GM's Linden Division through 1942. A total of 343,000 automobiles between 1937 and 1941 ( Buicks, Pontiacs and Oldsmobiles).

During World War II, as part of the Eastern Aircraft Division (EAD) of General Motors, the plant was also used to produce fighter planes for the United States Navy, primarily the FM-1 Wildcat and the FM-2 Wildcat, an improved version of the Grumman F4F Wildcat, as it is adjacent to the Linden Airport. After automobile production resumed, it was under the management of GM's newly created Buick-Oldsmobile-Pontiac Assembly Division created in 1945. The Buick-Oldsmobile-Pontiac Assembly Division was renamed the GM Assembly Division (GMAD) in 1965.

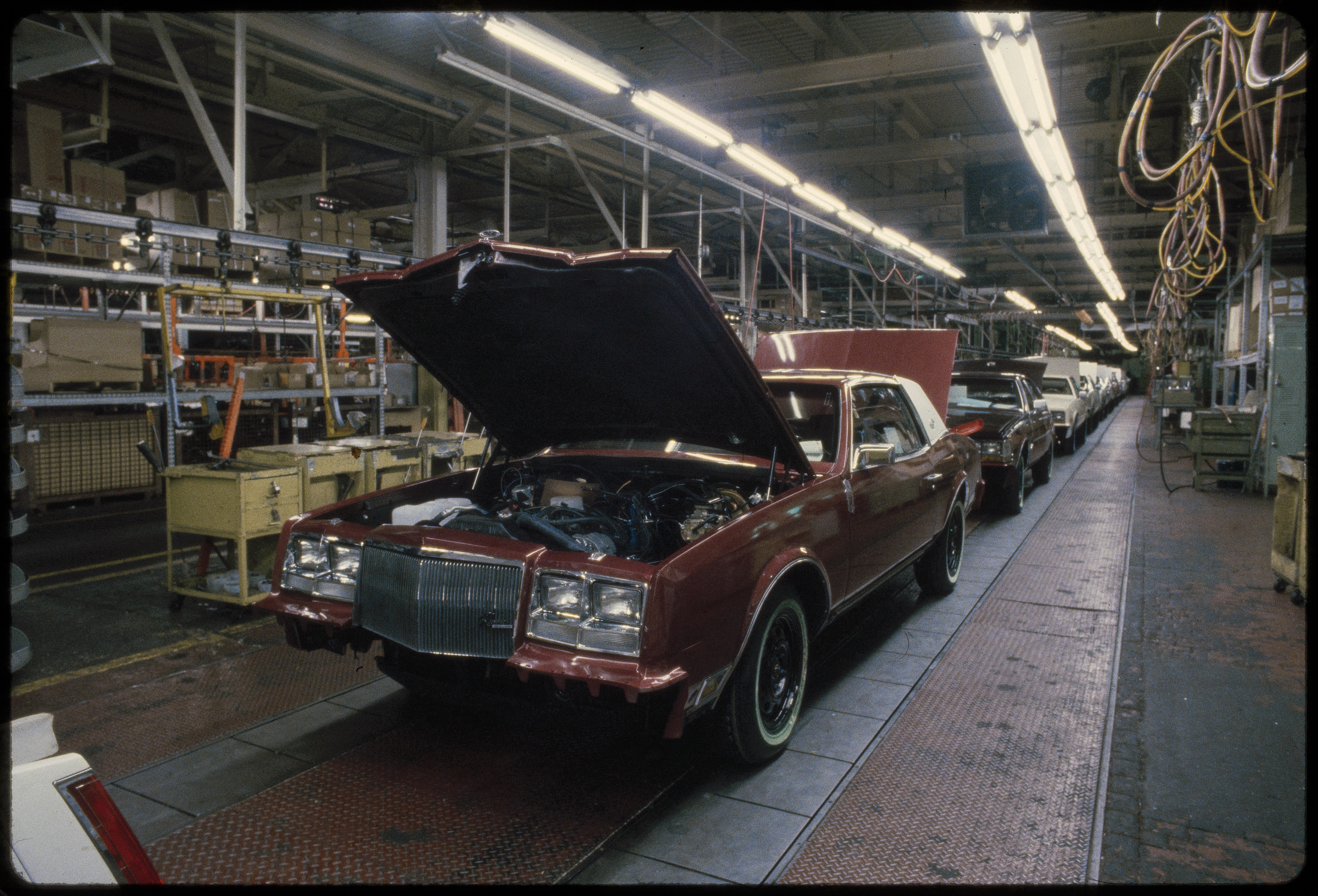
A Buick car in the assembly line in the 1980s

By the 1970s, the plant was producing luxury models from Buick, Cadillac, and Oldsmobile. In 1971, Linden Assembly became the first plant outside Cadillac's home plant in Detroit to assemble Cadillacs when it began to assemble Cadillac C-body cars like the DeVille. In 1979, Linden became the sole source for all three of GM's E-body personal luxury coupes, the Oldsmobile Toronado, Buick Riviera, and Cadillac Eldorado. The closely related K-body Cadillac Seville was added in 1980. In the mid-1980s, the factory was retooled to produce the new L-body Chevrolet Beretta and Corsica, which began production in 1987.

Beginning in September 1991, the facility was idled and retooled for truck and sport utility vehicle assembly. The workers who accepted a severance package were pleased to leave, whereas the staying workers were displeased.

After reopening in 1993, it produced the Chevrolet S-10, GMC Sonoma, Chevrolet Blazer, and GMC Jimmy models. In February 2002, GM announced plans to shut down the plant in 2004, though the closure date changed after negotiations with the state government and union. A white 2005 four-door Chevrolet Blazer was the last vehicle to leave the line on April 20, 2005.

In July 2007, GM and the City of Linden settled numerous tax appeals going back to 1983; Linden agreed to pay GM $4.8 million, which cleared the way for the sale and subsequent redevelopment of the 104-acre (0.42 km^{2}) site. The property was sold for $77 million on February 1, 2008 to Duke Realty, which redeveloped the facility as an industrial and retail site called Legacy Commerce Center. Most of the former factory structures were demolished by August 2008.

== Vehicles produced ==
=== Cars ===
- -1957-58 Buick Special
- -1958 Buick Century
- -1958 Buick Roadmaster
- -1958 Buick Super
- 1959-1976 Buick Electra
- 1959-1963 Buick Invicta
- 1959-1976 Buick LeSabre
- 1963-1964 Buick Wildcat
- 1979-1985 Buick Riviera
- 1971-1978 Cadillac de Ville series
- 1971-1976 Cadillac Calais
- 1971-1985 Cadillac Eldorado
- 1980-1985 Cadillac Seville
- 1987-1991 Chevrolet Beretta
- 1987-1991 Chevrolet Corsica
- 1941-1978 Oldsmobile 98
- 1949-1976 Oldsmobile 88
- 1961-1966 Oldsmobile Starfire
- 1964-1965 Oldsmobile Jetstar I
- 1968-1970 Oldsmobile Cutlass/Cutlass Supreme
- 1968-1970 Oldsmobile 442
- 1979-1985 Oldsmobile Toronado
- 1954-1957 Pontiac Star Chief
- 1958-1970 Pontiac Bonneville
- 1959-1970 Pontiac Catalina
- 1960-1970 Pontiac Ventura
- 1962-1967 Pontiac Grand Prix
- 1964-1967 Pontiac 2+2
- ?-1970 Pontiac Executive

=== Trucks and SUVs ===
- 1994-2004 Chevrolet S-10
- 1995-2005 Chevrolet Blazer
- 1994-2004 GMC Sonoma
- 1995-2005 GMC Jimmy
