= Pontiac Catalina =

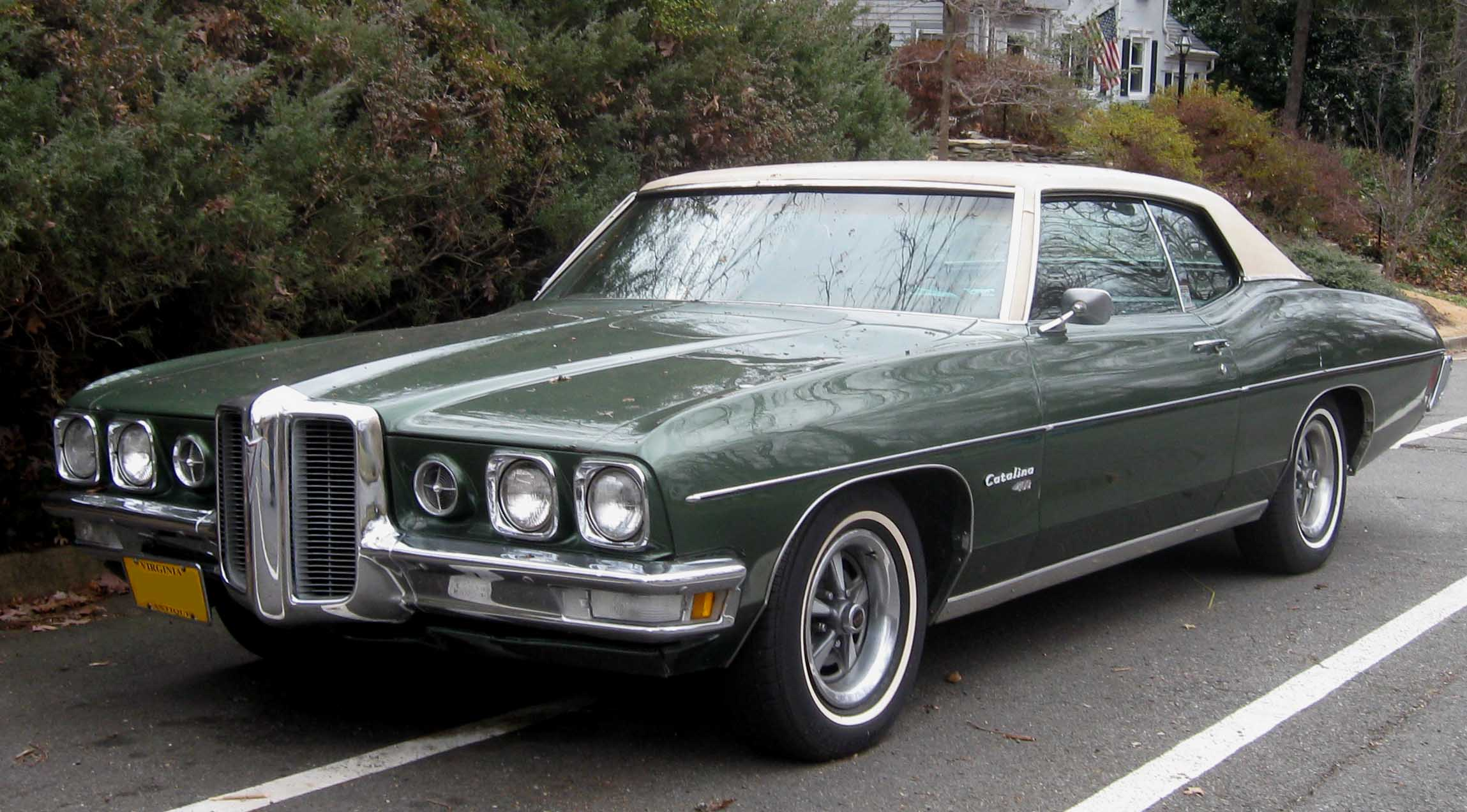
- 1970 Pontiac Catalina hardtop coupe

Overview
- Manufacturer: Pontiac (General Motors)
- Production: 1950–1981

Body and chassis
- Class: Full-size
- Layout: FR layout
- Platform: GM B platform

Chronology
- Predecessor: Pontiac Chieftain
- Successor: Pontiac Bonneville

The Pontiac Catalina is a full-size automobile produced by Pontiac from 1950 to 1981. Initially, the name was a trim line on hardtop body styles, first appearing in the 1950 Chieftain Eight and DeLuxe Eight lines. In 1959, it became a separate model as the "entry-level" full-size Pontiac.

The Catalina was Pontiac's most popular model, available in multiple body styles, and served as the donor platform for the popular Pontiac Grand Prix, Pontiac 2+2, Pontiac Ventura, and the Pontiac Safari station wagon.

When the second-generation Pontiac Tempest was introduced in 1964, lessons learned from the Catalina's introduction of the Grand Prix led to the introduction of the Pontiac GTO, to include the 389 cu in (6.4 L) Pontiac V8.

== As a trim level (1950–1958) ==
The name "Catalina" was first used on the 1950 Chieftain Series 25/27 hardtop, Pontiac's top trim level package at the time, and later added to the Star Chief in 1954, Pontiac's equivalent of the Chevrolet Bel Air. Originally referred to as "hard-top convertibles", these vehicles offered pillarless design in the door and window areas, along with the top-grade convertible appointments. The advantage this fixed-roof design offered is its sporty, airy feeling without the expense and drawbacks normally associated with convertibles. With the exception of the 1958 Bonneville, all Pontiac hardtops were designated "Catalinas" from 1950 to 1958. Powered by a flathead straight-eight engine at the time of its debut, it would receive Pontiac's new OHV 287 cu in (4.7 L) Pontiac V8 four years later. A one-piece windshield was new for 1954. A padded safety dash became available in 1956. The names "Catalina" and "Bel Air" are upscale communities in Southern California, United States.

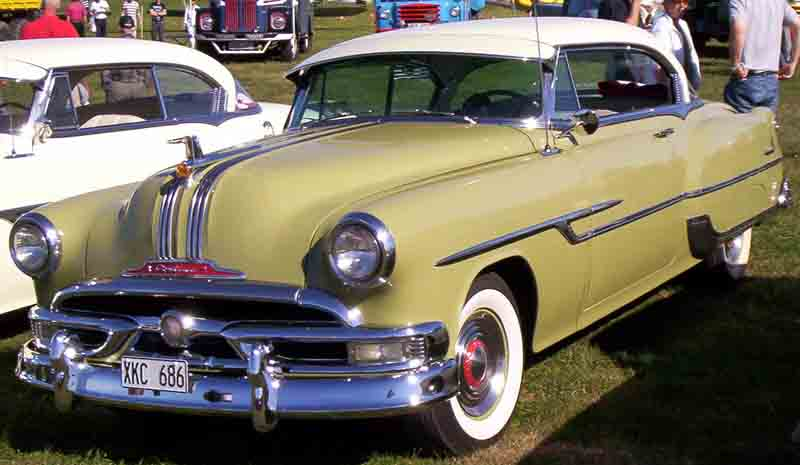
1953 Pontiac Chieftain Catalina hardtop coupe

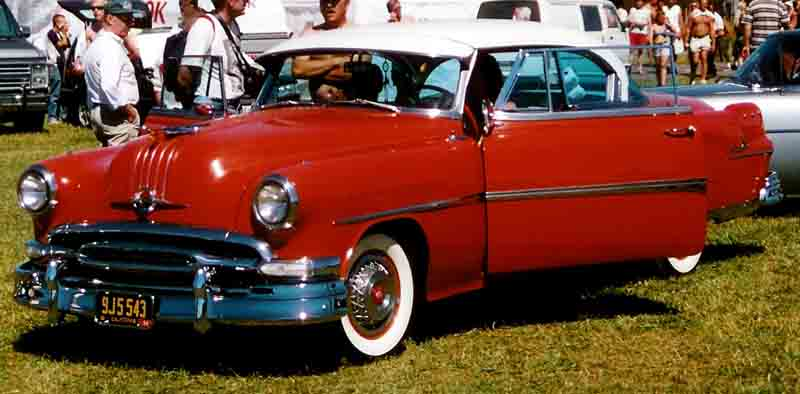
1954 Pontiac Star Chief Catalina hardtop coupe

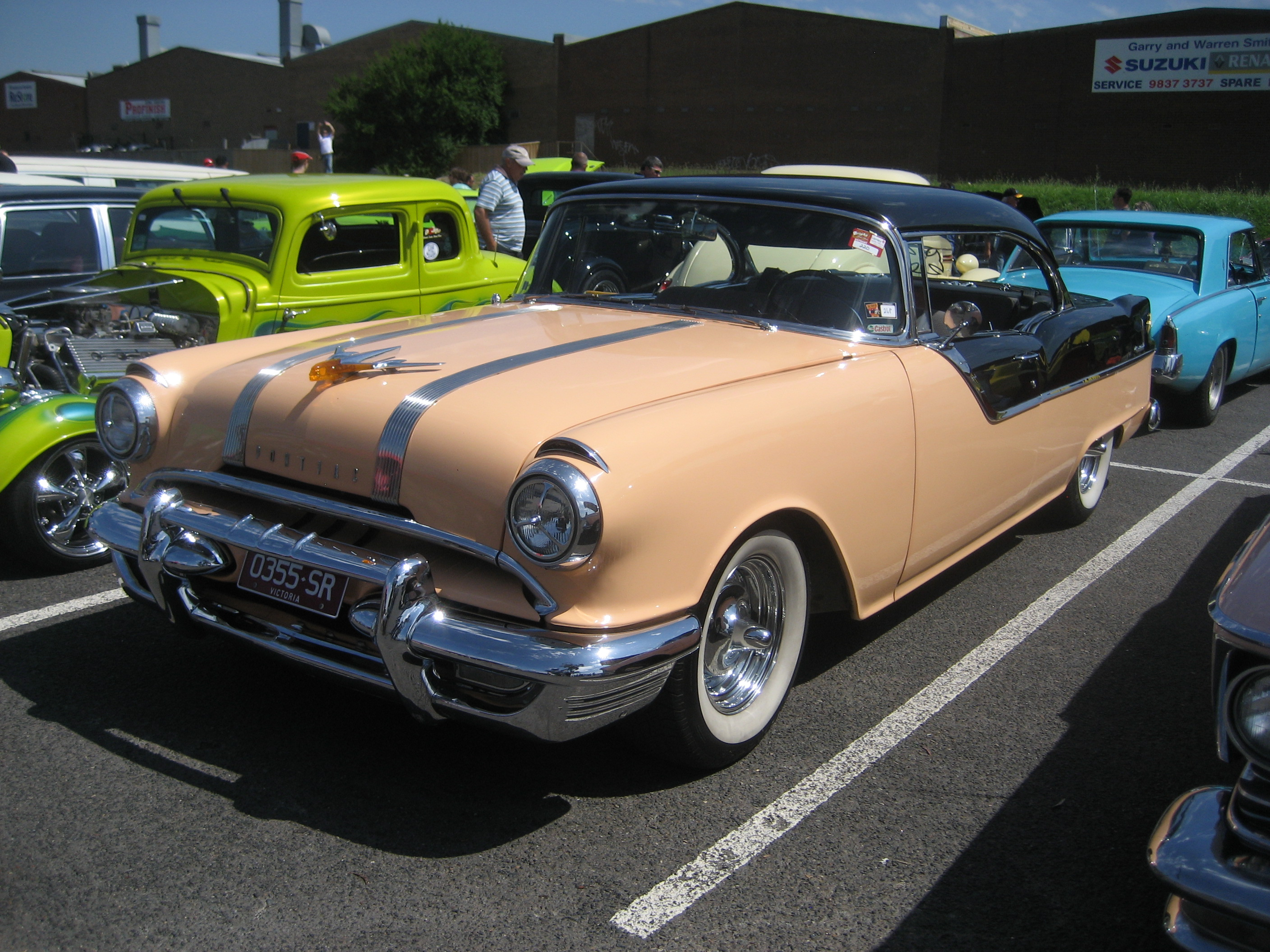
1955 Pontiac Chieftain Catalina hardtop coupe

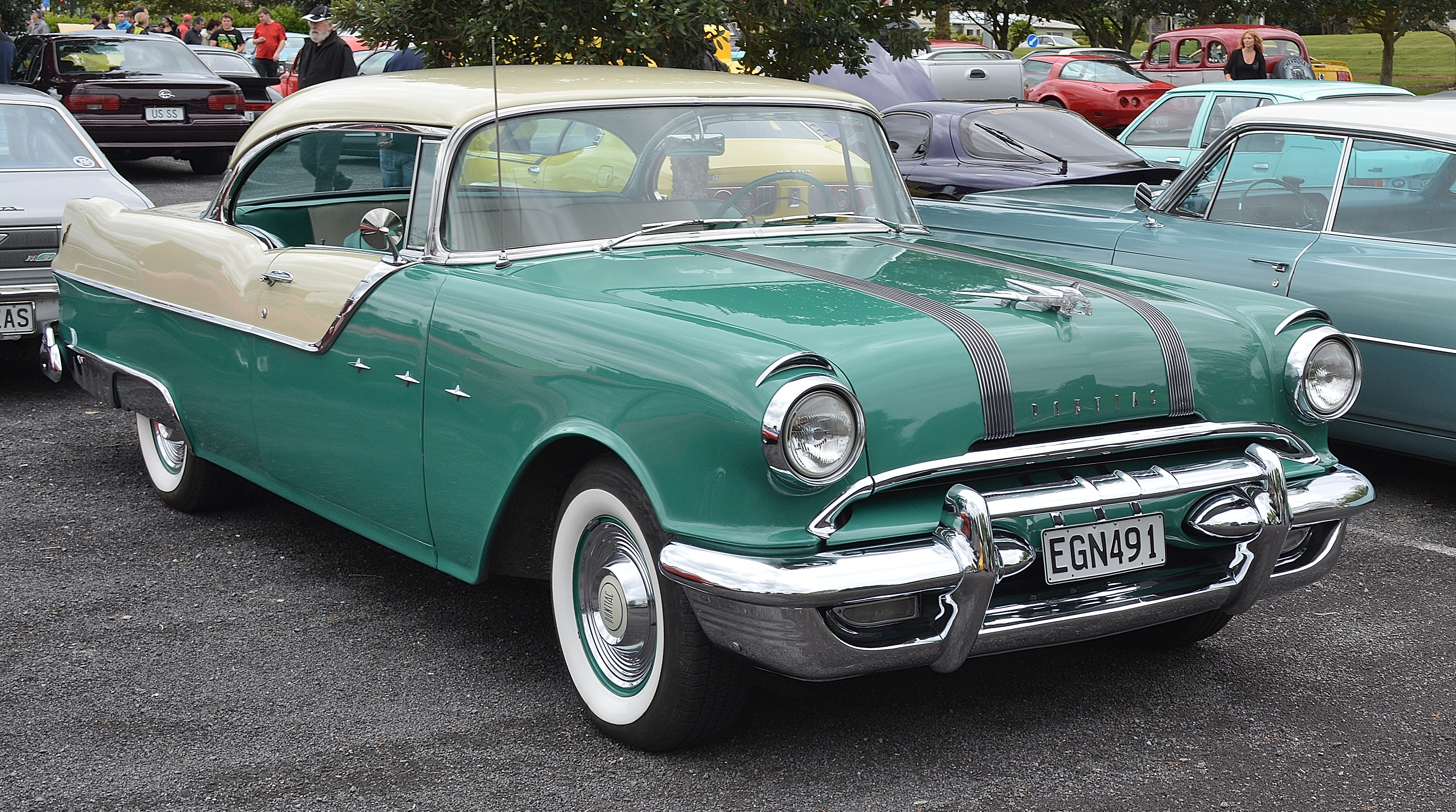
1955 Pontiac Star Chief Custom Catalina

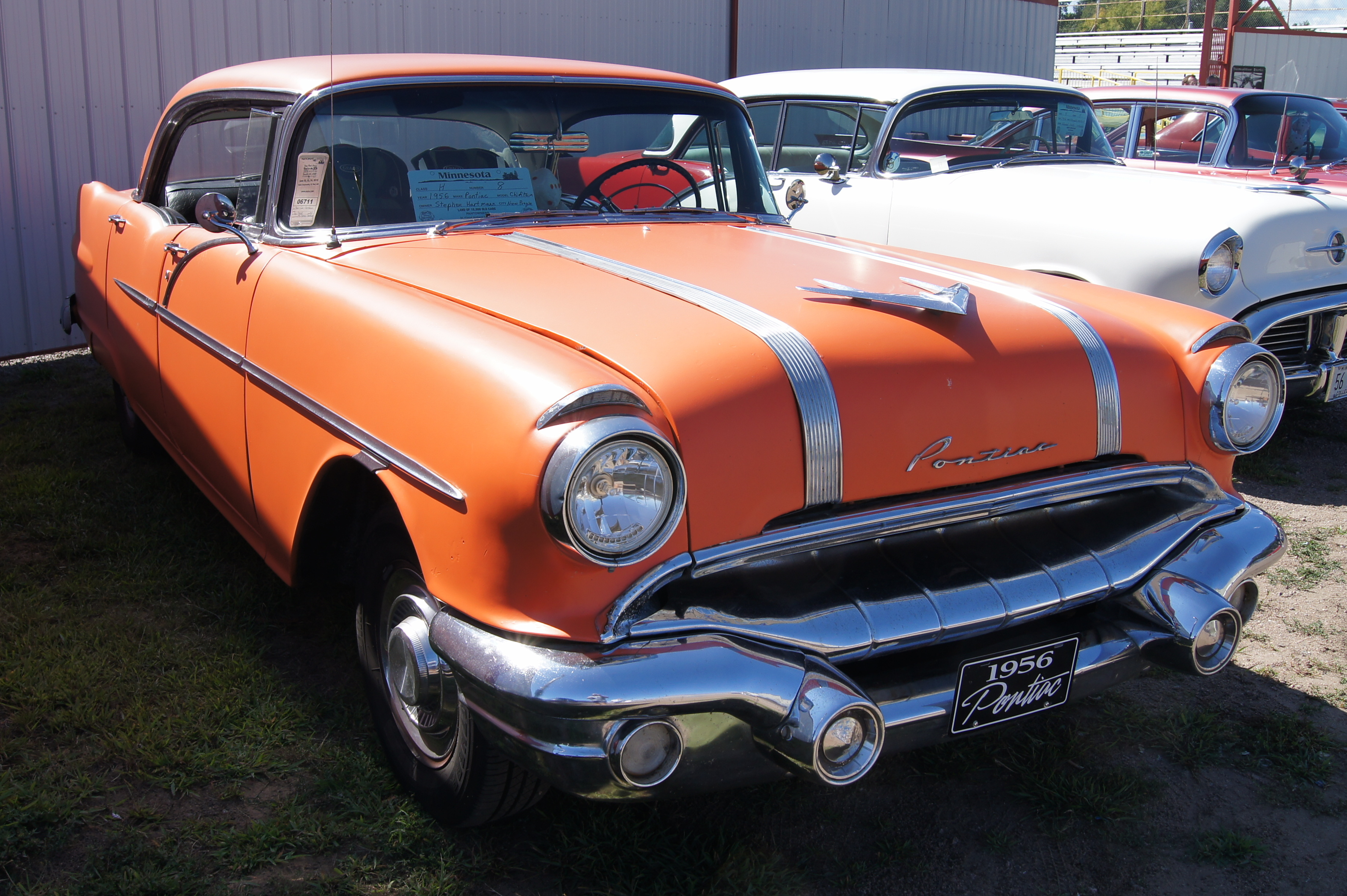
1956 Pontiac Chieftain Catalina hardtop sedan

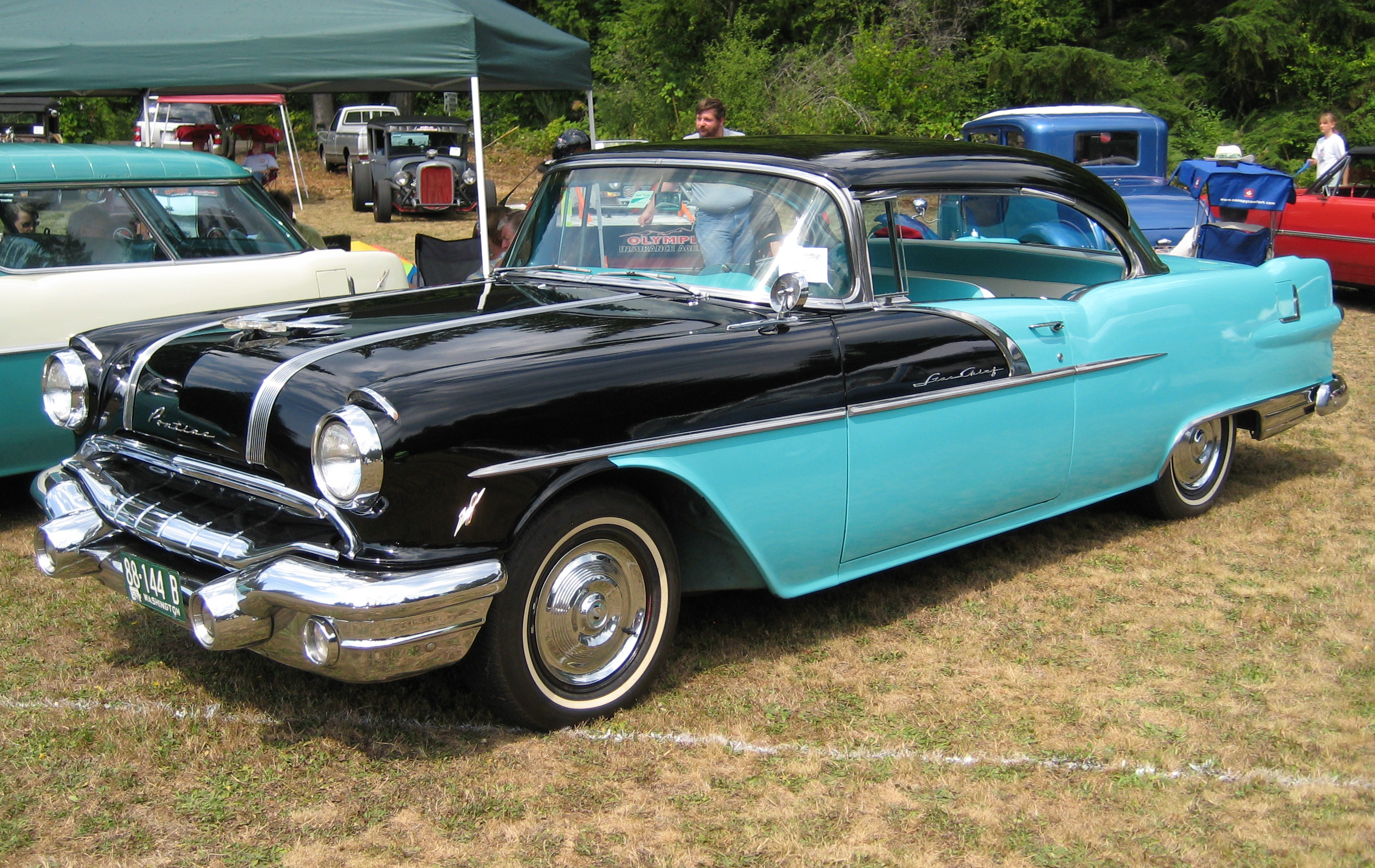
1956 Pontiac Star Chief Two-door Catalina

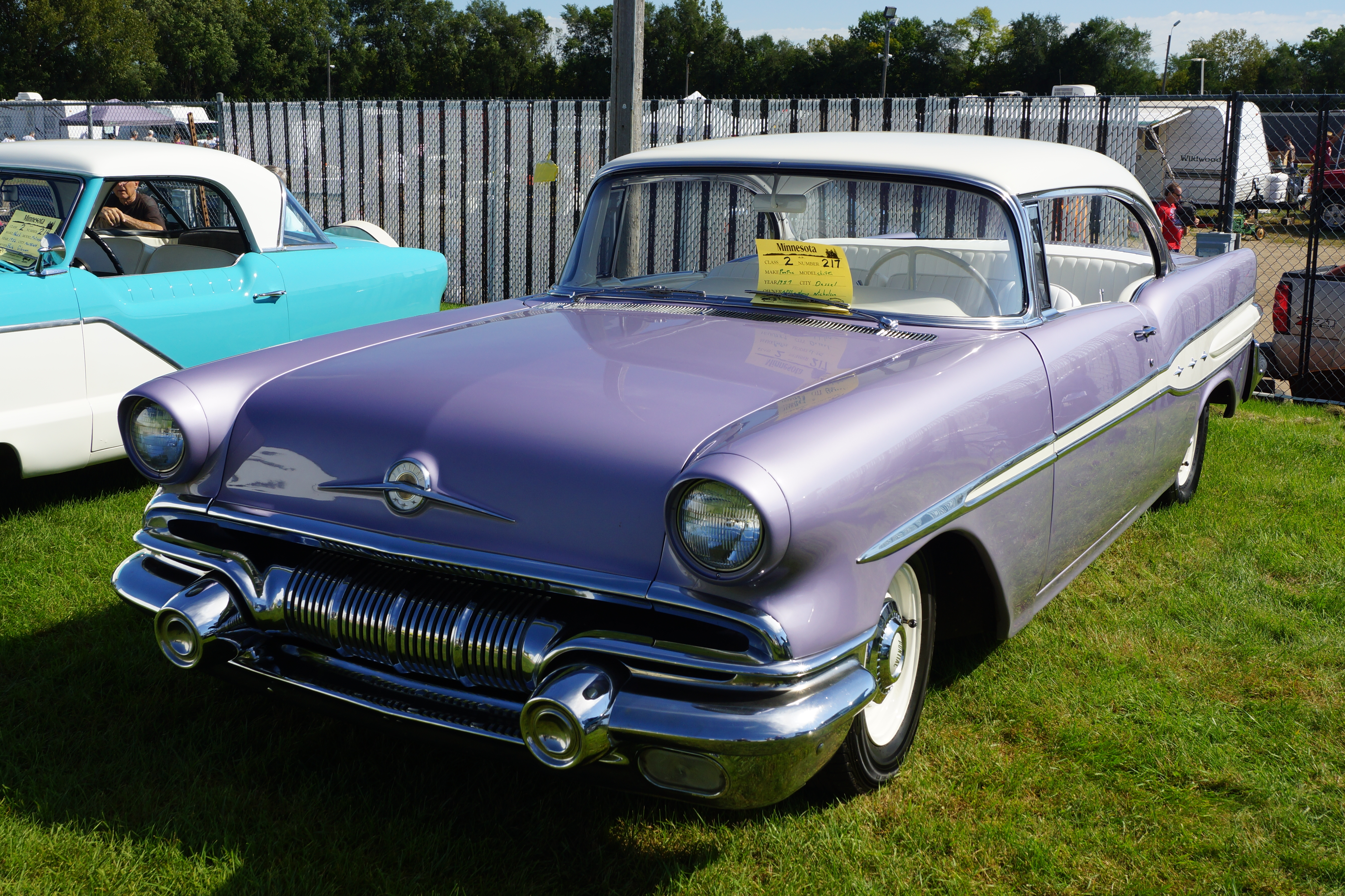
1957 Pontiac Chieftain Catalina hardtop coupe

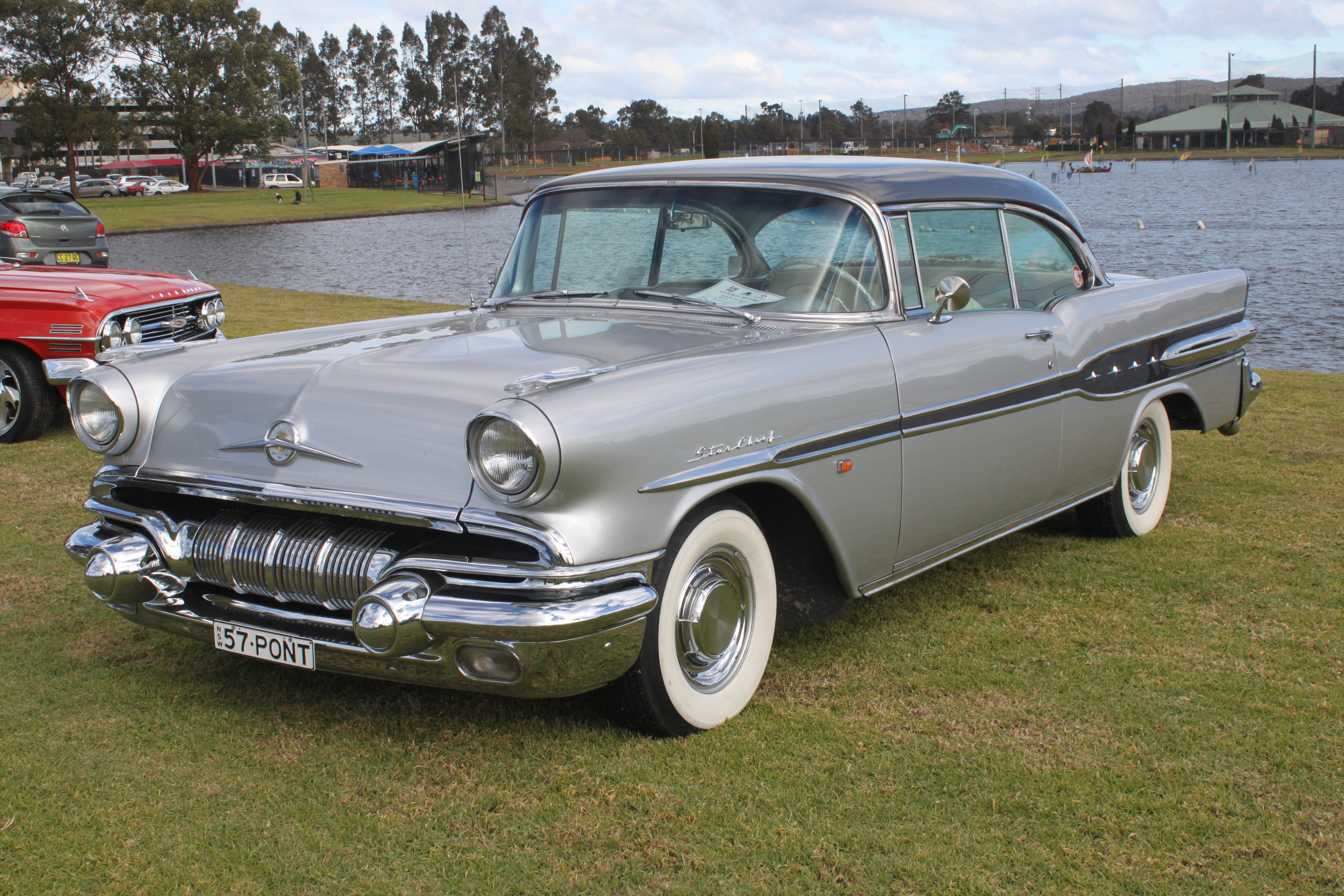
1957 Pontiac Star Chief Catalina hardtop coupe

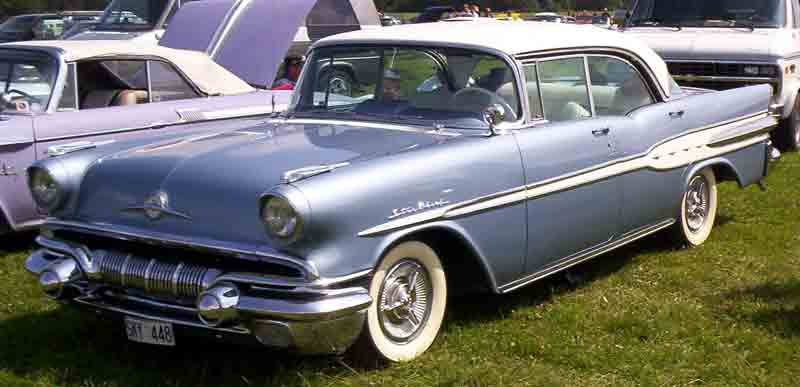
1957 Pontiac Star Chief Catalina hardtop sedan

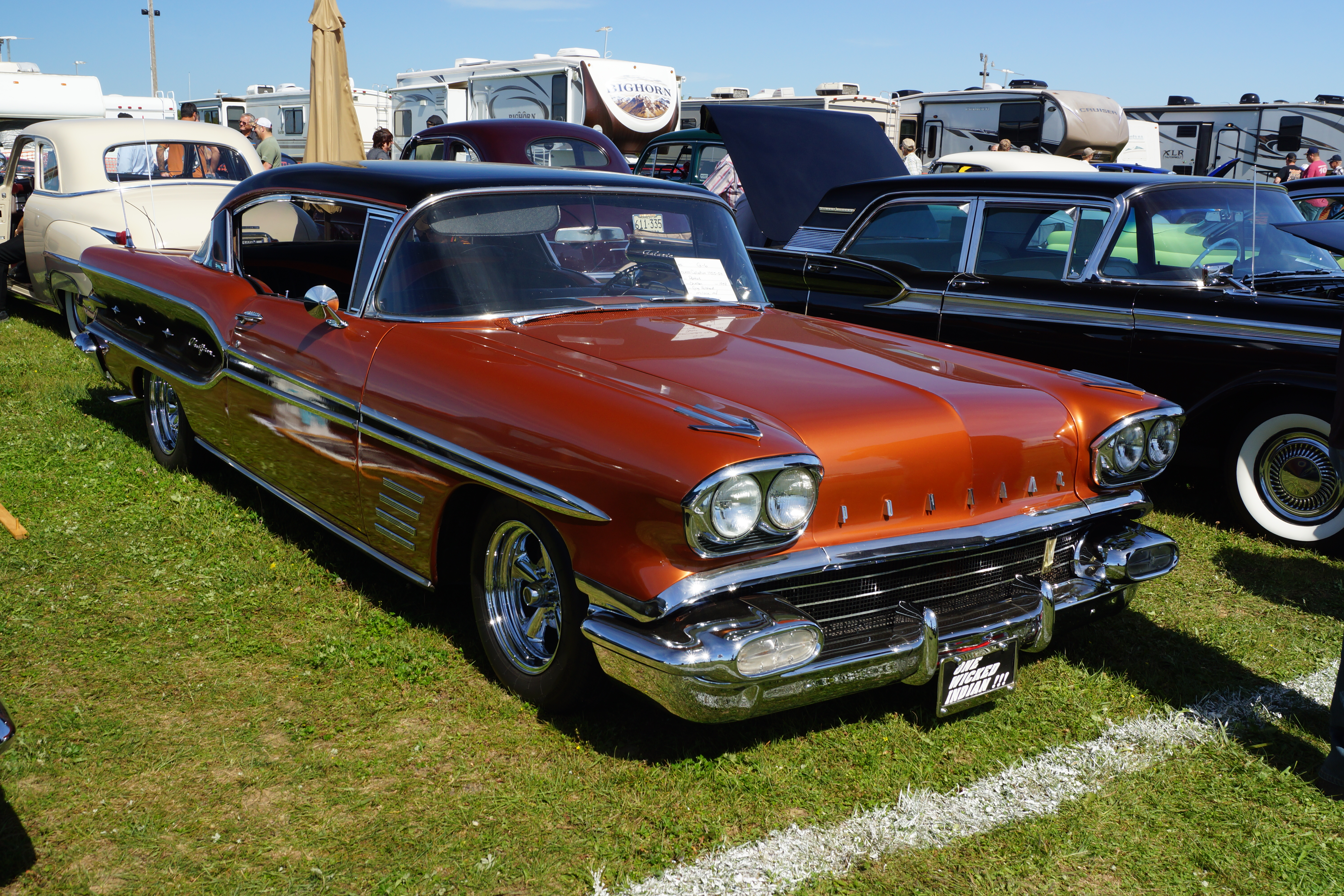
1958 Pontiac Chieftain Catalina hardtop coupe

== As a stand-alone model ==
=== 1959–1960 ===
First generation
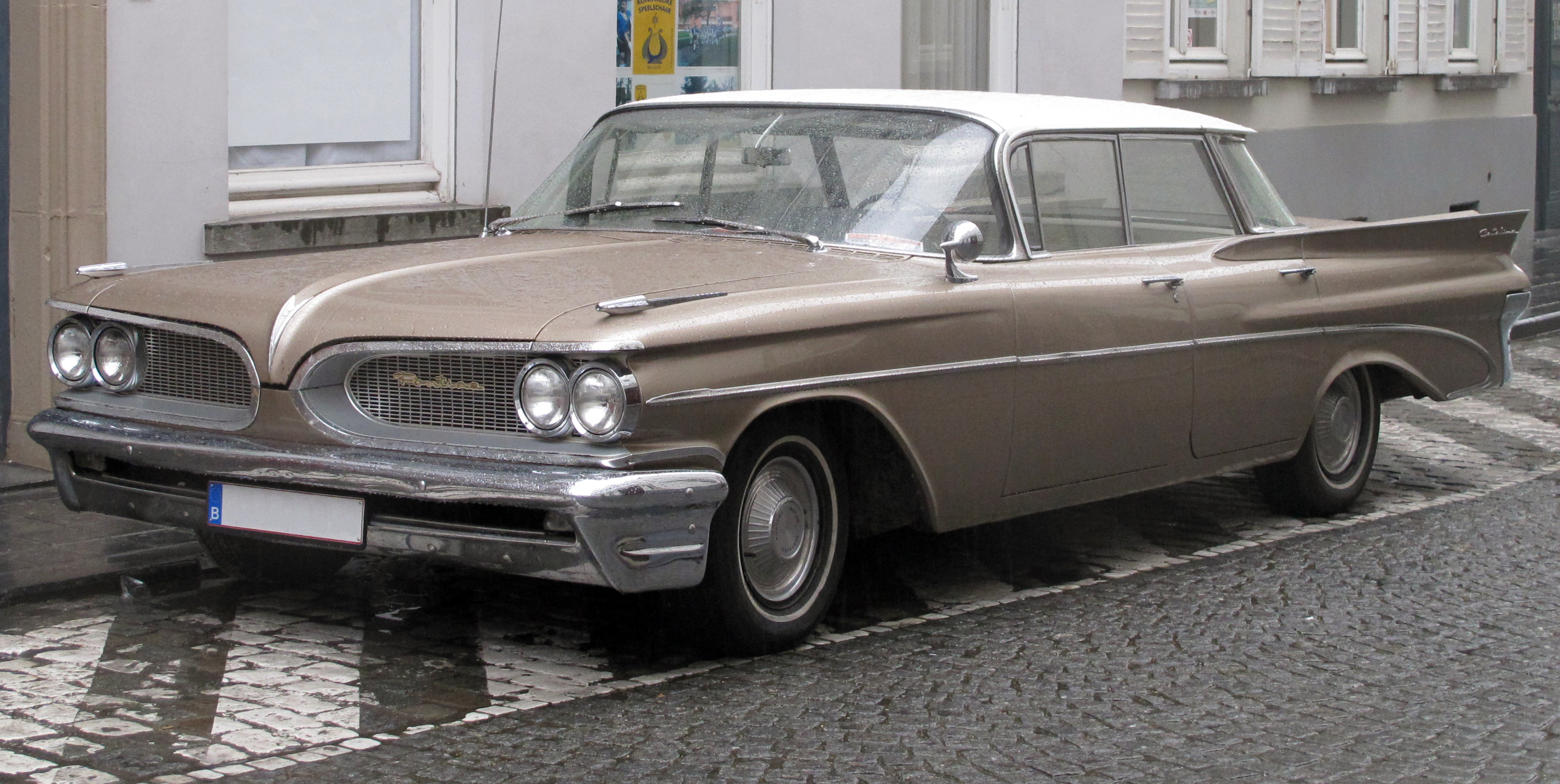
- 1959 Pontiac Catalina Vista HT sedan

Overview
- Also called: Pontiac Ventura
- Model years: 1959–1960
- Assembly: (main plant); Pontiac, Michigan, US (Pontiac Assembly) (branch assembly); Arlington, Texas, US (Arlington Assembly); Kansas City, Kansas, US (Fairfax Assembly); Linden, New Jersey, US (Linden Assembly); South Gate, California, US (South Gate Assembly); Wilmington, Delaware, US (Wilmington Assembly); Oshawa, Ontario, Canada (Laurentian) (Oshawa Car Assembly); General Motors Holden, South Australia, Australia (Laurentian); General Motors New Zealand, Petone, New Zealand (Laurentian)

Body and chassis
- Body style: 2-door coupe 2-door convertible 4-door sedan 4-door station wagon
- Layout: FR layout
- Related: Chevrolet Bel Air; Oldsmobile 88; Buick LeSabre

Powertrain
- Engine: 389 cu in (6.4 L) V8
- Transmission: 3-speed manual 4-speed automatic

Dimensions
- Wheelbase: 122 in (3,099 mm)
- Length: 213.7 in (5,428 mm)
- Width: 80 in (2,032 mm)

For 1959, Pontiac dropped the name "Chieftain" and "Super Chief" models for its junior-level series and renamed it "Catalina", while demoting the former top-line Star Chief to intermediate status eliminating the two door Star Chief Catalina, the only hardtop for the Star Chief was the four door hardtop and expanding the Bonneville nameplate to a senior series that included sedans, coupes, convertibles and Safari station wagons.

In the lower-priced Catalina line, Pontiac division advertising placed higher emphasis on the top trimmed two- and four-door hardtops, convertible and Safari station wagons instead of the pillared two- and four-door sedan variants despite the fact that the four-door sedan was the best seller in this line.

The Catalina, though it was the lowest-priced full-sized Pontiac, was priced and trimmed below the Chevrolet Impala due to GM's overlapping price structure formula only a step below the Buick LeSabre and Oldsmobile 88 in trim and appointments but priced about $100 to $200 less. Catalinas also came standard with more amenities than Chevrolet models and included a larger and more powerful V8 engine of 389 cubic inches, compared to the Chevy's six-cylinder or 283 and 348 cubic-inch V8s. Pontiacs also benefited from a much better automatic transmission than their Chevrolet counterparts - the four-speed Hydra-Matic - versus the Chevy's two-speed Powerglide.

Though the basic Catalina started out with a full rubber mat, it could be ordered with full carpeting, glovebox and trunk lights; dual front ashtrays, cigar lighter, glove compartment snack bar (two cup indents on the glovebox door that could be opened for use at drive-in restaurants) were standard, heater-defroster and a choice of cloth and Morrokide vinyl upholstery or expanded Morrokide (all-vinyl trim) optional. Pontiac buyers could add even more trimmings for a few dollars more by ordering the "decor group" which added full wheel covers, deluxe steering wheel, chrome pedal trim plates and more. Also offered from 1962 to 1970 on most Catalina models was the Ventura custom interior (which was a separate model from 1960 to 1961), which included the interior and exterior upgrades offered with the extra-cost decor group option plus a slightly more luxurious interior of cloth or Morrokide trims similar to the costlier Pontiac Star Chief or Executive depending on the year.

Catalinas and other 1959 Pontiacs were completely restyled on a new General Motors B-body that was shared by all GM divisions from Chevrolet to Cadillac, replacing the previous A-body utilized for Pontiacs and Chevrolets that was used only for 1958. Twin tailfins, two on each side, were new and only in 1959. Styling highlights include thin-pillar rooflines and greater use of glass for increased visibility. Pillared four-door sedans feature six-window styling, while two-door hardtops were dubbed "bubbletops" due to the large wraparound bubble windshield and thin c-pillar and large rear window; four-door hardtops featured flat-blade rooflines with an overhang past the rear window. Wheelbases were 122" for Catalina and 124" for Star Chief and Bonneville inches, but overall length on Catalina was 7" shorter than Bonneville and Star Chief at 213.7 inches (5,430 mm).

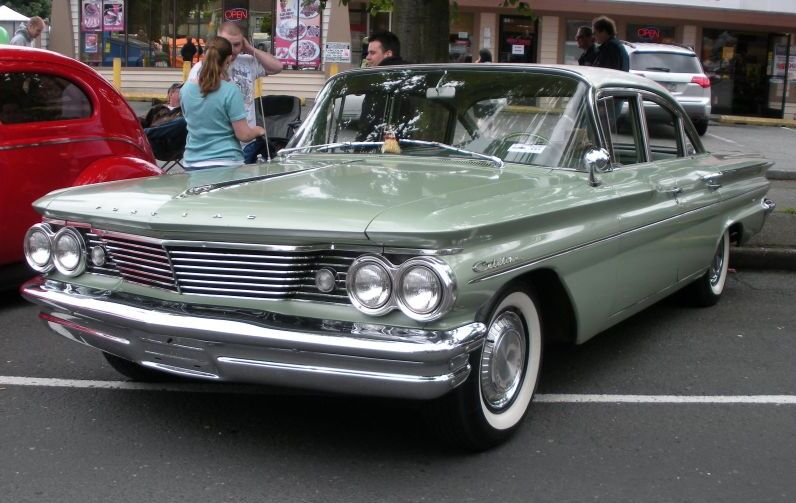
1960 Pontiac Catalina sedan

The 1959 Pontiacs featured a "split grille", which came about by accident when the styling studio was exploring grille design. Experimentally, a design for a conventional, full width, oval grille, containing horizontal quad headlights, was cut in two and the halves transposed. With the lights remaining at the extremities, this gave the split center, open ended look of the '59 Catalina. Along with the wider body came a 5" wider chassis in which the wheels were moved out towards the fenders. This not only improved the appearance of the car but led to improvements in ride and handling - spawning the term "wide track" ride and handling which Pontiac would use in its promotional efforts for many years to come.

All Pontiacs were powered by various renditions of the new 389 cubic-inch Tempest V8 (which was later renamed from 1961 as the Trophy V-8), which was basically a version of the previous 370 cubic-inch V8 with stroke increased to 3.75 inches (the 370ci was used in 1958-model Pontiacs and based on the Pontiac V8 design introduced in 1955). Catalinas came standard with a 235 horsepower (175 kW) version of the 389 with two-barrel carburetor and 8.6 to 1 compression mated to the three-speed manual transmission. When the optional four-speed Hydramatic transmission was ordered, the standard engine was 280 horsepower (210 kW) version of the same engine with higher 10.5 to 1 compression ratio. Available as a no-cost option with the Hydramatic transmission was the 215-horsepower 389 (dubbed the Economy V8) with 8.6 to 1 compression ratio which burned cheaper regular gasoline, instead of the premium and super-premium fuels required for the high-compression engines, and capable of achieving more than 20 MPG on the highway. Optionally available at extra cost were higher-power versions of the 389 V8 with four-barrel carburetion rated at 283 horsepower (211 kW) with manual gearbox or 303 hp with Hydramatic, a 4-barrel carburetor version with a horsepower rating of 318 hp, or "Tri-Power" options with triple two-barrel carburetors and 330 hp or 345 hp (257 kW).

For 1960, Catalina and other Pontiacs received a minor facelifting of the '59 bodyshell with a new full-width horizontal bar grille similar to the 1930s Cord 810/812 replacing 1959's split grille (for this year only-the split grille returned in 1961) and round taillights. Bodystyles and drivetrain offerings were unchanged from 1959. New to the option list was a "Sportable Transistor" radio that could be used in the car in place of the regular "in-dash" radio or removed from the car for use as a portable with battery power, and the upgraded trim package as a two-door or four door hardtop called the Pontiac Ventura. Also new for 1960 were the optional "Al-Fin" eight lug-nut aluminum wheels with integral brake drums that not only enhanced the car's looks but also provided improved stopping power. Another popular option for performance enthusiasts was the "Safe-T-Track" limited slip differential. In the suspension department the front track was increased from the 59's 63 7/8 in (1,620 mm) to 64 in (1,600 mm). In the engine compartment the so-called "gusher type" cooling system (with cooling liquid entering the engine over the exhaust valves, reverse of what is more normally done) was replaced by the so-called "Equa-flow" type (with conventional V-8 cooling configuration). Turn signals were standard, while the A/C was $430 and padded dash was $19.

Inside, a revised instrument panel featured a new horizontal sweep speedometer along with minor changes in trim patterns.

Pontiac Catalina Production Figures
	Yearly Total
1959	231,561
1960	210,934
Total	442,495

=== 1961–1964 ===
Second generation
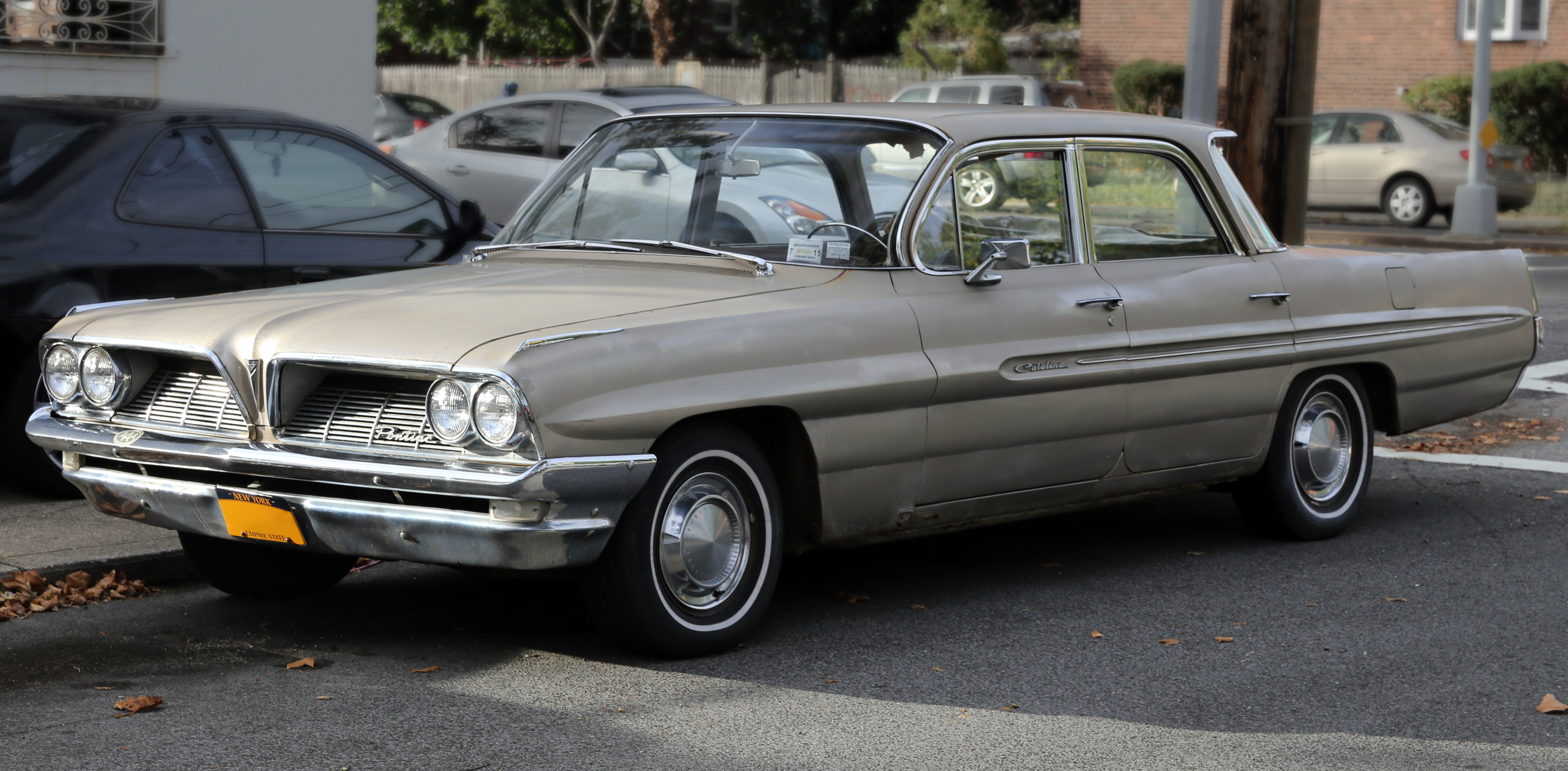
- 1961 Pontiac Catalina 4-door sedan

Overview
- Also called: Pontiac 2+2; Pontiac Ventura
- Model years: 1961–1964
- Assembly: (main plant); Pontiac, Michigan, US (Pontiac Assembly) (branch assembly); Arlington, Texas, US (Arlington Assembly); Doraville, Georgia, US (Doraville Assembly); Kansas City, Kansas, US (Fairfax Assembly); Linden, New Jersey, US (Linden Assembly); South Gate, California, US (South Gate Assembly); Wilmington, Delaware, US (Wilmington Assembly); Oshawa, Ontario, Canada (Laurentian) (Oshawa Car Assembly); General Motors Holden, South Australia, Australia (Laurentian); General Motors New Zealand, Petone, New Zealand (Laurentian)

Body and chassis
- Body style: 2-door Hardtop; 2-door convertible 2-door sedan 4-door sedan 4-door Hardtop; 4-door station wagon
- Related: Chevrolet Bel Air; Oldsmobile 88; Buick LeSabre

Powertrain
- Engine: 389 cu in (6.4 L) Pontiac V8; 421 cu in (6.9 L) Pontiac V8
- Transmission: 3-speed manual 3-speed Roto-Hydramatic automatic

Dimensions
- Wheelbase: 119.0 in (3,023 mm) (1961); 120.0 in (3,048 mm) (1962–64)
- Length: 210 in (5,334 mm)
- Width: 78.2 in (1,986 mm)

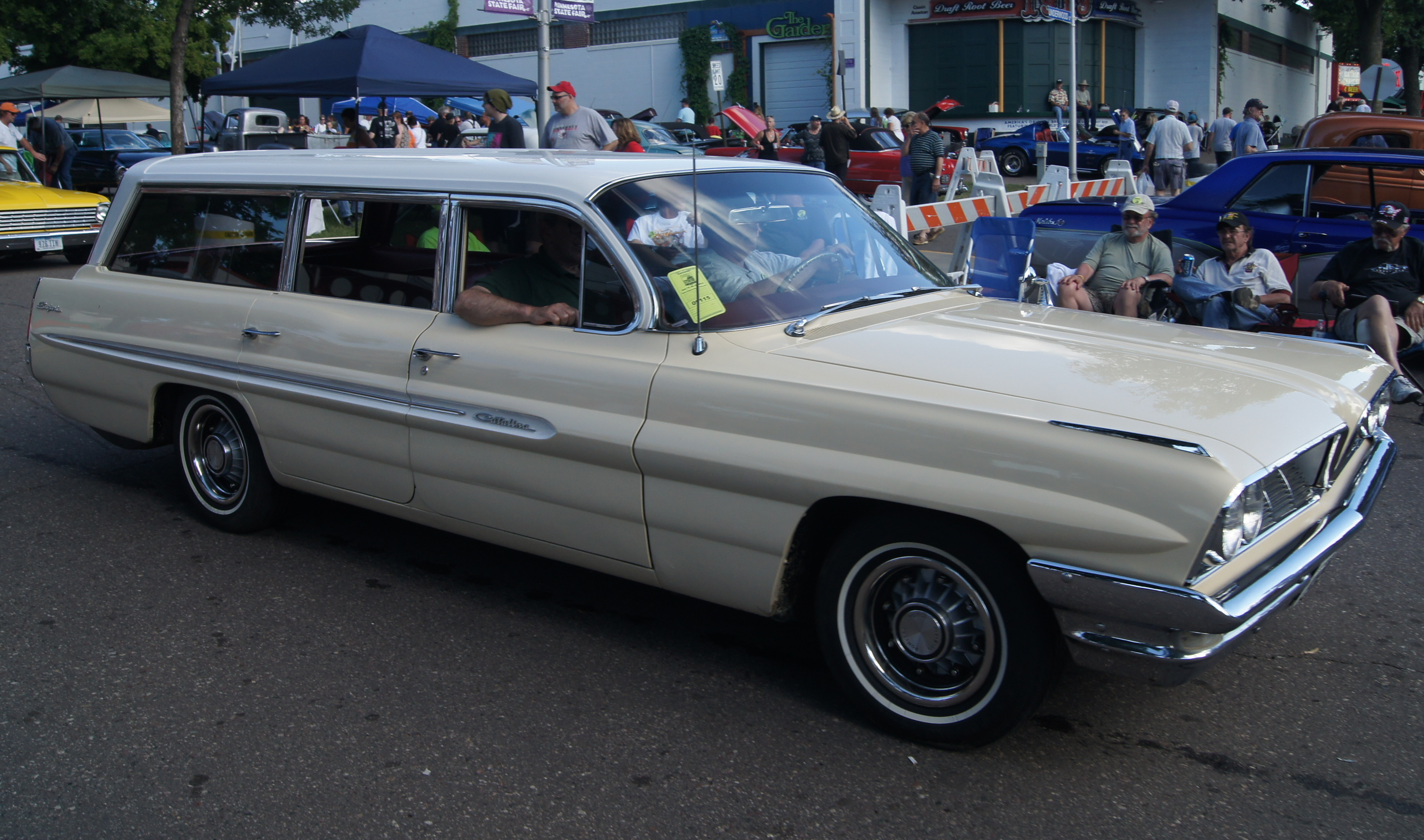
1961 Pontiac Catalina Safari

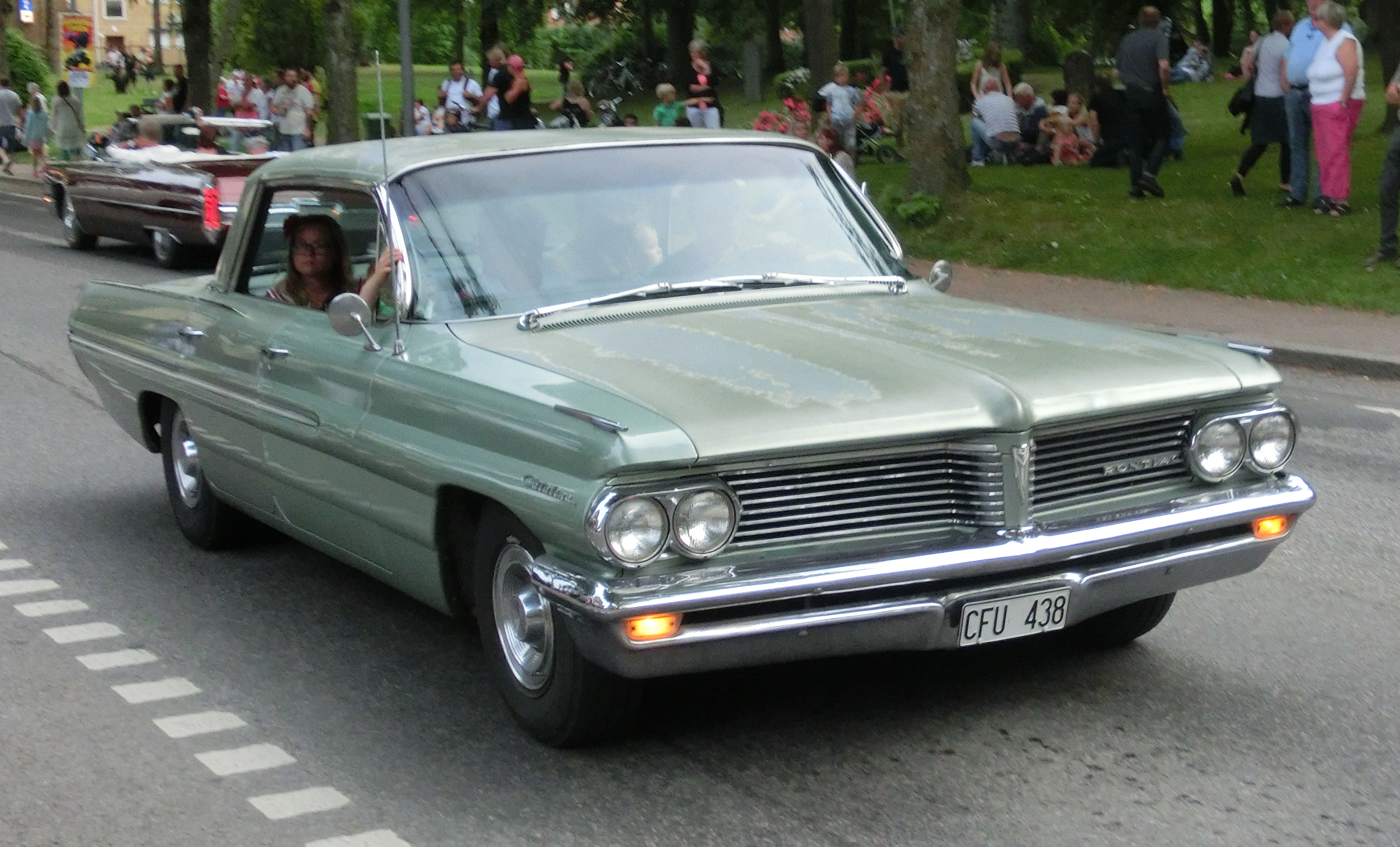
1962 Pontiac Catalina Vista

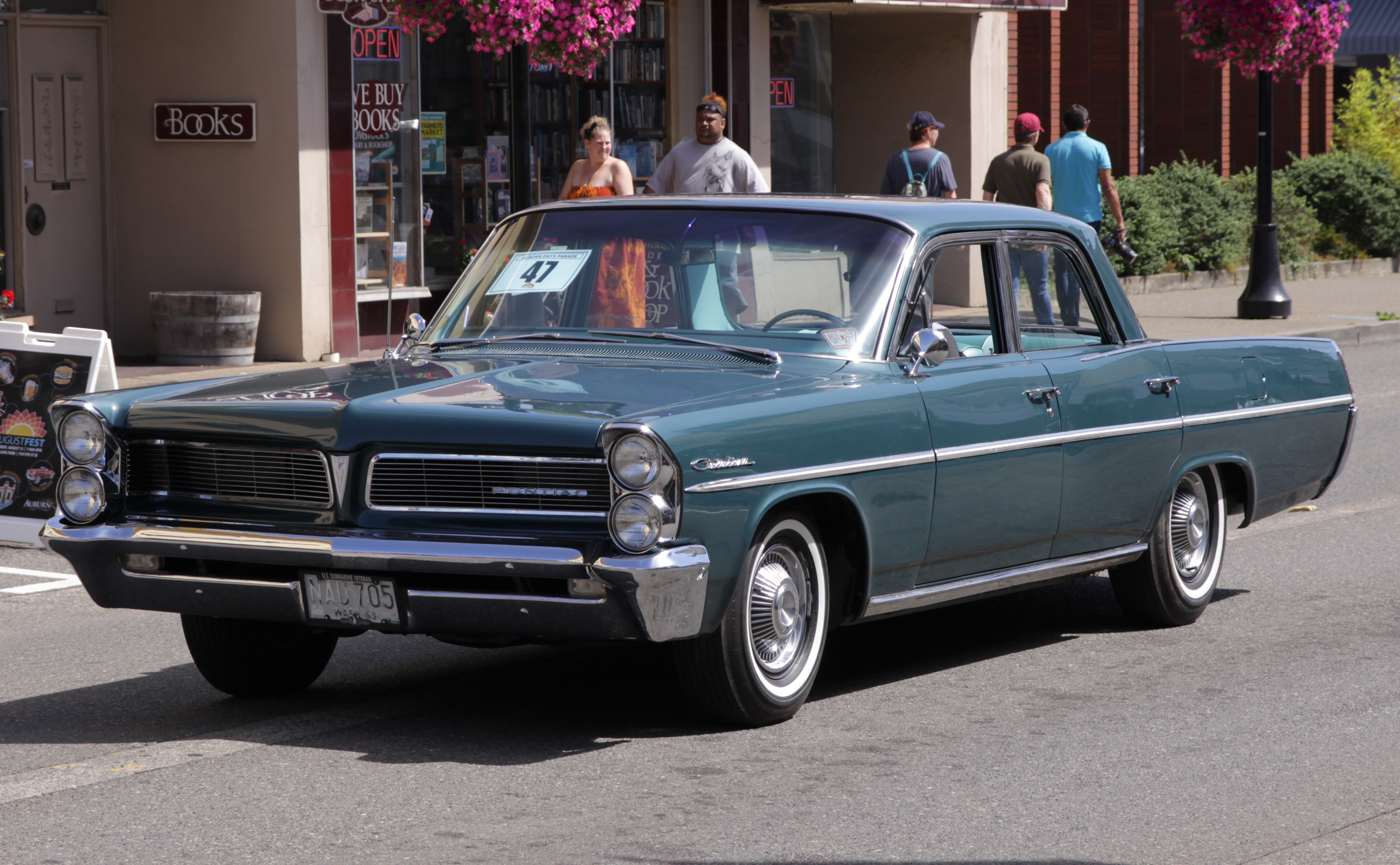
1963 Pontiac Catalina 4-door Sedan

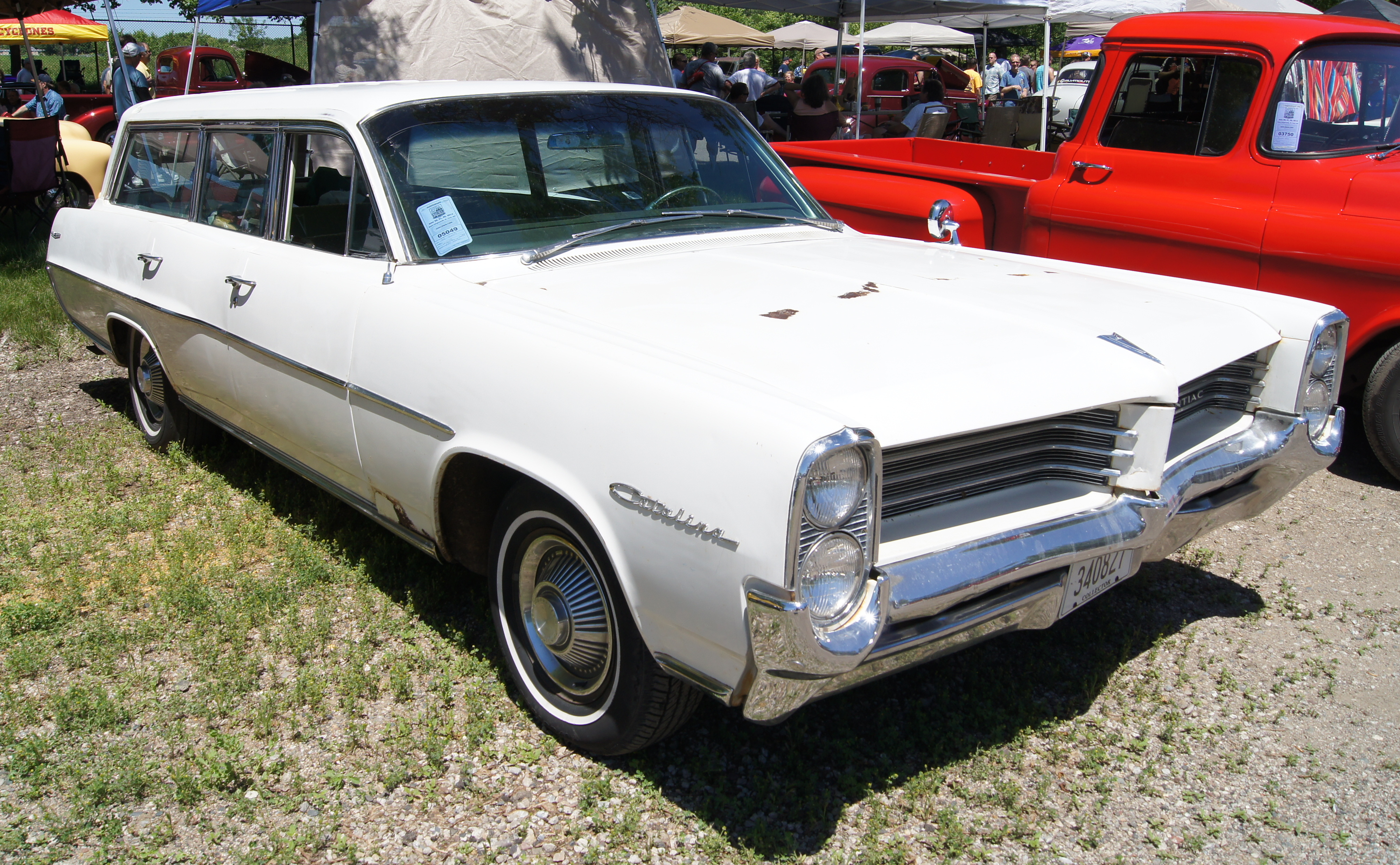
1964 Pontiac Catalina Safari

The 1961 full-sized Pontiacs were completely restyled with more squared-off bodylines, the reintroduction of the split grille first seen in 1959 and dropped for 1960 and an all-new Torque-Box perimeter frame with side rails replacing the "X" frame chassis used since 1958. The new frame not only provides greater side-impact protection than the "X" design but also improves interior roominess.

The distinctive protruding grille made its appearance on all Pontiac products during the early 1960s, and was a modern revival of a similar appearance on Pontiac products during the 1930s and early 1940s, as demonstrated on the Pontiac Torpedo.

Rooflines are more squared off on four-door models, with the six-window styling dropped on pillared sedans and wider C-pillars with flat rear windows on four-door hardtops. A revised version of the 1959-60 "bubbletop" roof was used on two-door hardtops. Wrap-around windshields were dropped in favor of flatter glasswork for improved entry and exit to the front seat.

The new body is somewhat smaller and lighter than the 1960 model with the wheelbase down three inches (76 mm) to 119, overall length reduced by the same to 210 in (5,300 mm) and width dropping nearly two inches to 78.2 from 80 in (2,032.0 mm) 1960. The front and rear track of the 1961-62 Pontiac was reduced to 62.5 in (1,590 mm) front and rear. The 1961 Pontiac was advertised as "all Pontiac...on a new wide track."

All engines were again 389 cu in (6.4 L) V8s as in previous years, now called "Trophy" engines. rather than "Tempest" (including the larger 421ci "big bore" engine). Standard engines are two-barrel units rated at 215 hp (160 kW) with the three-speed manual transmission or 267 hp (199 kW) with the optional Hydramatic, with a 230 hp (172 kW) regular-fuel-capable "economy" V8 offered as a no-cost option with the Hydramatic. Offered as extra-cost options were more powerful versions of the 389 including a 303 hp (226 kW) version with a four-barrel carburetor or 318 hp (237 kW) Tri-Power option. New to the options list were two higher performance versions of the 389, including a four-barrel 333 hp (248 kW) unit and a 348 hp (260 kW) Tri-Power option, both with higher, 10.75:1, compression ratios. A 363 hp (271 kW) engine was offered to drag racers. Late in the 1961 sales season the 421 cu in (6.9 L) Super Duty was released for sale as a dealer installed engine. The 1961 models never came from the assembly line with the 421ci engine; instead it was a specialty item installed and sold at the discretion of individual dealers.

A new "three-speed four-range" "Roto Hydramatic" automatic transmission replaced the previous four-speed unit for 1961. The new transmission is slimmer and lighter than the older four-speed Hydramatic, which was continued on the larger Star Chief and Bonneville models. Also new for 1961 was a four-speed manual transmission with Hurst floor shifter, available on special order.

The 1962 Pontiacs received a heavy facelift from the 1961 design with more rounded body contours and new rooflines on two-door hardtops featuring convertible-like bows. Catalina sedans and coupes got a 1-inch (25 mm) wheelbase increase to 120", after spending 1961 on a 119-inch (3,000 mm) length shared with full-sized Chevys (Safari wagons retained the 119-inch (3,000 mm) wheelbase through 1964). 1962 also saw the introduction of the Grand Prix, a sporty version of the Catalina hardtop coupe.

Most regular engine and transmission offerings were carried over from 1961 with the 389 cu in (6.4 L) Trophy V8, ranging in power ratings from 215 hp (160 kW) to 348 hp (260 kW). A small number of 1962 Catalinas and other Pontiacs were built with a "non-streetable" 421 cu in (6.9 L) Super Duty V8 with two four-barrel carburetors and 405 hp (302 kW), as a US$2,250 option (when the base Catalina listed at US$2,725), along with various "over the counter" performance options offered by Pontiac including aluminum bumpers and even lighter frames with drilled holes (which were dubbed the "Swiss cheese" frames).

For 1963, Catalinas and other full-sized Pontiacs featured cleaner, squared-off bodylines and vertical headlights flanking the split grille, but retained the same dimensions and basic bodyshell of 1961-62 models except for the rear flanks of the new coke bottle styling and due to this styling the rear track was extended to the 59 and 60 Pontiac's 64" wide track. Engine offerings were revised as the 333 hp (248 kW) and 348 hp (260 kW) versions of the 389 V8 were dropped in favor of "production" versions of the larger 421 cu in (6.9 L) rated at 338 horsepower (252 kW) with four-barrel carburetor, 353 hp (263 kW) with Tri-Power, or a 370 hp (280 kW) "HO" with Tri-Power . The 405 hp (302 kW) Super Duty 421 was still offered to racing teams during the early portion of the model year but discontinued after General Motors ordered Pontiac (and Chevrolet) to "cease and desist" from factory-supported racing efforts in February 1963. New options for 1963 included a tilt steering wheel that could be adjusted to six different positions, AM/FM radio and cruise control.

The 1963 Grand Prix got a brand new body with a unique roofline along with unique front and rear end styling. Although still based on the Catalina, the GP looked much larger, more powerful and more luxurious, sharing its content with the longer Bonneville. It featured "Morrokide" bucket seats and a chrome-trimmed center console with floor shifter for the optional Hydra-Matic or 4-speed manual transmissions.

A 1963 Catalina convertible modified by California hot-rodder Bill Straub was used as a tow vehicle in the NASA M2-F1 program.

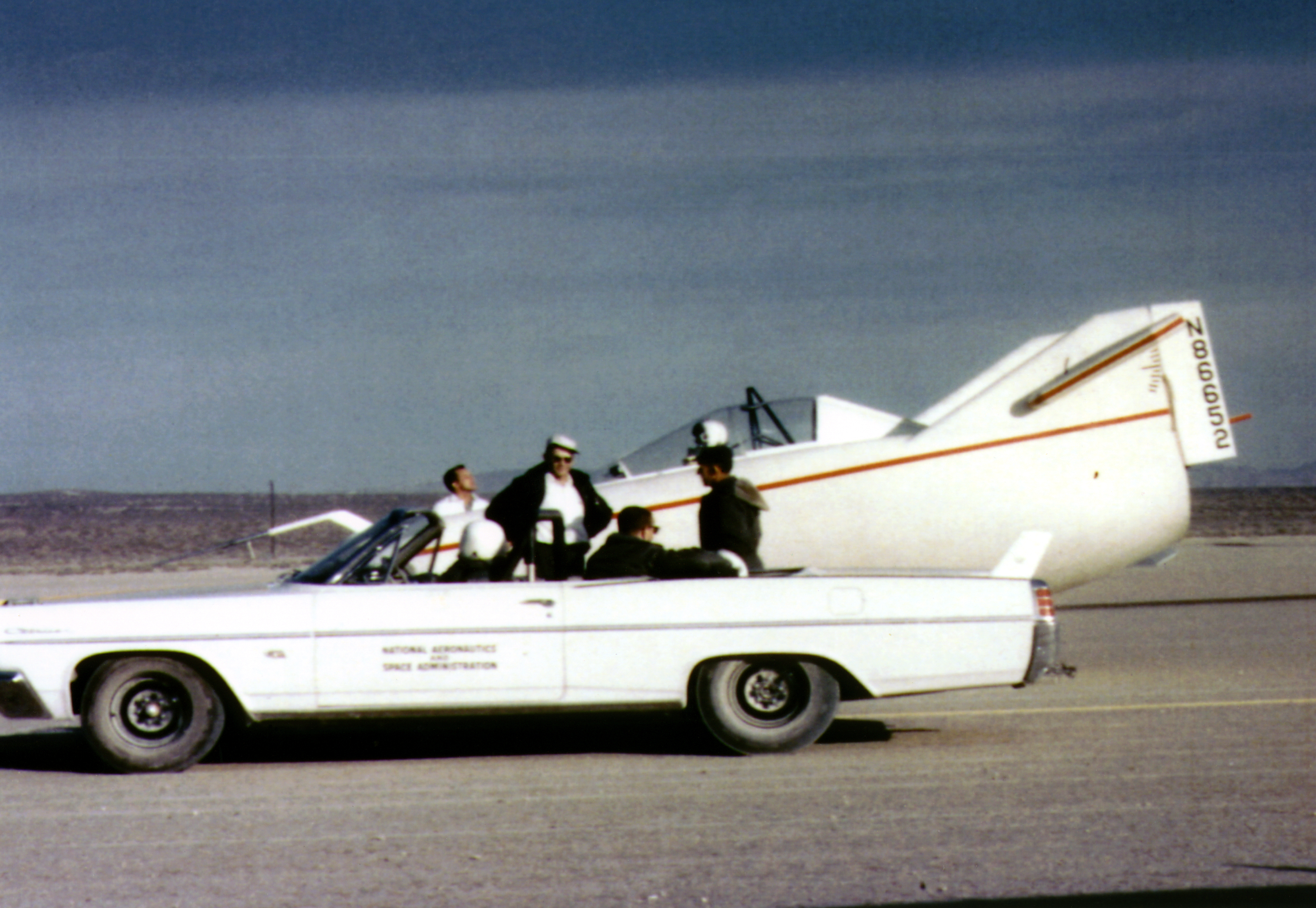
The M2-F1 and its 1963 Catalina convertible tow vehicle

Mild facelifting including new grilles and taillights highlighted the 1964 full-sized Pontiacs. Engine and transmission offerings were unchanged from 1963 except for a new GM-built Muncie four-speed manual replacing the Borg-Warner T-10 unit. Also new for 1964, was the Pontiac 2+2 option package available on Catalina two-door hardtops and convertibles that included bucket seats for both front and rear passengers, heavy-duty suspension and other performance equipment, along with the same selection of 389 cu in (6.4 L) and 421 cu in (6.9 L) V8s found in other Catalinas. The 64 2+2 was a $291 ($3,021 in 2025 dollars) trim option only with the same standard engine as the base Catalina which was listed at $2,869 ($29,783 in 2025 dollars). It was only until 1965 that the 421 engine became the standard engine on the 2+2.

Throughout most of the 1960s when Pontiac annually captured third place in industry sales, behind Chevrolet and Ford, the Catalina was also often the industry's third best-selling full-sized car behind the first-place Chevrolet Impala and second-place Ford Galaxie 500. The Catalina's success in the low-medium priced field led many competitors to respond with similar products such as the 1961 Chrysler Newport, a less-expensive Chrysler that was priced lower than base models bearing the Chrysler nameplate in recent previous years; and the 1962 Dodge Custom 880 and 1963 Mercury Monterey, both of which were introduced as full-fledged low-medium priced full-sized cars in size and power that followed unsuccessful efforts by Mercury and Dodge to bring out downsized full-sized cars.

In 1964, even Pontiac's mid-priced rivals within General Motors responded to the Catalina's success in the marketplace as well as to capture Chevy Impala owners "trading up" to cars from upscale GM divisions. Buick took its lowest-priced big car, the LeSabre, and lowered the base sticker price further by substituting a smaller 300 cu in (4.9 L) V8 engine and two-speed automatic transmission from its intermediate-sized cars in place of the 401 cu in (6.6 L) V8 and three-speed automatic used in other big Buicks. Oldsmobile went even further by creating a whole new full-sized series, the Jetstar 88, which was $75 lower than the Dynamic 88 series (but still a few dollars higher than comparable Pontiac Catalina models) and also got a smaller engine - a 330 cu in (5.4 L) V8 and two-speed automatic transmission from the intermediate F-85/Cutlass line, along with smaller 9.5 in (240 mm) brake drums (also from the GM intermediates) compared to the 11–12 in (280–300 mm) drums still found on all other GM full-sized cars from the bare-bones six-cylinder Chevrolet Biscayne to the Cadillac 75 limousine. And since the Catalina was still priced lower than the Jetstar and LeSabre, the lowest-priced full-sized Pontiac was often perceived by buyers as a better value in the marketplace due to its larger standard V8 engine and three-speed automatic transmission, and (in comparison to the Jetstar 88) bigger brakes.

Pontiac Catalina Production Figures
	Yearly Total
1961	113,354
1962	204,654
1963	234,549
1964	257,768
Total	810,325

=== 1965–1970 ===
Third generation
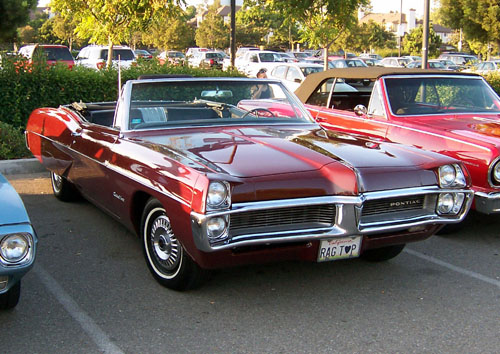
- 1967 Pontiac Catalina Convertible

Overview
- Also called: Pontiac 2+2; Pontiac Ventura
- Model years: 1965–1970
- Assembly: (main plant); Pontiac, Michigan, US (Pontiac Assembly) (branch assembly); Arlington, Texas, US (Arlington Assembly); Doraville, Georgia, US (Doraville Assembly); Kansas City, Kansas, US (Fairfax Assembly); Linden, New Jersey, US (Linden Assembly); Oshawa, Ontario, Canada (Laurentian) (Oshawa Car Assembly); South Gate, California, US (South Gate Assembly); General Motors New Zealand, Petone, New Zealand (Laurentian)

Body and chassis
- Body style: 2-door sedan 2-door coupe 2-door convertible 4-door sedan 4-door hardtop 4-door station wagon
- Related: Chevrolet Impala; Oldsmobile 88; Buick LeSabre

Powertrain
- Engine: 350 cu in (5.7 L) V8; 389 cu in (6.4 L) V8; 400 cu in (6.6 L) V8; 421 cu in (6.9 L) V8; 428 cu in (7.0 L) V8; 455 cu in (7.5 L) V8
- Transmission: 3-speed manual 2-speed Super Turbine 300 automatic 3-speed THM 400 automatic

Dimensions
- Wheelbase: 1965–68: 121 in (3,073 mm); 1969–70: 122 in (3,099 mm)
- Length: 214.6 in (5,451 mm)

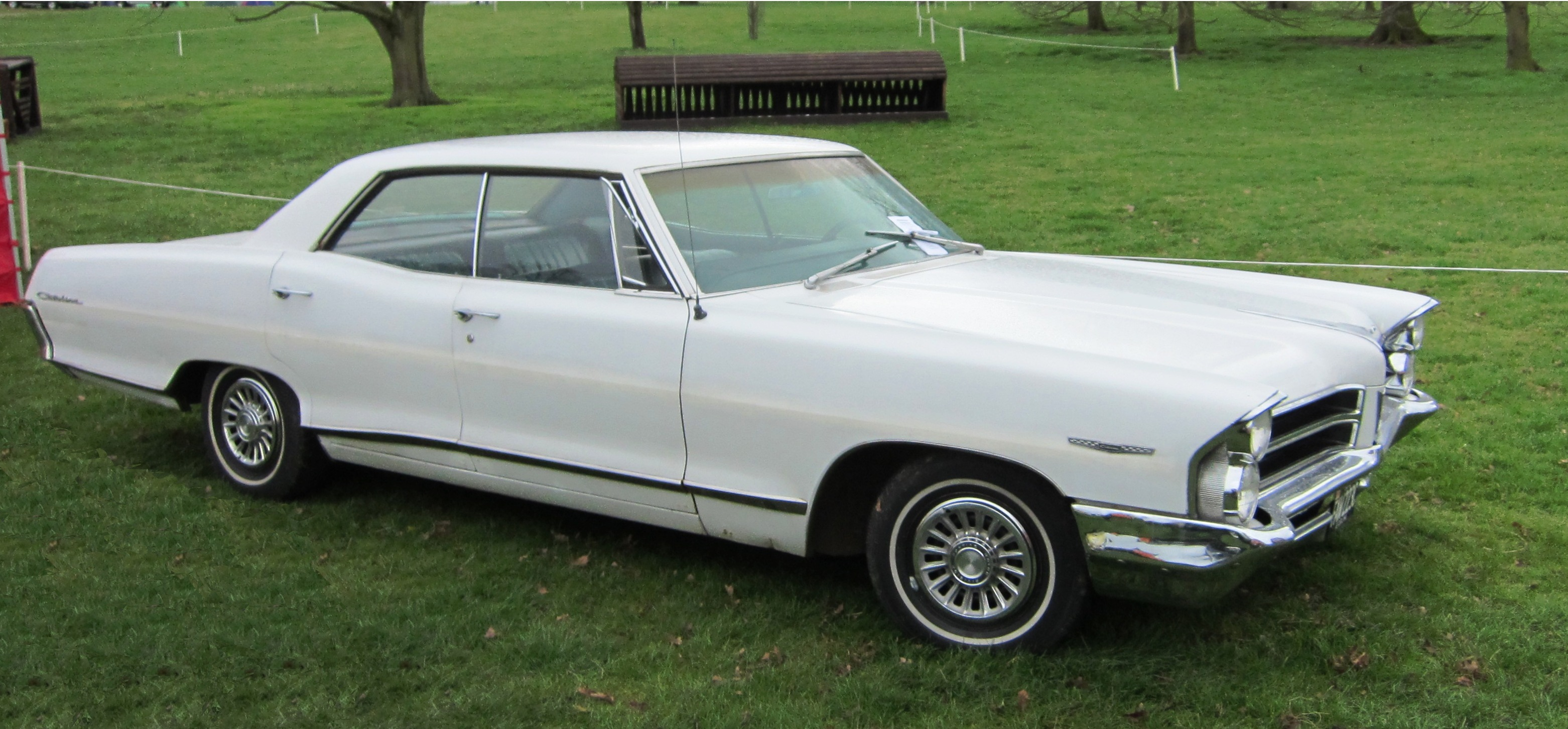
1965 Pontiac Catalina 4-door Vista

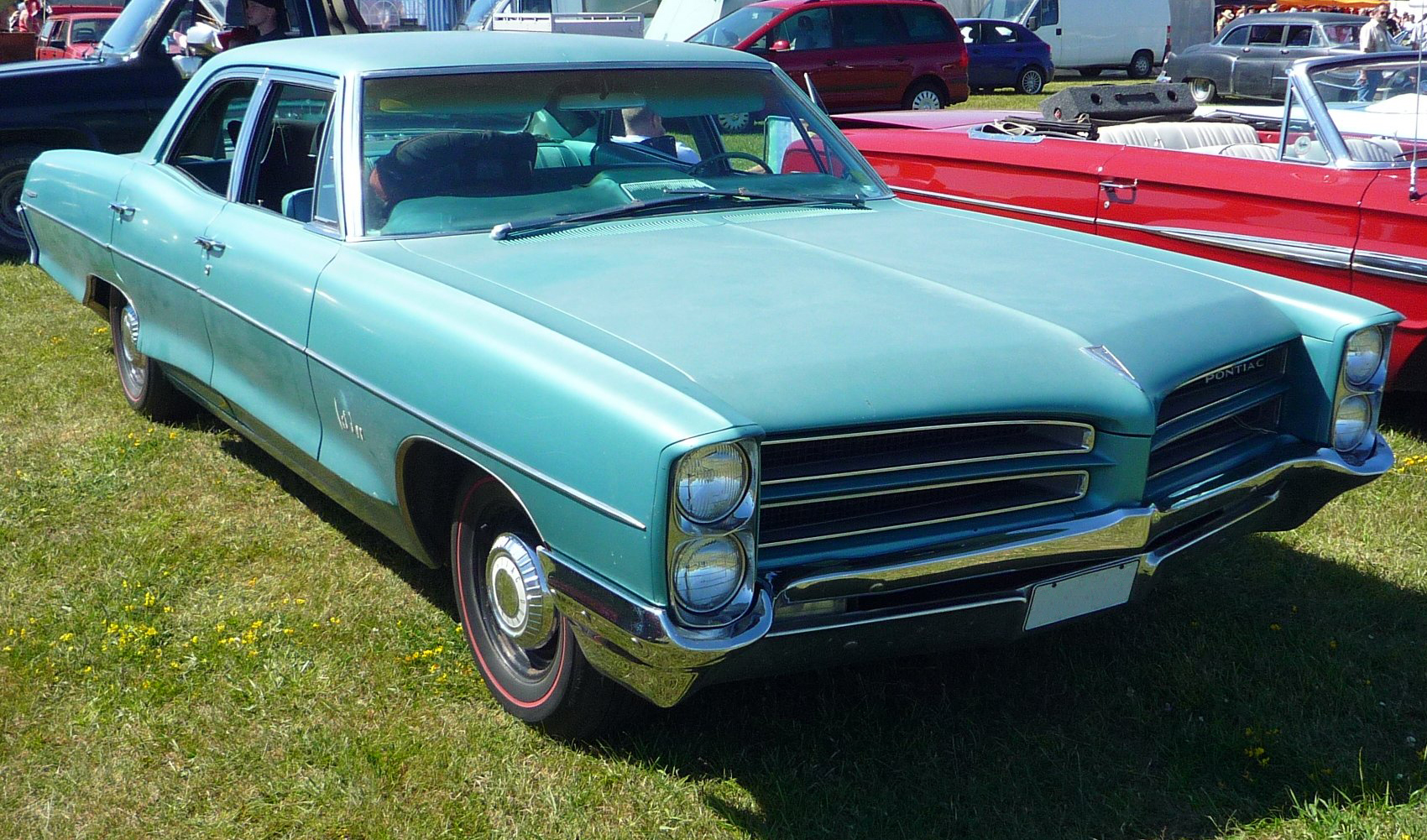
1966 Pontiac Catalina 4-door Sedan

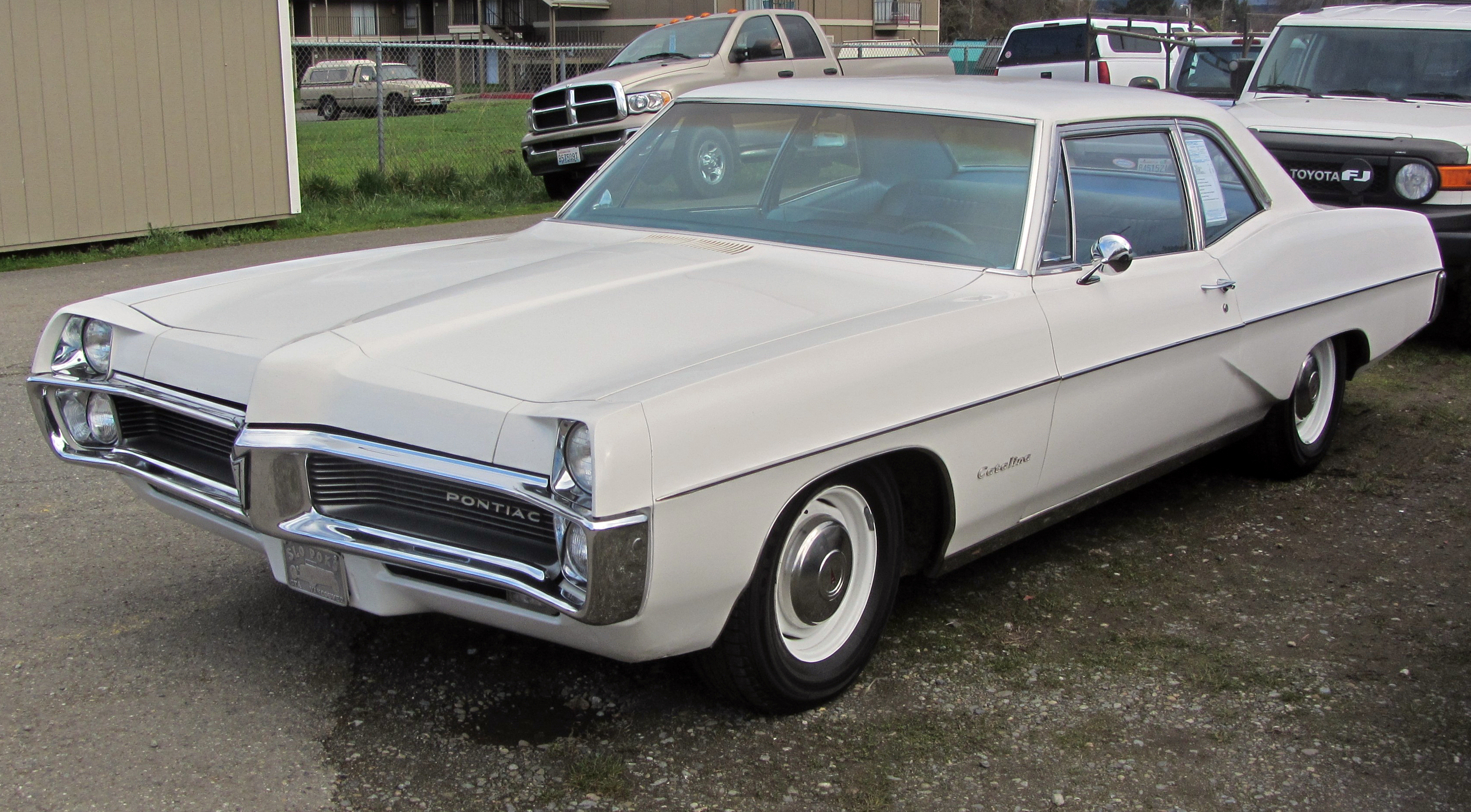
1967 Pontiac Catalina 2-door Sedan

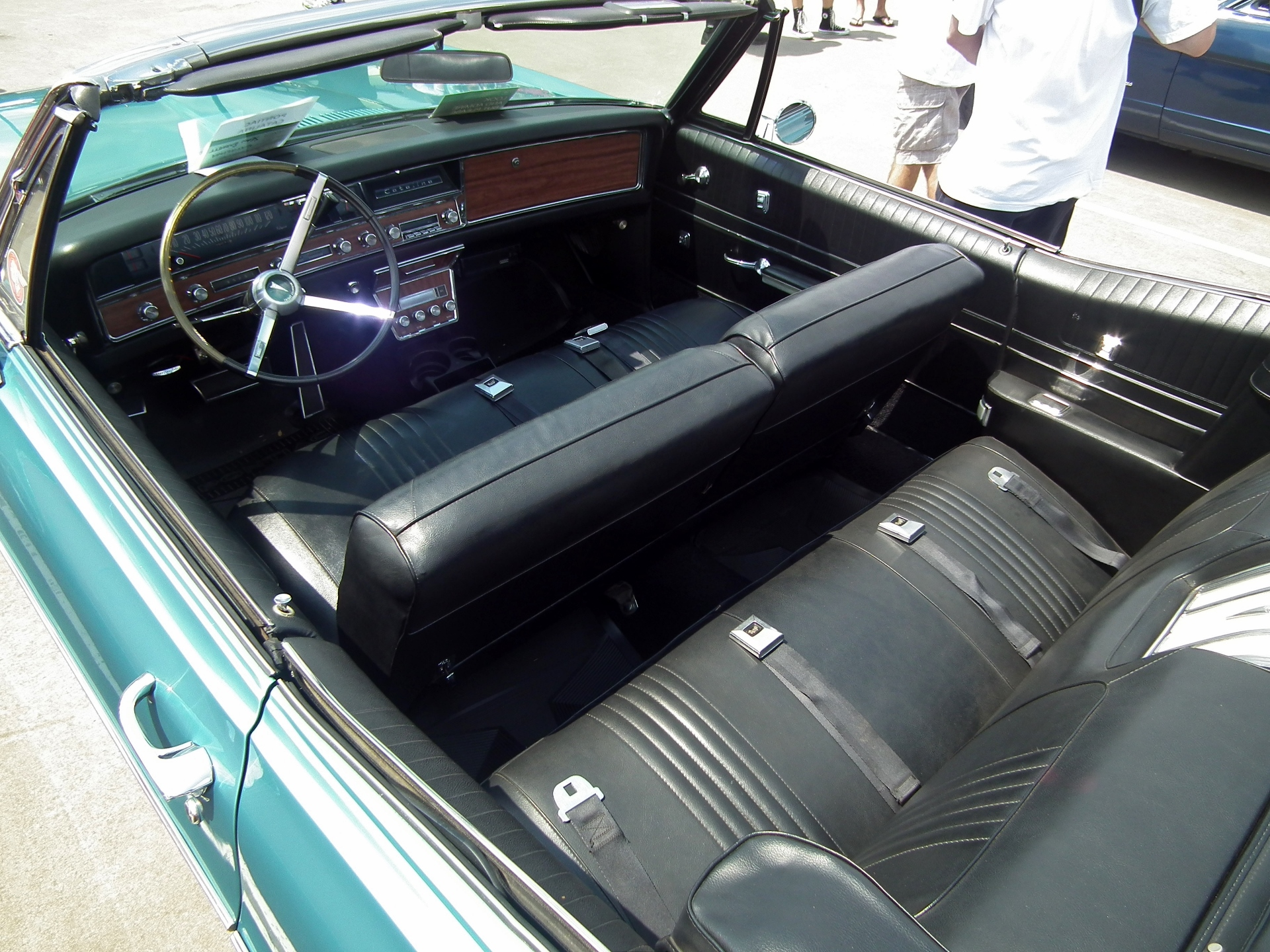
1967 Pontiac Catalina convertible interior

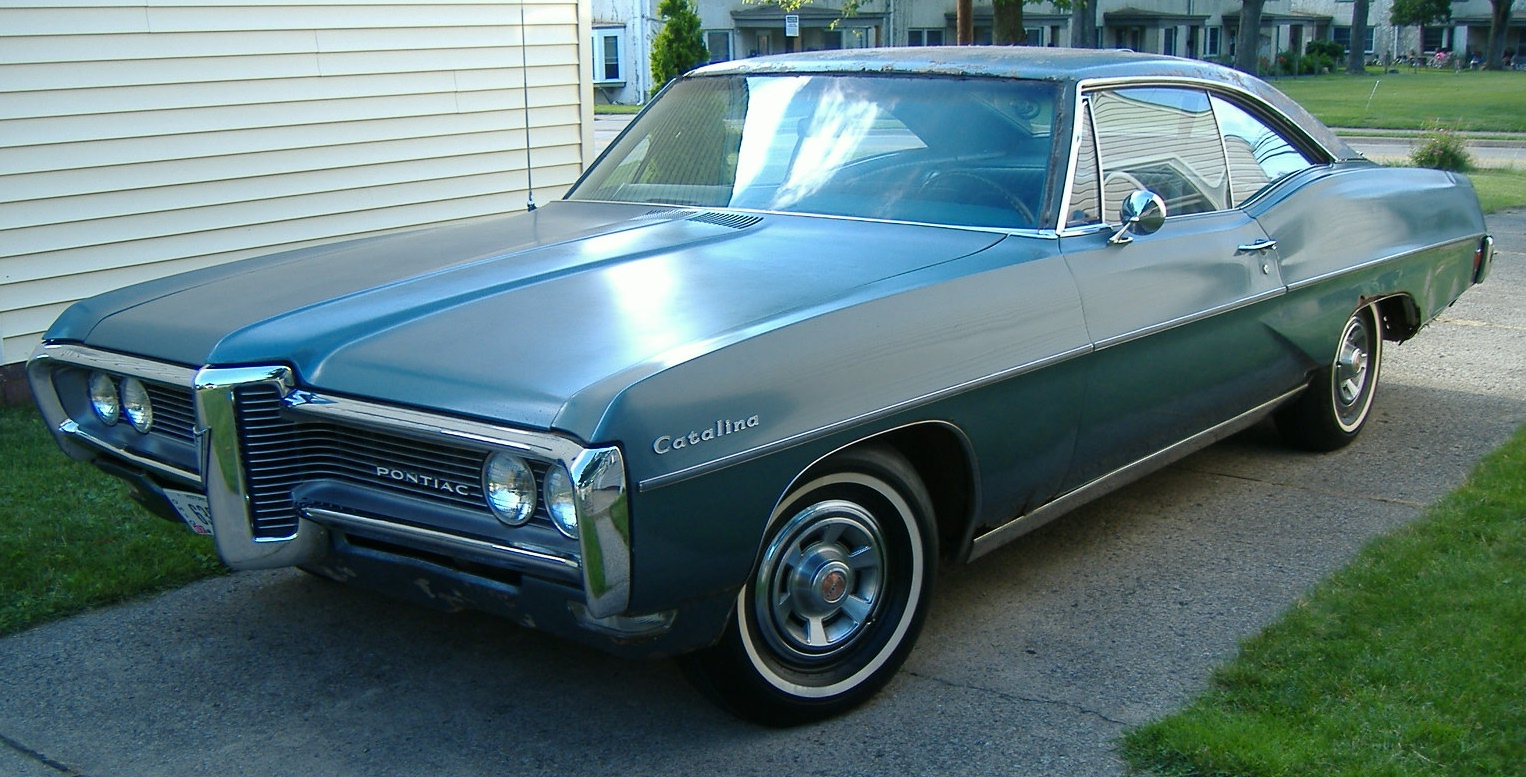
1968 Pontiac Catalina Hardtop Coupe

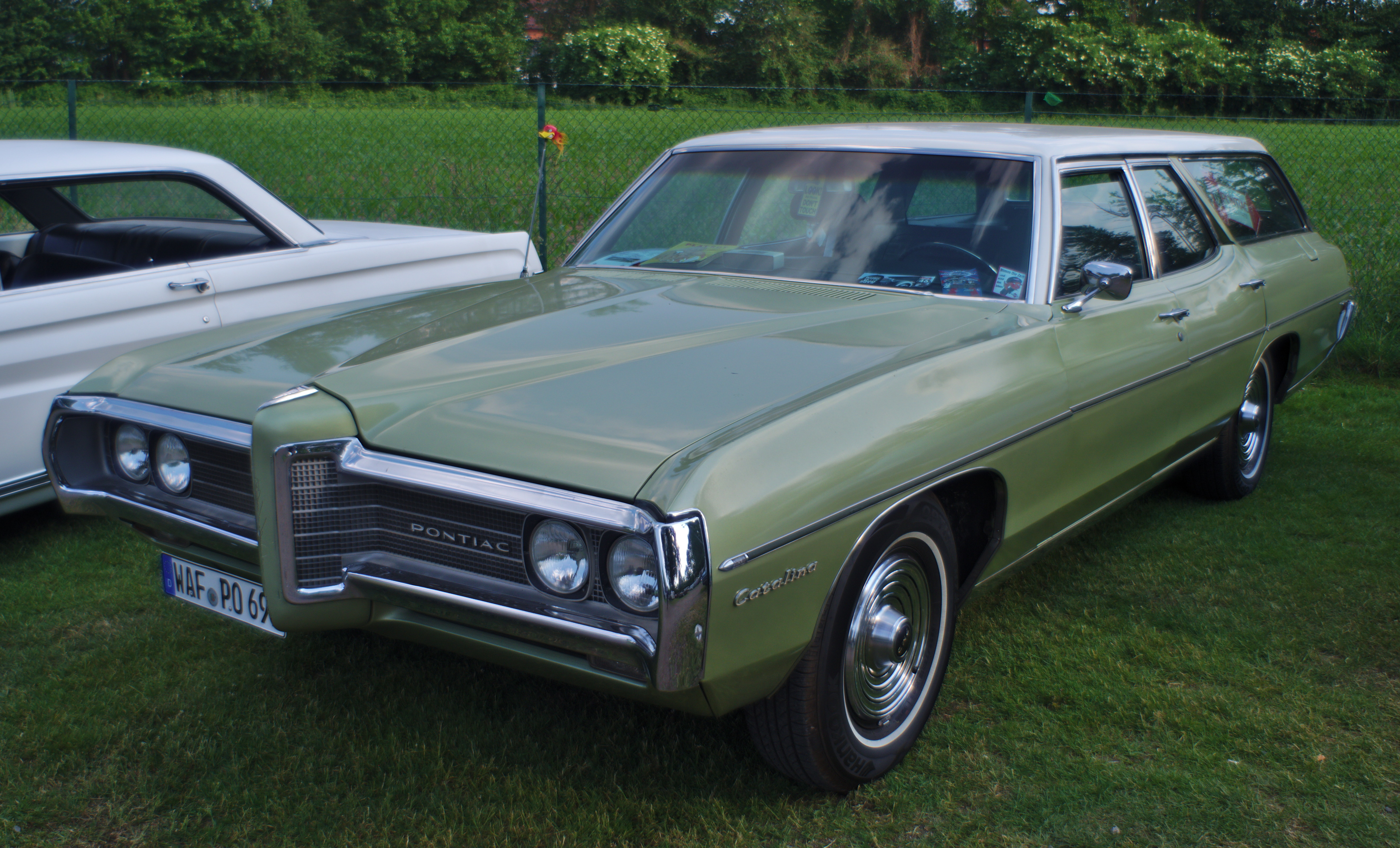
1969 Pontiac Catalina wagon

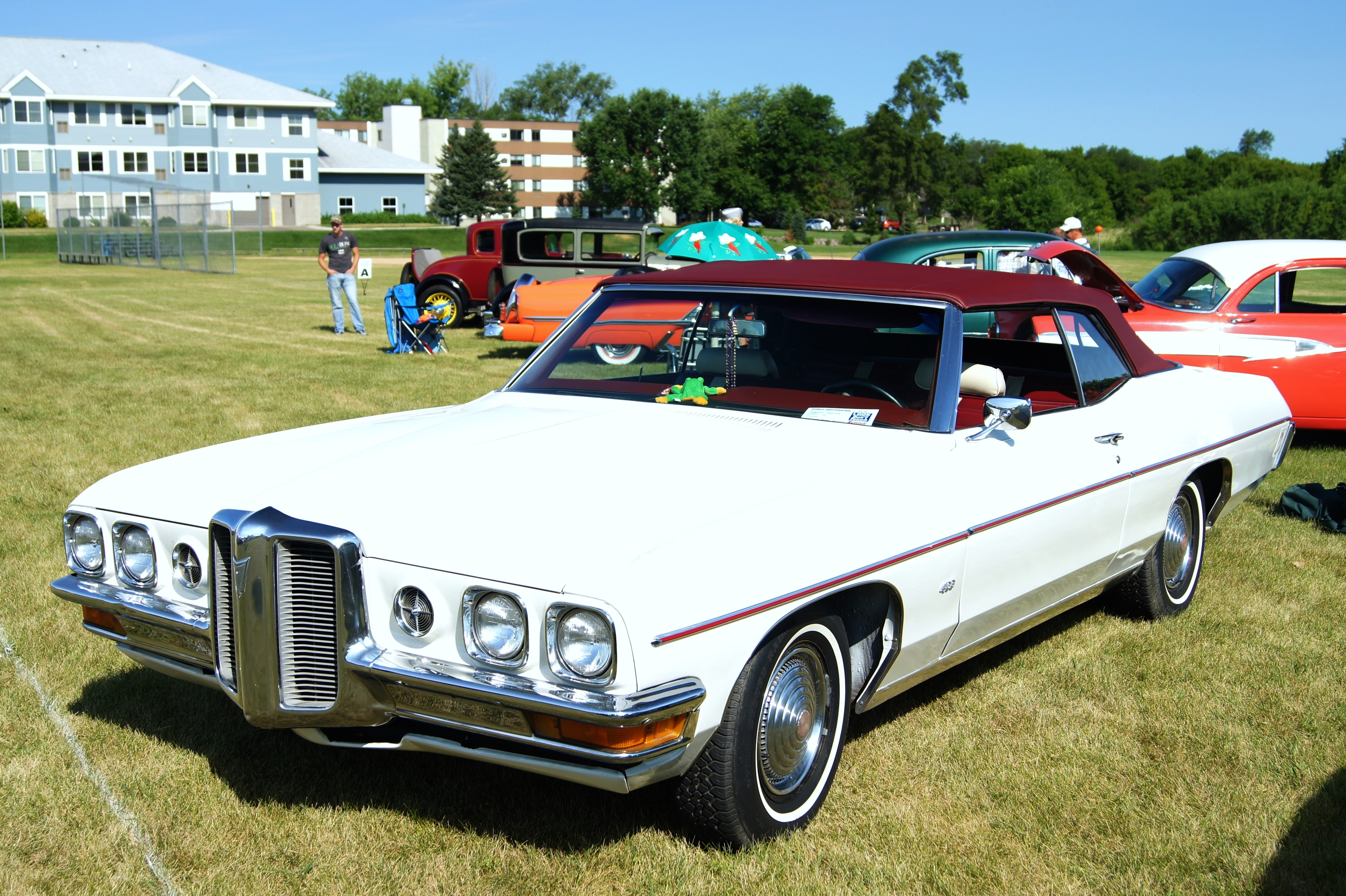
1970 Pontiac Catalina Convertible

The 1965 full-sized Pontiacs were completely restyled with more flowing sheetmetal featuring "Coke-bottle" profiles and fastback rooflines on two-door hardtops. Wheelbases increased to 121 inches (3,100 mm) on all models.

Pontiacs for the 1965 were now available with GM's new-for-1964 three-speed Turbo Hydramatic 400 transmission, often abbreviated as THM-400. This new unit replaced the older three-speed, four-range Roto-Hydramatic in the Catalina, as well as the four-speed Super-Hydramatic that was equipped in other Pontiacs. The THM-400 is torque converter based, similar in design to the Chrysler Torqueflite and Ford Cruise-O-Matic transmissions. Despite the Turbo Hydramatic 400 still bearing the "Hydramatic" name, it shared no design components with either of the older fluid-coupling based Roto or Super-Hydramatics. This new transmission was a large, but welcome, departure from the older transmissions, which were not as durable, smooth or fast as the new unit. The THM-400 also changed the shift pattern from the "P-N-D-S-L-R" to the safer and ultimately more modern "P-R-N-D-S-L." Although this transmission was new for 1964, it did lack some of the functionality of the older transmissions, like the low first gear ratios (3.50:1 or 3.97:1 for the Roto and Super Hydramatics respectively) or the split torque design where only 40% of the power went through the inefficient fluid couplings, which helped improve economy.

The 389 and 421 cubic-inch V8s received a number of revisions including thinner wall block castings. The standard engine for Catalina models is the 389 two-barrel rated at 256 hp (191 kW) with base three-speed manual transmission and 8.6 to 1 compression or 290 hp (216 kW) with Turbo Hydramatic transmission and higher 10.5 to 1 compression. An economy regular-fuel 265 hp (198 kW) version of the 389 two-barrel with 8.6 to 1 compression ratio that burned regular gas was available as a no-cost option with Turbo Hydramatic. Optional engines include a four-barrel 389 rated at 325 hp (242 kW) with Turbo Hydramatic or 333 with stick shift, a Tri-Power 389 rated at 338 hp (252 kW), a four-barrel 421 rated at the same 338 hp (252 kW), 353 hp with Tri-Power or the 421 HO with Tri-Power and 376 hp (280 kW).

The 2+2 option changed from a trim package to an all-out performance car package for 1965 similar to Pontiac's intermediate-sized GTO. The base engine with the 2+2 was now the 338-horsepower 421 four-barrel with the 353 hp (263 kW) Tri-Power or 376-horsepower 421 HO with Tri-Power available as options.

The 1966 full-sized Pontiacs received a minor facelift of the '65 body with new grilles and taillight treatment. Inside, the instrument panel was revised along with interior trim. The 2+2 was upgraded from an option to full model status and engine-transmission offerings on all Catalina models remained the same as 1965 with the exception being the elimination of the 338-horsepower 389 Tri-Power option.

For 1967, Catalinas and other full-sized Pontiacs received a heavy facelift of the '65 bodyshell with more rounded wasp-waisted body contours and fuller fastback rooflines, along with concealed windshield wipers - an industry first. Replacing the 389 and 421 V8s of previous years were new 400 and 428 cubic-inch V8s with bigger valves and a valve angle change built off the same Pontiac V8 design in use since 1955. The valve angle change was so bigger valves and larger ports could be used. The standard Catalina engine was a two-barrel unit rated at 265 hp (198 kW) with three-speed manual transmission or 290 hp (216 kW) with Turbo Hydramatic. The 265 hp (198 kW) engine was available as a no-cost option with the Turbo Hydramatic and differed from the standard 290 hp (216 kW) unit by using regular gas as opposed to premium fuel. Optional engines included a four-barrel 400 rated at 325 hp (242 kW), a four-barrel 428 rated at 360 hp (268 kW) or the four-barrel 428 HO rated at 376 hp (280 kW). The Tri-Power engine options were dropped for 1967 thanks to a new GM corporate policy headed primarily by Ed Cole which prohibited the use of multiple carbs on all vehicles except the Chevrolet Corvette and the Corvair, two of Cole's babies when he was head of Chevrolet Engineering and later Chevrolet General Manager. Front disc brakes and a stereo eight-track tape player were new additions to the option list.

The 2+2 was offered for the last time in 1967 in both hardtop coupe and convertible. The 360-horsepower 428 was standard and the 428 HO was optional. This model was dropped due to low sales since its 1964 introduction as performance car buyers overwhelmingly preferred smaller and lighter intermediates such as Pontiac's own GTO and the new Firebird pony car, which was introduced for 1967.

Safety came to the fore in 1967, and the Catalina featured all the new US Government-mandated safety equipment including an energy-absorbing steering column, safety steering wheel, dual-circuit hydraulic brake system, and soft interior parts.

For 1968, Catalinas and other full-sized Pontiacs received a minor facelifting of the '67 body with a new beak-nose split grille along with a reverting to horizontal headlights, and revised taillights. Engine offerings were similar to 1967 with revised horsepower ratings including 340 for the four-barrel 400, 375 for the 428 four-barrel and 390 for the 428 HO. Safety continued to be key in 1968 with new fender side-marker lights becoming standard. Cars built after January 1, 1968, included front outboard shoulder belts as standard equipment.

The 1969 Pontiacs received a major restyling with somewhat more squared off sheetmetal (though not as much as similar cars from other GM divisions) and rooflines, the coke bottle rear flanks were gone. However, the basic 1965 chassis, inner-body structure and four-door pillared sedan roofline were retained although vent windows were dropped on all models and Safari wagons got a new two-way tailgate that could be opened to the side like a door or downward like a tailgate – similar in design to that introduced by Ford Motor Company on Ford/Mercury wagons in 1966. Catalinas also got a one-inch wheelbase increase to 122. Headrests became standard on all '69 Pontiacs built after January 1. All 1969 GM cars (except the Corvair) got a new locking steering column that would become a Federal requirement starting with the 1970 models.

Variable-ratio power steering was a new option this year (pioneered by Cadillac in 1966) and front disc brakes were now automatically included when the power brake option was ordered.

Engine offerings consisted of a standard 290 hp (216 kW) 400 two-barrel (or no-cost optional regular-fuel 265 hp (198 kW) 400 with Turbo Hydramatic transmission), 330 hp (246 kW) 400 four-barrel, 370 hp (276 kW) 428 four-barrel or the 428 HO rated at 390 hp (291 kW). The standard three-speed manual transmission and optional three-speed Turbo Hydramatic were continued as before, but the four-speed manual with Hurst shifter was dropped from the option list.

All full-sized Pontiacs, including Catalinas, received a new Grand Prix-like V-nose grille for 1970 along with 'horns ports' on a facelifted front end and new taillights mounted in the rear bumper. Catalina sedans and coupes now came standard with a smaller 255 hp (190 kW) 350 cubic-inch Pontiac V8 as standard equipment with optional engines including the previously standard 400 two-barrel rated at 265 hp (198 kW) and 290 hp (216 kW) (still standard on convertibles and Safari wagons), a 330 hp (246 kW) 400 four-barrel and a two versions of the new 455 cubic-inch V8 rated at 360 hp (268 kW) or 370 hp (276 kW) with the "HO" option. As in past years, a three-speed manual transmission with column shift was standard equipment, but most cars were equipped with the optional three-speed Turbo Hydramatic. Also offered for 1970, but seldom ordered, was a two-speed automatic transmission, Turbo Hydramatic 300 that was available with the 350 V8.

The 1965–70 GM B platform is the fourth best selling automobile platform in history after the Volkswagen Beetle, Ford Model T, and the Lada Riva.

Pontiac Catalina Production Figures
	Yearly Total
1965	271,058
1966	247,927
1967	211,405
1968	240,971
1969	212,851
1970	193,986
Total	1,378,198

=== 1971–1976 ===
Fourth generation
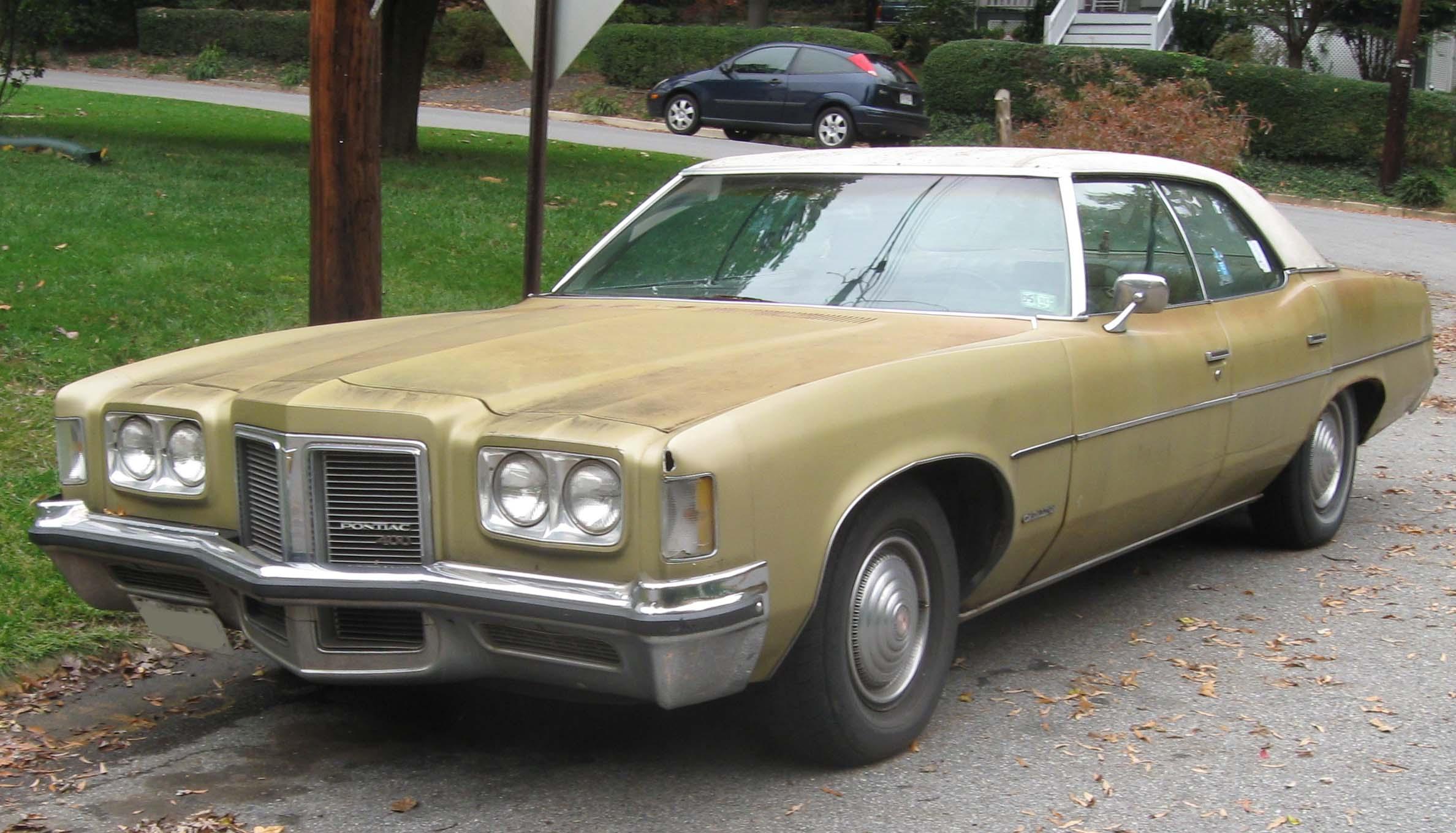
- 1972 Pontiac Catalina 4-door Hardtop

Overview
- Production: 1971–1976
- Assembly: (main plant); Pontiac, Michigan, US (Pontiac Assembly) (branch assembly); Doraville, Georgia, US (Doraville Assembly); Kansas City, Kansas, US (Fairfax Assembly); South Gate, California, US (South Gate Assembly); Oshawa, Ontario, Canada (Laurentian) (Oshawa Car Assembly)

Body and chassis
- Body style: 4-door sedan 4-door hardtop 2-door hardtop 2-door convertible 4-door station wagon
- Related: Chevrolet Impala; Oldsmobile 88; Buick LeSabre

Powertrain
- Engine: 350 cu in (5.7 L) "350" V8; 400 cu in (6.6 L) V8; 455 cu in (7.5 L) V8
- Transmission: 3-speed THM400 automatic

Dimensions
- Wheelbase: 123.5 in (3,137 mm) (1971-72); 124 in (3,150 mm) (1973-74); 123.4 in (3,134 mm) (1975-76)

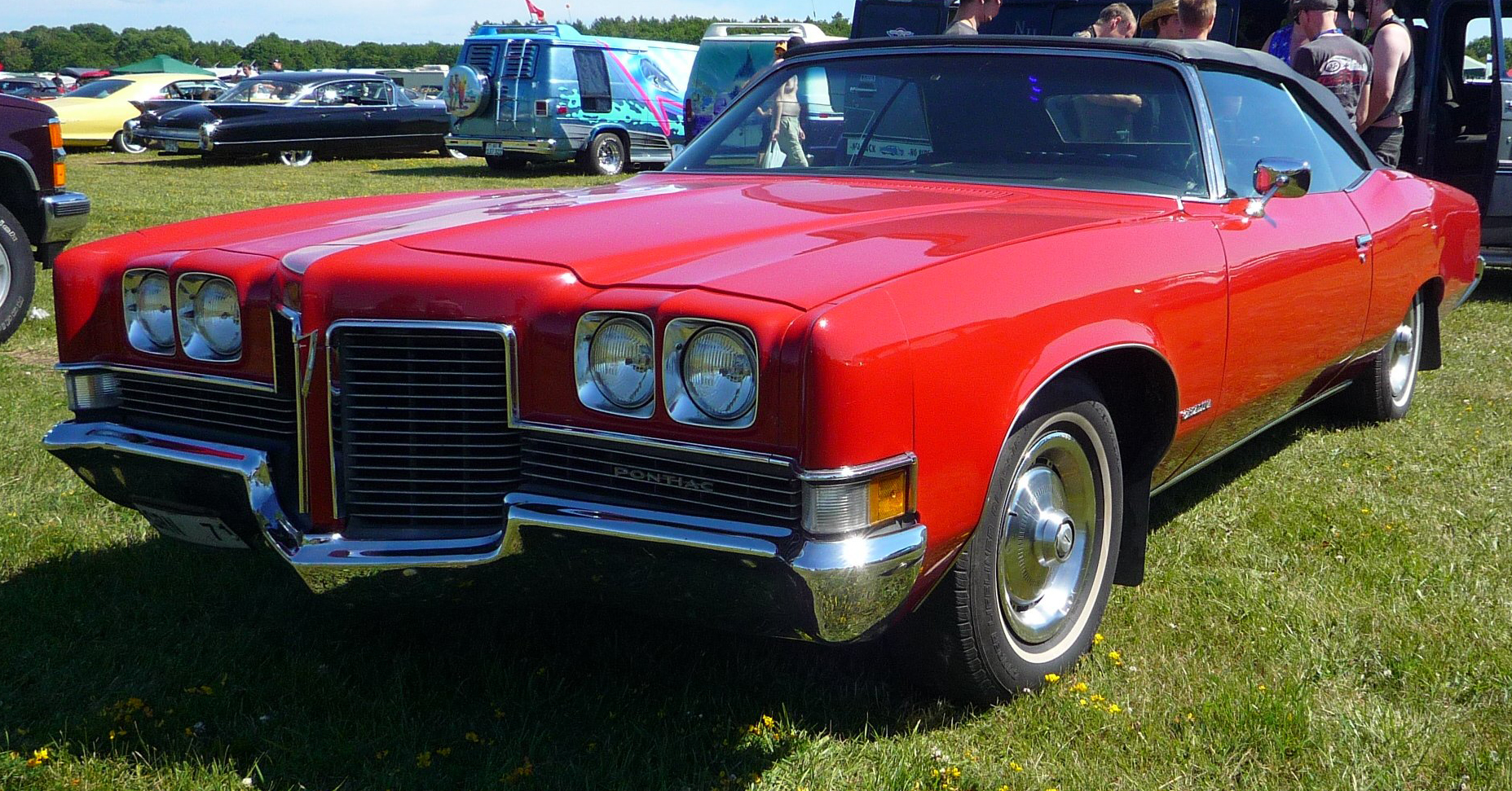
1971 Pontiac Catalina convertible

For 1971, Catalina and other full-sized Pontiacs were completely redesigned and restyled from the wheels up with long hood/short deck proportions and fuselage styling somewhat similar to Chrysler Corporation's 1969 full-sized cars, along with a double shell roof for improved roll-over protection and flush pull-up exterior door handles - the latter two features first seen on the 1970 1/2 Firebird. Catalina and Catalina Brougham sedans and coupes rode on a 123.5 in (3,137 mm) wheelbase while Bonneville and Grand Ville used a longer 126 in (3,200 mm) wheelbase, and Safari wagons were an inch longer at 127 in (3,226 mm). Station wagons also got their own multi-leaf spring rear suspensions, while sedans and coupes continued to be suspended with front and rear coil springs. The graceful two-door hardtop roofline was shared with the Chevrolet Impala Sport Coupe, and hardtop coupes in full size Oldsmobiles and Buicks using the GM "B" body.

New for 1971 was the Catalina Brougham series, which offered a more luxurious interior trim than the regular Catalina, available as a two-door hardtop, four-door hardtop and four-door pillared sedan. It was similar in concept to the Ventura series (1960-1961, 1966–1969) and the Ventura Custom trim option on the Catalina (1962-1965, 1970). It was dropped in 1973 after its sales failed to meet expectations. 1972 was also the Catalina convertible's final year.

The Catalina Safari wagon became simply the Pontiac Safari for 1971 (though it continued to share interior and exterior trimmings with Catalina sedans and coupes) while the more luxurious Executive and Bonneville wagons were replaced by the new Grand Safari wagon. While the Grand Safari shared its grille design with the new Grand Ville series, its interior trim was identical to the optional vinyl interior offered on the Bonneville series. Pontiac now grouped its full-sized wagons as a separate series from their sedan counterparts, as did Chevrolet (Brookwood, Townsman, Kingswood, Kingswood Estate), Oldsmobile (Custom Cruiser), and Buick (Estate Wagon).

As did all GM B-Body wagons, the Safari and Grand Safari received GM's new clamshell tailgate. Operated by switches on the instrument panel or a key switch on the rear quarter panel, the tailgate slid into a recess under the cargo floor while the electric window slid upward into the rear roof section. Pontiac boasted the new system made it easier to load and unload the wagon in tight spaces, but the "Glide-Away" tailgate was prone to electrical and mechanical problems, and water and air leakage problems, as the cars aged.

Another trouble-prone feature Pontiacs shared with all GM B- and C-body cars for 1971 was a new power ventilation system. The system, also shared with the Vega, used the heater fan to draw air into the car from the cowl intake at the base of the windshield, and force it out through vents in the trunk lid or tailgate. In theory, passengers could enjoy fresh air even when the car was moving slowly or stopped, as in heavy traffic. In practice, however, it didn't work.

Within weeks of the 1971 models' debut, however, Pontiac—and all other GM dealers—received multiple complaints from drivers who complained the ventilation system pulled cold air into the car before the heater could warm up—and could not be shut off. The ventilation system was extensively revised for 1972.

All models featured new Grand Prix-style wrap-around cockpit instrument panels that placed controls and instruments within easy reach of the driver along with two round pods for a speedometer and the other for warning lights, fuel gauge or optional gauges and electric clock. Interior trims were available in cloth and Morrokide vinyl or expanded Morrokide depending on model.

Standard engine in Catalina sedans and coupes was a 255-horsepower "350" (actually 355 cid) V8 with two-barrel carburetor. Catalina Brougham models and Safari wagons came standard with a 400 cubic-inch V8 with two-barrel carburetor rated at 265 gross horsepower that was optional on other Catalina models. Optional engines included a 455 cubic-inch V8 with two- or four-barrel carburetion and respective horsepower ratings of 285 and 325, respectively. All Pontiac engines for 1971 were designed to run on lower-octane regular leaded, low lead or unleaded gasoline thanks to a GM corporate edict, necessitating reductions in compression ratios.

Power front disc brakes were made standard equipment for the first time in 1971. As in previous years, variable ratio power steering and Turbo Hydramatic transmission were extra-cost options but became standard equipment midway through the 1971 model run. Also available on early 1971 Catalinas with the 350 engine was a two-speed automatic transmission in addition to the standard column-shift three-speed manual.

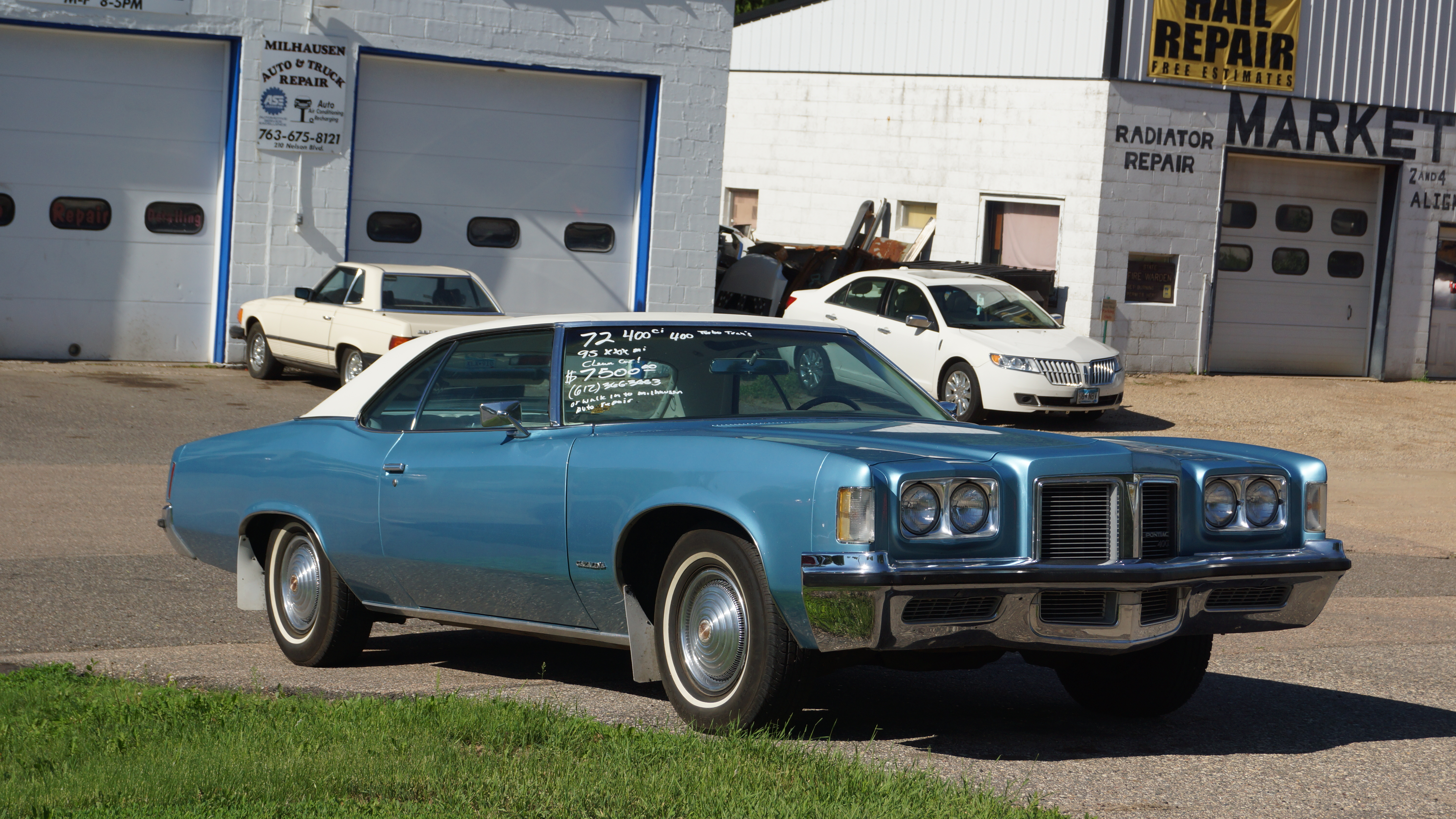
1972 Pontiac Catalina Hardtop Coupe

For 1972, Catalinas and other full-sized Pontiacs received new Grand Prix-style "V" nose grilles and sturdier front bumpers that could withstand crashes of up to 5 mph (8.0 km/h), a year ahead of the Federal standard that took effect in 1973, along with revised taillight lenses.

The two-barrel 400 cubic-inch V8 was standard on all Catalina/Brougham/Safari models rated at 175 net horsepower compared to 265 gross horses in 1971 thanks to a switch in power measurements from gross ratings which were measured by a dynamometer with no accessories attached while the "net" figures were measured "as installed" in a vehicle with all accessories and emission gear hooked up. Optional engines included a two-barrel 455 rated at 185 hp (138 kW) and a four-barrel 455 rated at 250 hp (186 kW). The year 1972 was the last for the Catalina convertible and the Catalina Brougham series.

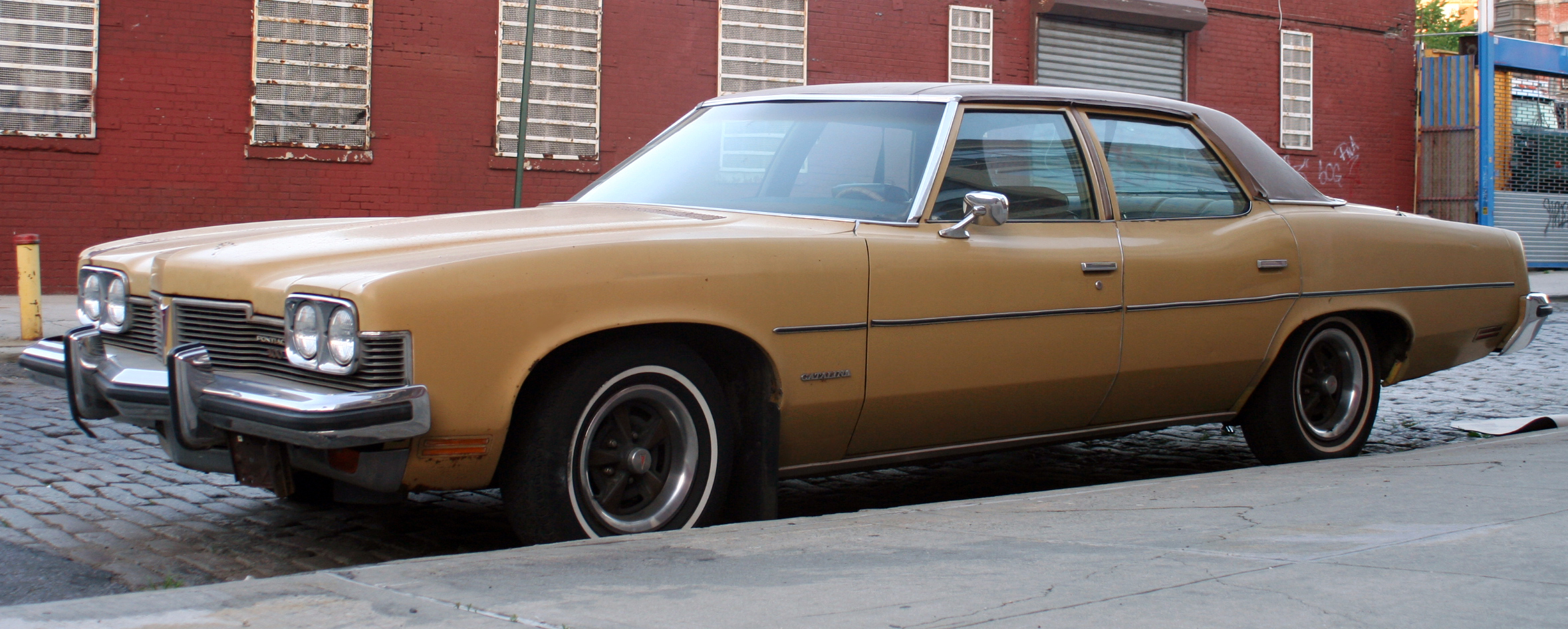
1973 Pontiac Catalina 4-door sedan

Catalina and other 1973 full-sized Pontiacs featured fuller-width split grilles along with the now-federally mandated 5 mph (8.0 km/h) front bumper, and revised taillight lenses. Instrument panels continued the "wrap-around" theme but the two round gauges were housed in square pods. With the Catalina Brougham discontinued only the regular Catalina models and Safari wagons were offered this year. Catalinas and other full-sized Pontiacs including Bonnevilles and Grand Villes now rode on a common 123.4-inch (3,130 mm) wheelbase for sedans and coupes though Safari and Grand Safari wagons continued on their own 127-inch (3,200 mm) wheelbase.

Catalina sedans and coupes came standard with a 350 cubic-inch V8 rated at 150 hp (112 kW), with a 170 hp (127 kW) 400 two-barrel optional and standard on Safari wagons. Optional engines included a 230 hp (172 kW) 400 four-barrel and 250 hp (186 kW) 455 four-barrel V8.

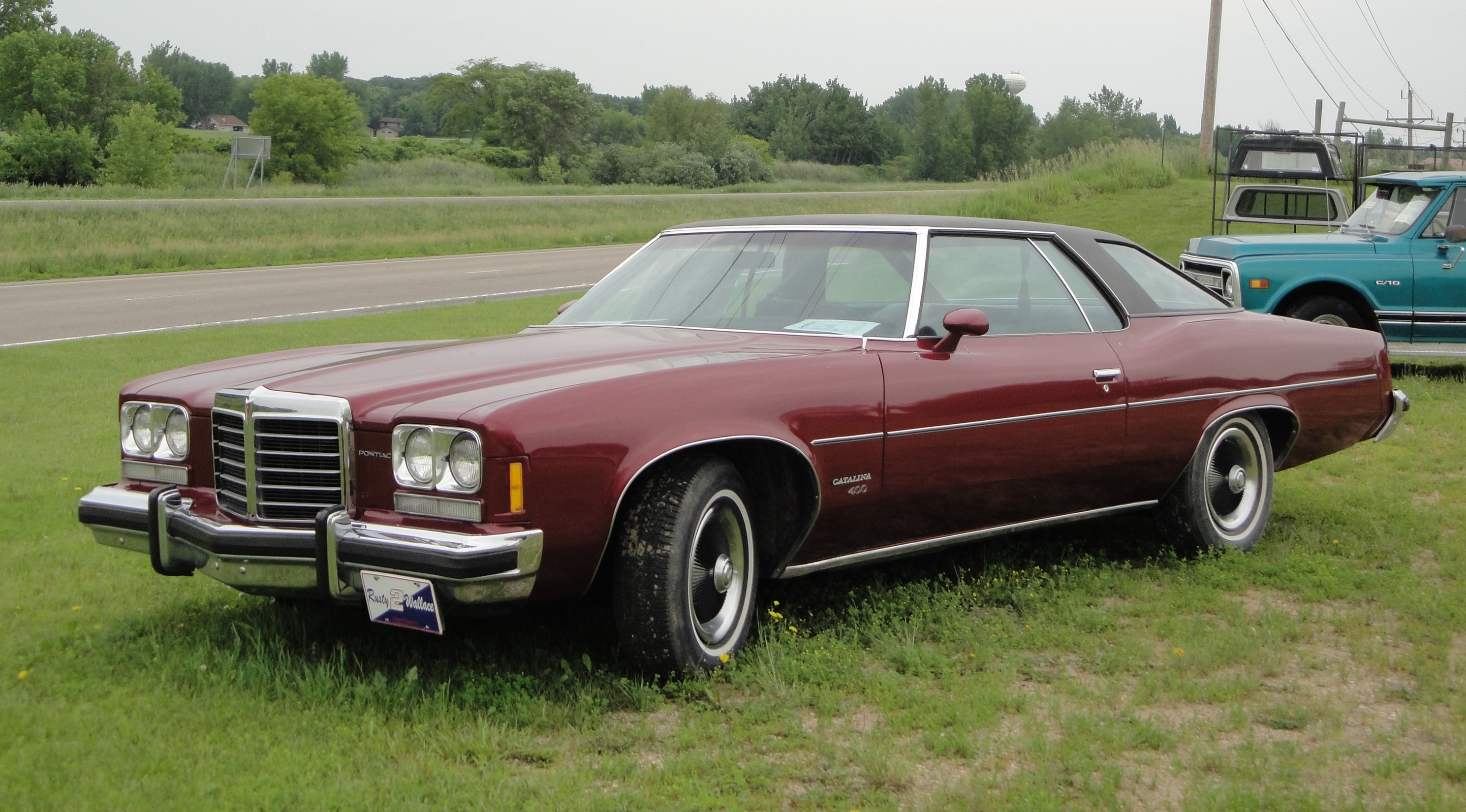
1974 Pontiac Catalina Hardtop Coupe. For 1974 the full-sized Pontiacs received a very Mercedes-esque grille

The 1974 Catalina and other big Pontiacs had a new Mercedes-like center split grille and revised rear styling with new 5 mph (8.0 km/h) bumpers on the aft end and license plate moved above the bumper. Two-door hardtop coupes featured new fixed triangular side windows, but kept the pillarless style with roll-down rear quarter windows, unlike Chevrolet, which eliminated the rolldown rear quarters in the Caprice and Impala Custom coupes. The four-door pillared and hardtop sedans were virtually unchanged from 1973. Interiors were much the same as 1973 except for a revised standard steering wheel and new cut-pile carpeting.

New to the option list were adjustable accelerator and brake pedals, a Pontiac exclusive (and seldom ordered), and a Radial Tuned Suspension that included the upgraded tires along with other suspension mods such as front and rear sway bars.

The 170-horsepower 400 V8 with two-barrel carburetor was now the standard engine on all models with a 225-horsepower 400 four-barrel and 250-horsepower 455 four-barrel V8 available as options. Also for 1974, the Safari wagon was renamed the Catalina Safari and continued to share interior and exterior trims with sedans and coupes.

Multiple economic factors affected sales, beginning with the 1973–1975 recession, the 1973 oil crisis and the introduction of smaller, more fuel efficient vehicles like the Pontiac Grand Am and imported vehicles like the Toyota Cressida, the Mercedes-Benz 280E and the BMW 530.

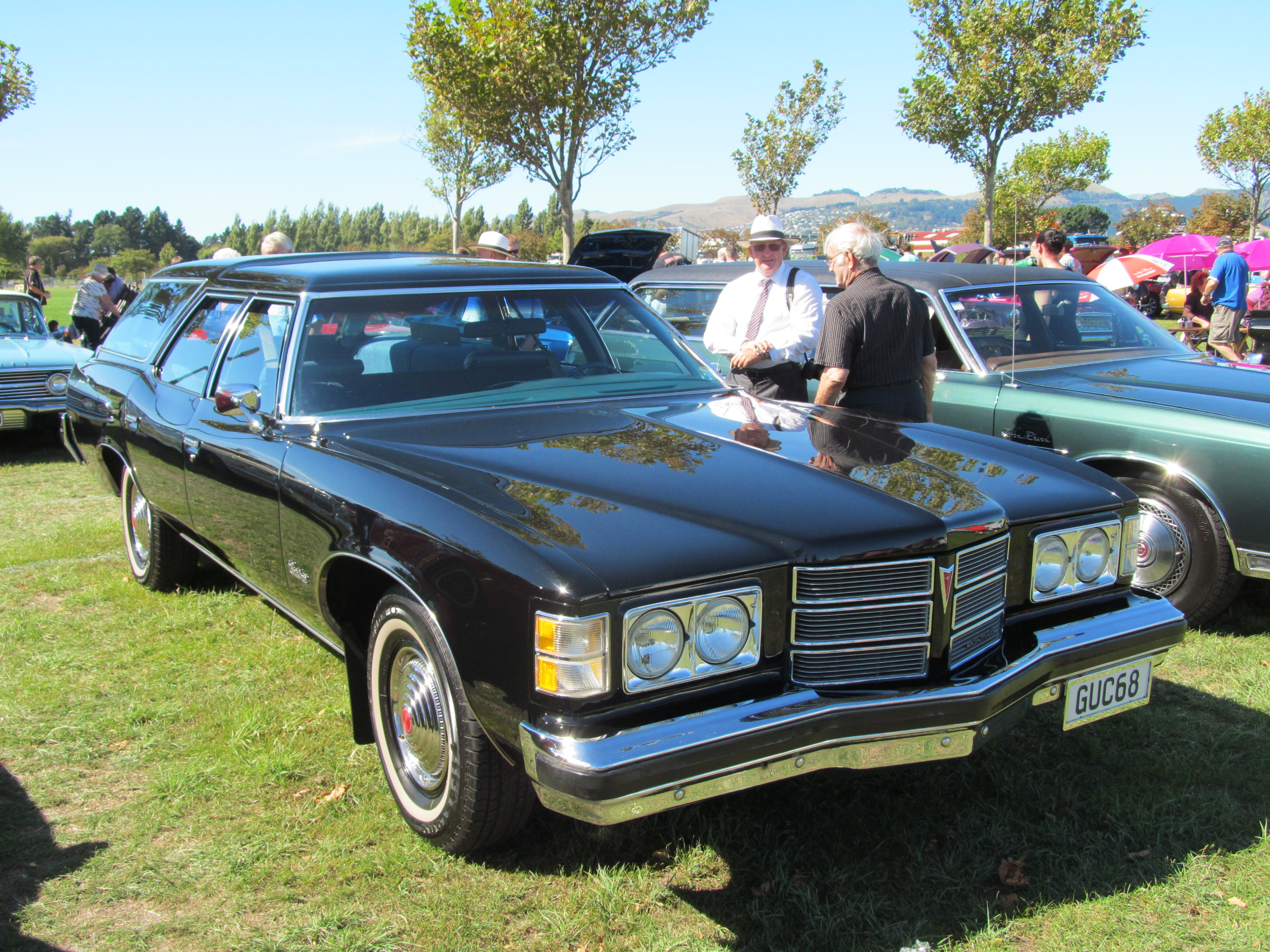
1975 Pontiac Catalina Safari

The year 1975 brought revised front and rear styling to Catalinas and other full-sized Pontiacs, along with standard radial tires and electronic ignition. The same assortment of 400 and 455 engines carried over from 1974 with reduced horsepower ratings ranging from 170 to 200, but now mated to catalytic converters, which provided improved driveability and fuel economy over previous emission control equipment, but mandated the use of unleaded gasoline. Four-door pillared and hardtop sedans featured new six-window styling with the sixth window on the hardtop sedan functioning as an opera window. 1975 also marked the end of Pontiac convertible production until 1982; the Grand Ville Brougham was the last full-size Pontiac convertible.

For 1976, only minor detail changes were made to Catalinas and other full-sized Pontiacs that included revised grilles (with rectangular headlights now on Catalinas with the "Custom Trim Option-round headlights continued on base models) and taillight lenses. This year was the last for the 1971-vintage bodyshell, optional adjustable pedals, 455 V8 and the clamshell tailgate on Safari wagons. 1976 also marked the return of the Bonneville Brougham series to the top of the full-size line, as Pontiac marketers abandoned the Grand Ville name entirely.

Pontiac Catalina Production Figures
	Yearly Total
1971	129,983
1972	228,262
1973	237,065
1974	110,599
1975	90,011
1976	62,497
Total	858,417

=== 1977–1981 ===
Fifth generation
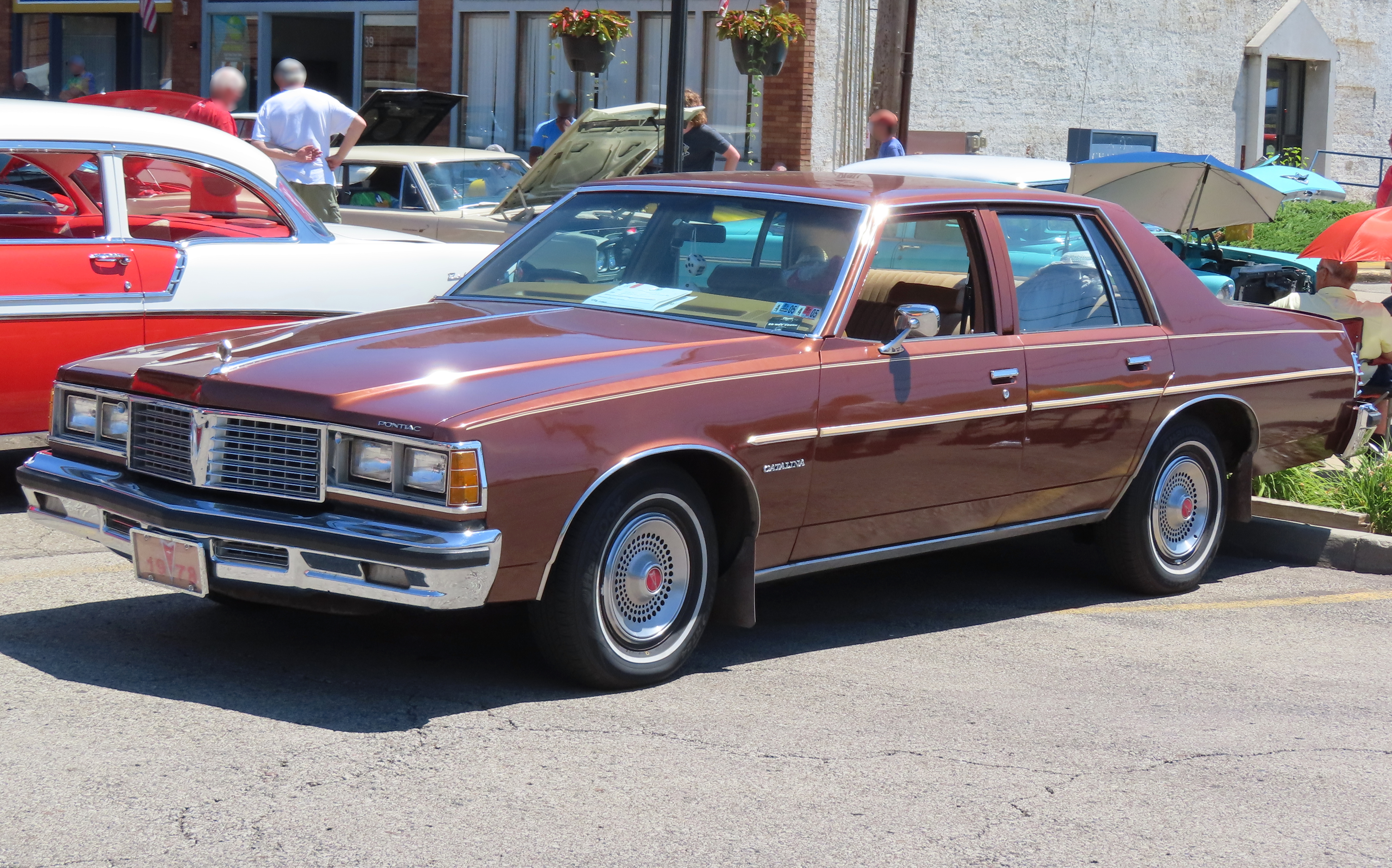
- 1978 Pontiac Catalina 4-door sedan

Overview
- Production: 1977–1981
- Assembly: Pontiac, Michigan, US (Pontiac Assembly); Kansas City, Kansas, US (Fairfax Assembly); Oshawa, Ontario, Canada (Catalina, Laurentian) (Oshawa Car Assembly)

Body and chassis
- Body style: 2-door coupe 2-door landau coupe 4-door sedan 4-door station wagon
- Related: Pontiac Bonneville

Powertrain
- Engine: 231 cu in (3.8 L) Buick V6; 250 cu in (4.1 L) Chevrolet Straight-6; 265 cu in (4.3 L) Pontiac V8; 301 cu in (4.9 L) Pontiac V8; 350 cu in (5.7 L) Oldsmobile Diesel V8; 350 cu in (5.7 L) Pontiac V8; 400 cu in (6.6 L) Pontiac V8; 403 cu in (6.6 L) Oldsmobile V8
- Transmission: 3-speed THM200 automatic 4-speed THM200-4R automatic 3-speed THM350 automatic

Dimensions
- Wheelbase: 116 in (2,946 mm)

In 1977, Pontiac and other GM divisions downsized their full-sized cars in an effort to lighten weight and improve gas mileage. The Catalina continued as Pontiac's entry-level full-size automobile with a Buick-built 231 cubic-inch V6 now standard in sedans and coupes (Safari wagons came standard with V8 power) and optional V8s of 301 CID, 350 CID and 400 CID displacements, each Pontiac-built engines and offered in all states except California. The Pontiac 350 was offered in 1977, but replaced by Buick and Oldsmobile 350 V8s from 1978 to 1980; and the Pontiac 400, offered through 1978, was replaced by an Oldsmobile 403 V8 in 1979 only. An Oldsmobile-built 350 Diesel V8 was optional for 1980 and 1981, along with another cut-down Pontiac V8 of 265 CID.

With the downsized 1977 model, the Catalina Safari got a new two-way tailgate that could be opened to the side as a door or lowered as a tailgate which replaced the more complicated 1971-76 clamshell tailgate design. The wagons also shared the same full-coil spring suspension as their sedan counterparts, rather than the multi-leaf springs found on 1971-76 Safaris.

As Pontiac V8s were completely banned from the State of California beginning in 1977 due to the inability to meet the state's more stringent emission control standards, Catalinas (and Bonnevilles) sold in California were equipped with engines from other GM divisions through 1981. Those included the Buick 231 V6 and an assortment of V8s including the Chevrolet 305, Oldsmobile 307, Buick and Oldsmobile 350s, and Oldsmobile 403 V8.

The Catalina was discontinued after the 1981 model year as Pontiac sought to abandon the full-sized car market as part of GM's continued downsizing program. When production of the Catalina nameplate ended in 1981, over 3.8 million Catalinas had been sold since 1959.

Pontiac Catalina Production Figures
	Yearly Total
1977	61,678
1978	48,931
1979	33,531
1980	13,727
1981	7,530
Total	214,328

== Canada and Canadian exports ==
Strato Chief, Laurentian, Parisienne and Grande Parisienne

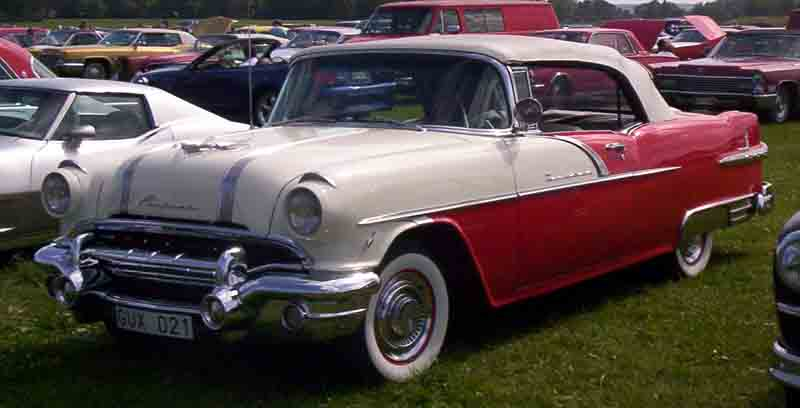
1956 Pontiac Laurentian convertible

From the 1950s through 1970s, GM of Canada offered a unique hierarchy of full-size Pontiac series different from the American Catalina, Star Chief, Executive and Bonneville lines. In Canada, Pontiac was still marketed as a medium priced make, but with a lower price spread than those in the U.S. Closely paralleling Chevrolet's Biscayne, Bel Air and Impala series, by 1959 the Canadian models were named Strato Chief, Laurentian and Pontiac Parisienne. The Strato-Chief series had been introduced for 1958, replacing the Pathfinder De Luxe. When Chevrolet introduced the "Super Sport" as a distinct model line in 1962, GM of Canada soon made available a similarly equipped Pontiac "Custom Sport" (rebadged Pontiac "2+2" in 1967 to mirror a name used by Pontiac in the US for a sporty model based on its Catalina series). And when Chevrolet rolled out its topline Caprice model in mid-1965 to compete with Ford's newly introduced upscale Ford LTD, GM of Canada introduced the "Grande Parisienne" trim series for the 1966 model year. For the 4 years that Grande Parisienne was offered, 1966-1969 it was available as a 2-door hardtop, 4 door hardtop, or the model with no twin in the US, the 1967-1968 Grande Parisienne station wagon with hideaway headlights. Front end styling copied the U.S. market Grand Prix.

Like all Canadian Pontiacs built from 1955 to 1970, Laurentians used full-size Chevrolet chassis, drive trains, and other parts, but using a body shell similar in style to, but not interchangeable with, the U.S. Catalina. For example, a 1964 Pontiac Laurentian looks like a Catalina, but has more in common with the Chevrolet Bel Air. Through at least 1967, however, the Laurentian wore the three "stars" normally associated with the Pontiac Star Chief/Executive series, even though other exterior trim pieces were similar to the Catalina.

The Laurentian was available in all the body styles used for the Chevrolet Bel Air, including hardtop coupes and sedans, through the 1962 model run. After 1963, hardtops were offered only in the Parisienne and Grande Parisienne series (first offered in 1966), which paralleled the Chevrolet Impala and Caprice respectively. However, two-door hardtops returned to the Strato Chief and Laurentian series in 1969 because Pontiac discontinued its Catalina 2-door sedan in the U.S. after the 1968 model run.

The Canadian model line nameplates were never sold in the U.S. They were built for the Canadian market and for export from Canada as disassembled "crate" or "kit" cars. The one exception came when the Parisienne became an American Pontiac offering beginning in mid-1983 through 1986, although by this time the U.S. and Canadian offerings were identical. As the only remaining full-size Pontiac model available at the time, the Canadian Parisienne had been coveted by US dealerships as a flagship model to fill that market segment and compete with the Caprice offered by Chevrolet dealers. The existing name was deemed suitable for the purpose and production was simply extended to cover both countries.

Right-hand drive Laurentians were assembled from CKD kits by GM Holden in Australia from 1959 to 1963. In Australia, Laurentian was replaced by Parisienne for 1964. Parisiennes and Laurentians were assembled from CKD kits by GM South Africa in South Africa; and from SKD kits by GM New Zealand in New Zealand.

As well, these kits were assembled for both Left-hand drive and Right-hand drive markets in Europe at a GM plant in Antwerp, Belgium.

Canadian Pontiacs were used in part because, for fellow Commonwealth countries, there were advantages with import duties. But largely due first to the economies of part sourcing two separate GM lines from the same parts bin. Second, with higher gasoline prices and lower discretionary spending than in the US, Canadian Pontiacs like Chevrolets were more affordable, hence more marketable overseas. Thirdly, without the bulk and weight of American Pontiacs, their Canadian counterparts were better adapted where space can be limited, as in Europe and in a British RHD environment where an overly large full-size car suffers considerable disadvantages.

These RHD cars had the same dashboards whether Chevrolet or Pontiac (Impalas and Bel Airs were also exported to RHD markets) and only one dash design per bodyshell run so the 61-64 models had the one dash (a RHD version of the 1961 Pontiac layout) even though it changed annually in Canada and the 65-68s all had a 'transposed' version of the '65 Chevrolet dash. The RHD cars also had antiquated, short, 'clap-hands' wipers that almost met in the middle of the windshield rather than the parallel wipers of the LHD Canadian cars. Local radios, upholstery and two-speed heater/demisters were fitted – some Australian cars had local Frigidaire air conditioning.

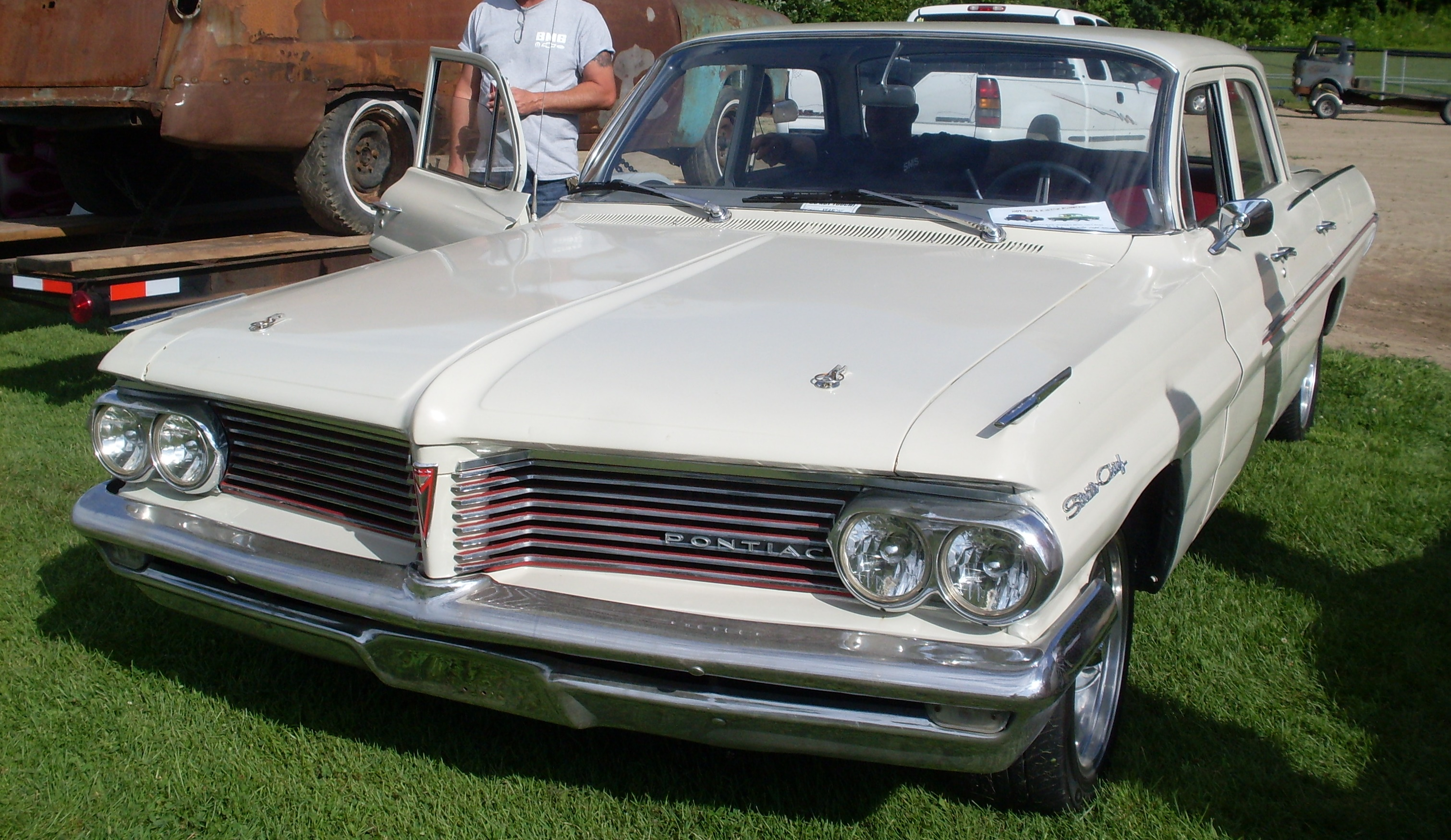
1962 Pontiac Strato-Chief 4-Door Sedan (Canada)

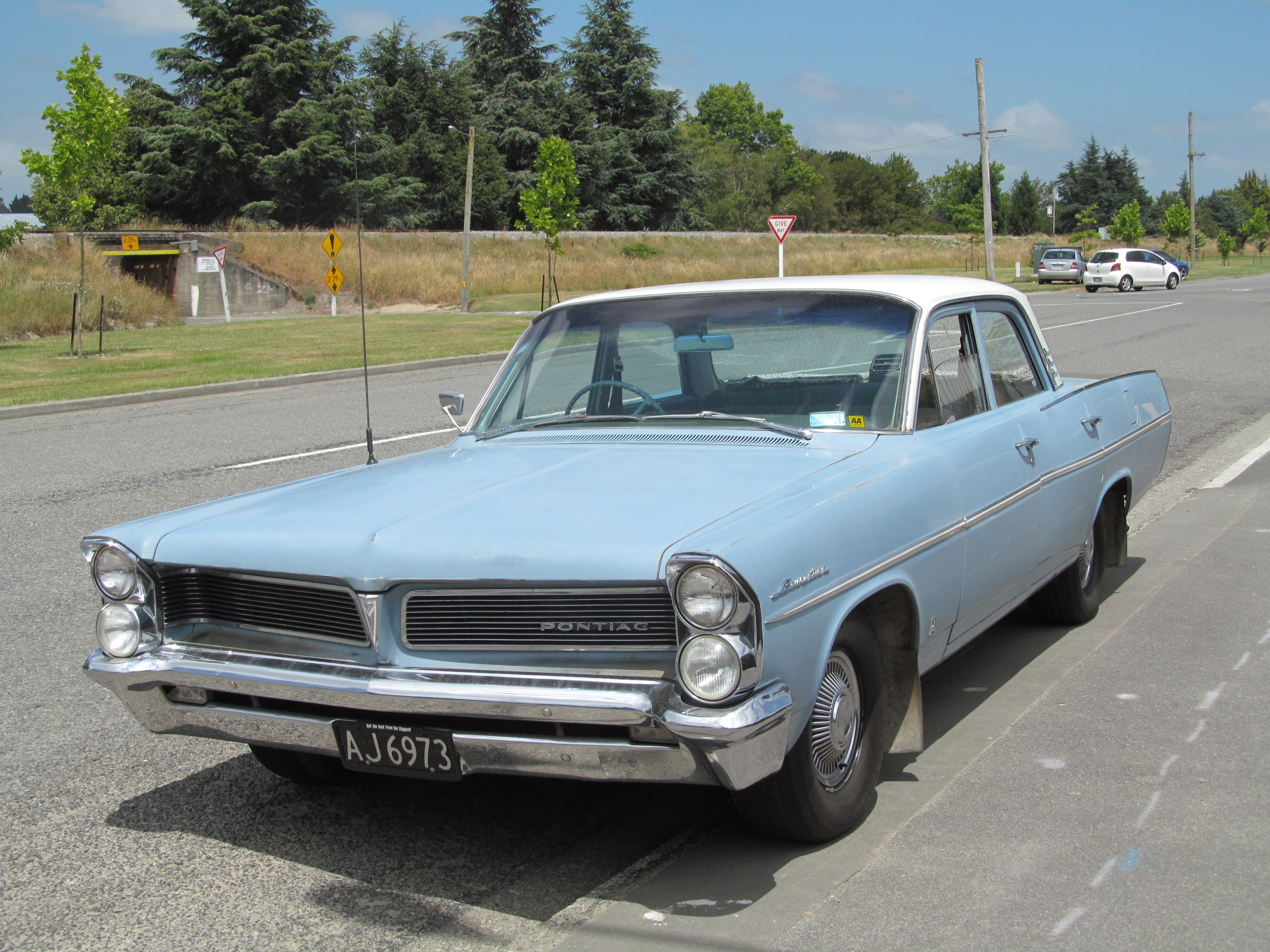
New Zealand-assembled 1963 Pontiac Laurentian

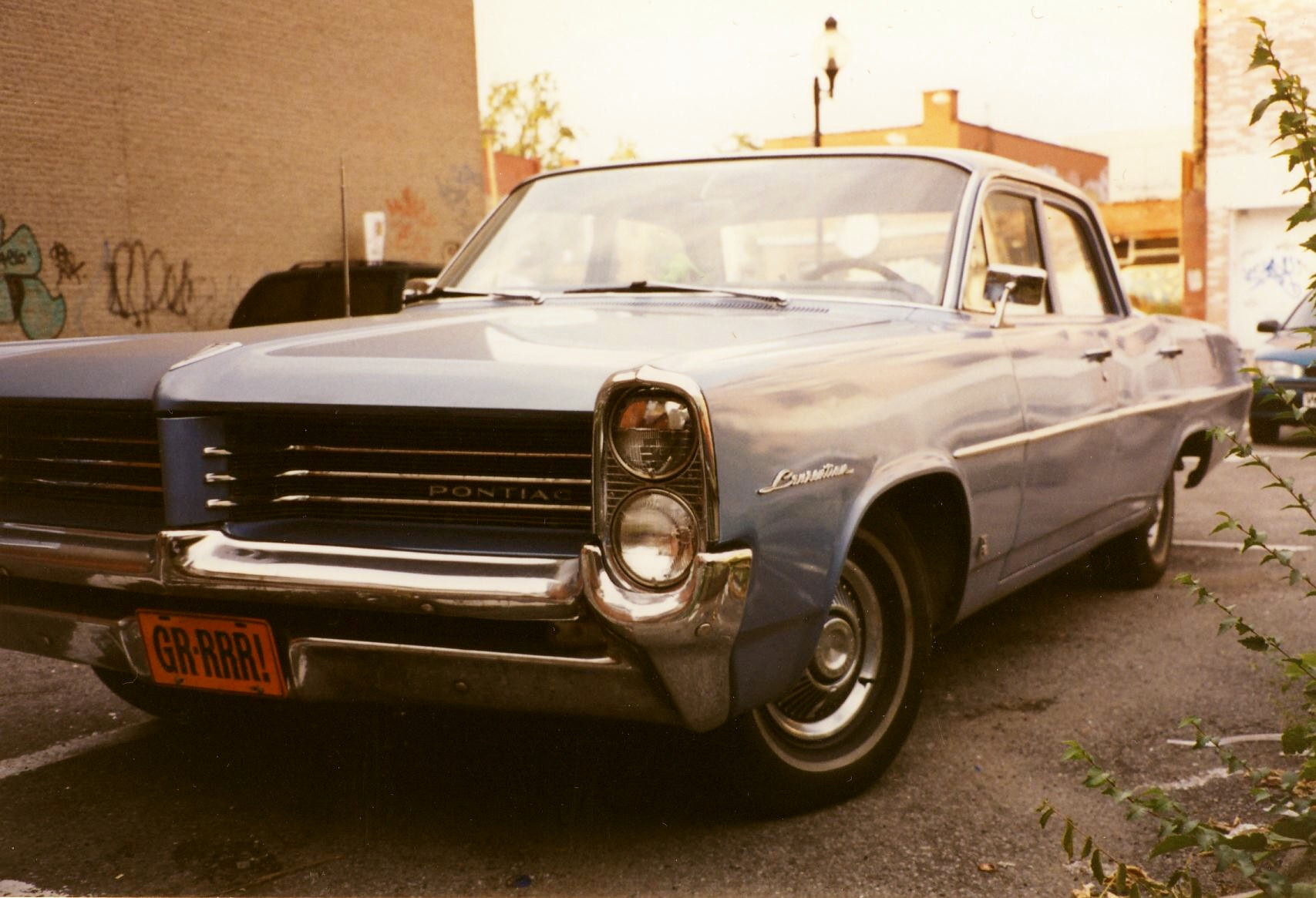
1964 Pontiac Laurentian 4-Door Sedan

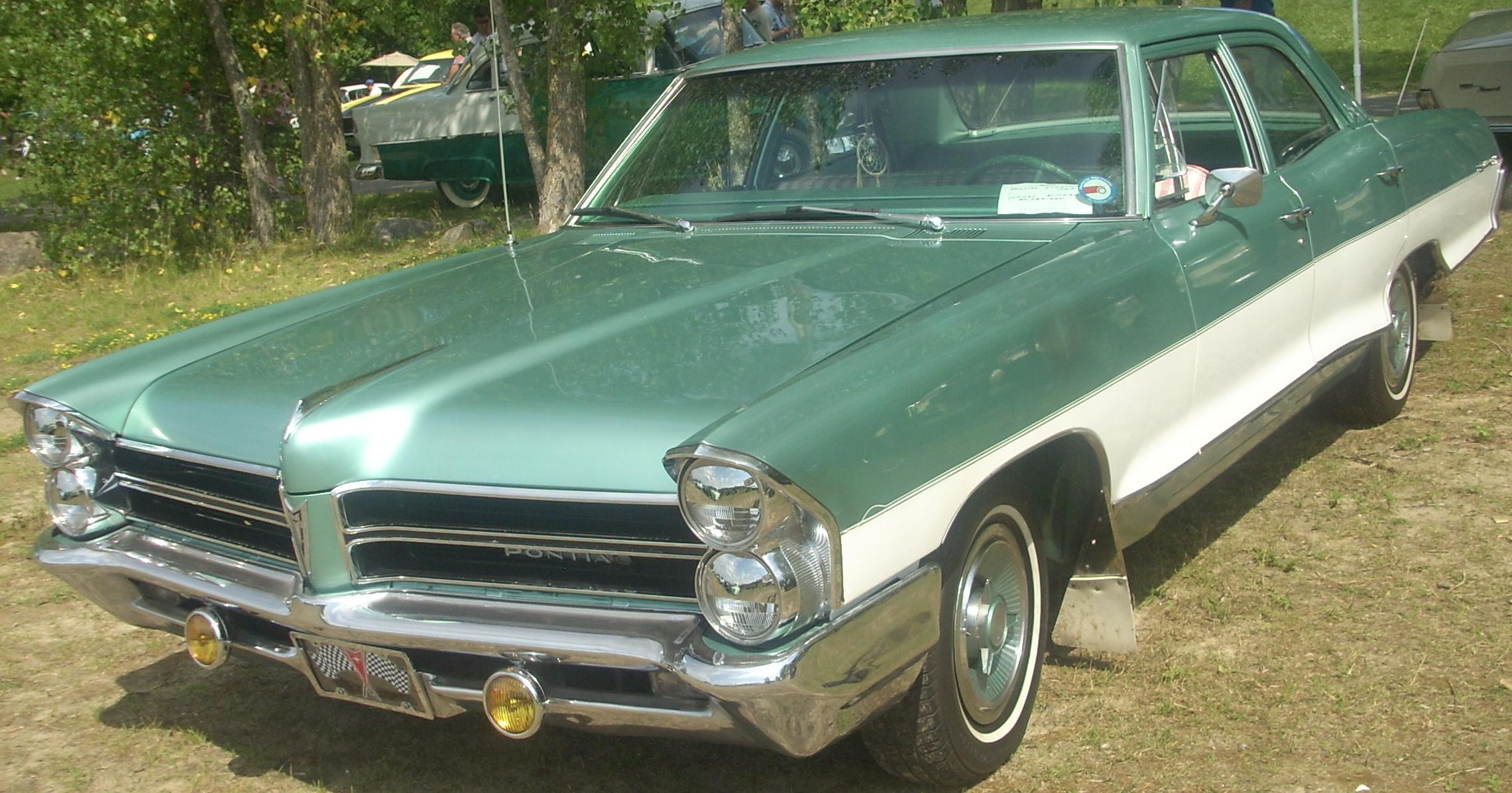
1965 Pontiac Strato-Chief (Canada)

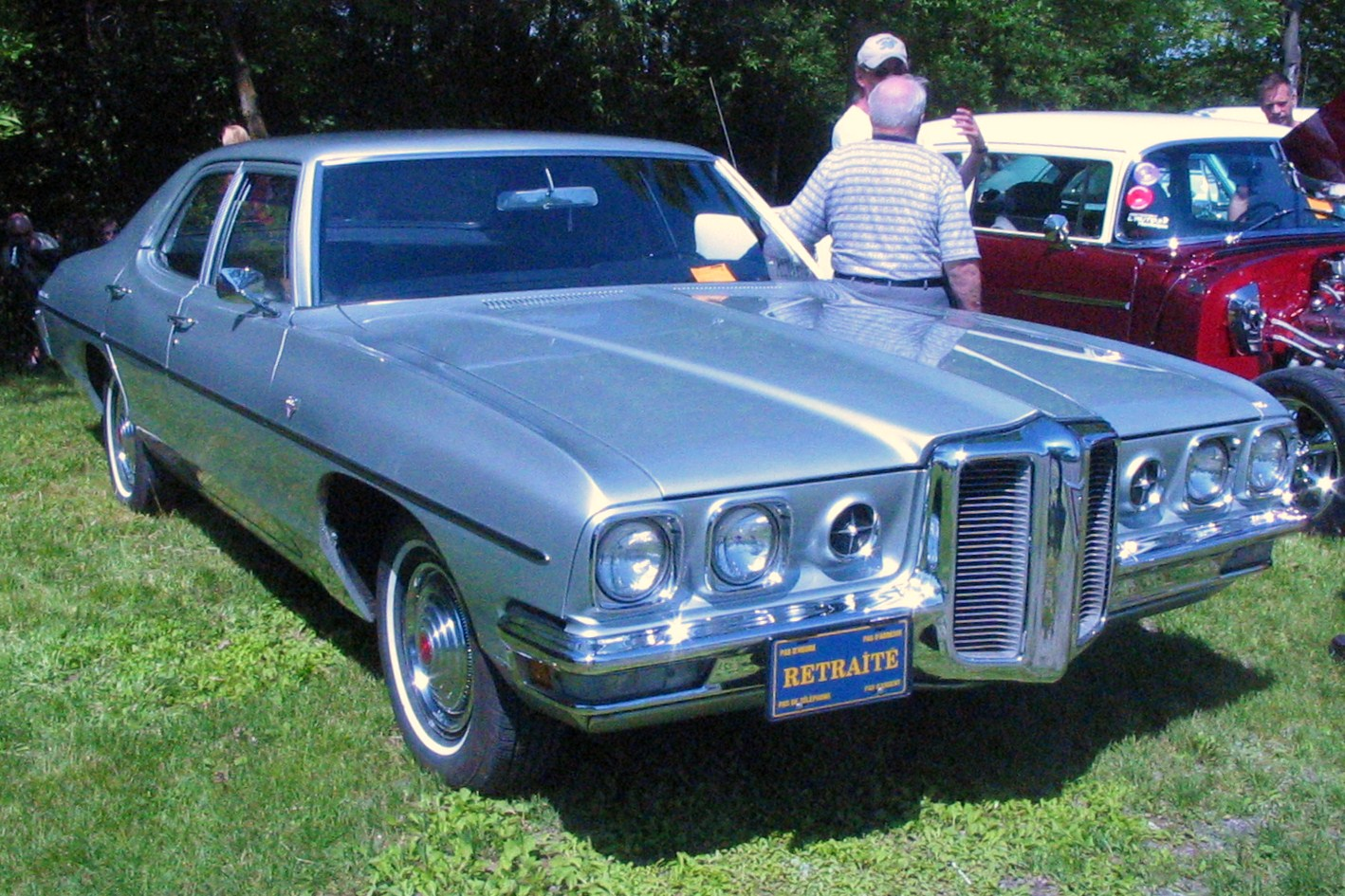
1970 Pontiac Laurentian Four-Door Sedan

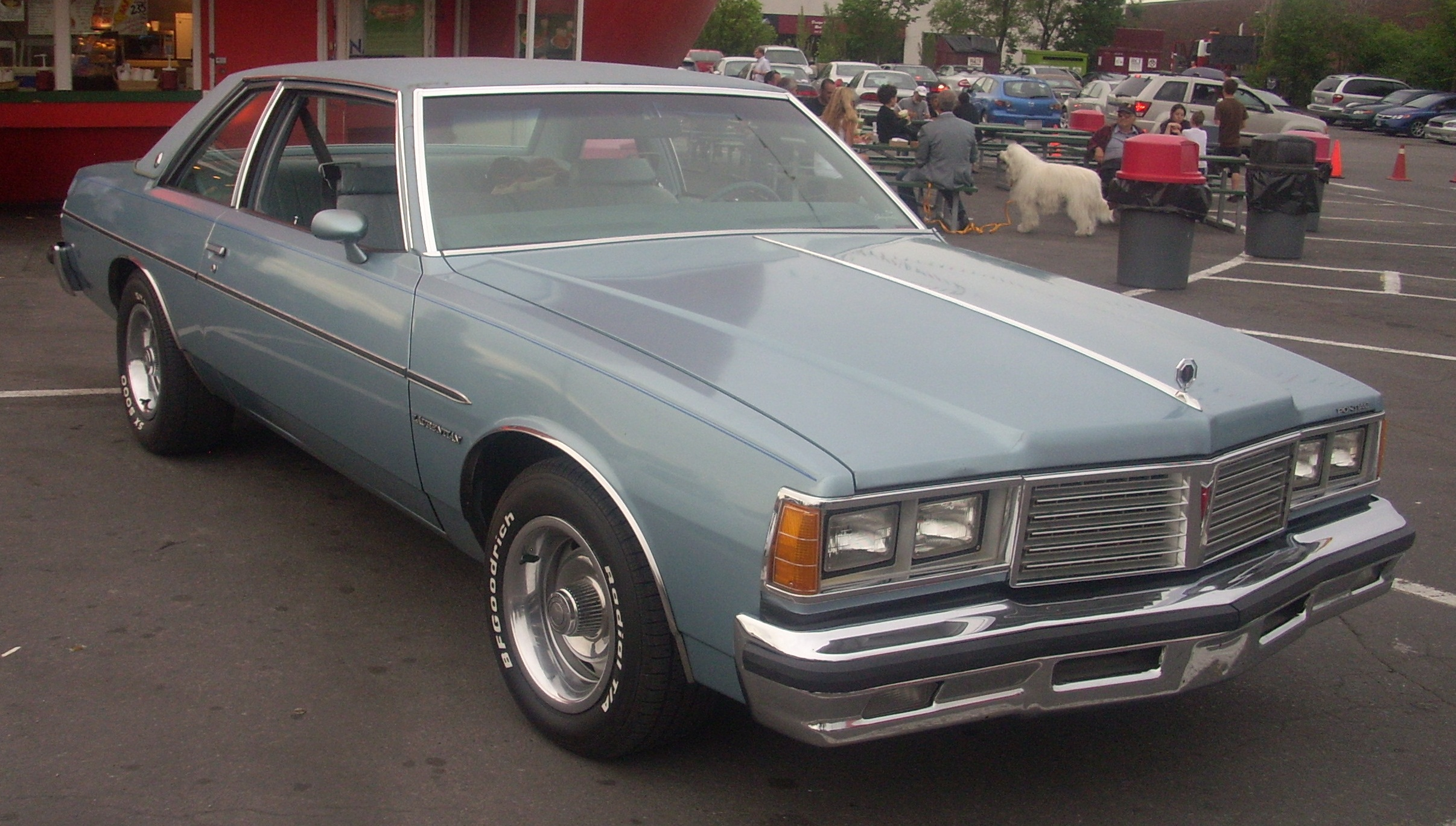
1978 Pontiac Laurentian 2-Door Coupe (with non-standard wheels)
