= Pontiac 2+2 =

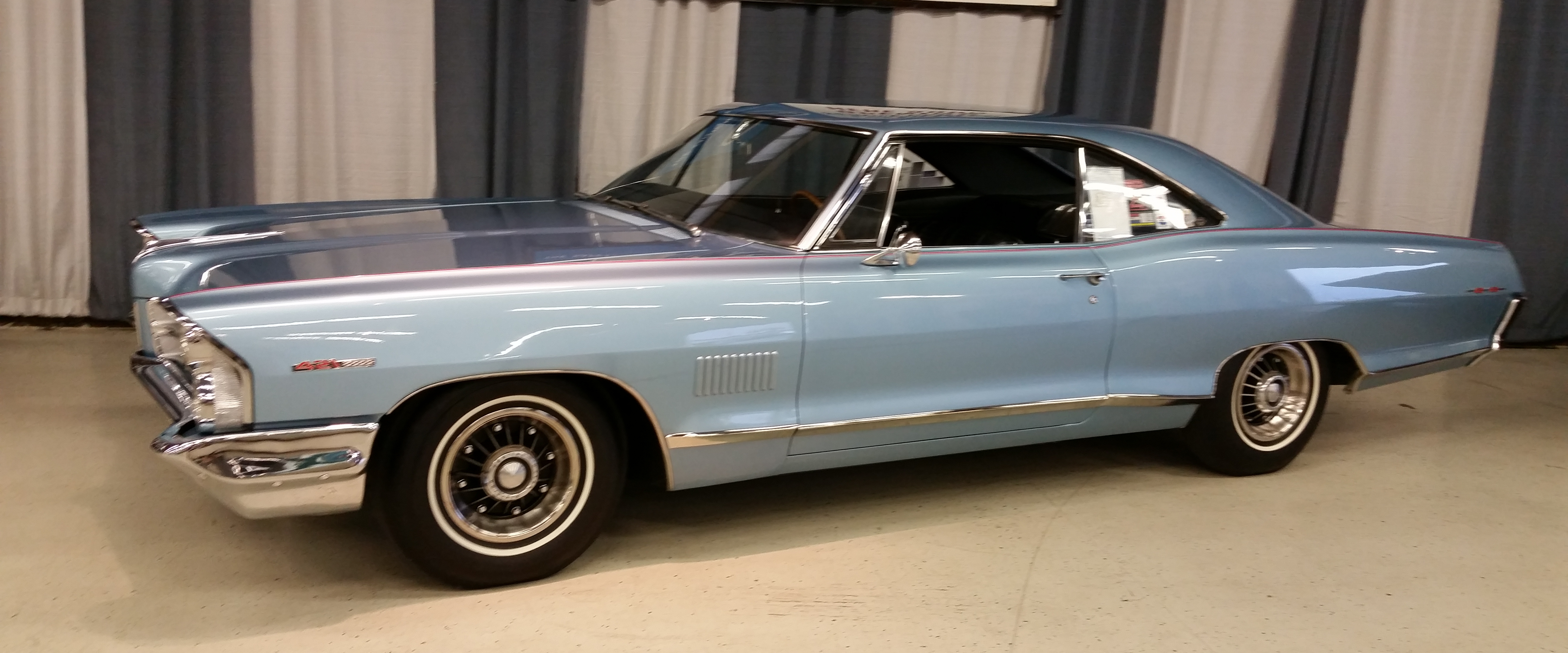
- 1965 Pontiac 2+2 Sports Coupe

Overview
- Manufacturer: Pontiac (General Motors)
- Also called: Parisienne 2+2 (Canada)
- Production: 1964—1967 in the U.S.
- Assembly: Pontiac Assembly, Pontiac, Michigan; Arlington Assembly, Arlington, Texas; Doraville Assembly, Doraville, Georgia; Fairfax Assembly, Kansas City, Kansas; Linden Assembly, Linden, New Jersey; South Gate Assembly, South Gate, California

Body and chassis
- Class: Full-size car
- Body style: 2-door coupe, convertible
- Related: Pontiac Catalina

Powertrain
- Engine: 389 cu in (6.4 L) Pontiac V8; 421 cu in (6.9 L) Pontiac V8; 428 cu in (7.0 L) Pontiac V8
- Transmission: 3 or 4-speed manual, 3-speed automatic

Dimensions
- Wheelbase: 121 in (3,073 mm)
- Length: 214 in (5,436 mm)
- Height: 48 in (1,219 mm)

The Pontiac 2+2 is a full size automobile that was manufactured by Pontiac, built on the B-body chassis. It debuted for the 1964 model year as a trim-only option for the Pontiac Catalina, with special door panels, bucket seats with a center console, and exterior badging. Pontiac marketed the 2+2 as the "big brother" to the popular Pontiac GTO.

Beginning in 1965 the name Catalina was no longer found on the car, although it was still an option on the Catalina. The 2+2 was equipped with a 421 cu in (6.9 L) V8 engine, dual exhaust, heavy-duty front springs as well as unique exterior body trim. It continued on the same platform, but became a separate Pontiac series for the 1966 model year. The 2+2 reverted to an option on the Catalina for 1967 and was discontinued in the United States the same year due to poor sales.

It continued as a series in Canada until 1970. All Canadian-built 2+2s were composed of the Chevrolet B body shell with Pontiac exterior sheet metal, offering the full range of Chevrolet engines available from inline 6-cylinder to big-block V8.

The name 2+2 reappeared briefly in 1986 on the Pontiac Grand Prix 2+2 G-body "aerobody" coupe, of which 1,225 were built.

== Design ==
The designation 2+2 was borrowed from European sports car terminology, for a seating arrangement of two in front plus two in the rear. It was designated officially at Pontiac as a "regular performance" model, a thoroughly confusing designation for a vehicle that was clearly intended to be to the Catalina platform what the GTO was to the A-body Lemans: the standard drivetrain was a 2-barrel carburetor version of Pontiac's 389 cu in (6.4 L) V8 coupled to a floor-mounted 3-speed manual transmission; 3-speed automatic and 4-speed manual were options, as were a 4-barrel and Pontiac's 3x2 Tri-Power configuration. The suspension was stiffened with heavy-duty springs and a sway bar for improved handling. Starting in 1965 the 389 was replaced by a high-compression 421 cu in (6.9 L) V8, with displacement increased to the 428 CID in 1967.

Although the 2+2 was discontinued by 1968, all options (except the Tri-Power, which Pontiac discontinued after 1966 under a mandate from GM) were still available, and units could be ordered with what amounted to a 2+2 without the badges.

=== Exterior ===
The 2+2 was only available as a hardtop coupe or convertible. Distinguishing a 2+2 visually from a Catalina were faux louvers on the fenders or quarter panels. Annual changes meant the look and placement of the louvers were on different locations on the fenders from one year to the next. 1964 was the only year that the 2+2 came without them. Along with the badges that appeared on the fenders, hood, and interior to identify the 2+2, other details that appeared included a metal trim that ran the full length of the car, along the lower body line and skirt on the 1965 and 1966, and at mid-door height on the 1967. Another distinguishing feature was the pin-stripe trim package offered on 1965-67 models.

=== Interior ===
The sport interior was equipped with individual bucket seats for all passengers. Automatic transmission cars had a column shift as standard equipment, console and floor shift were optional. Manual transmission cars had a floor shift as standard equipment. The console was an option. The elegant Catalina dashboard was carried over as well and fitted with fully functional gauges. Other optional features included a console-mounted vacuum gauge, to monitor efficient engine use while driving, and a tachometer mounted at the top left corner of the dash fascia and later the hood, as an option in 1967.

== Engine ==
The Catalina and 2+2 were built on the shorter platform, but came with the same engine options as the larger Pontiac Bonneville model. The smaller 389 cu in (6.4 L) engine was standard in the Catalina, but not available in the 1965-1967 model 2+2s. All Canadian-built 2+2s were equipped with Chevrolet engines. The 1986 GP 2+2's were all equipped with a 165 hp (123 kW; 167 PS) 305 cu in (5.0 L) GM V8 and automatic transmission.

=== 1964 ===
Pontiac offered the 2+2 as a $291 ($3,021 in 2025 dollars) trim option only in 1964 to the base Catalina 2-door hardtop list price of $2,869 ($29,783 in 2025 dollars). Most of the trim specifics were found in the passenger compartment. Without the 2+2 badges on the outside, it looked like the base Catalina. Standard was the 389 cu in (6.4 L), OHV Trophy V8, rated at 283 hp (211 kW) with a Rochester 2-bbl carburetor, and a 3-speed transmission controlled by a floor shifter mounted through the center console. A 4-speed was available at extra cost, as was an automatic.

Model year	Engine name	Displacement	Carburetor series (bbl)	Output at rpm	Torque at rpm
1964	Trophy V8	389 cu in (6.4 L)	Rochester 2-G (2)	283 hp (211 kW; 287 PS) at 4400	418 lb⋅ft (567 N⋅m) at 2800
1964	Trophy V8	389 cu in (6.4 L)	Rochester 2-G (2) x3	330 hp (246 kW; 335 PS) at 4600	430 lb⋅ft (583 N⋅m) at 3200
1964	Trophy V8	421 cu in (6.9 L)	Rochester 2-G (4)	320 hp (239 kW; 324 PS) at 4400	455 lb⋅ft (617 N⋅m) at 2800

=== 1965-67 ===
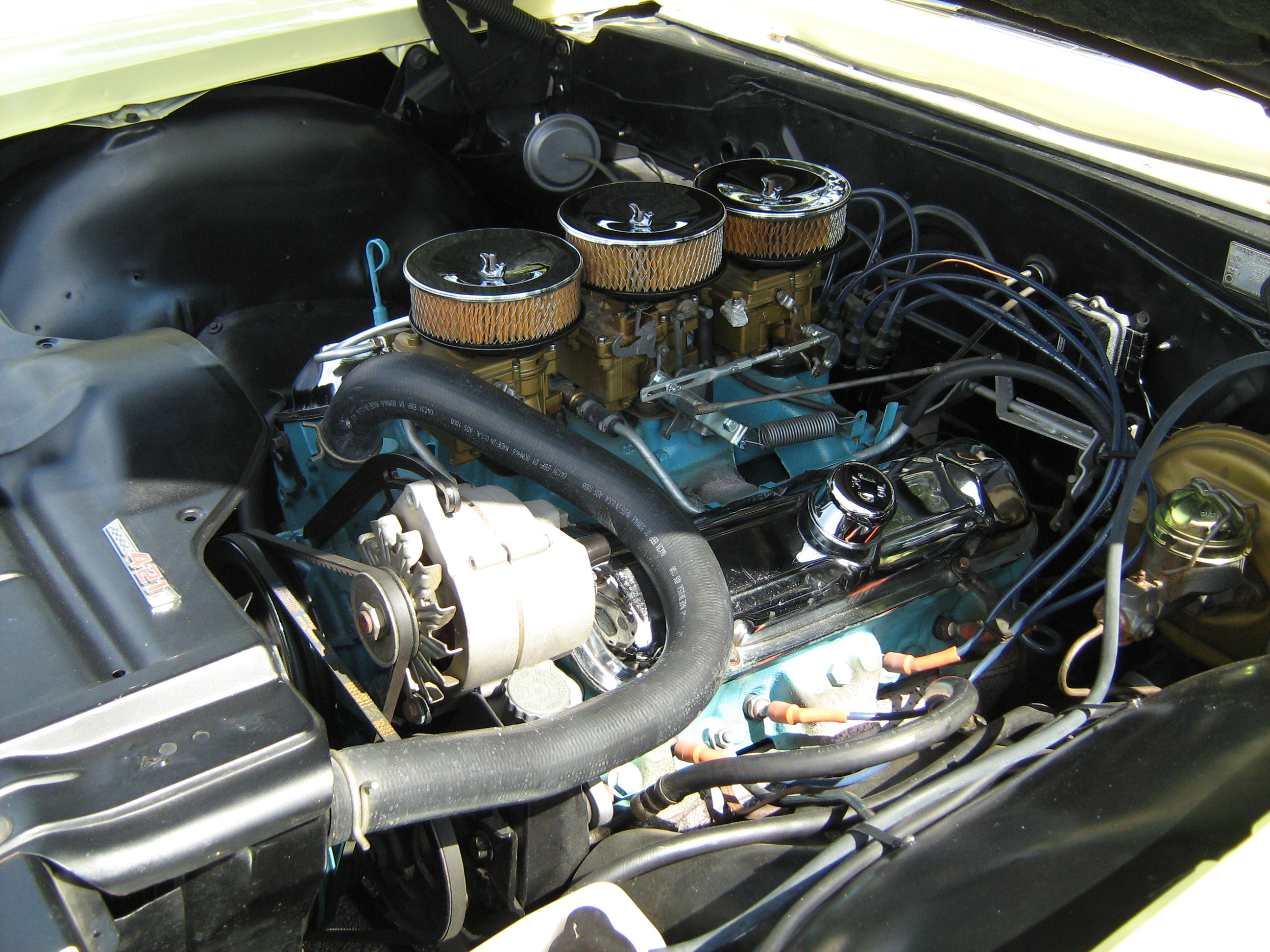
1965 Pontiac 2+2 coupe 421 CID tri-power

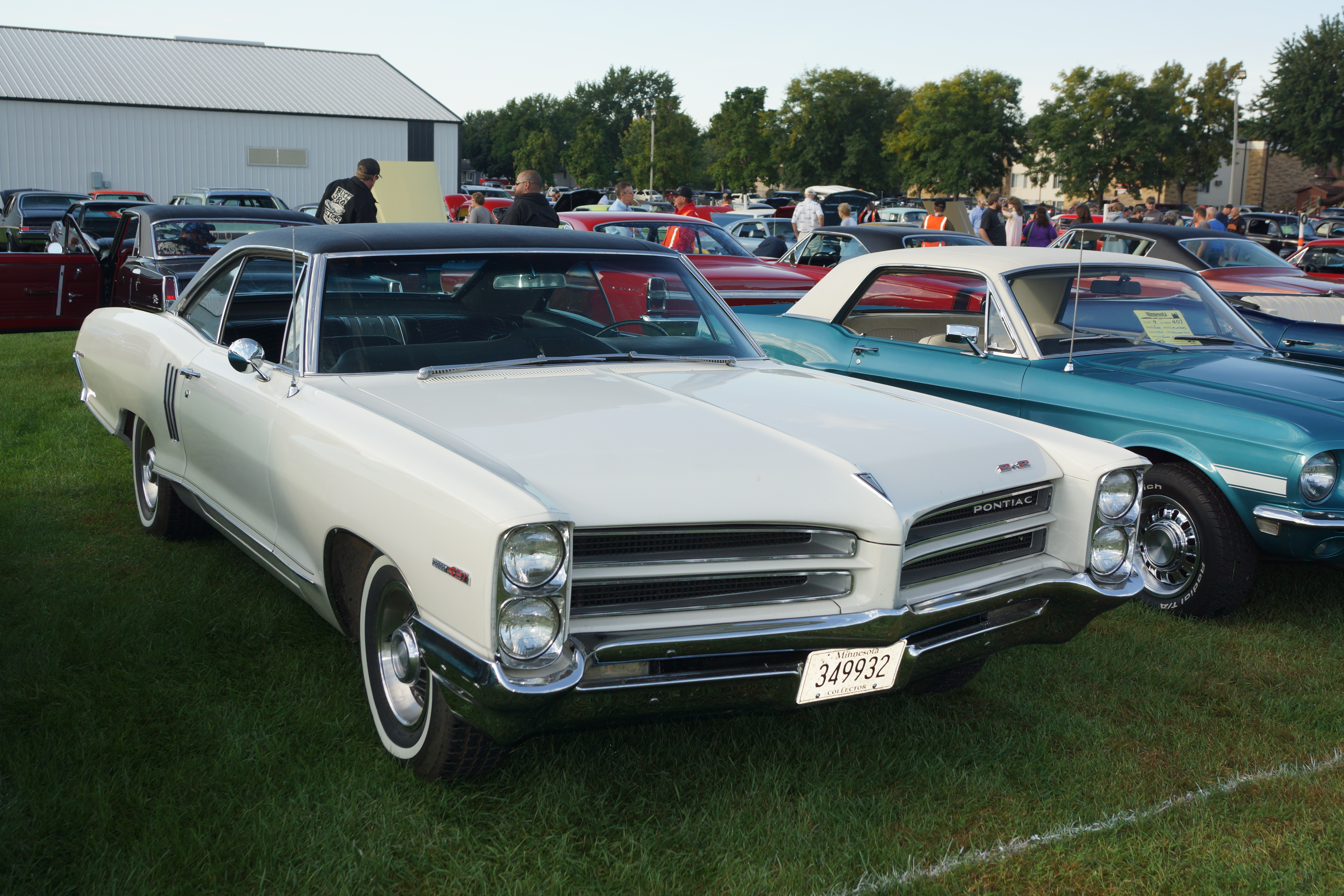
1966 Pontiac 2+2

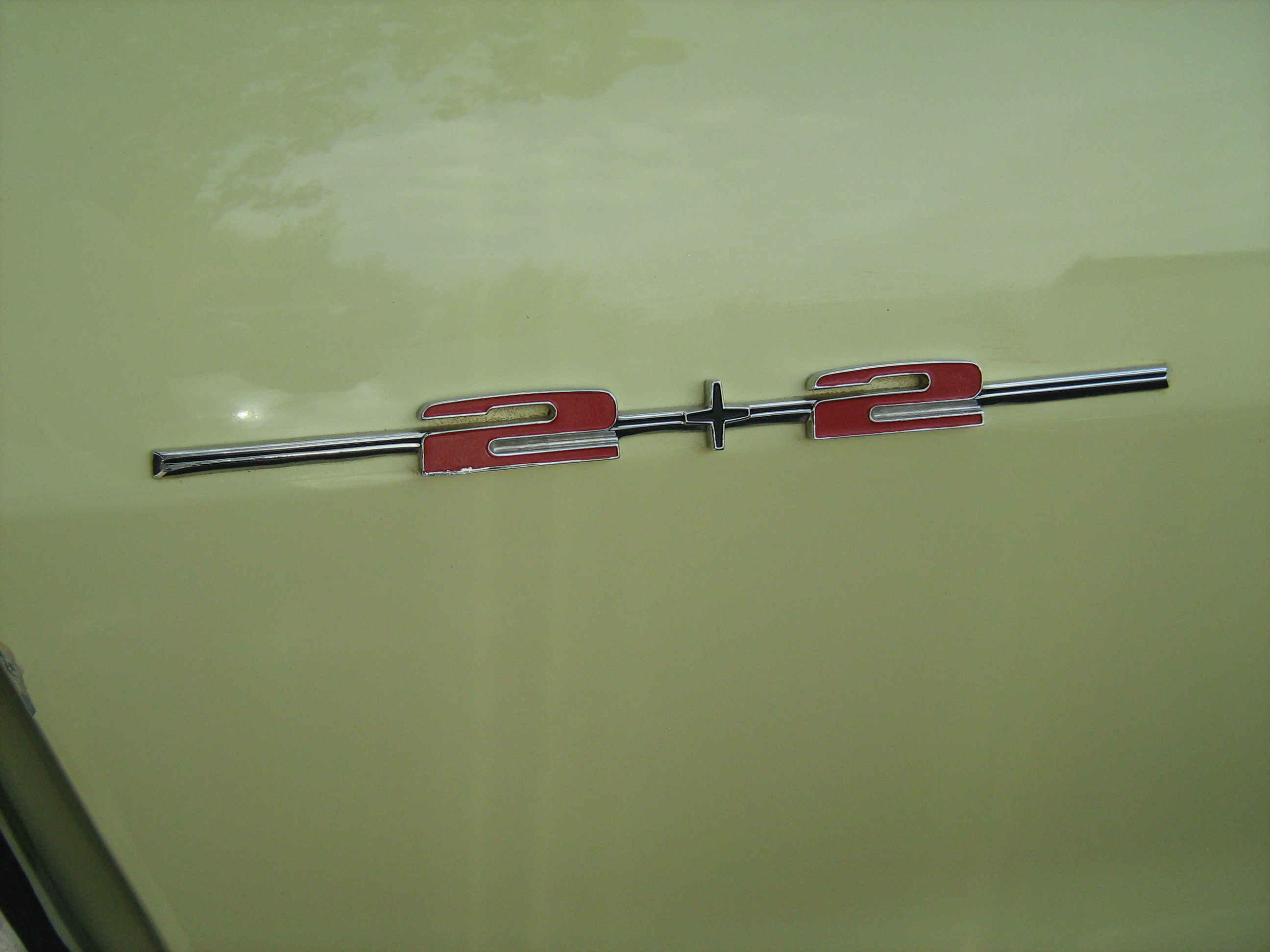
Detail of the 2+2 emblem on a 1965 Pontiac 2+2 coupe 421 CID tri-power

Pontiac dropped the "Trophy" name for the 1965 model year, but it was also the year that the model featured a unique 421 cu in (6.9 L) "2+2 V8". Identifying the 2+2 was by the louvers that were incorporated into the bodywork. Standard features included heavy-duty springs and shock absorbers, a 3-speed synchromesh manual transmission (a 4-speed with a Hurst shifter was optional), dual exhausts, and a performance axle ratio of 3.42:1. A new Turbo-Hydramatic automatic transmission replaced the Hydramatic. Car and Driver (March 1965) tested a modified Catalina 428 and recorded a top speed of 130 mph (210 km/h) and a 0-60 time of 3.9 seconds.

Model year	Engine name	Displacement	Carburetor series (bbl)	Output at rpm	Torque at rpm
1965-66	2+2 V8	421 cu in (6.9 L)	Carter C4-AFB (4)	338 hp (252 kW; 343 PS) at 4600	459 lb⋅ft (622 N⋅m) at 2800
1965-66	2+2 V8	421 cu in (6.9 L)	Rochester 2-G (2) x3	356 hp (265 kW; 361 PS) at 4800	459 lb⋅ft (622 N⋅m) at 3200
1965-66	2+2 HO V8	421 cu in (6.9 L)	Rochester 2-G (2) x3	376 hp (280 kW; 381 PS) at 5000	461 lb⋅ft (625 N⋅m) at 3600
1967	2+2 V8	428 cu in (7.0 L)	Rochester Q-Jet (4)	360 hp (268 kW; 365 PS) at 4600	472 lb⋅ft (640 N⋅m) at 3200
1967	Quadra-Power 428	428 cu in (7.0 L)	Rochester Q-Jet (4)	376 hp (280 kW; 381 PS) at 5100	462 lb⋅ft (626 N⋅m) at 3400

== Canadian 2+2 ==
In 1967, GM of Canada debuted the Parisienne 2+2, based on the Parisienne series that replaced the Parisienne Custom Sport from a year earlier. All Pontiacs manufactured and sold in Canada up until and including 1970 were unique from their U.S. counterparts as GM of Canada designed Pontiacs for the Canadian market based on the G.M. B Platform and chassis with Pontiac exterior sheet metal. Canadian purchasers of the 2+2 could order any Chevrolet V8 engine option like the 283 and 327 in³ small-block engines, or the 396 and 427 in³ "Mark IV" big-block. The trim options were slightly different as well, with Chevrolet's 15-inch Rally wheels were used instead of standard 14-inch steel wheels or the optional Pontiac Motor Division's Kelsey-Hayes "8-lug" integral wheel/brake-drum sets. A 250 cu in (4.1 L) 155 hp (116 kW; 157 PS) straight-six engine was standard in 1967, which meant that the Canadian 2+2 was a Parisienne with louvers, exterior and interior badges, as well as bucket seats and center console (which were options on the Parisienne) as standard equipment.

=== 1967-70 ===
Model year	Engine name	Displacement	Carburetor series (bbl)	Output at rpm	Torque at rpm
1967	Astro-6 I-6	250 cu in (4.1 L)	Rochester 2-G (1)	155 hp (116 kW; 157 PS) at 4200	235 lb⋅ft (319 N⋅m) at 1600
1967	Astro-Flash	283 cu in (4.6 L)	Rochester 2-G (2)	195 hp (145 kW; 198 PS) at 4800	NA
1967-68	Astro-Jet	396 cu in (6.5 L)	Rochester Q-Jet (4)	325 hp (242 kW; 330 PS) at 4800	400 lb⋅ft (542 N⋅m) at 2800
1967-69	Astro-Flash	427 cu in (7.0 L)	Rochester Q-Jet (4)	385 hp (287 kW; 390 PS) at 4800	470 lb⋅ft (637 N⋅m) at 3200
1968-70	Astro-Flash	350 cu in (5.7 L)	Rochester Q-Jet (4)	300 hp (224 kW; 304 PS) at 4800	380 lb⋅ft (515 N⋅m) at 2800
1969	Astro-Jet	396 cu in (6.5 L)	Rochester Q-Jet (4)	265 hp (198 kW; 269 PS) at 4800	400 lb⋅ft (542 N⋅m) at 2800
1969	Astro-Jet	427 cu in (7.0 L)	Rochester Q-Jet (4)	390 hp (291 kW; 395 PS) at 5400	NA
1970	Astro-Jet	400 cu in (6.6 L)	Rochester Q-Jet (4)	240 hp (179 kW; 243 PS) at 4800	NA
1970	Astro-Jet	454 cu in (7.4 L)	Rochester Q-Jet (4)	345 hp (257 kW; 350 PS) at 4800	500 lb⋅ft (678 N⋅m) at 2800
