= Pontiac Executive =

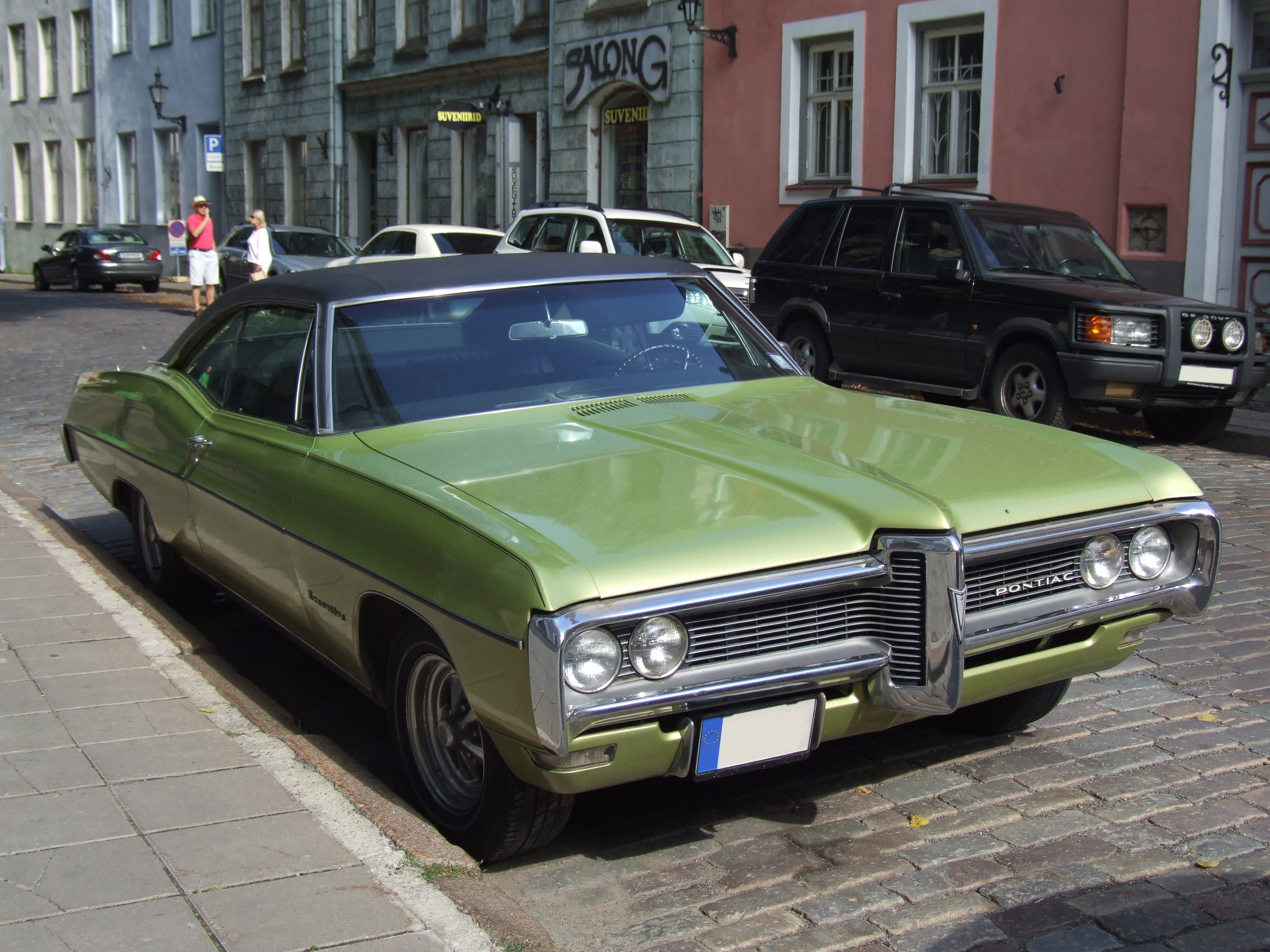
- 1968 Pontiac Executive Hardtop Coupe (with non-standard wheels)

Overview
- Manufacturer: Pontiac (General Motors)
- Production: Star Chief Executive: 1966 only Executive: 1967 to 1970
- Assembly: (main plant); Pontiac, Michigan, United States (Pontiac Assembly) (branch assembly); Kansas City, Kansas, United States (Fairfax Assembly); Linden, New Jersey, United States (Linden Assembly); South Gate, California, United States (South Gate Assembly)

Body and chassis
- Class: Full-size
- Body style: 2-door hardtop 4-door hardtop 4-door sedan 4-door station wagon
- Platform: B-body

Powertrain
- Engine: 400 cu in (6.6 L) Pontiac V8; 428 cu in (7.0 L) Pontiac V8; 455 cu in (7.5 L) Pontiac V8
- Transmission: 3-speed manual 4-speed manual 3-speed TH-400 automatic

Dimensions
- Wheelbase: 1965-68: 124 in (3,150 mm); 1969-70: 125 in (3,175 mm)
- Length: 1965-68: 222.6 in (5,654 mm); 1969-70: 223.5 in (5,677 mm)
- Width: 79.7 in (2,024 mm)

Chronology
- Predecessor: Pontiac Star Chief
- Successor: Pontiac Bonneville (1971)

The Pontiac Executive is an automobile model that was produced by Pontiac from 1967 to 1970.

The Executive name replaced Pontiac's long running mid-range Star Chief, beginning for 1966 when all Pontiacs in this range were named Star Chief Executive for this one year only, before the series became simply the Executive for 1967. Executives featured more deluxe trim, more standard amenities and a longer wheelbase and overall length than the lower-priced Catalina models, but were not quite as luxurious as the top-line Bonneville, whose wheelbase and other dimensions the Executive shared.

Mechanically, the Executive was virtually identical to the Catalina, sharing similar standard and optional V8 engines starting with the base 400 CID V8 with two-barrel carburetor rated at 265 hp (198 kW), and ending with a 390 hp 428 CID HO V8 through 1969 and a larger 455 CID V8 rated at 370 hp (276 kW) in 1970. The standard transmission each year was a three-speed manual with column shift, with a floor-mounted four-speed with Hurst shifter optional in 1967 and 1968. However, 98 percent of Executives were equipped with the three-speed Turbo Hydra-Matic automatic during the model's four-year run.

Executives were available as a four-door pillared sedan, two-door hardtop coupe, four-door hardtop sedan, and Safari station wagons in two and three-seat versions. The Executive Safari wagons differed from the Catalina and Bonneville Safari wagons by featuring simulated wood paneling. No Executive convertibles were offered.

Total output of the Executive was:

- 1967: 35,491 units
- 1968: 32,597 units
- 1969: 25,845 units
- 1970: 21,936 units

Through its four years, the Executive was the lowest-volume full-size Pontiac. It was replaced for 1971 by the Pontiac Bonneville.

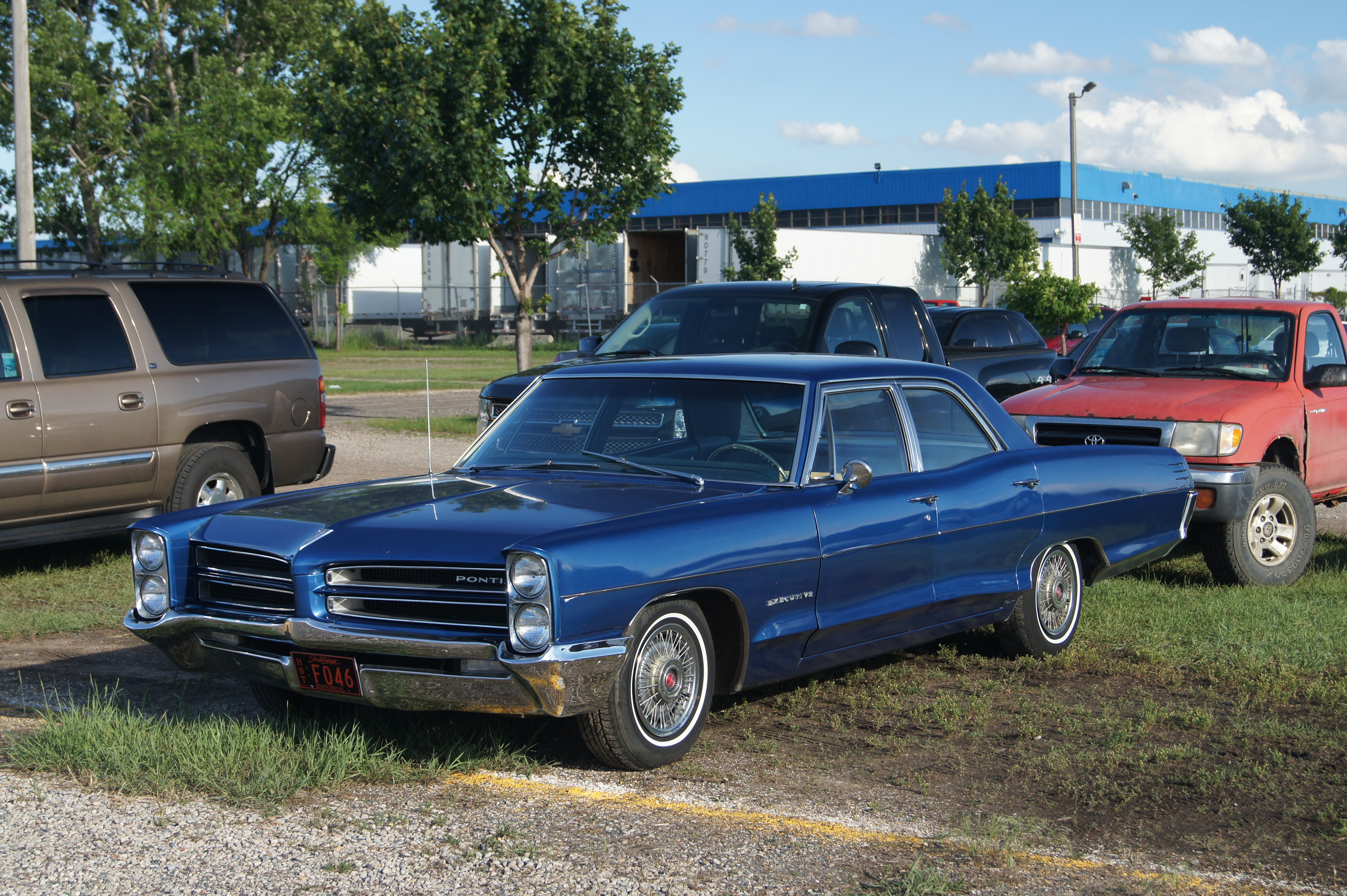
1966 Pontiac Star Chief Executive 4-Door Sedan

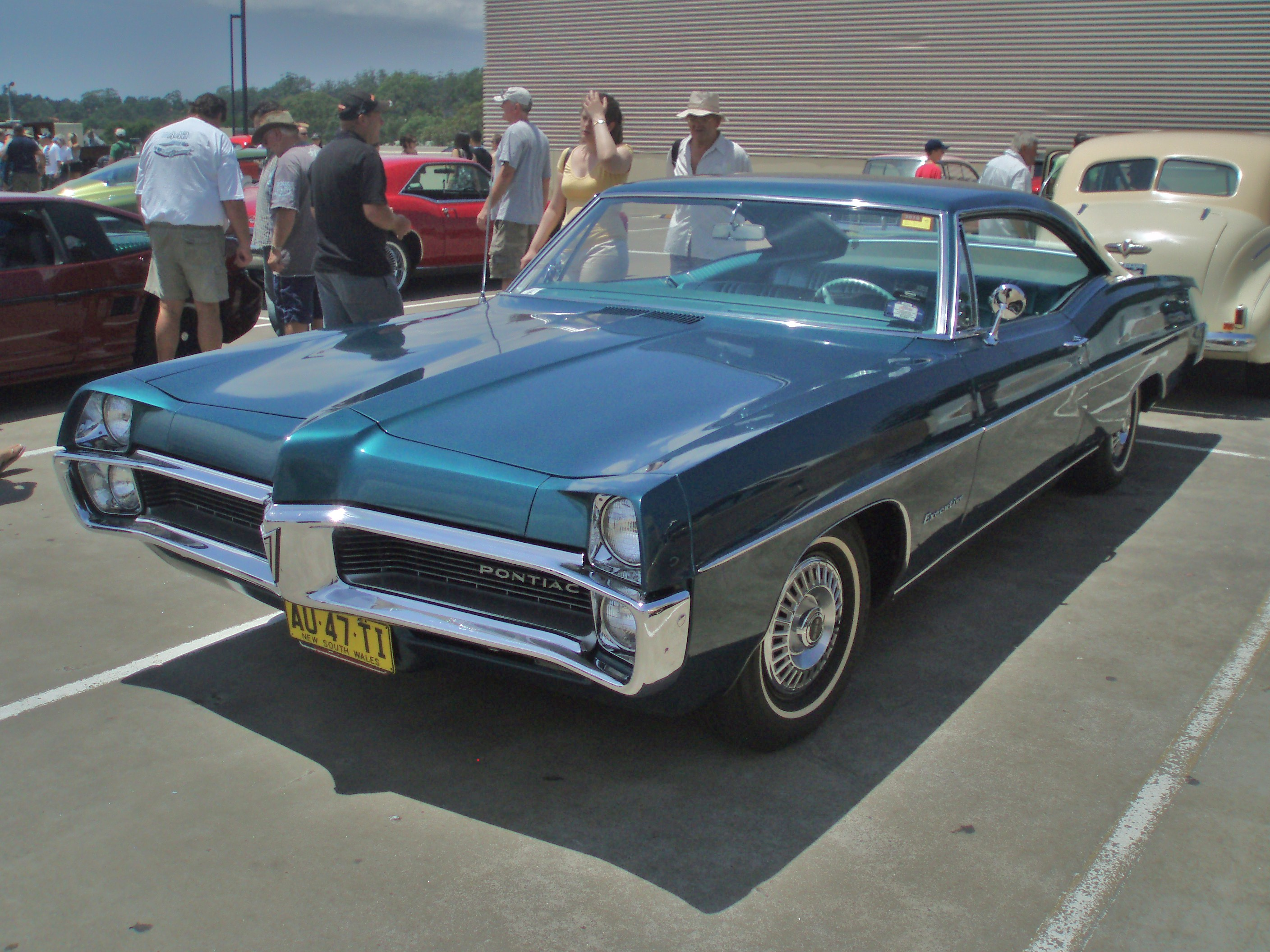
1967 Pontiac Executive Hardtop Coupe

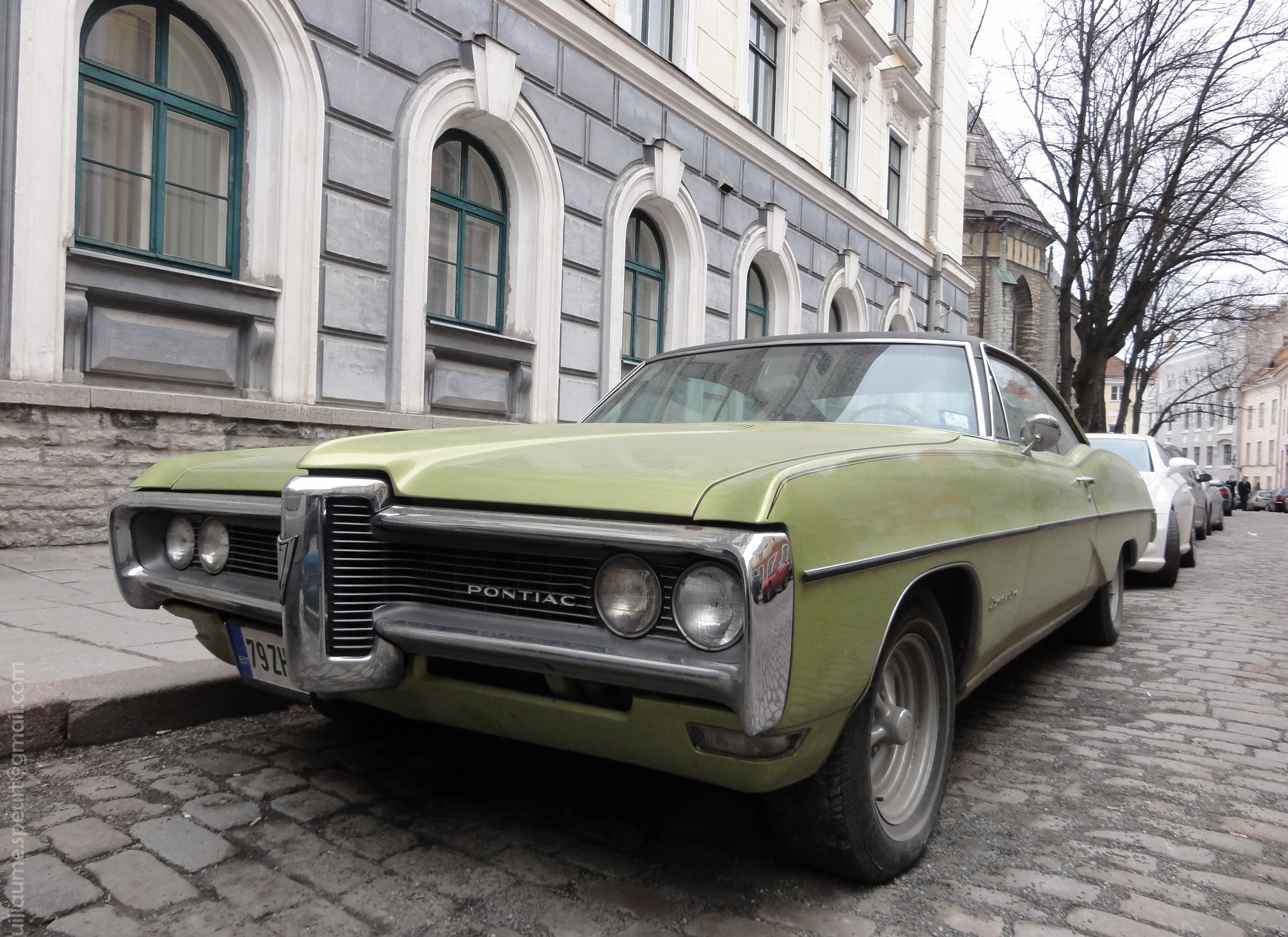
1968 Pontiac Executive Hardtop Coupe
(with non-standard wheels)
