= Pontiac Star Chief =

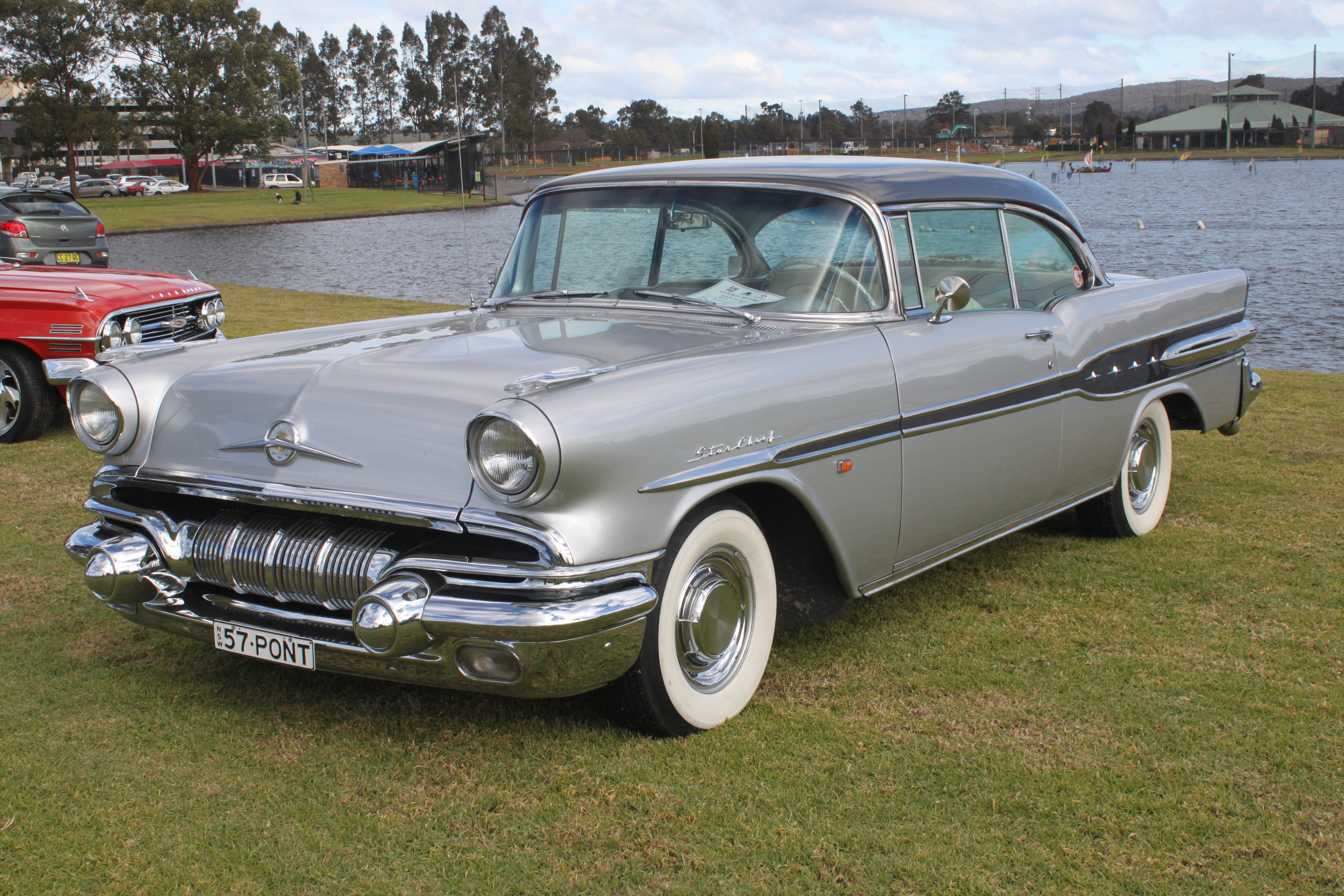
- 1957 Pontiac Star Chief

Overview
- Manufacturer: Pontiac (General Motors)
- Production: 1954–1966

Body and chassis
- Class: Full-size
- Layout: FR layout

Chronology
- Predecessor: Pontiac Streamliner
- Successor: Pontiac Executive

The Pontiac Star Chief is an automobile model that was manufactured by Pontiac between 1954 and 1966. It was Pontiac's top trim package on the Pontiac Chieftain, with later generations built on longer wheelbases, and serving as the foundation platform for the Pontiac Bonneville. The car was easily identified by three and four star-like trim features along varying areas of the car, a feature all Star Chiefs were equipped with star arrangements.

== First generation (1954) ==
First generation
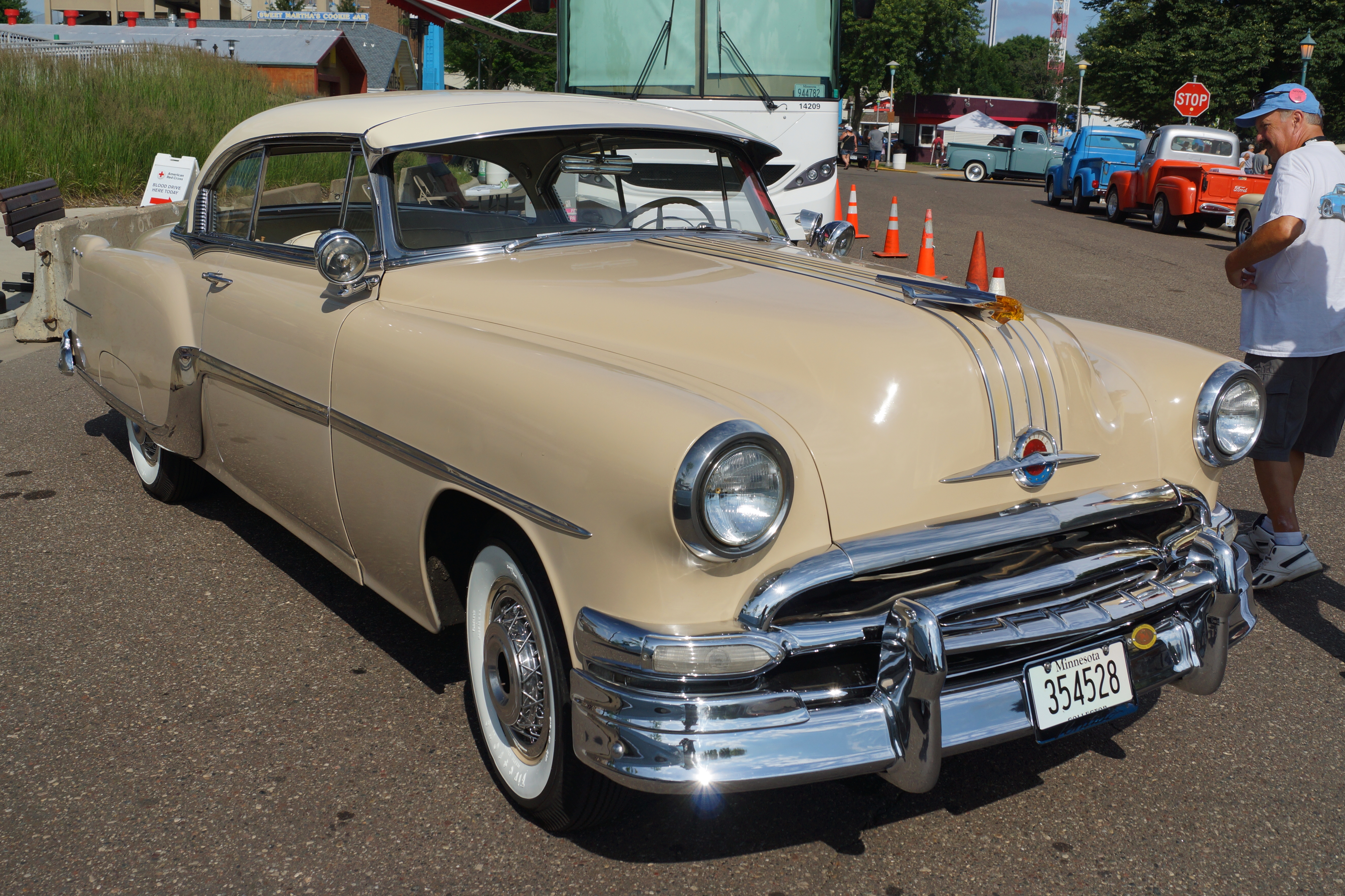
- 1954 Star Chief Custom Catalina

Overview
- Model years: 1954
- Assembly: (main plant); Pontiac, Michigan, United States (Pontiac Assembly) (branch assembly); Framingham, Massachusetts, United States (Framingham Assembly); Kansas City, Kansas, United States (Fairfax Assembly); Linden, New Jersey, United States (Linden Assembly); Wilmington, Delaware, United States (Wilmington Assembly)

Body and chassis
- Body style: 2-door hardtop 2-door convertible 4-door sedan
- Platform: A-body
- Related: Pontiac Chieftain; Pontiac Strato-Streak; Chevrolet Bel Air

Powertrain
- Engine: 268 cu in (4.39 L) straight-eight I8

Dimensions
- Wheelbase: 1954: 124 in (3,100 mm); Other Pontiacs: 1949-51: 120.0 in (3,050 mm); 1952-54: 122.0 in (3,100 mm)
- Length: 1954: 213 in (5,400 mm); Other Pontiacs: 1949-51: 5,143.5 mm (202.50 in); 1952: 5,143.5 mm (202.50 in); 1953–1954: 5,149.85 mm (202.750 in)
- Width: 75.8 in (1,925 mm)(1949–1952); 76.6 in (1,946 mm)"(1953–1954)

Between 1954 and 1957, the Star Chief was Pontiac's prestige model and was based on the Pontiac Chieftain. In 1954, Pontiac also introduced air conditioning with all the components under the hood, a first for the price range. Seat belts were added as options in 1956. The Star Chief was available in Deluxe and pricier Custom trim, with the top trim level hardtop called the Catalina. Three chrome star markings were featured on the rear fender in 1954.

Prior to the introduction of the Star Chief, all US Pontiacs had shared a 122 inch wheelbase (309.9 cm) and used a modified version of Chevrolet's A platform. The introduction of this new premier model in 1954 was the first application of the longer 123.5 inch (313.7 cm) wheelbase of the junior Oldsmobiles and Buicks to the Pontiac division. The car was still on the A platform, but with 11 in (28 cm) added towards the rear of the frame. Power the first year came from Pontiac's venerable straight eight engine, with the six-cylinder not available. The eight produced 127 hp (95 kW) in the Star Chief, five more than when fitted to other Pontiacs.

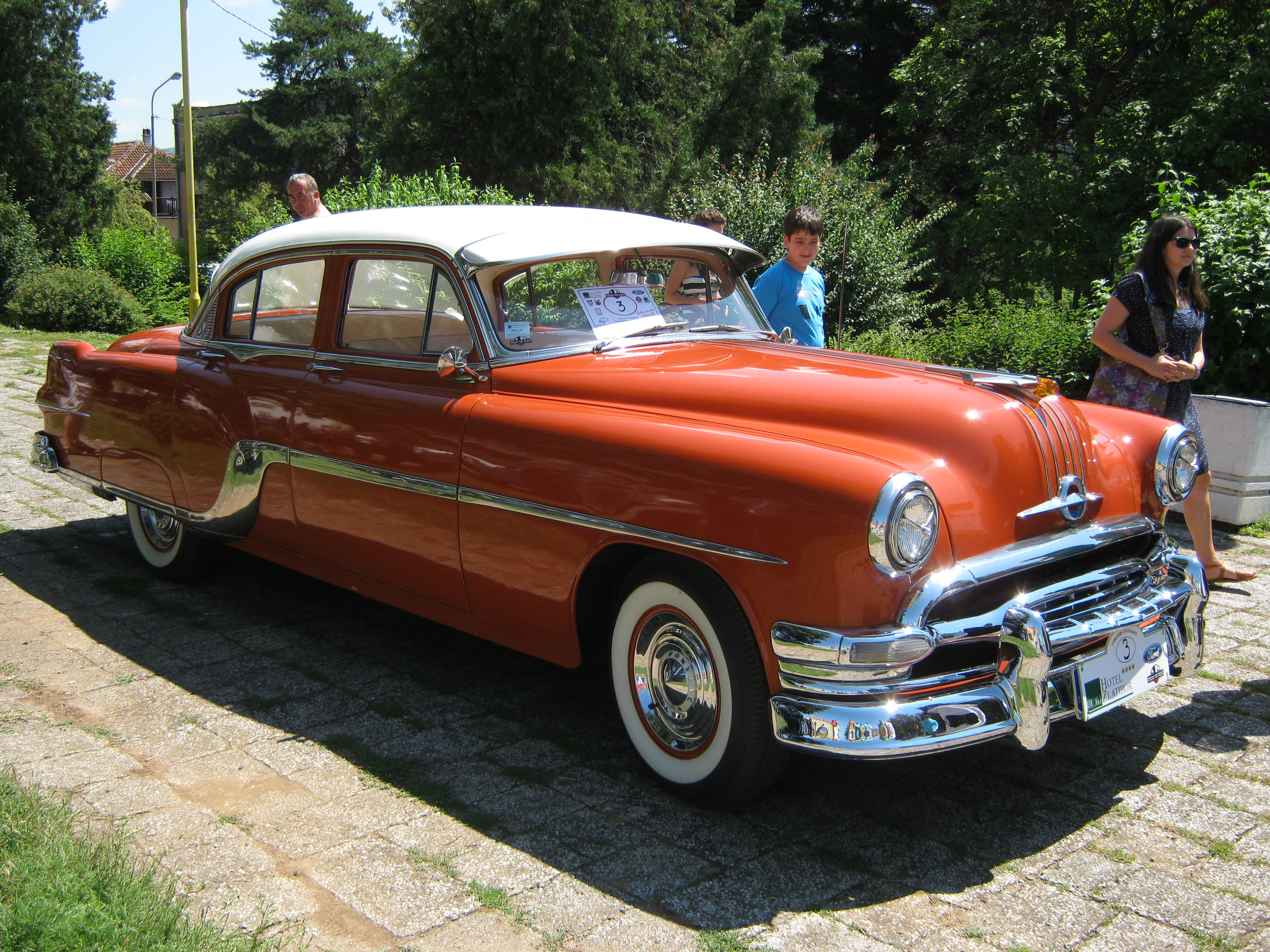
1954 Pontiac Star Chief Four-Door Sedan

== Second generation (1955-1957) ==
Second generation
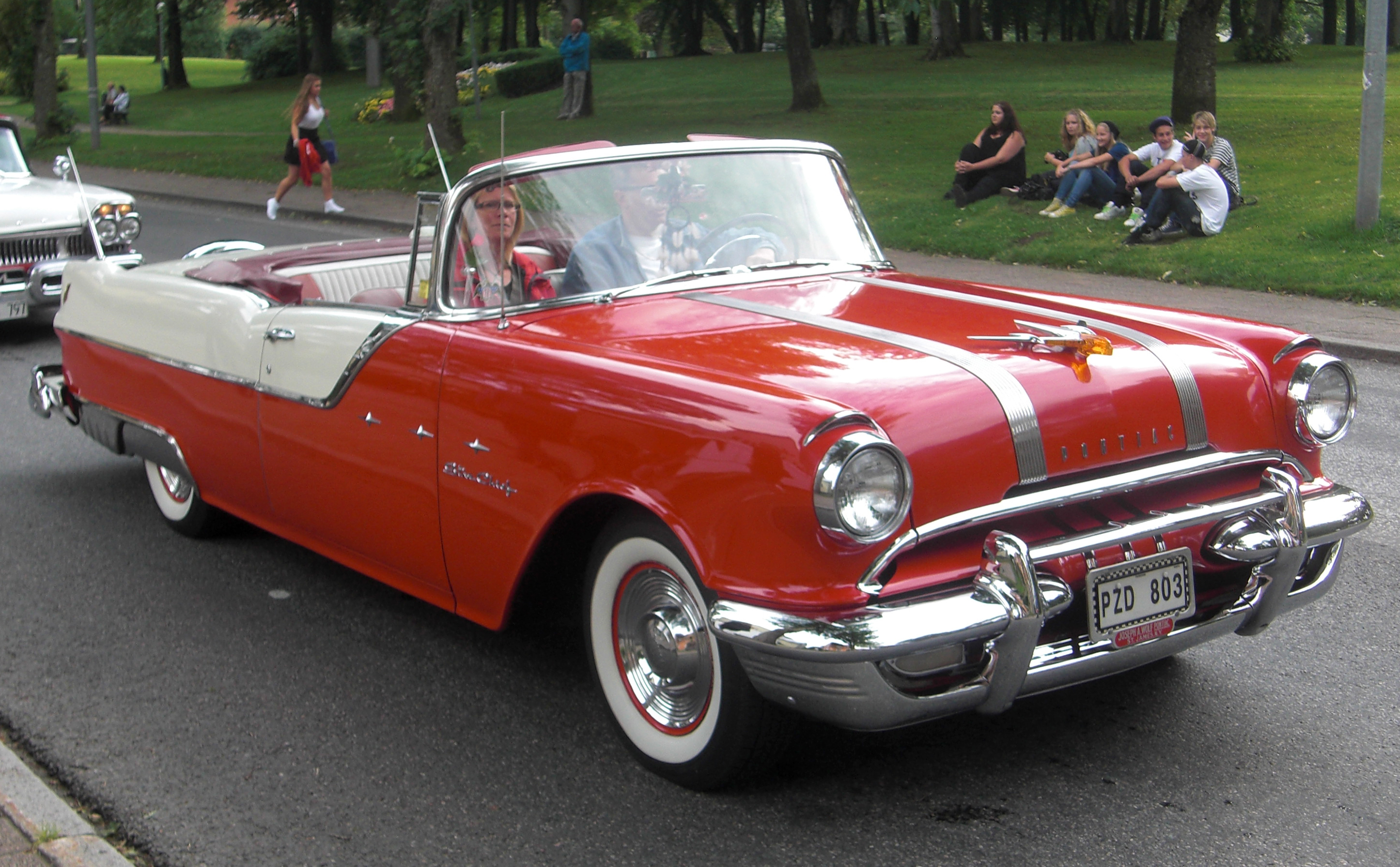
- 1955 Star Chief convertible

Overview
- Model years: 1955–1957
- Assembly: (main plant); Pontiac, Michigan, United States (Pontiac Assembly) (branch assembly); Arlington, Texas, United States (Arlington Assembly); Doraville, Georgia, United States (Doraville Assembly) "Atlanta"; Framingham, Massachusetts, United States (Framingham Assembly); Kansas City, Kansas, United States (Fairfax Assembly); Linden, New Jersey, United States (Linden Assembly); South Gate, California, United States (South Gate Assembly); Wilmington, Delaware, United States (Wilmington Assembly)

Body and chassis
- Body style: 2-door hardtop 2-door convertible 2-door station wagon 4-door station wagon 4-door sedan 4-door hardtop
- Platform: A-body
- Related: Pontiac Chieftain; Chevrolet Bel Air

Powertrain
- Engine: 287 cu in (4.7 L) Strato Streak V8 (1955); 316.6 cu in (5.2 L) V8 (1956); 347 cu in (5.7 L) V8 (1957)
- Transmission: 3-speed manual 3-speed Strato-Flight Hydra-Matic

Dimensions
- Wheelbase: 124 in (3,100 mm)
- Length: 213.7 in (5,430 mm)
- Width: 76.6 in (1,950 mm)
- Curb weight: 3,860 lb (1,750 kg)

Along with an all-new body, the straight-eight was superseded by the new Strato Streak V-8 power in 1955. Typical for the 1955 Pontiacs is the design with two wide "Silver Streaks" running the length of the hood. The hood ornament “Indian” was amber plastic that lit up when the headlights were turned on. Also for 1955, the new Star Chief Safari two door hardtop wagon, which was similar to Chevrolet's Bel Air Nomad, was introduced, shared with the Pontiac Chieftain. This variant lasted through 1957; after that the Safari name was used for all of the division's standard four door wagons. The Safari was introduced on January 31, 1955, over three months behind the rest of the 1955s. Prices listed for the Star Chief averaged at US$2,594 ($31,176 in 2025 dollars) and 203,404 were recorded to have been manufactured in 1955.

When the storyline of I Love Lucy pointed towards a Hollywood setting in the 1954–1955 season, the characters drove (in episode 110, "California Here We Come") to the West Coast in a red on white 1955 Star Chief convertible, that in the previous episode "Lucy Learns to Drive" was "bumped together" with a 1922 Cadillac Type V-63. Several subsequent episodes in the "Hollywood" arc also showed the vehicle. General Motors was a sponsor of the show and the Pontiac was used several times for product placement.

The Safari was not quite part of the Star Chief line, as it sat on the shorter Chieftain 122 in (3,100 mm) wheelbase. It was officially part of the "27 series", whereas the longer Star Chief received the "28 series" designation. In January 1957, some time after the rest of the new models, the four-door "Custom Safari Transcontinental" station wagon was introduced.

For 1956 the design was lightly revised, with heavier looking bumpers and a vertical slash on the front door above the swage line. In 1957, the high performance Star Chief Custom Bonneville was introduced as part of its divisional head's push to raise the marque out of the doldrums. The silver streaks running down the hood were dropped for the new "Star Flight" design. All gauges were placed in an oval on the dash and the side trim had a missile-shaped spear behind the front door. Three chrome star markings were featured on the front doors to front fenders in 1955. Three chrome star markings were featured on the trunk lid including continental kit if fitted, for 1956. Four chrome star markings were featured on the rear fender. in 1957.

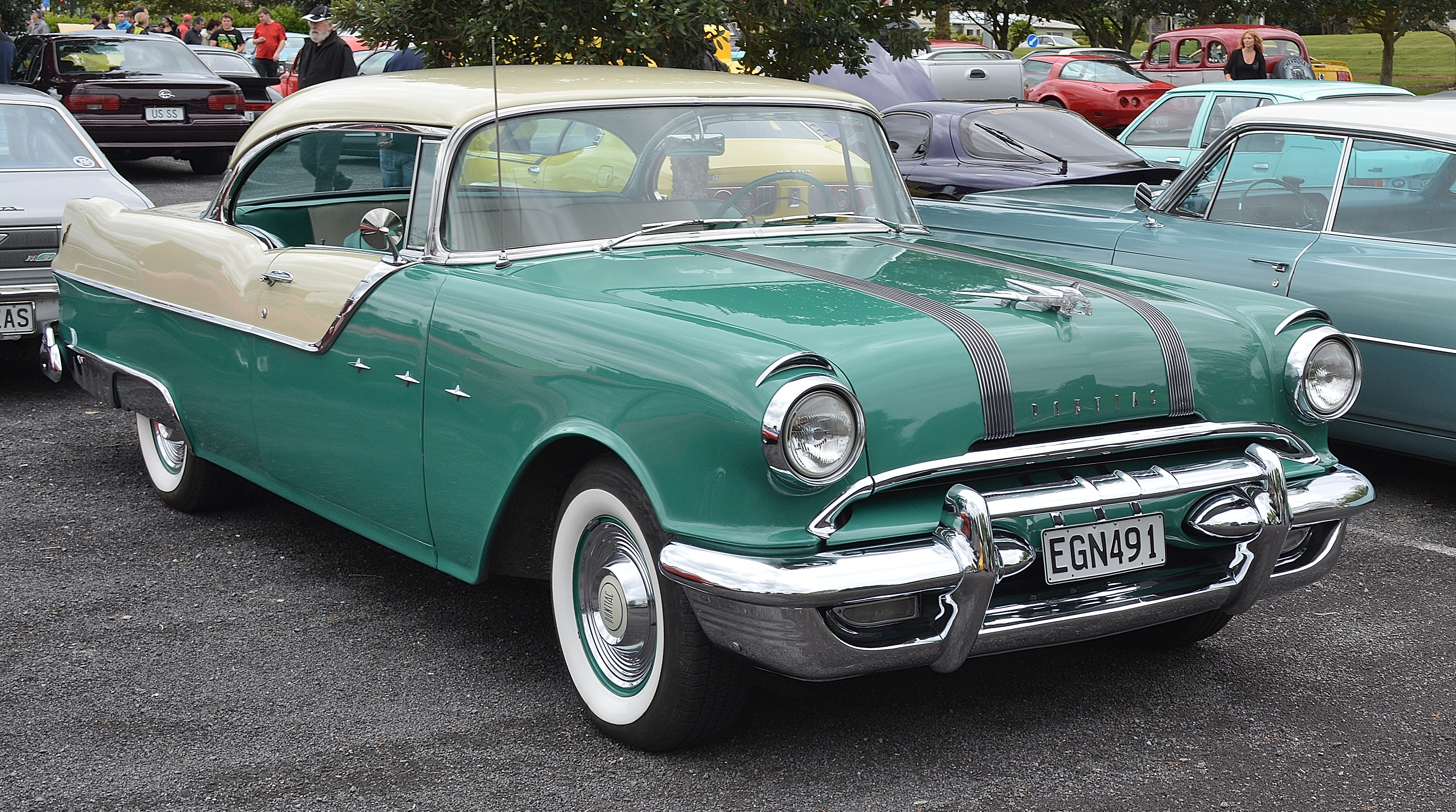
1955 Pontiac Star Chief Custom Catalina

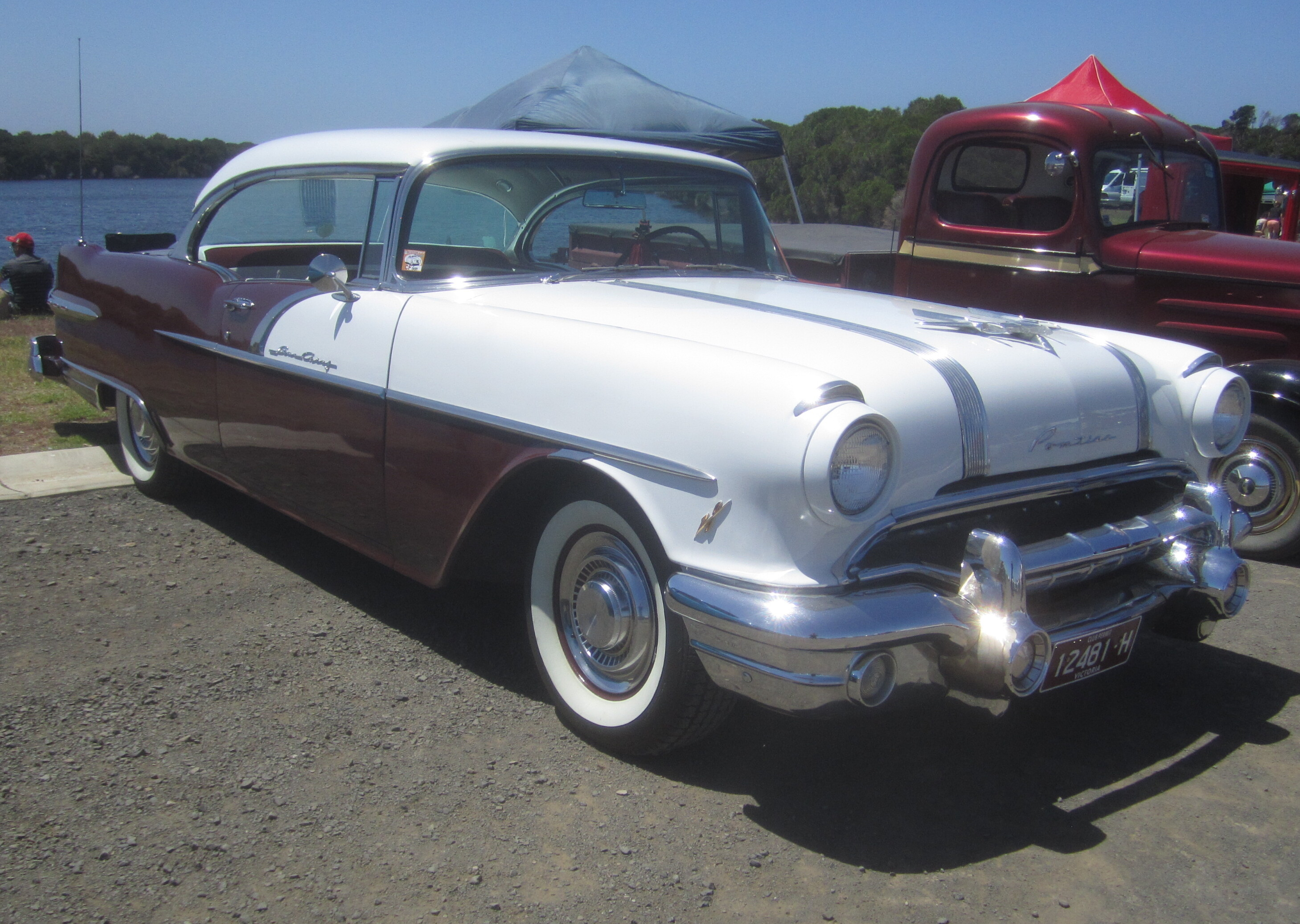
1956 Pontiac Star Chief Two-door Catalina

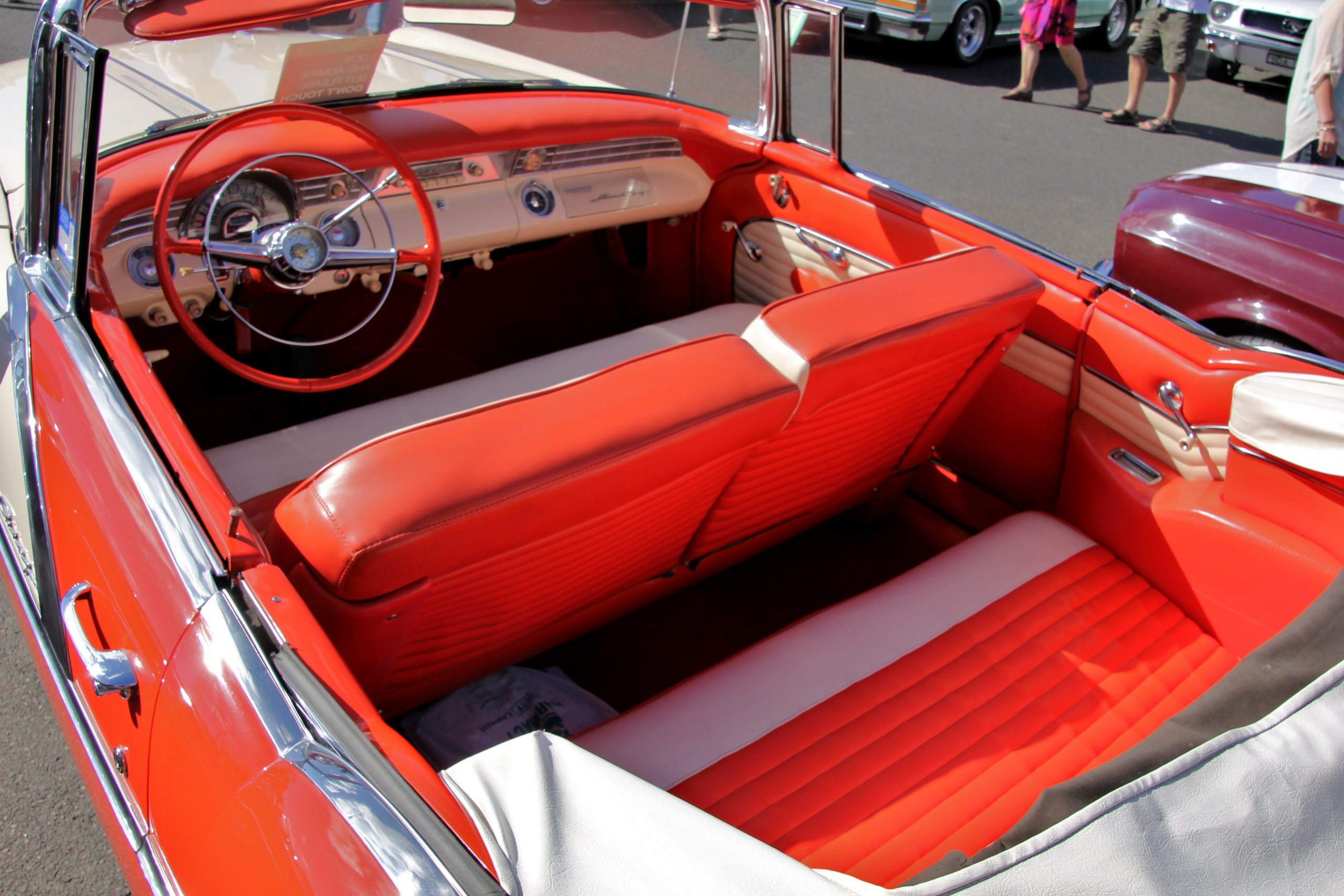
1956 Pontiac Star Chief convertible interior

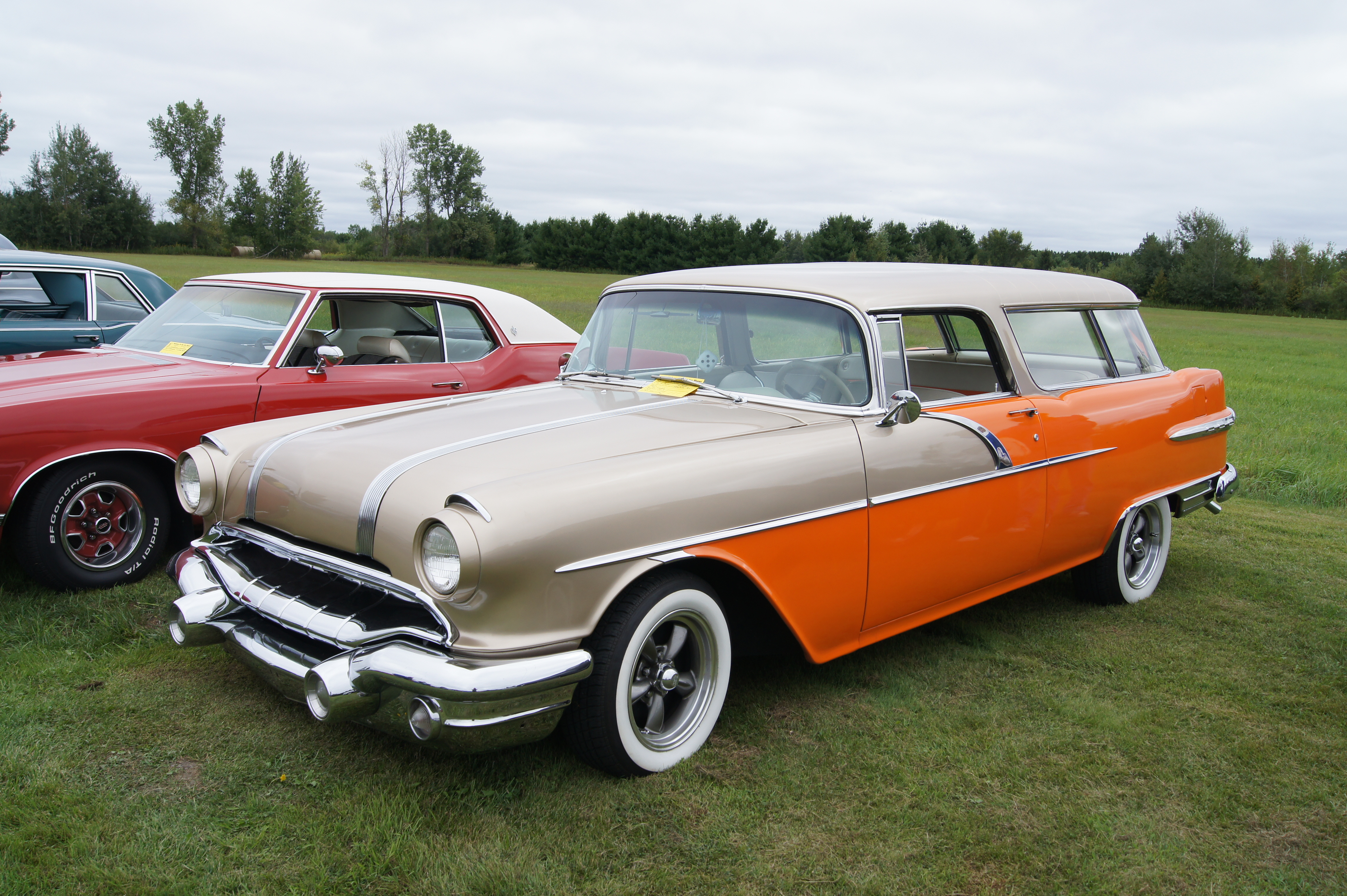
1956 Pontiac Star Chief Safari

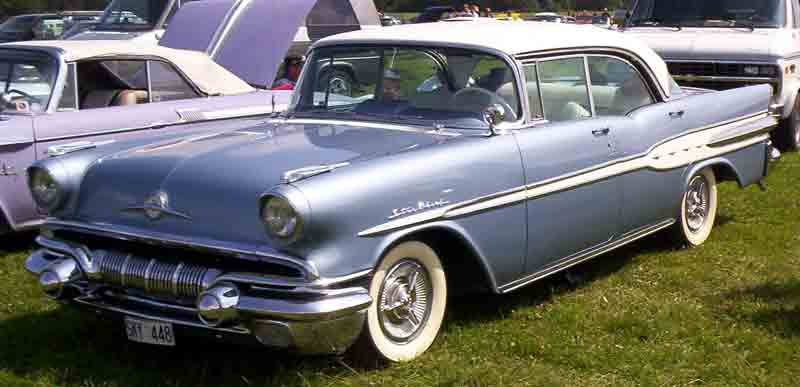
1957 Pontiac Star Chief

== Third generation (1958) ==
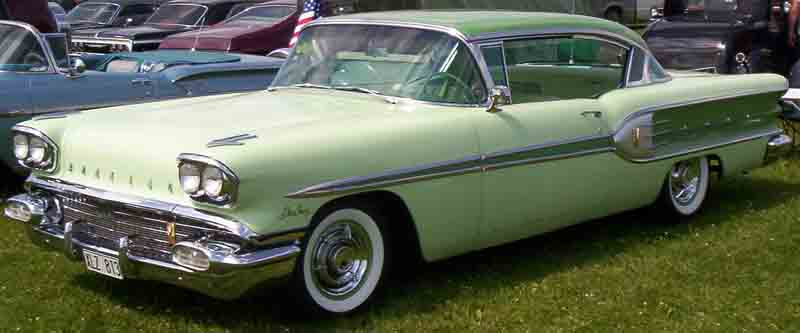
1958 Pontiac Star Chief Catalina 2-door hardtop

Third generation
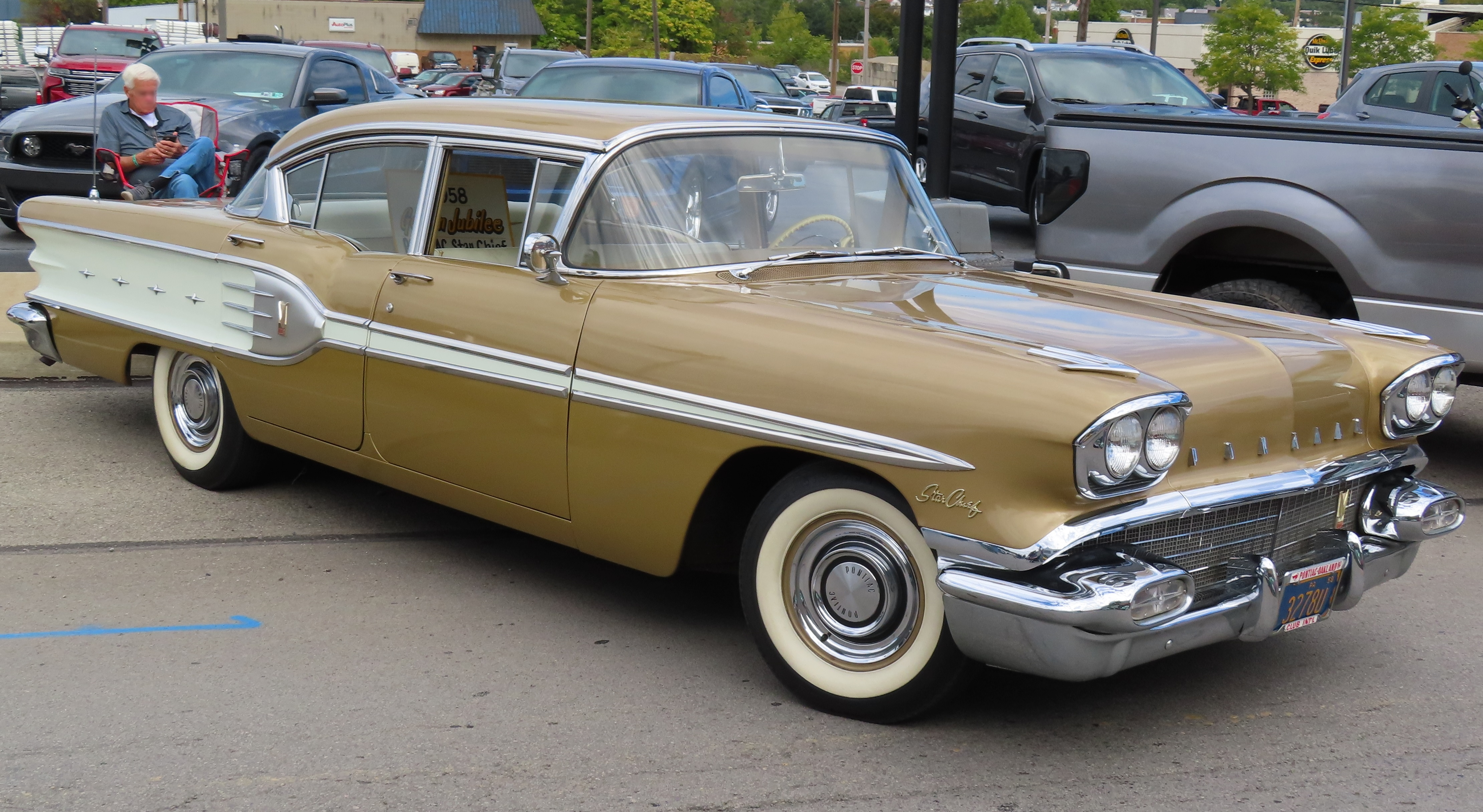
- 1958 Pontiac Star Chief Custom 4-door sedan Golden Jubilee Edition

Overview
- Model years: 1958
- Assembly: (main plant); Pontiac, Michigan, United States (Pontiac Assembly) (branch assembly); Doraville, Georgia, United States (Doraville Assembly) "Atlanta"; Kansas City, Kansas, United States (Fairfax Assembly); South Gate, California, United States (South Gate Assembly); Wilmington, Delaware, United States (Wilmington Assembly)

Body and chassis
- Body style: 2-door hardtop 4-door station wagon 4-door sedan 4-door hardtop
- Layout: FR layout
- Platform: GM B platform
- Related: Pontiac Bonneville; Chevrolet Impala

Dimensions
- Wheelbase: 122 in (3,100 mm) (Safari); 124 in (3,100 mm)
- Width: 77.4 in (1,966 mm)

In 1957, the "Limited Addition" Pontiac Bonneville were sold to customers. They featured Bonneville Badging, Chevy's manual linkage fuel injection systems mounted on Pontiacs 347 cid V-8 engine. The transmission was a Jetaway 4 speed automatic. In 1958, the Bonneville was first given its own position in the Pontiac lineup as the ultimate Pontiac, and was only available as a two-door hardtop and two-door convertible. While no longer Pontiac's prestige model, the Star Chief remained a well-appointed car, and the division's finest four door hardtops and sedans. The 1958 Star Chief received all-new bodywork and an updated chassis with an appearance that was shared with all GM cars for that year. The body was considerably longer and lower, and featured a new honeycomb grille design and twin headlamps. The sedans and coupé models all shared the longer 124 inch wheelbase, while the Custom Safari model remained on a chassis two inches shorter, shared with the lesser Chieftain. Four chrome star markings were featured on the rear fender for 1958. In spite of the new bodywork, sales of the 1958 Star Chief dropped precipitously; down by around 60% while Pontiac's overall sales dropped by more than a third. 1958 was also the year the "Silver Streak" styling feature was no longer offered, which was first used in 1933.

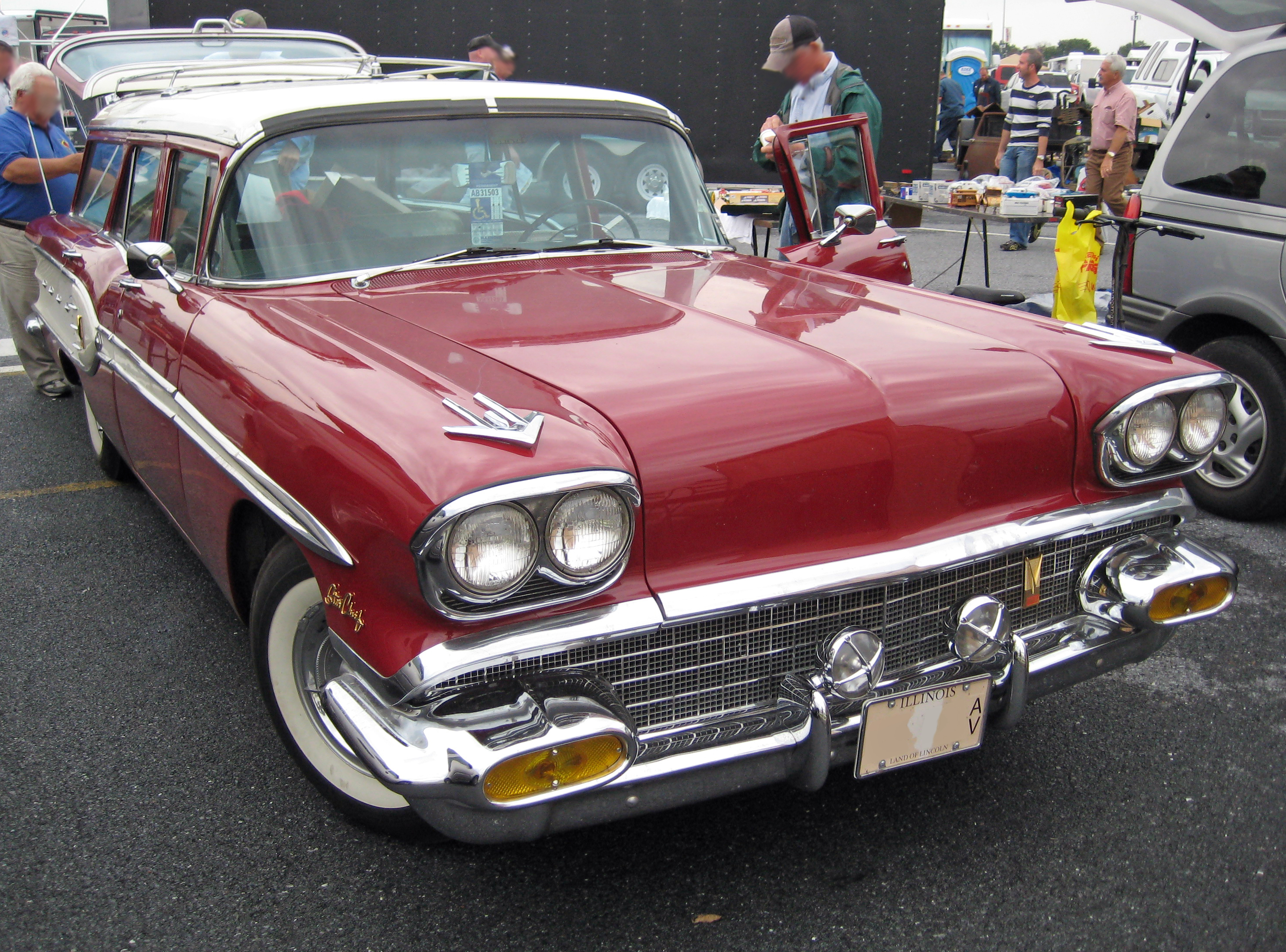
1958 Star Chief Custom Safari (model 2793 SD)

The engine was updated from the 347 cu in (5.7 L) unit used in 1957 to a slightly bored out 370 cu in (6.1 L) version. Power only increased marginally, to 255 hp (190 kW) for the manual version, while the most powerful "PM" option was now up to 330 hp (246 kW).

== Fourth generation (1959-1960) ==
Fourth generation
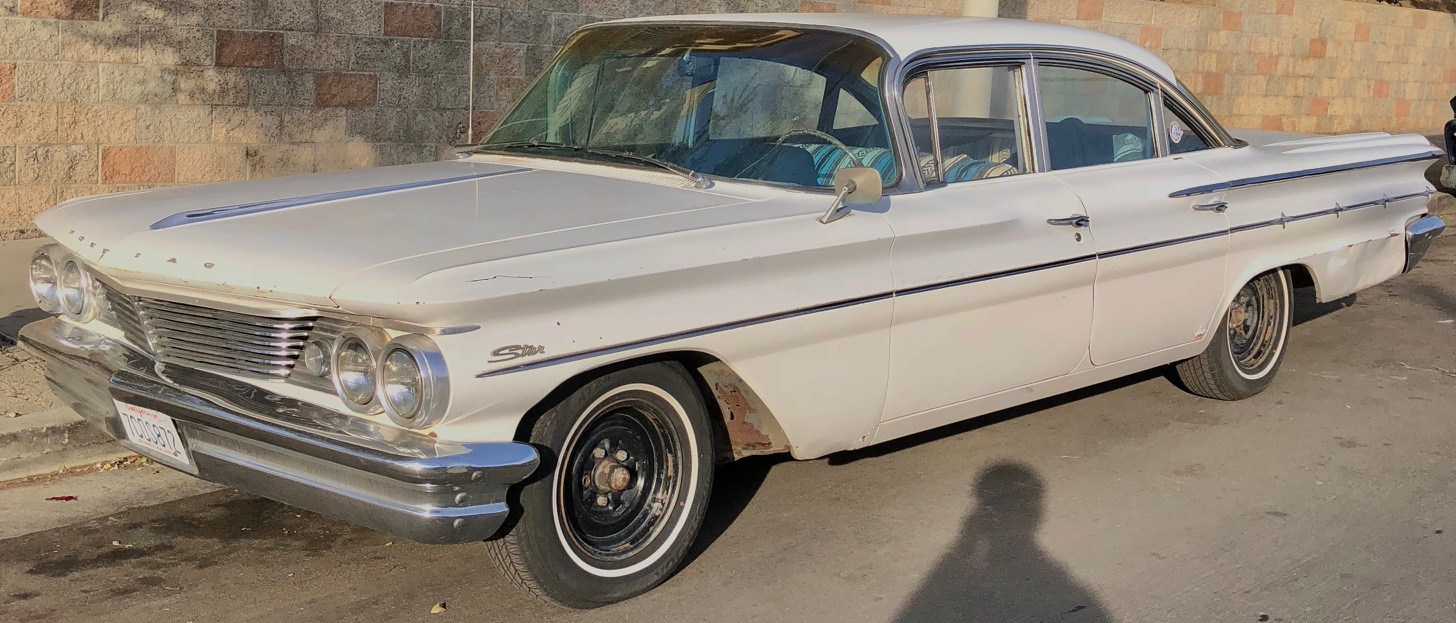
- 1960 Pontiac Star Chief Sedan

Overview
- Model years: 1959-1960
- Assembly: (main plant); Pontiac, Michigan, United States (Pontiac Assembly) (branch assembly); Kansas City, Kansas, United States (Fairfax Assembly); South Gate, California, United States (South Gate Assembly)

Body and chassis
- Body style: 2-door sedan 4-door sedan 4-door hardtop
- Layout: FR layout
- Platform: GM B platform
- Related: Pontiac Bonneville; Chevrolet Impala

Dimensions
- Wheelbase: 124 in (3,150 mm)
- Length: 215.5 in (5,474 mm) (cars); 210.5 in (5,347 mm) (wagons)
- Width: 80 in (2,032 mm)
- Height: 56.4 in (1,433 mm)

In 1959, when the Bonneville gained a full range of body styles, the Star Chief was limited to sedans and hardtops, while the Bonneville and the new Catalina models received the lion's share of Pontiac's attention in the marketplace. In 1959, the Star Chief made 17.97% of Pontiac sales. This was also the first year of the "wide-track" Pontiacs with a front tread width of 63.7 in (1,618 mm) and rear tread width of 64 in (1,626 mm).

In 1960, the new Ventura was introduced, and the Star Chief was thereafter limited to four door sedans and hardtops. This was a novel, but unsuccessful approach. The Star Chief was equipped and powered in a manner similar to the lower-priced, slightly smaller Catalina series.

The Ventura was more lavishly equipped in the manner of the high-line Bonneville, but was available with only two doors and rode the Catalina's slightly shorter wheelbase. This gave sedan buyers of modest means a larger choice than Catalina for only slightly more money, and gave upscale coupe buyers a lighter, sprightlier alternative to the big Bonneville. The Ventura lasted only through 1961, and was replaced by the even sportier new Grand Prix. The Star Chief continued to be available only with four doors through the end of production. Compared to the Catalina, the Star Chief was equipped only very slightly more lavishly; the major additional interior feature was the electric clock. Four chrome star markings were featured on the rear fender both years as they were on the third generation (1957).

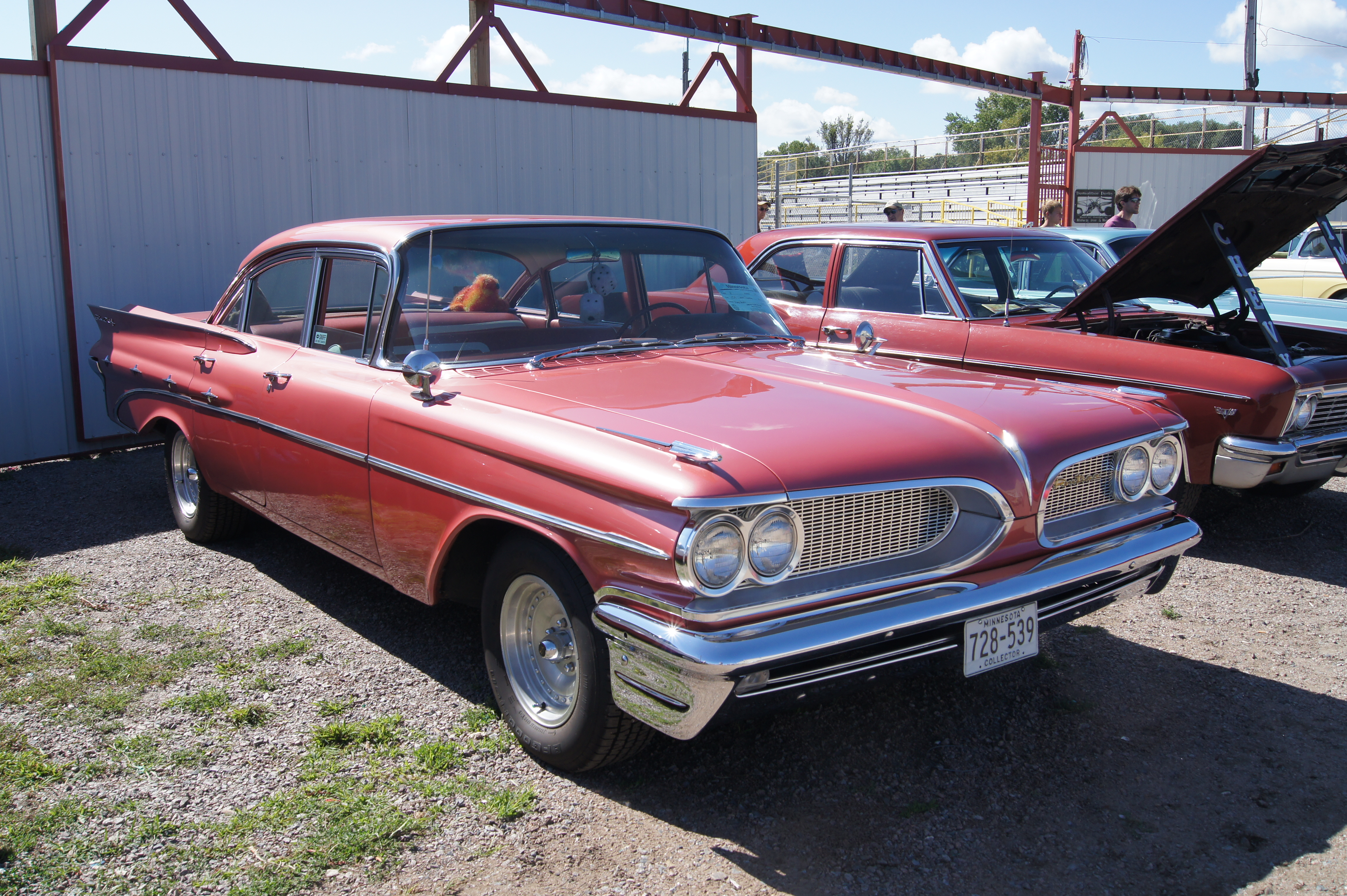
1959 Star Chief

== Fifth generation (1961-1964) ==
Fifth generation
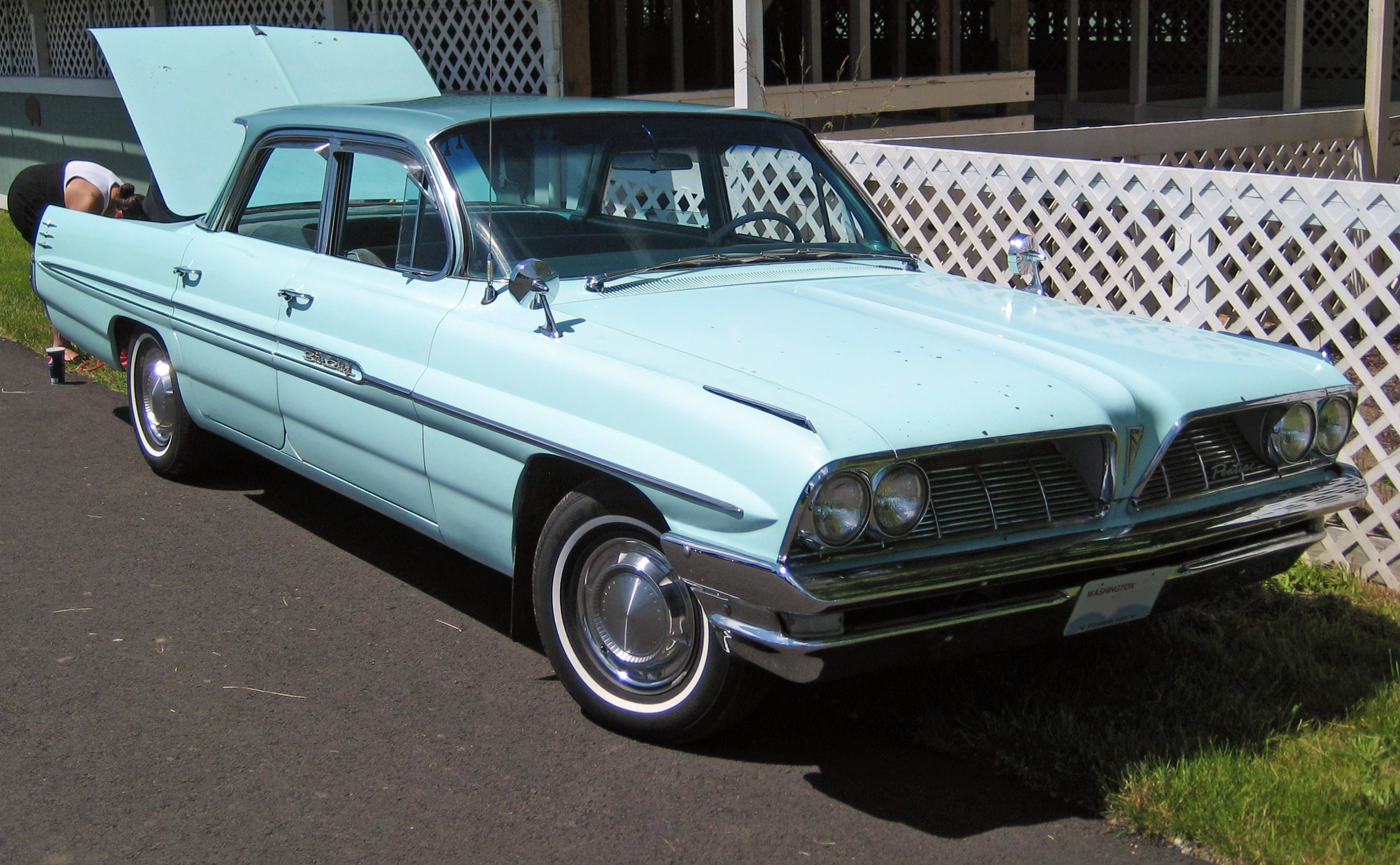
- 1961 Star Chief Sedan

Overview
- Model years: 1961–1964
- Assembly: (main plant); Pontiac, Michigan, United States (Pontiac Assembly) (branch assembly); Doraville, Georgia, United States (Doraville Assembly); Kansas City, Kansas, United States (Fairfax Assembly); South Gate, California, United States (South Gate Assembly)

Body and chassis
- Body style: 4-door sedan 4-door hardtop
- Layout: FR layout
- Platform: B-body
- Related: Pontiac Bonneville; Chevrolet Impala

Dimensions
- Wheelbase: 123 in (3,124 mm)
- Length: 218.6 in (5,552 mm)

For 1962, Pontiac offered a 421 cu in (7 L) Super Duty V8 with two four-barrel carburetors, rated at 405 hp (302 kW), as a US$2,250 option as the base Star Chief listed at US$3,097 ($32,963 in 2025 dollars). A rare option, it was probably never ordered on this somewhat heavy sedan. As in the other Pontiac series, the 4-door hardtop was designated the Star Chief Vista. Bonneville taillights and the three chrome stars on each side continued to distinguish the car from the Catalina. Three chrome star markings were featured on the rear fender for 1961-1962; Three chrome star markings were featured on the roof C-pillar on the 1963 model, and three chrome star markings were featured on the rear fender in 1964, the final production year for the Star Chief. No wagons were offered. All Safari wagons during this period (including the Bonneville Safari) rode the four and a half inch shorter wheelbase shared by Chevrolet and Catalina.

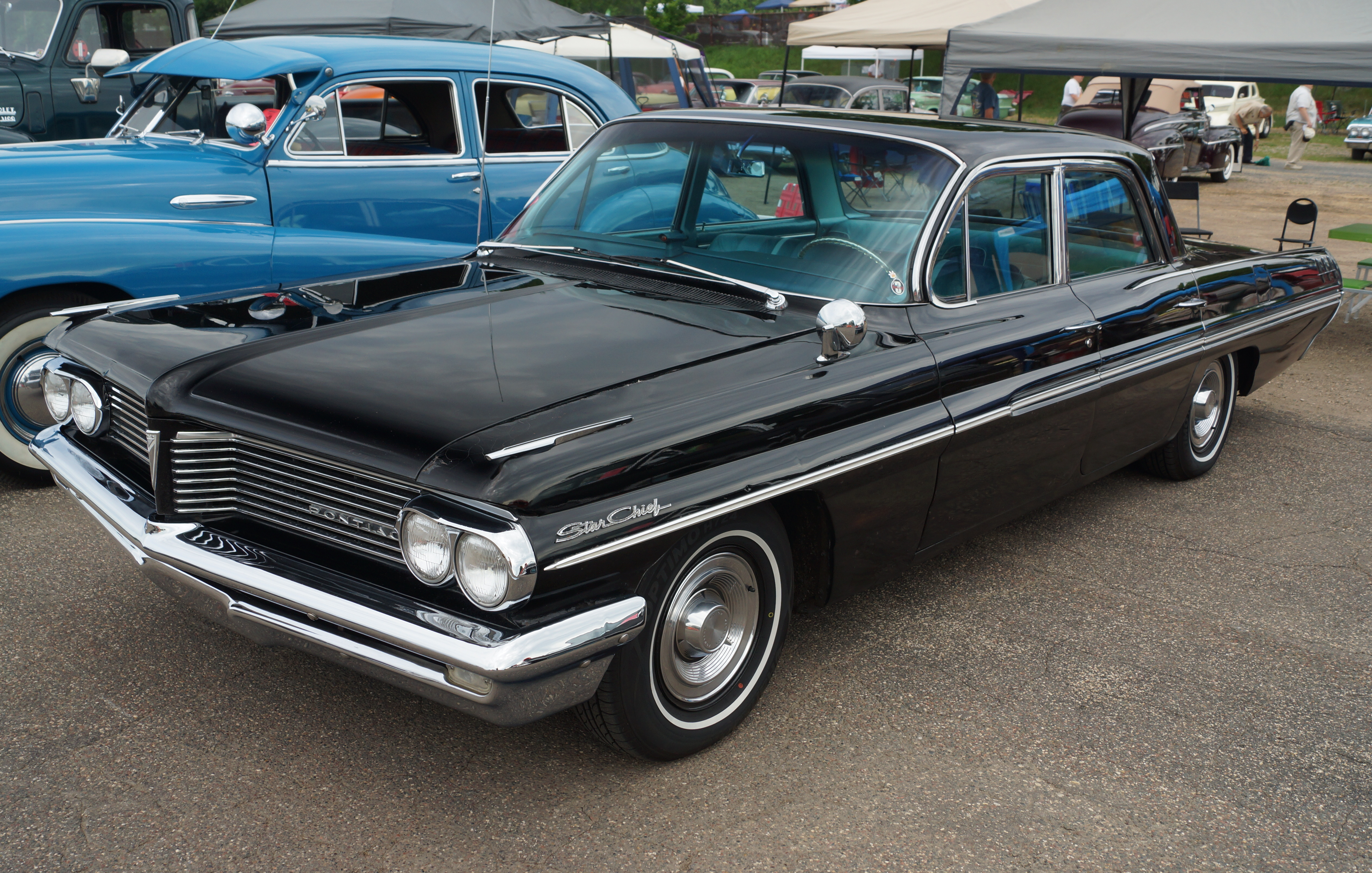
1962 Pontiac Star Chief 4-door Sedan

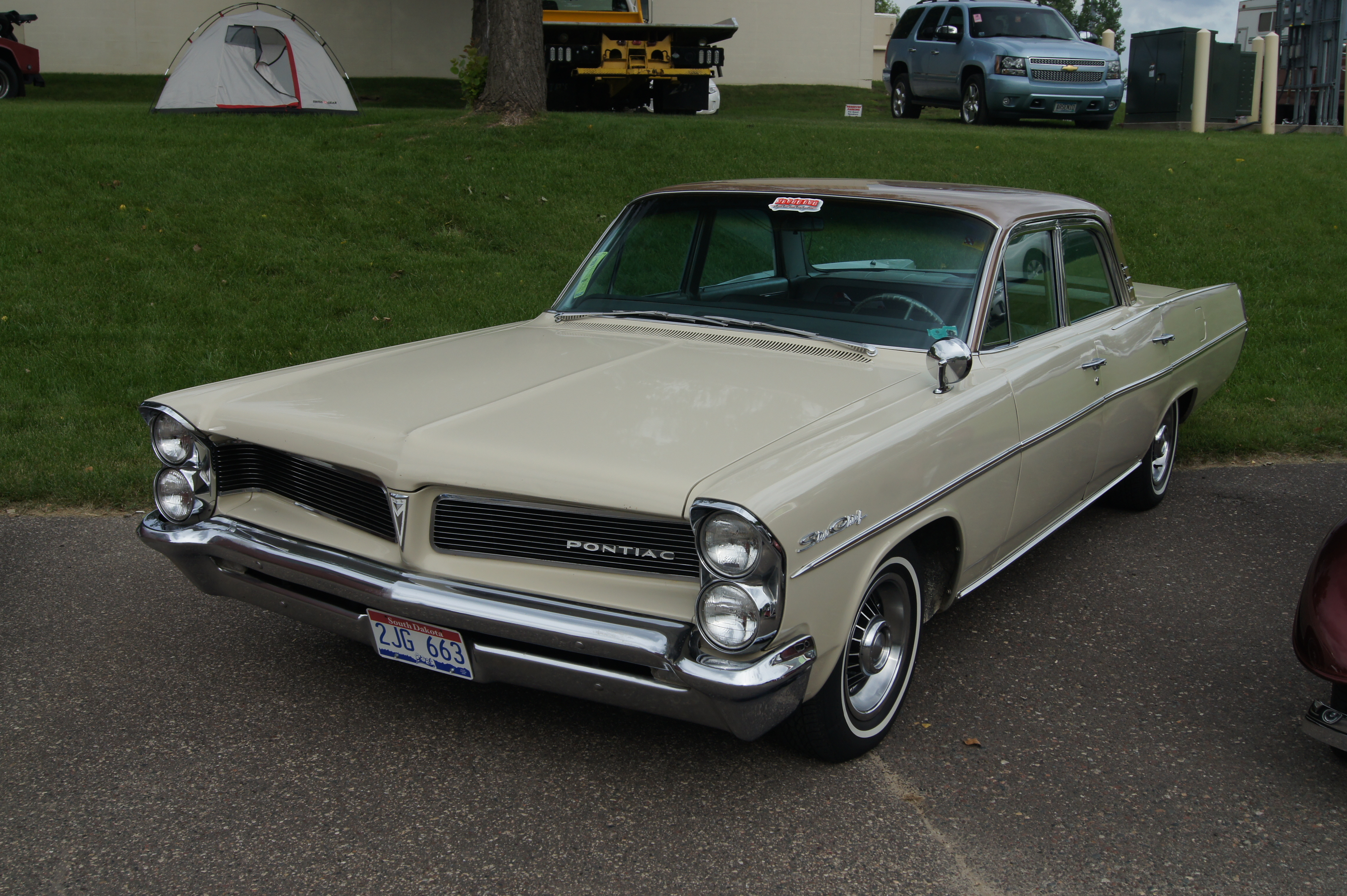
1963 Pontiac Star Chief 4 Door Sedan

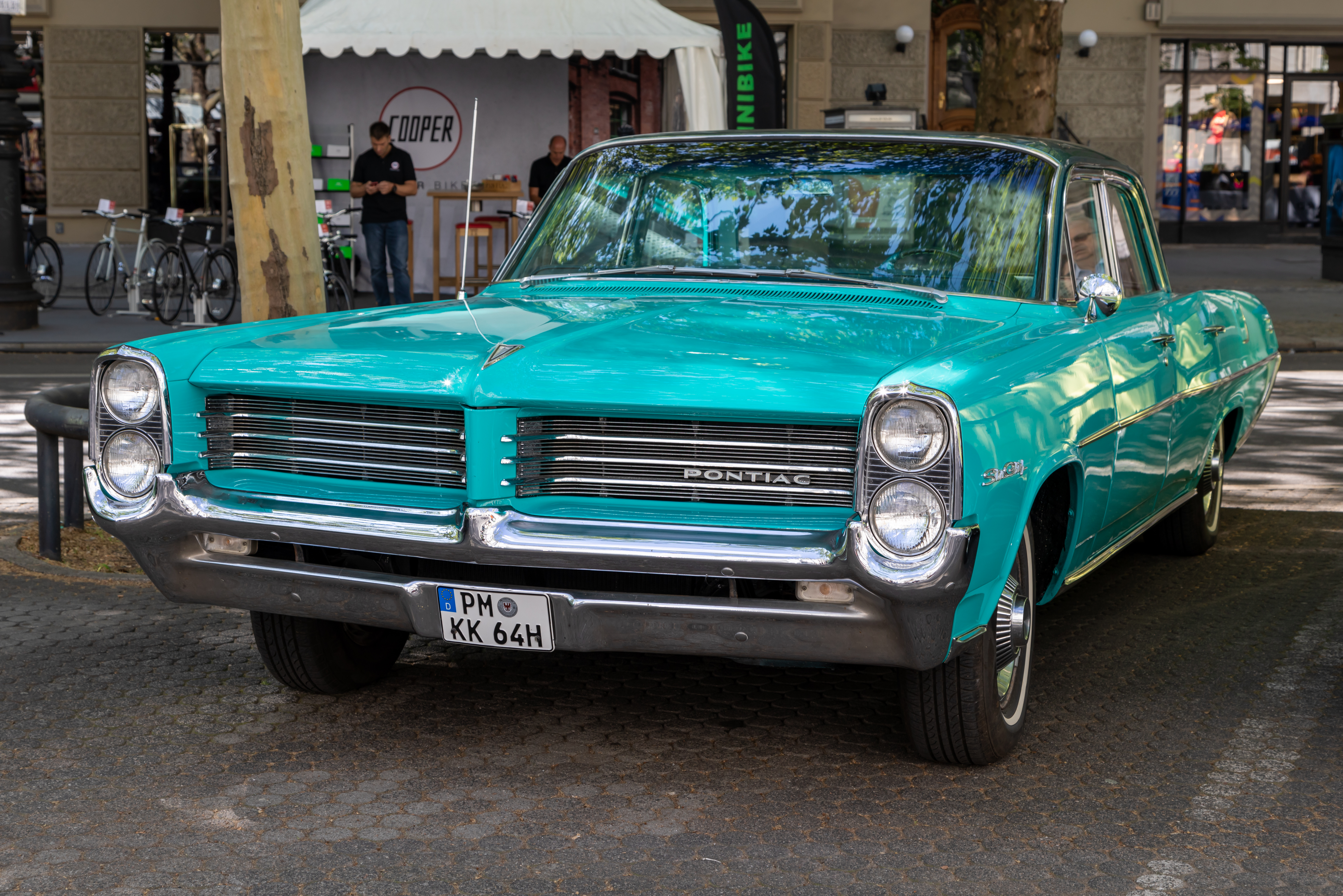
1964 Pontiac Star Chief 4 Door Sedan

== Sixth generation (1965-1966) ==
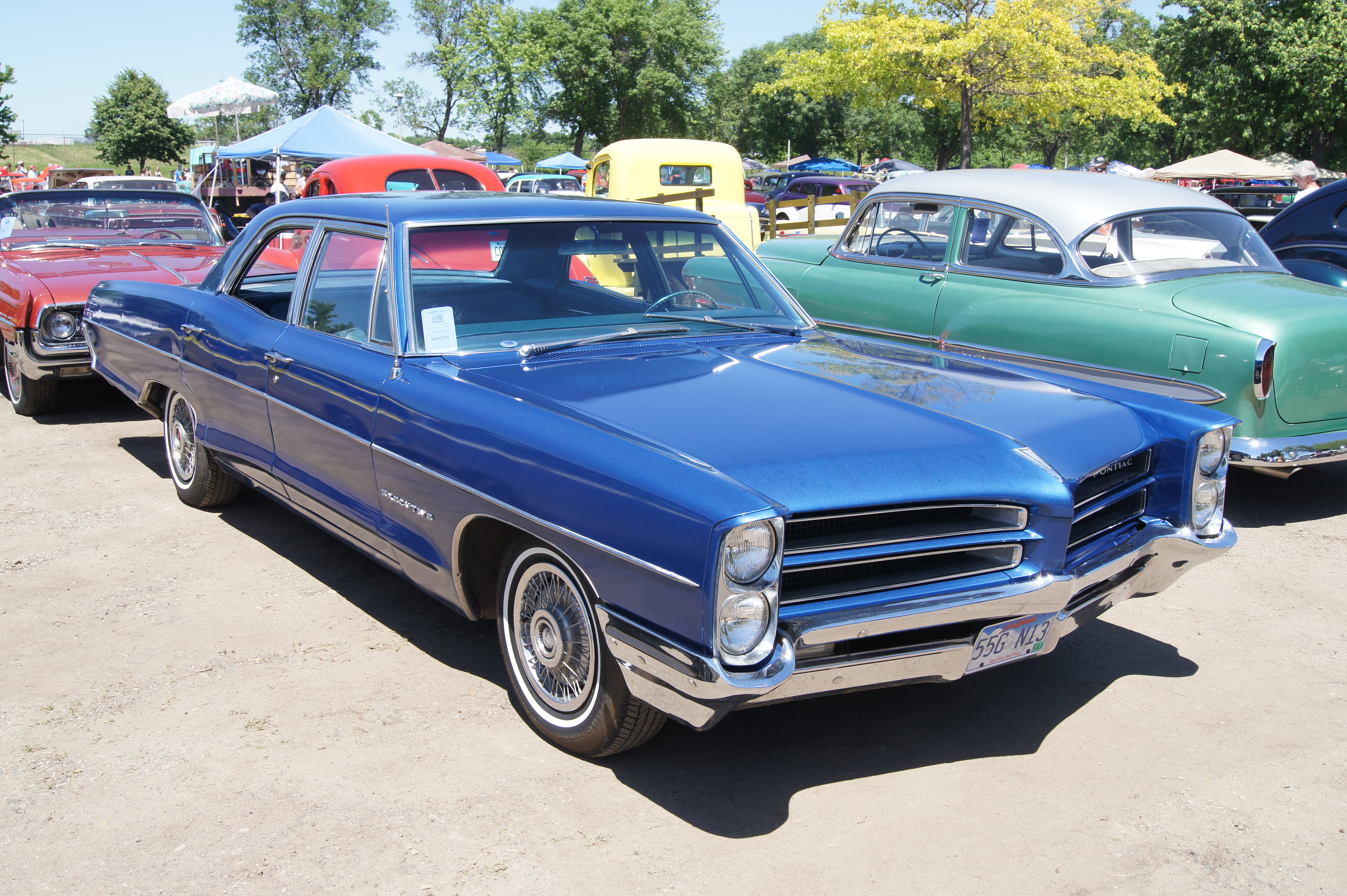
1966 Pontiac Star Chief Executive sedan

Sixth generation
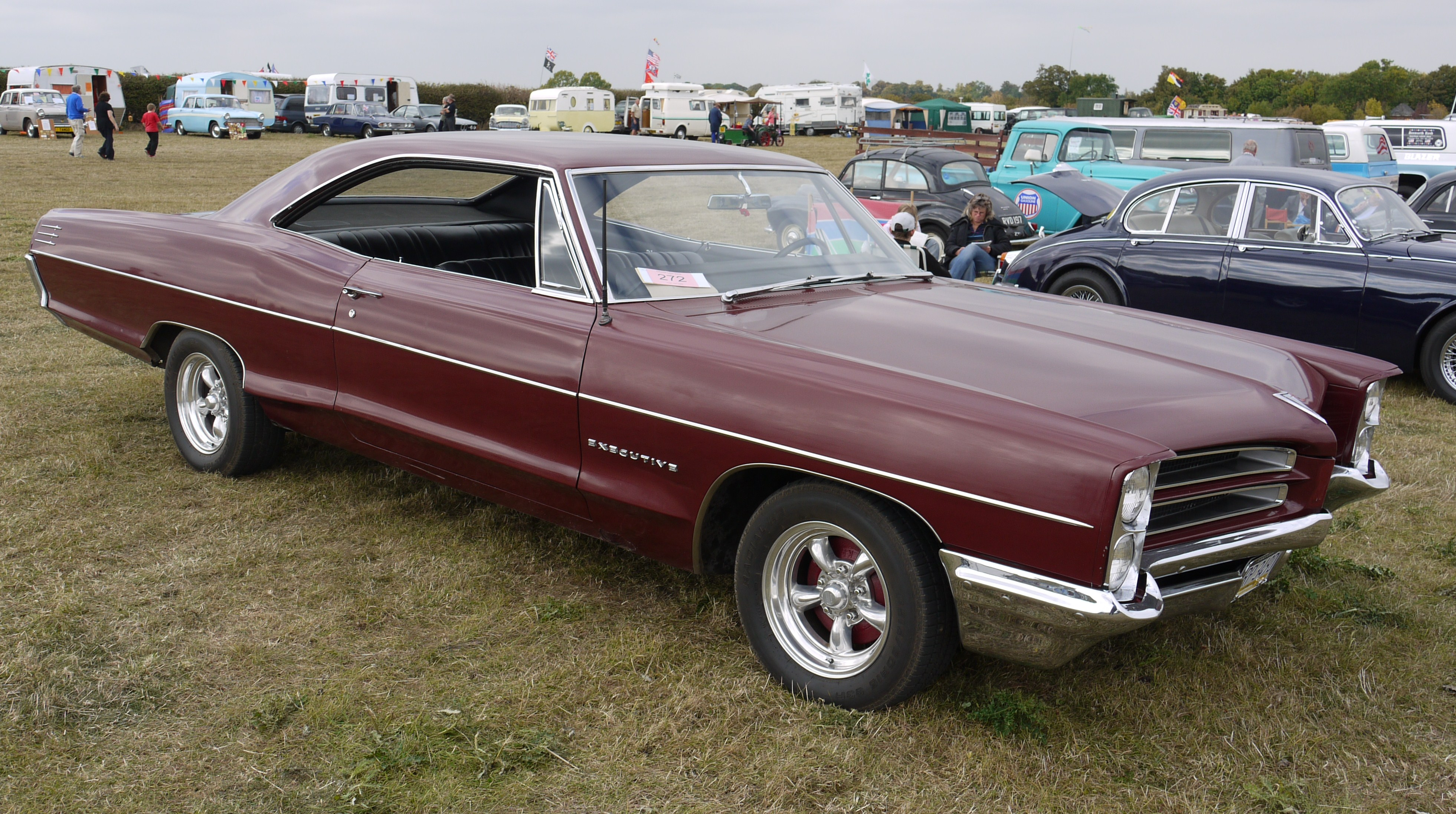

Overview
- Model years: 1965–1966
- Assembly: (main plant); Pontiac, Michigan, United States (Pontiac Assembly) (branch assembly); Kansas City, Kansas, United States (Fairfax Assembly); South Gate, California, United States (South Gate Assembly)

Body and chassis
- Body style: 2-door hardtop 4-door sedan 4-door hardtop
- Layout: FR layout
- Platform: B-body
- Related: Pontiac Bonneville; Chevrolet Impala

Dimensions
- Wheelbase: 124 in (3,150 mm)

For 1966, the car was renamed the Star Chief Executive as the first step towards retiring the name, which by the mid-1960s had become dated. For 1967, Pontiac dropped the Star Chief name for United States sales and renamed the mid-priced model the Executive.

In Canada, Pontiac models used Chevrolet drivelines for greater economy. To ensure that used car buyers in the U.S. were not sold less expensive Canadian models, different series names were used. The Canadian equivalent to the Star Chief was called Laurentian. Nonetheless, Pontiac offered a similarly named series called the Strato Chief, but this model was the lowest-priced big Canadian Pontiac.
