= Pontiac Assembly =

General Motors assembly plant

- Built: 1927
- Operated: 1927–1988
- Location: Baldwin Avenue; Pontiac, Michigan
- Coordinates: 42.66°N 83.3°W
- Industry: Automotive
- Products: Automobiles
- Owner: General Motors
- Defunct: 1988; 38 years ago

Pontiac Assembly was one of four General Motors assembly plants in Pontiac, Michigan located along Baldwin Avenue. It served as the home factory for GM's Pontiac Motor Division since it was built in 1927. It was across the street from the currently operational Pontiac Metal Center, which was the original location for the Oakland Motor Car Company, which Pontiac evolved out of.

== History ==
The location that Oakland inhabited was the original site of Cartercar when GM bought the company in 1909 by William Durant. The plant ceased production of full-size Pontiacs after the 1980 model year, but continued to build mid-size Pontiacs ('81-82 Grand Prix, '81 LeMans, '82 Bonneville G) until it was idled on August 6, 1982. Pontiac Assembly used VIN P and from 1965 until 1969 Buick vehicles at the nearby Pontiac Central Assembly VIN V factory.

During World War 2, civilian automobile production was changed over to wartime support, with the last passenger car assembled in 1942. The factory produced mostly field guns like the Bofors 40mm mobile field gun for the Army, the Oerlikon 20 mm cannon used on naval vessels, along with other items. At the nearby Pontiac West Assembly, the GMC transit bus was built for wartime civilian use. The factory earned six Navy "E" flags and two Army-Navy pennants in recognition of its manufacturing efforts.

Another production line was opened in 1983 to build the Fiero at Fisher Body plant #17. The old production line was reopened January 14, 1985 to build the GM "G" body Oldsmobile Cutlass Supreme and Buick Regal, as the Lansing and Flint plants which built them had been converted to new front-wheel-drive car lines. Chevrolet Monte Carlo production was added for 1987, and Pontiac Grand Prix production returned in October 1987. Production ended when a Buick Grand National was completed on December 11, 1987. Fiero production ended on August 16, 1988, and the plant was permanently closed.

Manufacturing operations were transferred to Orion Assembly in Orion Township, Michigan. Engine block and cylinder heads were cast at Saginaw Metal Casting Operations, internal engine components were created at Bay City Powertrain and the engines were then assembled at Tonawanda Engine and Romulus Engine.

== Vehicles built ==
=== Oakland ===
- Oakland Four
- Oakland Six

=== Pontiac ===
- Six
- 2+2 (1964–1970)
- Bonneville (1957–1980)
- Catalina (1959–1981)
- Chieftain (1950–1958)
- Custom S (1969)
- De-Lux (1937)
- Executive (1967–1970)
- Fiero (1984–1988)
- Grand Am (1973–1975, 1978–1980)
- Grand Prix (1962–1986)
- Grand Safari (1971–1978)
- Grand Ville (1971–1975)
- GTO (1964–1973)
- LeMans (1962–1981)
- Safari (1955–1980)
- Star Chief (1954–1966)
- Streamliner (1941–1951)
- Super Chief (1957–1958)
- Tempest (1961–1970)
- Torpedo (1940–1948)
- Ventura (1960–1970)

== Aftermath ==
The Pontiac Metal Center currently provides material for dozens of Chevrolet, Buick, GMC and Cadillac products:

- Chevrolet: Sonic, Traverse, Express, Colorado, Silverado, Tahoe, Suburban and Corvette
- Buick: Enclave
- GMC: Acadia, Sierra, Savana, Yukon and Canyon
- Cadillac: Escalade
