= Assembly Atlanta =

Film and television studios in Georgia, US

- Former names: Doraville Assembly (General Motors plant)
- Address: 2582 Assembly Boulevard
- Location: Doraville, Georgia, U.S.
- Owner: Gray Media
- Operator: NBCUniversal (Universal Production Services)
- Type: Film and television production campus / mixed-use development

Construction
- Opened: October 2023
- Architect: Smith Dalia Architects
- General contractor: The Gipson Company

Assembly Atlanta is a film and television production campus and mixed-use development in Doraville, Georgia, built on the site of a former General Motors assembly plant. Its centerpiece, Assembly Studios, opened in October 2023 as a full-service production complex operated by NBCUniversal's Universal Production Services, and has since hosted network, streaming, and independent productions including Beyond the Gates, Fight Night: The Million Dollar Heist, Teacup, Grosse Pointe Garden Society, Murdaugh: Death in the Family, Cape Fear, and a pilot for a revival of The Rockford Files.

== History ==
=== Former General Motors plant (1947–2008) ===
General Motors opened the Doraville Assembly plant in 1947 under its newly created Buick-Oldsmobile-Pontiac division, on a roughly 165-acre site near what is now Interstate 285. The plant produced more than 9 million vehicles over 61 years, including Buick, Oldsmobile, Pontiac, and Chevrolet models, before GM closed it in September 2008 amid company-wide cost cutting.

=== Early redevelopment as "Assembly" (2014–2021) ===
Integral Group acquired the property in 2014 and proposed redeveloping the land as a mixed-use district known as Assembly. Portions of the property were sold for automobile dealerships, while another portion was developed as the corporate headquarters of Serta Simmons Bedding.

Third Rail Studios, a film and television production facility occupying approximately seven acres and originally developed by The Integral Group, opened at the site in 2016. The studio hosted a number of high-profile productions, including the feature films Rampage, Mile 22, and Richard Jewell, the first season of NBC's Good Girls, and Netflix's Emmy-nominated series Ozark. Gray Television acquired Third Rail Studios in September 2021 and folded it into the larger Assembly site; it is now owned and operated under Gray Media.

=== Gray Media acquisition and "Studio City" plan (2021) ===
Gray Media purchased the remaining property in March 2021 to pursue a new "Studio City" concept, with Gray chairman and CEO Hilton H. Howell Jr. leading the project. By 2022, Gray described the assembled 135-acre site as encompassing a 43-acre studio complex — featuring soundstages, production offices, warehouse and mill buildings, studio bungalows, event space, and a parking deck.

In June 2022, Gray announced a long-term agreement under which NBCUniversal would lease and operate new studio facilities at the site and manage all studio and production operations across the complex, including Gray's own facilities and Third Rail Studios.

=== Construction (2021–2023) ===
Construction broke ground in September 2021. At the time of the NBCUniversal deal, three soundstage walls had already been erected, with additional soundstages, production offices, mill buildings, event spaces, and warehouses still to come. Steel for the project was purchased in 2021 to avoid pandemic-related shortages, and the contractor built a temporary on-site concrete plant; roughly 83 acres of the former GM plant's concrete floors were broken up over about a year and reused as fill.

=== Opening (October–November 2023) ===
Assembly Studios opened with 19 soundstages across roughly 43 of the site's 135 acres. Gray marked the opening with a gala on October 21, 2023, featuring a commissioned mural by Atlanta artist Steve Penley, a drone show, and performances by Cee Lo Green, Gladys Knight, Dionne Warwick, and Sheryl Crow; the company said it had invested more than $400 million in the buildout. A formal grand-opening announcement followed on November 9, 2023.

== Facilities and design ==
Assembly Studios was designed by Smith Dalia Architects, with additional project partners including The Gipson Company (developer and construction manager), Joe N. Guy Co., Bailey Construction, HGOR, Kimley-Horn, PES Structural, Centerpoint Sitework and Utilities, Nanolumens, and Capital Signs. JLL served as strategic advisor.

The campus comprises more than one million square feet of production space. Its 22 soundstages include 19 at Assembly Studios and three at the adjacent Third Rail Studios, providing roughly 350,000 square feet of stage space across the combined campus (reflecting the original configuration, not a later expansion). Individual stages range from 15,000 to 30,000 square feet, with grid heights of 40 to 50 feet.

Additional facilities include approximately 100,000 square feet of mill space across three mill buildings and a mill warehouse, as well as administrative facilities, studio bungalows and turn-key production offices with bullpen-style workspaces, private offices, conference rooms, executive suites and break rooms. Production support amenities include costume, sign and fabrication shops; a paint shop; set lighting, grip and transportation departments; and an on-site café.

The filmable exterior backlot is organized into four districts: "New Orleans," "New York Brownstones," "European City," and "Tribeca." The façades were built with real construction materials rather than as false fronts. The campus also includes a roughly 300-foot-long water stage that can be rigged with green screens and digitally transformed to represent different bodies of water, according to Gray Television CEO Hilton Howell.

A landscaped public park and pond sit alongside the backlot façades and connect to the Chamblee Rail Trail through a covered trestle bridge. The campus is located at 2582 Assembly Boulevard in Doraville, Georgia, near Interstate 85 North at Exit 95.

== Public spaces and features ==
Areas outside the soundstages are open to the public, including a landscaped park and a pond that also serves as stormwater retention. A 140-foot, roughly 23-foot-wide LED tower designed and built by Nanolumens and installed with Capital Signs stands at the campus entrance facing Interstate 285; the companies involved in its construction describe it as the largest freestanding LED screen in North America, a claim reported by multiple outlets but not independently verified.

A mural by Atlanta artist Steve Penley, depicting Georgia landmarks and cultural touchstones including the Fox Theatre, the Varsity, and Ebenezer Baptist Church, was unveiled on the side of a soundstage.

In 2026, Assembly Atlanta added a mass-timber-and-steel bandshell, described as the largest timber-grid amphitheater in North America, with a stage floor roughly the size of the Fox Theatre's. The venue hosted public watch parties for the 2026 FIFA World Cup, including a two-day festival presented by Telemundo Atlanta.

== Operations ==
Assembly Studios is owned by Gray Media and operated by NBCUniversal's Universal Production Services under a multi-year agreement signed in 2022, with NBCUniversal serving as anchor tenant and lead lessee, and providing services including a costume house, sign shop, lighting, grip, and transportation.

=== Georgia Film Academy Training Facility ===
In June 2025, the Georgia Film Academy announced a partnership with Assembly Studios to open a 32,000-square-foot workforce training facility adjacent to the campus, offering certifications in film and television production, post-production, and live production, streaming, and esports; classes began August 18, 2025. The facility is a satellite of GFA's primary hub at Trilith Studios in Fayetteville and also offers a paid internship and apprenticeship program placing students directly on working sets. The facility's grand opening in August 2025 featured remarks from University System of Georgia chancellor Sonny Perdue and Georgia Film Office deputy commissioner Lee Thomas.

== Productions ==
Since opening, Assembly Studios has hosted productions for multiple networks and streaming services.

Year	Production	Network / Distributor	Status
Ongoing since 2024	Beyond the Gates	CBS (CBS Studios, NAACP, P&G Studios); Paramount+	Ongoing
2024	Fight Night: The Million Dollar Heist	Peacock (NBCUniversal)	—
2024	Teacup	Peacock (NBCUniversal)	—
2025	Grosse Pointe Garden Society	NBC (also Peacock)	—
2025	Murdaugh: Death in the Family	Hulu	—
2025	The Good Daughter	Fifth Season	Atlanta shoot confirmed; Assembly Studios not confirmed
2026	Cape Fear	Apple TV+	—
2025	Stumble	NBC	Series ordered; cancelled after one season
2026	The Rockford Files (revival)	NBC	Pilot filmed at Assembly March 9–23, 2026; picked up for 2026–27
2026	Puzzled	NBC	Pilot; not picked up
2026	Southern Bastards	Hulu	Pilot
2026	The Challenger	Amazon	Assembly Studios served as the production's home base
2026	The Ms. Pat Show	Paramount+/BET+	Taped at 2582 Assembly Boulevard
2026	Da Vinci	Independent	Filmed at Assembly Studios
2026	On A Bell	Independent	Filmed and wrapped at Assembly Studios

== Live events ==
Beyond film and television production, Assembly Atlanta has hosted live sporting and community events. Since 2025, the campus has been home to INTENNSE, a fast-paced, team-based professional tennis league that debuted with six teams and expanded to ten for its 2026 season. Matches are played in a 30,000-square-foot soundstage converted into a 500-seat arena, and the league's 2026 season ran from June to August with 52 events.
