= Doraville Assembly =

Former General Motors automobile factory

Coordinates: 33°54′13.19″N 84°17′1.04″W

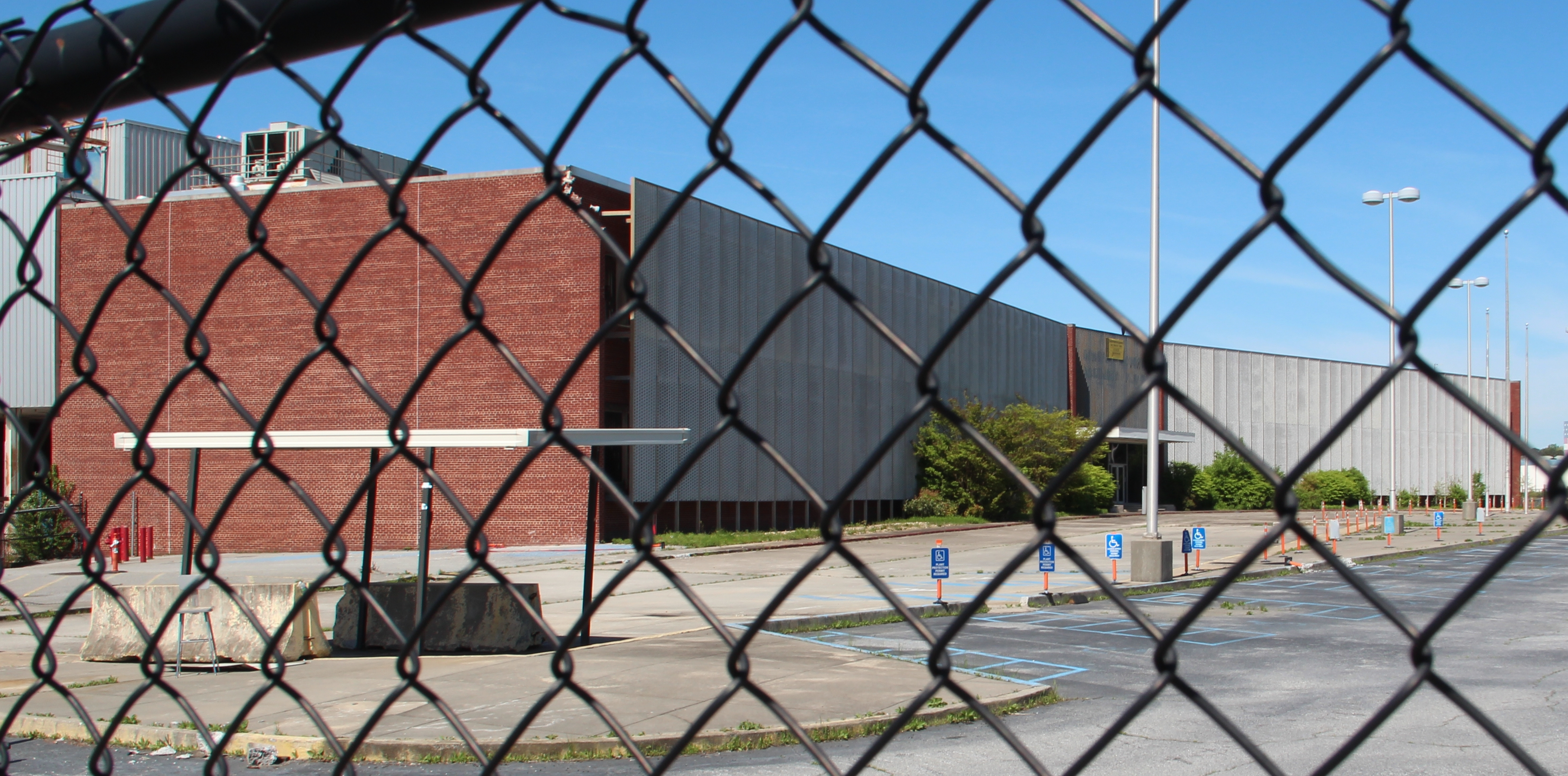
- Industry: Automotive
- Founded: 1947
- Defunct: September 26, 2008
- Area served: Doraville, Georgia
- Products: Automobiles
- Parent: General Motors Company

Doraville Assembly was a General Motors automobile factory in Doraville, Georgia, just northeast of Atlanta. The plant opened in 1947 and was under the management of GM's newly created Buick-Oldsmobile-Pontiac Assembly Division created in 1945. It was closed on 26 September 2008 as part of the company's cost-cutting measures. According to an article that appeared in the Atlanta Journal-Constitution on January 28, 2010, New Broad Street Doraville, LLC, a development company, executed a purchase contract with General Motors for the former plant, and was planning to build a mixed-use, transit-oriented development. New Broad Street's deal fell through when DeKalb County decided against using federal stimulus money and property taxes to partially fund the project.

Doraville Assembly was one of two General Motors factories in Atlanta; the second one was called Lakewood Assembly, in the southeast community of Lakewood Heights, built in 1927.

The site is adjacent to the four-track Doraville Yard, a railyard that primarily loaded GM automobiles into auto carriers, and is still served by Norfolk Southern for other uses. MARTA's Gold (formerly Northeast) line passes nearby, providing the rapid transit for the new land development around the Doraville station.

As of 2014 the entire assembly facility has been torn down to make way for a new mixed-used, transit oriented development. A corner portion (about 20 acres) was sold off to the Nalley Automotive Group and will be located next to the current Brandsmart. It's the farthest location from the Doraville MARTA station, hence the least walkable. The site was purchased by Integral Group and Macauley + Schmit. They have developed a master plan of streets, parks and such which was approved by the City of Doraville. Plans include a "covered street" that will connect Park Avenue to the Assembly Doraville, by going under the MARTA station as well as 13 Norfolk Southern railroad tracks

The former training facility on the Southern portion of the site has been converted into Assembly Atlanta, which includes Assembly Studios and Third Rail Studios, a full service film and television production facility to serve the growing film and television industry in Georgia. Third Rail Studios opened in August 2016. Assembly Atlanta is the filming location for the 2025 CBS soap Beyond the Gates.

== Past products ==
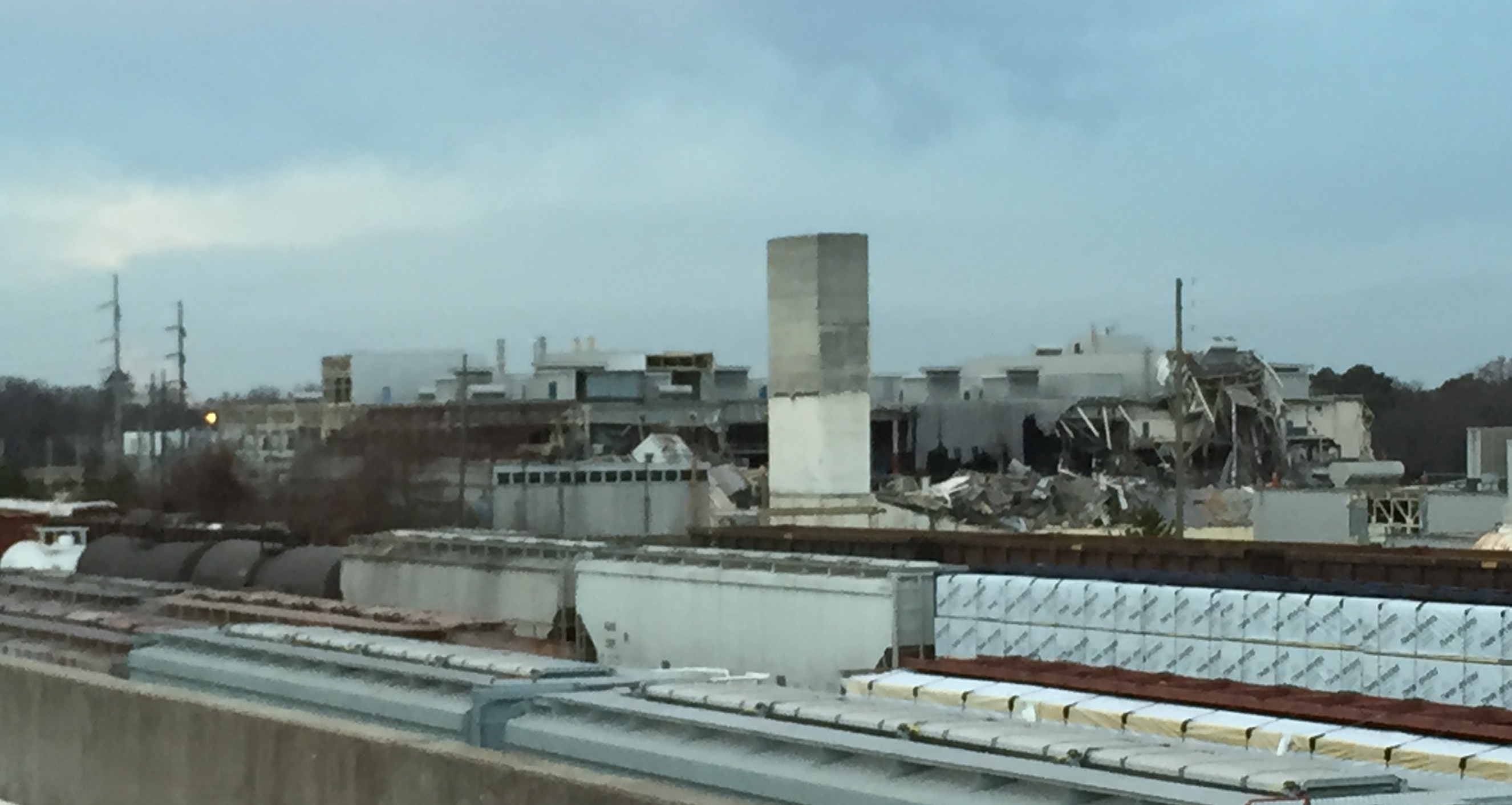
Demolition work at the plant, 2015.

- 1947 Buick Super Woody
- 1951 Oldsmobile 88
- 1951 Buick Super 8 Special
- 1953 Buick Skylark
- 1955-57 Buick Century
- 1956 Oldsmobile Super 88 Convertible Coupe
- 1957 Pontiac Star Chief
- 1958-1966 Pontiac Bonneville
- 1960 Oldsmobile Super 88
- 1962-1966 Pontiac Grand Prix
- 1964-1970 Chevrolet Impala
- 1961-1973 Pontiac Catalina
- 1972 Chevy Nova
- 1976 Chevrolet Monte Carlo
- (1979–1984) Oldsmobile Cutlass Supreme (A- & G-body)
- (1988–1995) Oldsmobile Cutlass Supreme (W-body)
- (1982–1987) Oldsmobile Cutlass Ciera
- (1997–2005) Chevrolet Venture
- (1997–2005) Pontiac Trans Sport / Montana
- (1997–2004) Oldsmobile Silhouette
- (1997–1999) Opel Sintra (UK market Vauxhall Sintra)
- (2005–2007) Buick Terraza
- (2005–2007) Saturn Relay
- Chevrolet Uplander (Model year 2005–2009 for Canada, 2005–2008 For U.S.)
- Pontiac Montana SV6 (Model year 2005–2009 for Canada, 2005–2006 For U.S.)

== See also ==
- General Motors Companion Make Program
- List of GM factories
