= Pontiac Torpedo =

Full-sized car produced by Pontiac (1939-1948)

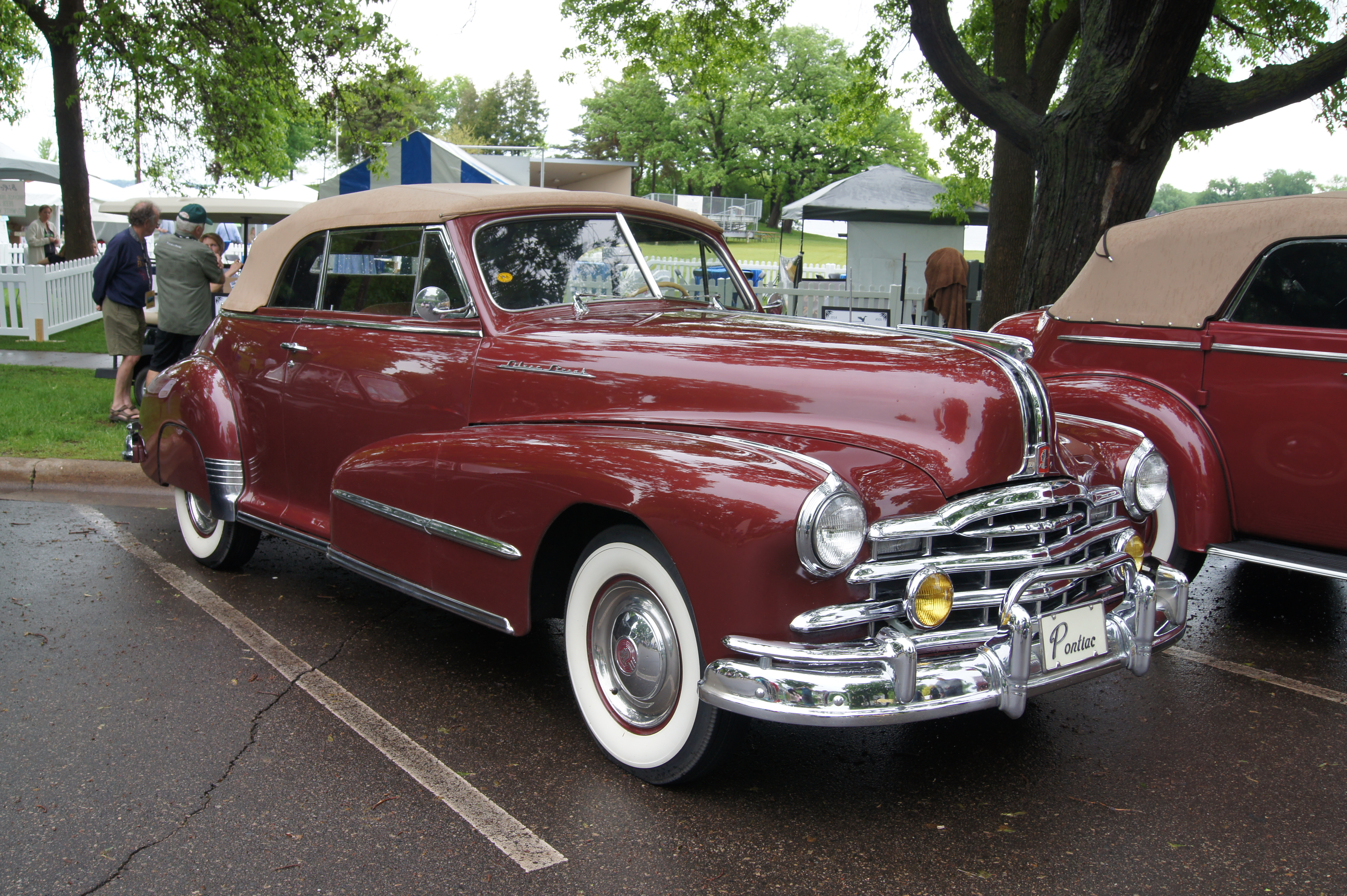
- 1948 Pontiac Torpedo Convertible

Overview
- Manufacturer: Pontiac (General Motors)
- Production: 1939–1942 and 1946–1948

Body and chassis
- Class: Full-size
- Layout: FR layout

Chronology
- Predecessor: Pontiac Six
- Successor: Pontiac Chieftain

The Pontiac Torpedo is a full-sized car produced by Pontiac from the 1940 model year until February 2, 1942. Civilian car and truck production ended during World War II, and companies shifted to supply the war effort. Assembly of nearly identical pre-war Pontiacs restarted in 1945; however, Torpedo models were not available until June 1946. Production continued through 1948, after which the Pontiac Chieftain replaced the Torpedo for the 1949 model year.

When released, the Torpedo was the largest Pontiac, featured an eight-cylinder engine, and had more standard equipment than other Pontiacs. The Torpedo name was exclusive to Pontiac's highest line in 1940. In 1941, the name was applied to all Pontiacs in three separate lines. The Custom Torpedoes were now the top-of-the-line model, while the DeLuxe Torpedo became the baseline, and the Streamline Torpedo became the middle line of Pontiacs. All Torpedo models were available with either a straight six- or eight-cylinder engine beginning in 1941. From 1942 through 1948, the Torpedo name designated only the base Ponieac models.

== 1940–1941 ==
=== 1940: Custom Torpedo (C-body) ===
First Generation
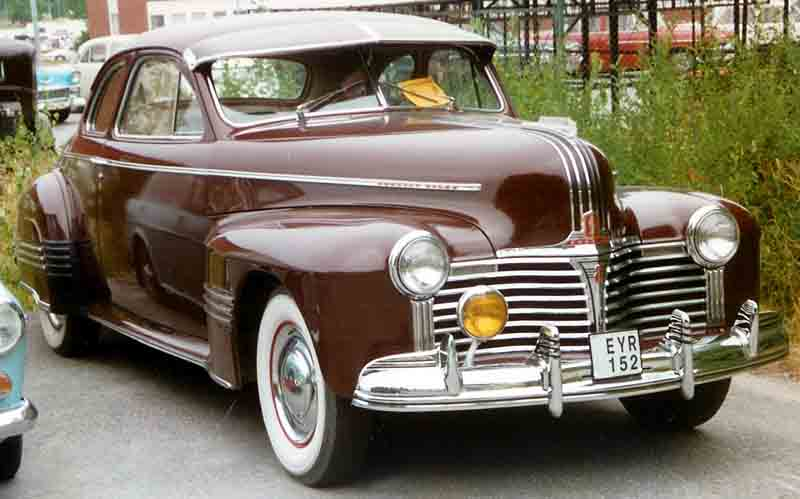

Overview
- Model years: 1940–1941
- Assembly: (main plant); Pontiac, Michigan (branch assembly plants); South Gate, California; Linden, New Jersey
- Designer: Harley Earl

Body and chassis
- Body style: Custom: 2-door sedan 4-door 4-window sedan 4-door station wagon Streamliner: 2-door fastback Sedan coupe 4-door fastback sedan Deluxe: 2-door Business coupe 2-door Club coupe 2-door sedan 4-door 6-window sedan 4-door 4-window Metropolitan sedan 2-door convertible
- Platform: A-body; B-body; C-body
- Related: Deluxe Torpedo JA Line: (A-body); Oldsmobile Series 60; Chevrolet Special Deluxe; Chevrolet Fleetline; Chevrolet Fleetmaster; Chevrolet Stylemaster; Chevrolet Master Deluxe; Chevrolet Master 85 Streamliner Torpedo JB Line: (B-Body); Cadillac Series 61; Buick Century; Buick Special; Oldsmobile Series 70 Custom Torpedo JC Line: (C-Body); Cadillac Series 62; LaSalle Series 52; Buick Roadmaster; Buick Super; Oldsmobile 90/96/98

Powertrain
- Engine: 239 cu in (3.9 L) Flathead I6; 249 cu in (4.1 L) Silver-Streak I8
- Transmission: 3-speed synchromesh manual

Dimensions
- Wheelbase: 1940: 122 in (3,099 mm); 1941 Deluxe and Custom: 122 in (3,099 mm); 1941 Special: 119 in (3,023 mm)
- Length: 1940: 207.5 in (5,270 mm); 1941: Custom: 211.5 in (5,372 mm); Custom station wagon: 213.5 in (5,423 mm); Streamliner: 207.5 in (5,270 mm); Deluxe: 201.5 in (5,118 mm)
- Width: 1940: 74.5 in (1,892 mm)
- Height: 1940: 65 in (1,651 mm)
- Curb weight: 1940: 3,600–3,700 lb (1,633–1,678 kg); 1941: Custom: 3,500–3,900 lb (1,588–1,769 kg); Streamliner: 3,500–3,700 lb (1,588–1,678 kg); Deluxe: 3,300–3,500 lb (1,497–1,588 kg)

In 1940, Pontiac introduced the Custom Torpedo on the General Motors C-body. Along with Oldsmobile, Pontiac had the distinction of having all three of GM's mainstream platforms this year, but this would last only one more year. The new C-body that the 1940 Pontiac Torpedo shared with Cadillac Series 62, Buick Roadmaster and Super, and the Oldsmobile Series 90 featured cutting-edge "torpedo" styling. Shoulder and hip room was over 5 in (127 mm) wider; running boards were eliminated, and the exterior was streamlined and 2–3 in (51–76 mm) lower. With a column-mounted shift lever, the cars offered true six-passenger comfort, which all GM products shared that year.

The 1940 Torpedo had larger windows and wider seats than other Pontiacs, front and rear "ventiplanes" on 4-door sedans and long, gracefully streamlined rear decks. Concealed hinges were used on all doors. The doors were extra wide. The hood ornament had a plastic Indian head mounted in a metal base. Front end sheet metal looked like that on other Pontiacs. Eight-cylinder badges were used front and rear. The door locks had weather-sealed keyholes. Gas filler tubes were enclosed under "flip-up" lids on the left rear fenders. The window openings were trimmed with bright metal moldings. It was available only with the Inline 8-cylinder engine and as either a 4-passenger 2-door Sedan or a 5-passenger 4-door Sedan. A heater, cigarette lighter, six-tube radios, an electric clock, and a trunk light were all optional.

=== 1941: Torpedo name on all Pontiacs ===
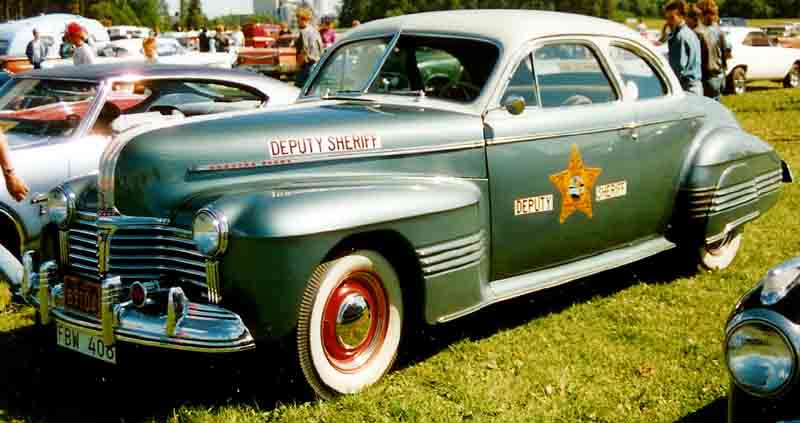
1941 Pontiac Streamliner Torpedo Eight Sedan Coupe (B-body)

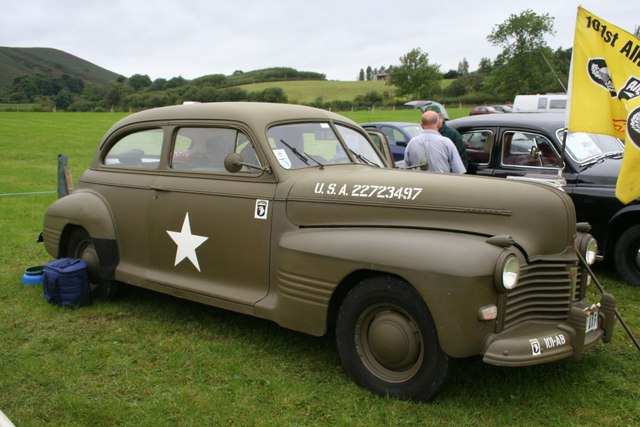
1941 Pontiac Deluxe Six or Eight Torpedo 2-door Sedan (A-body)

In 1941 the A-body and B-body were similarly redesigned with lower, wider running board-less bodies (though running boards were offered as an extra-cost option) Consequently, Pontiac renamed its entire line-up "Torpedo", with models ranging from the low-end A-bodied Deluxe Torpedo (with a 119-inch wheelbase), the mid-level B-bodied Streamliner Torpedo (with a 122-inch wheelbase), and the high-end C-bodied Custom Torpedo (with the same 122-inch wheelbase as the previous year). All models came with either the six- or eight-cylinder engines.

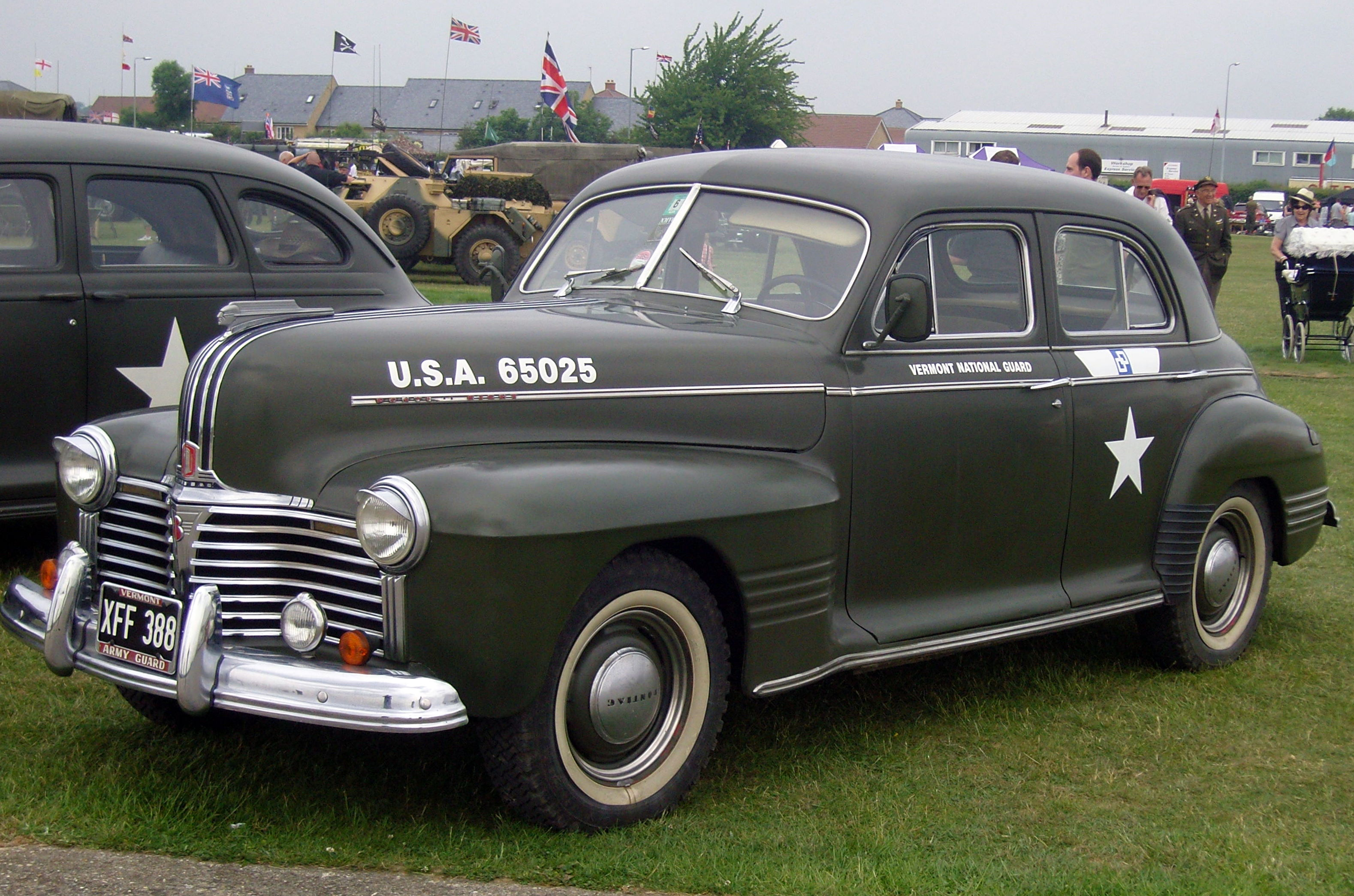
1941 Pontiac Deluxe Torpedo Eight Metropolitan Sedan (A-body)

A wide grille with horizontal bars was used on the A-bodied Deluxe Torpedo. The parking lights were built into the grille. Headlights were fully recessed into the new, wider fenders. Speed-line ribbing was molded into the sides of both front and rear fenders. Deluxe Sixes were in Series 25. Deluxe Eights were in Series 27. The sixes had shorter hood ornaments, a "6" badge on the hood and Pontiac lettering on the side. The eights had larger hood ornaments, an "8" badge on the hood and Pontiac Deluxe lettering on the side. Deluxe Torpedoes had notchback styling. Initially five body styles were available: a 3-passenger 2-door Business Coupe, a 5-passenger 2-door Sedan Coupe, a 5-passenger 2-door Sedan, a 5-passenger 2-door convertible and a 5-passenger 4-door Sedan. The 5-passenger 4-door Metropolitan Sedan was added in the middle of the model year. It had 4-window styling with rear ventiplanes similar to the 4-door Custom Torpedo Sedan instead of the 6-window styling found on the regular 4-door Deluxe Torpedo Sedan. The convertible had a power top.

Sleek fastback styling characterized the B-bodied Streamliner Torpedo. The roofline swept from the windshield to the rear bumper in one smooth curve. The front end sheet metal was the same as on the Deluxe Torpedo and trim difference between sixes and eights were also the same. Streamliner Sixes were in Series 26. Streamliner Eights were in Series 28. Beige corded wool cloth upholstery. There was also a Super Streamliner Torpedo subseries. Supers had the same body styling and trim but featured two-tone worsted wool cloth upholstery with pin stripes. They also added sponge rubber seat cushions, electric clocks, deluxe flexible steering wheels and divan type seats with folding center armrests. Two body-styles were available: a 5-passenger 2-door Sedan Coupe and a 5-passenger 4-door Sedan.

The C-bodied Custom Torpedo had a notchback sedan and coupe as the previous year but new was a 4-door 8-passenger wood bodied station wagon in standard or Deluxe trim. Styling was similar to the Deluxe and Streamliner Torpedoes as were the variations between the sixes and the eights. Custom Sixes were in Series 24. Custom Eights were in Series 29. Station wagon bodies were built by Hercules and Ionia. The Ionia bodies had a more rounded rear end treatment. Standard station wagons had imitation leather upholstery while Deluxe types had genuine leather cushions.

1941 was the last year Pontiac offered a model with the GM C-body until the big "Clamshell tailgate" Pontiac Safari and Grand Safari station wagons of 1971–76.

== 1942–1948 ==
Second generation
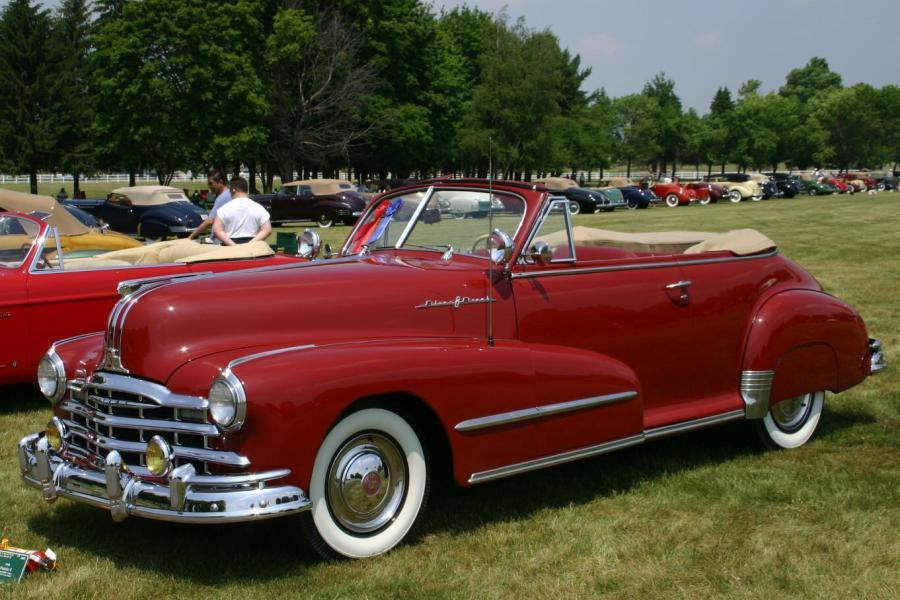

Overview
- Model years: 1942, 1946-1948
- Assembly: (main plant); Pontiac, Michigan (branch assembly plants); South Gate, California; Wilmington, Delaware; Atlanta, Georgia; Kansas City, Kansas; Framingham, Massachusetts; Linden, New Jersey
- Designer: Harley Earl

Body and chassis
- Body style: 2-door Business coupe 2-door Club coupe 2-door sedan 2-door fastback Sedan coupe 4-door 6-window sedan 4-door 4-window Metropolitan sedan 2-door convertible
- Platform: A-body

Powertrain
- Engine: 239 cu in (3.9 L) Flathead I6; 249 cu in (4.1 L) Silver-Streak I8
- Transmission: 3-speed synchromesh manual 4-speed Hydramatic automatic

Dimensions
- Wheelbase: 119.0 in (3,023 mm)
- Length: 204.5 in (5,194 mm)
- Width: 75.8 in (1,925 mm)
- Height: 66 in (1,676 mm)
- Curb weight: 3,400–3,900 lb (1,500–1,800 kg)

Chronology
- Successor: Pontiac Chieftain

For 1942, the Torpedo KA Line Series 25 and Series 27 name was assigned to the A-bodied Pontiac while the Streamliner KB Line became the B-bodied Pontiac. The grille got horizontal bars, while the headlamps were placed farther apart. Most Torpedoes continued to have the notchback styling found on the Deluxe Torpedoes. However, a new body style to the A-bodied Pontiac was a five-passenger two-door Sedan Coupe which had fastback styling similar to the Streamliner. After December 15, 1941, the Torpedo received wartime 'black-out" trim, which meant that all the chrome pieces were painted in Duco Gun-Metal Grey.

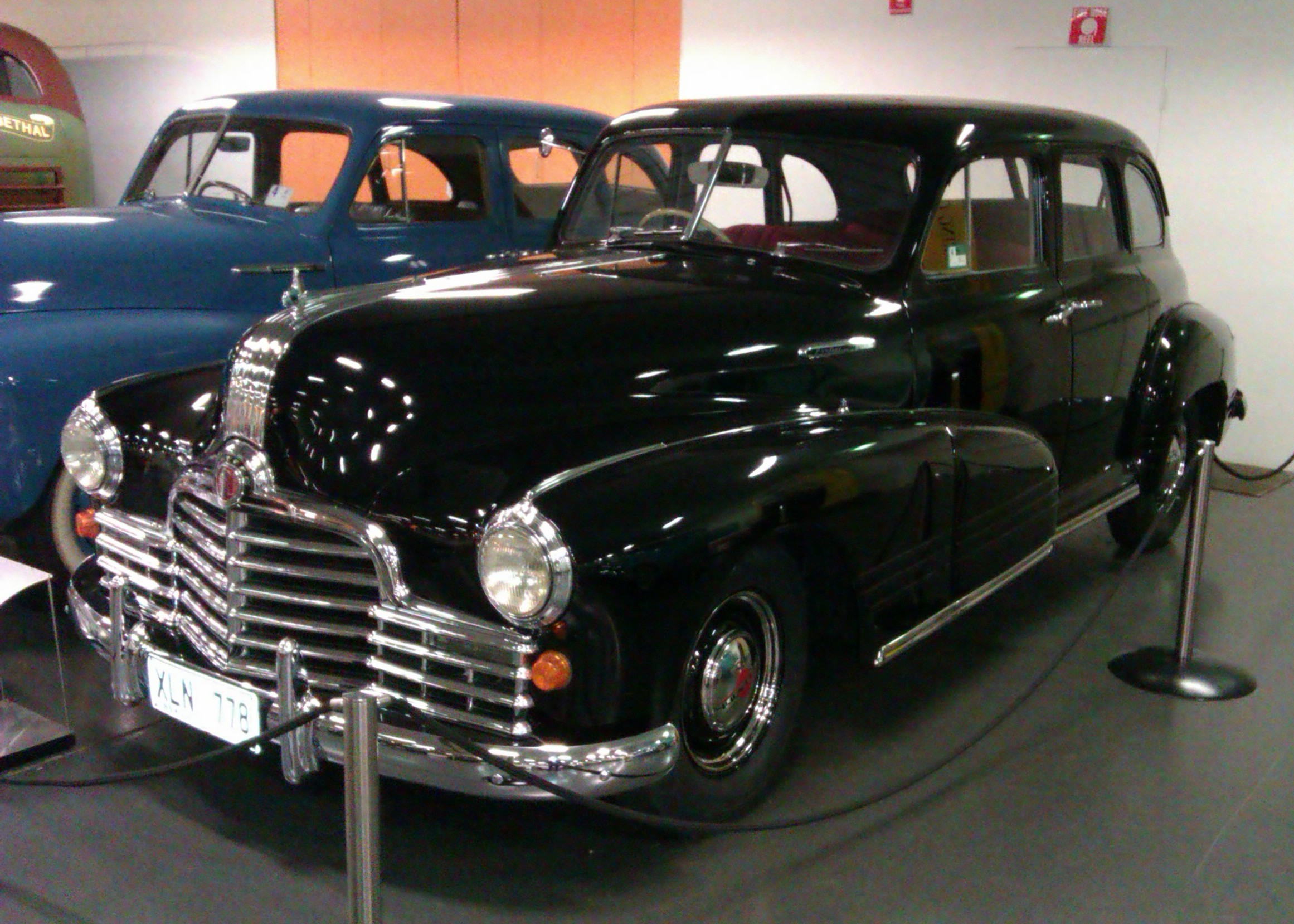
1946 Pontiac Torpedo 4-Door Sedan

In 1946, the first postwar Pontiacs looked very similar to the pre-war models. The dash contained full instrumentation with round gauges. The engines were the same. The four-window four-door Metropolitan Sedan and the two-door Club Coupe were discontinued.

1947 Torpedoes received a new "Chief Pontiac" hood ornament. An eight-tube radio became optional.

1948 was the last year for the Torpedo, receiving a new grille. The Hydramatic automatic transmission became optional. Base price was $1,500.

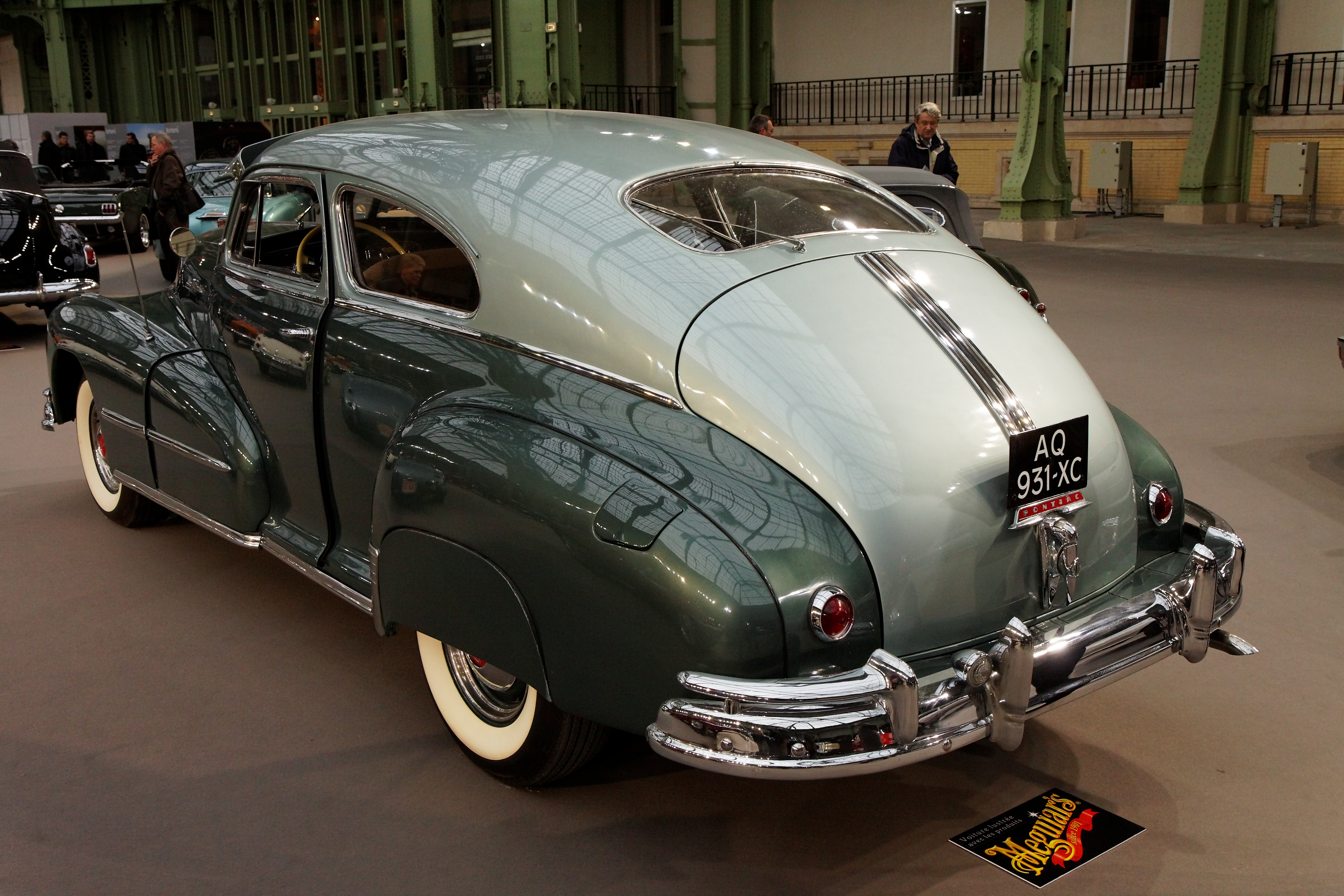
1948 Pontiac Torpedo Eight 2-door Sedan Coupe with view of fastback rear

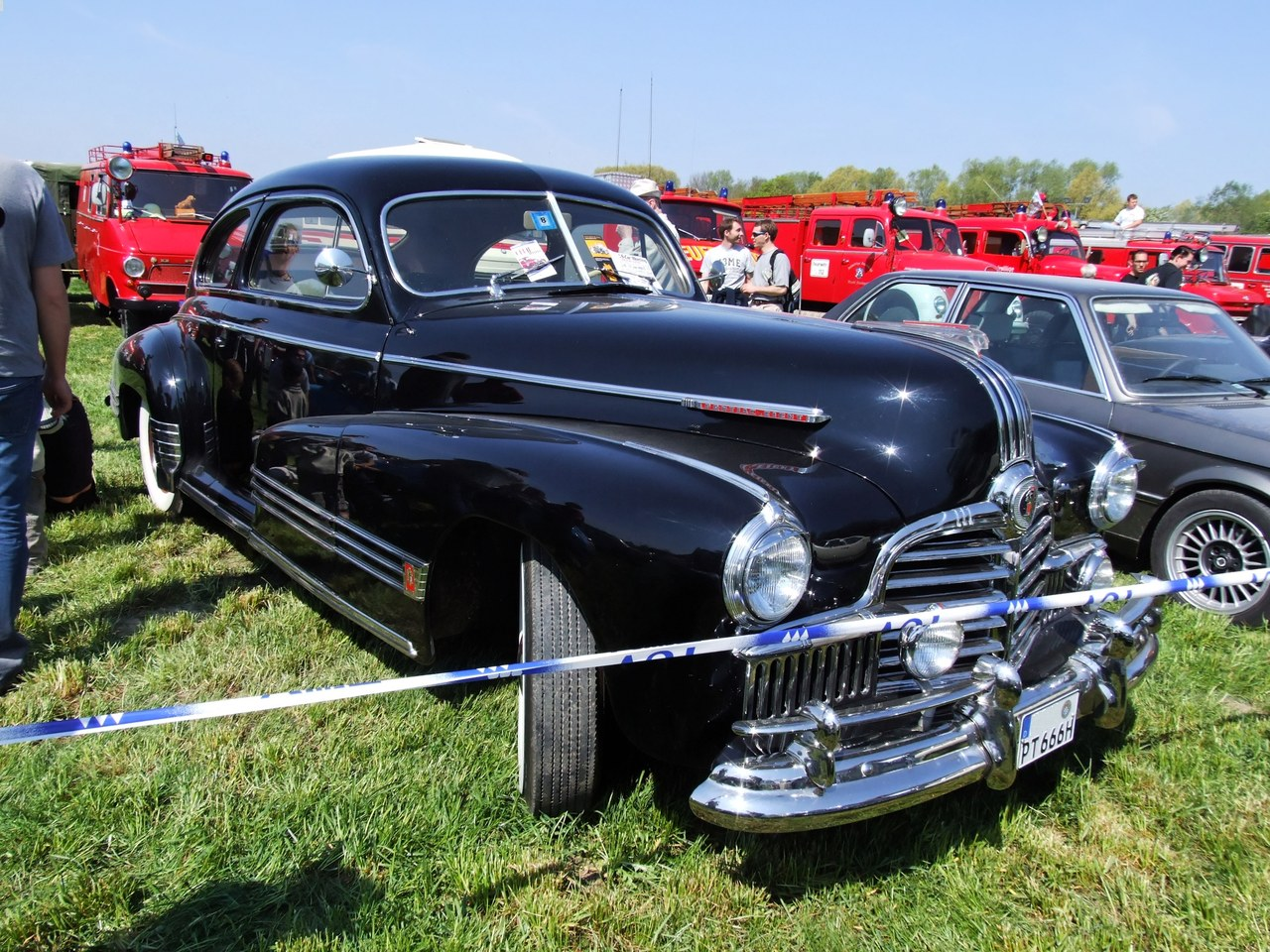
1946 Pontiac Torpedo Eight Business Coupe

== See also ==
Pontiac Streamliner
