= Pontiac Strato-Streak =

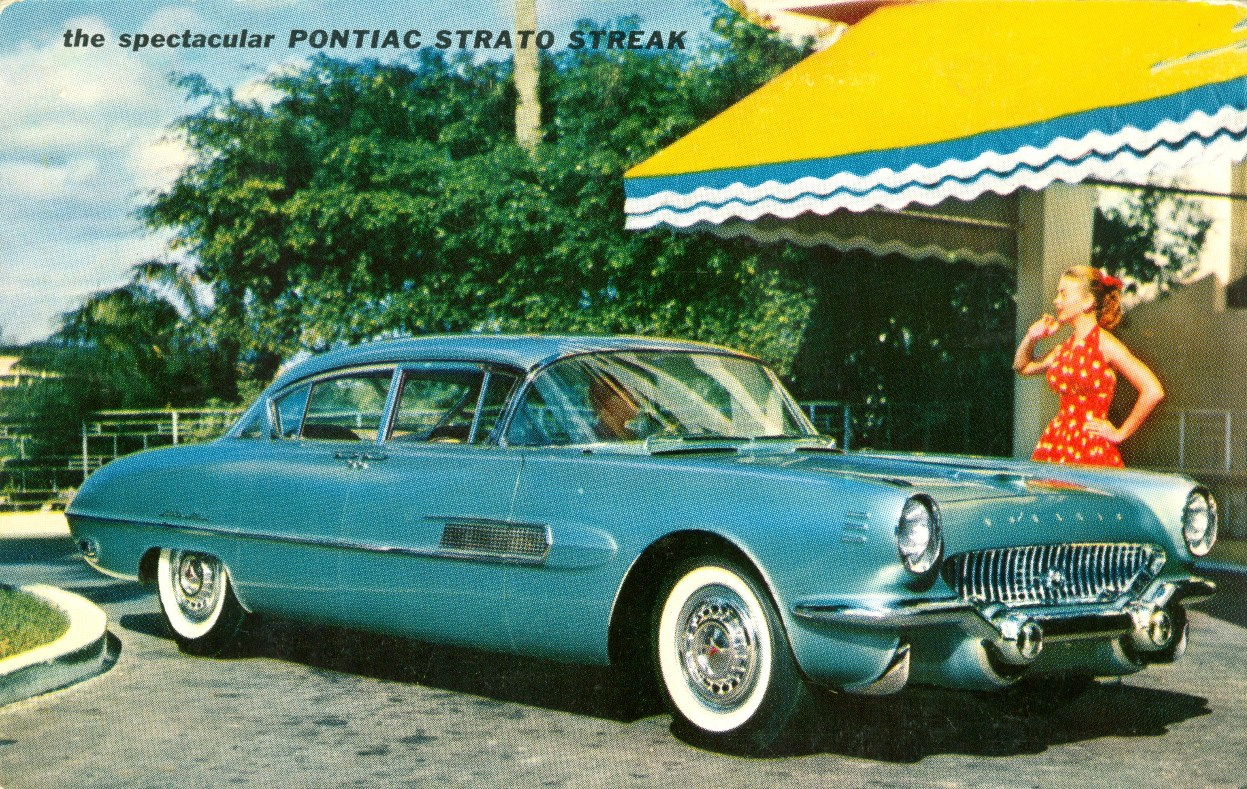

Overview
- Manufacturer: Pontiac
- Production: 1954

Body and chassis
- Class: Concept car
- Body style: 4-door hardtop
- Layout: Front-engine, rear-wheel-drive

Powertrain
- Engine: Pontiac straight-eight engine

Dimensions
- Wheelbase: 124 in (3,149.6 mm)
- Height: 54.7 in (1,389.4 mm)

Chronology
- Predecessor: Pontiac Bonneville Special
- Successor: Pontiac Club de Mer

The Pontiac Strato-Streak was a show car built by Pontiac for the 1954 General Motors Motorama. Its design was inspired by Pontiac's Catalina and based mechanically on the Star Chief's underpinnings. It had a 124 in (3,149.6 mm) wheelbase and was 54.7 in (1,389.4 mm) high. The Strato-Streak was designed as a fiberglass 4-door hardtop, with four swivel bucket seats for easier entry, no center "B" pillar and with the four doors of the sedan opening from the center outwards. As the rear doors opened into the wind, these were fitted with special locks to prevent opening unless the car was stopped and in neutral.

The interior was done in beige leather and gold metallic nylon. The controls for safety and convenience accessories were located on the drive shaft tunnel. It was initially finished in metallic green, but was repainted iridescent metallic red and renamed the Strato Streak II. The "Strato-Streak" name was later used on Pontiac's small block overhead-valve V-8 engines from 1955 to 1957. The concept car was used to introduce the Pontiac V8 engine and introduce a Space Race inspired marketing approach.
