= Pontiac Bonneville Special =

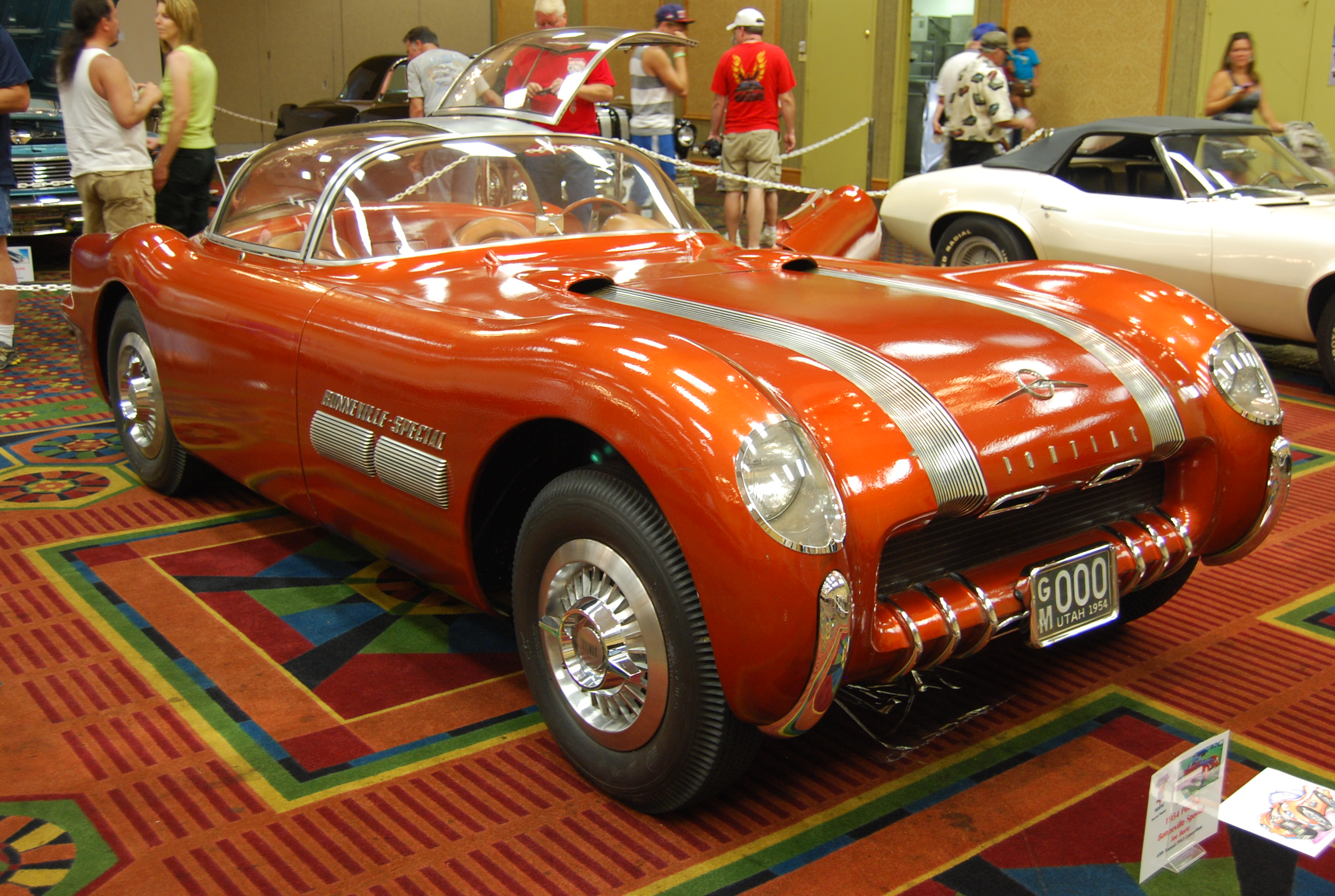
- 1 of the 2 Bonneville Specials

Overview
- Manufacturer: Pontiac (General Motors)
- Also called: SO 2026
- Production: 1954

Body and chassis
- Class: Concept sports car
- Body style: 2-door canopy coupé
- Related: 1954 Corvette (C1); 1954 Oldsmobile F-88

Powertrain
- Engine: 268 cu in (4.4 L) "Special"-8 I8
- Transmission: 4-speed Hydramatic automatic

Dimensions
- Wheelbase: 100.001 in (2,540 mm)
- Length: 158.3 in (4,021 mm)
- Height: 48.001 in (1,219 mm)

Chronology
- Successor: Pontiac Strato-Streak

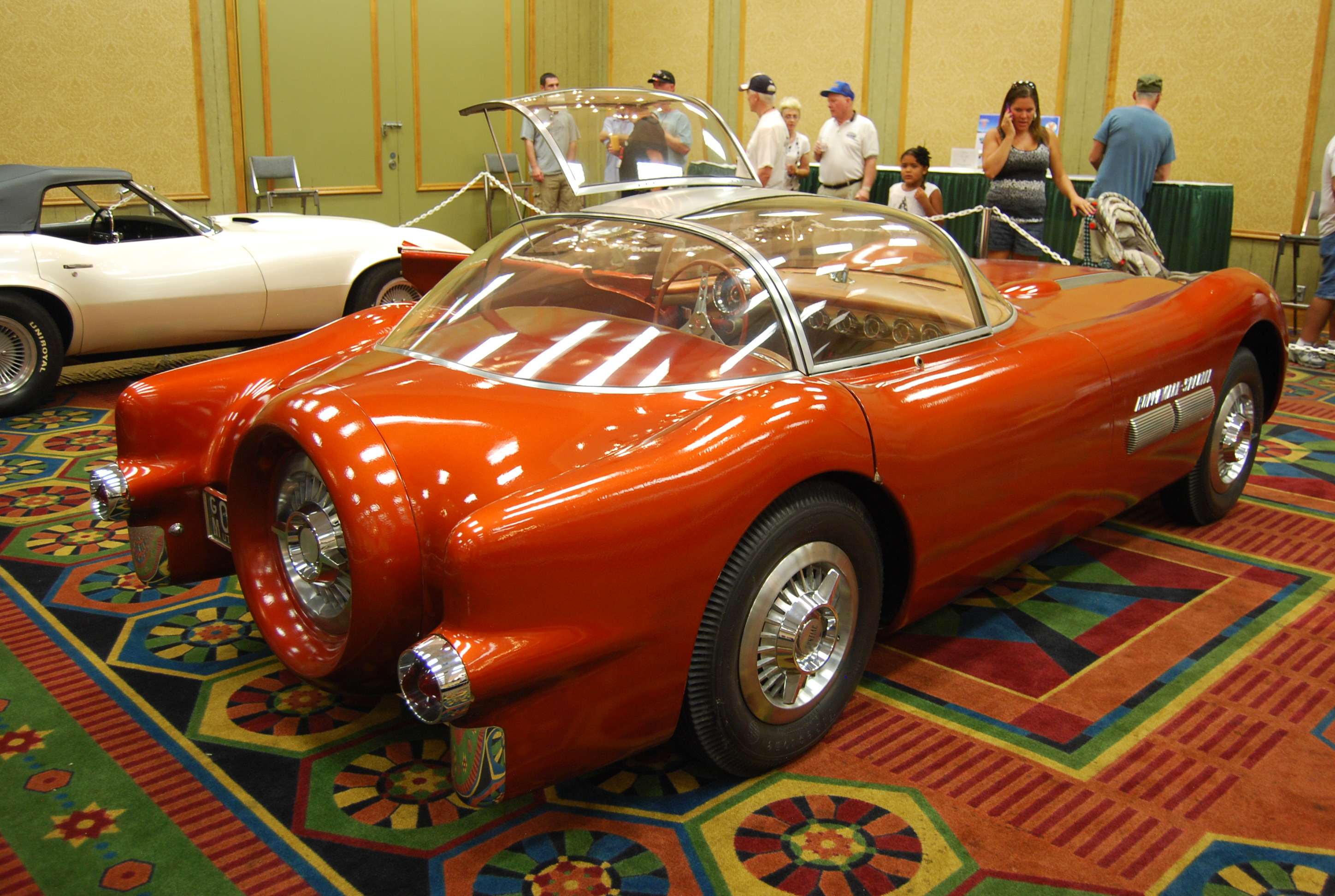
Rear view of the bronze Special

The Pontiac Bonneville Special is a concept car unveiled at the General Motors Motorama in 1954, the first two-seat sports car prototype the division had ever produced. Conceived by designer Harley J. Earl and hand-built by Homer C. LaGassey Jr. and Paul Gillan, the Special is a grand touring sport coupé that incorporated innovative styling like a Plexiglas canopy with gull-wing windows on a sleek fiberglass body.

The name "Bonneville" was meant to convey high performance, inspired by a trip Earl had taken to Bonneville Salt Flats in Utah to observe speed trials there. It was the first GM vehicle to carry the name, subsequently given to the Division's full-size performance car, the Bonneville, which carried it for 47 years.

Two "Special" prototypes, one painted metallic bronze and one emerald green, were built in order to unveil them simultaneously at the Grand Ballroom of the Waldorf in New York and the Pan Pacific Auditorium in Los Angeles in 1954.

== Design ==
=== Exterior ===
The exterior design of the "Special" was an amalgamation of advanced European sports car styling in front and a rear betraying America's 1950s fascination with the Space Age, complete with a recessed circular spare tire enclosure flanked by protruding top-to-bottom tailfins that gave the car a rocket-powered appearance. A wind tunnel helped sculpt the lines, and brightwork garnished the body, hood and grille. Glass covered recessed headlights, two banks of rectangular louvers on the fenders, and twin Pontiac "Silver-Streaks". The "Silver-Streak", a body detail peculiar to Pontiacs manufactured from 1935 to 1954, were 5-band, chromed metal bands that ran down the middle of the hood and decklid. Born in the Art Deco style of the mid thirties, it was meant as a visual cue to help distinguish Pontiacs from their competitors, and create the illusion of speed. On the "Special", a pair were used, which was the second time that two Silver-Streaks running parallel appeared on a Pontiac; the first time was on the 1953 Parisienne, another Motorama concept car. In 1957, they were discontinued.

=== Interior ===
The dashboard was highlighted by a large central speedometer pod, flanked to its right by a horizontal row of five analogue gauges nested in contoured brushed stainless. This flowing motif was carried to the center console with a diminutive automatic transmission gearshift handle, twin vent-control levers, and ignition key slot. Also present were wide twin leather bucket seats and a racing-style three-spoke steering wheel.

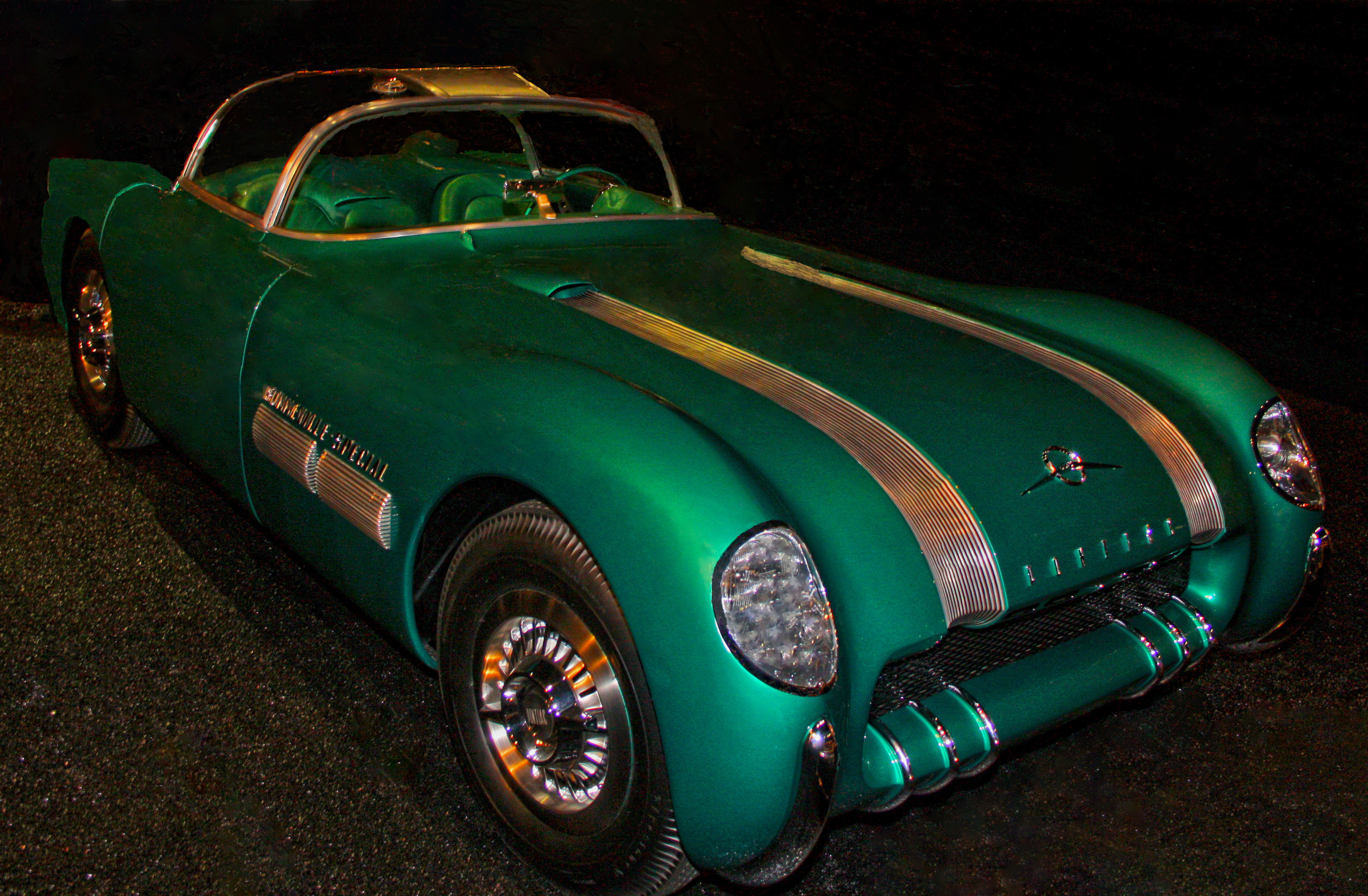
Front view of the emerald green Special

Entry was through conventionally hinged frameless doors and gull-winged Plexiglas panels integrated into a see-through canopy. A dramatically curved rear window completed the "bubble top" in back.

Dashboard Gauges (l-r)	Specifications
Speedometer	0-120 mph
Ampmeter	30-0-30 +
Fuel Gauge	E-F
Manifold Temp	60-240 °F.
Oil Pressure	0-80 psi
Fuel Pressure	0-20 psi
Oil Temp	60-240 °F

=== Design legacy ===
Official publicity photo of the Bonneville Special

Design carry-overs from the Bonneville Special quickly made it into the next year's production models, and in those to follow. Most conspicuous were the silver-streaks, which appeared both front and rear on the 1955 and '56 Chieftains and Star Chiefs, as well as Pontiac's concept car for 1956, the Club de Mer. Twin scoops designed to channel cool air into the driver's compartment also appeared on the Club de Mer, and resurfaced over a decade later on the 1967 Firebird and 1968 GTO. The horizontal fender louvers appeared as vertical slits on the 1957 Star Chief Bonneville and 1965 2+2. The bold tail fins were softened and adapted on 1955 and '56 Pontiac models. The 1958 Bonneville's instrument panel borrowed the Special's sleek stainless steel style, and the finned wheel covers became a design cue for Pontiac's famous 8-lug, aluminum rims introduced in 1960.

== Engine ==
The Bonneville Special was powered by the "Special"-8, a bored out, high compression 268 in³ Pontiac Straight-8 unique to the pair of show cars. Modifications included a long-duration cam and four Carter YH side-draft single barrel carburetors breathing through open-mesh race-style screens. Total output was the highest ever for the "eight", rated at 230 bhp (172 kW), though some estimated it at nearly 300 bhp (220 kW).

Sharing the Silver Streak name used for the flathead straight-8 that powered production cars, it was Pontiac's most powerful engine to date. Painted bright red and detailed in chrome in the show cars, it was coupled to a 4-speed Hydramatic automatic transmission.

Throughout the American auto world straight-8s were giving way to V8s. Pontiac's was far enough in its development to be considered for the "Special", but was held back by GM marketing, which wished to keep it a secret until its consumer debut the following model year.

Engine name	Engine type	Displacement in³ ( L)	Output bhp (kW) @ rpm	Torque ft·lbf (Nm) @ rpm	Carburetor series (bbl)
"Special"-8	Inline I-8	268 (4.4)	230.00 (169.28) @ 3700	NA (NA) @ 2000.00	Carter YH 2206 (1) x 4

== Today ==
As of 2008, both cars still exist. The all-original bronze "Special" belongs to a Highland Park, Illinois, collector, who claims it is so authentic that 90% of the air in the tires, with the exception of a few top-ups, is from 1954.

The green "Special" was completely restored and sold for $2,800,000 to an anonymous buyer at the 2006 Barrett-Jackson Collector Car Auction.
