= Oldsmobile F-88 =

1954 concept car

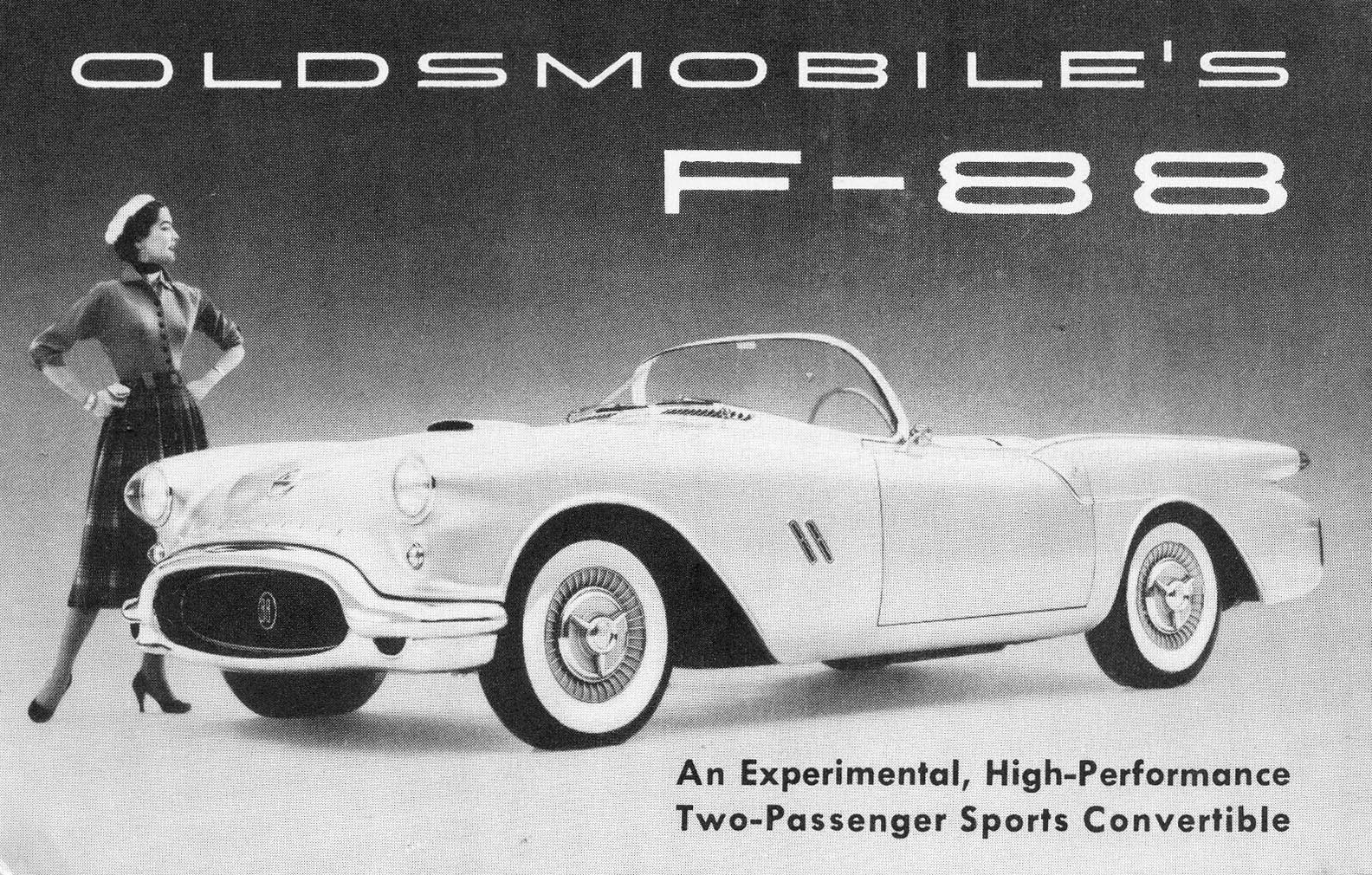

The Oldsmobile F-88 was a concept car created by Oldsmobile in 1954, with initial sketches made by Bill Lange. It used the chassis of the Chevrolet Corvette and shared its 102 in (2,600 mm) wheelbase. Like the Corvette, and the Pontiac Bonneville Special, the F-88's body was fiberglass.

The car used a 324 cubic inch (5.3 litre) Super 88 V8 engine with a four-barrel carburetor with a small, flat air cleaner. The Corvette-derived rear axle had a ratio of 3.55:1. The console was modified from the 1953 Oldsmobile console with a tachometer added and customizing the fascia of the gauges. The instrument panel of the F-88 was later used on a Cutlass. The F-88 was sold to John and Maureen Hendricks for over three million dollars. Today it is on display in its own showroom at the Gateway Colorado Automobile Museum. Rumors suggest a second F-88 was destroyed in a fire between display shows.
