= Pontiac Streamliner =

Pontiac Eight/Pontiac Streamliner
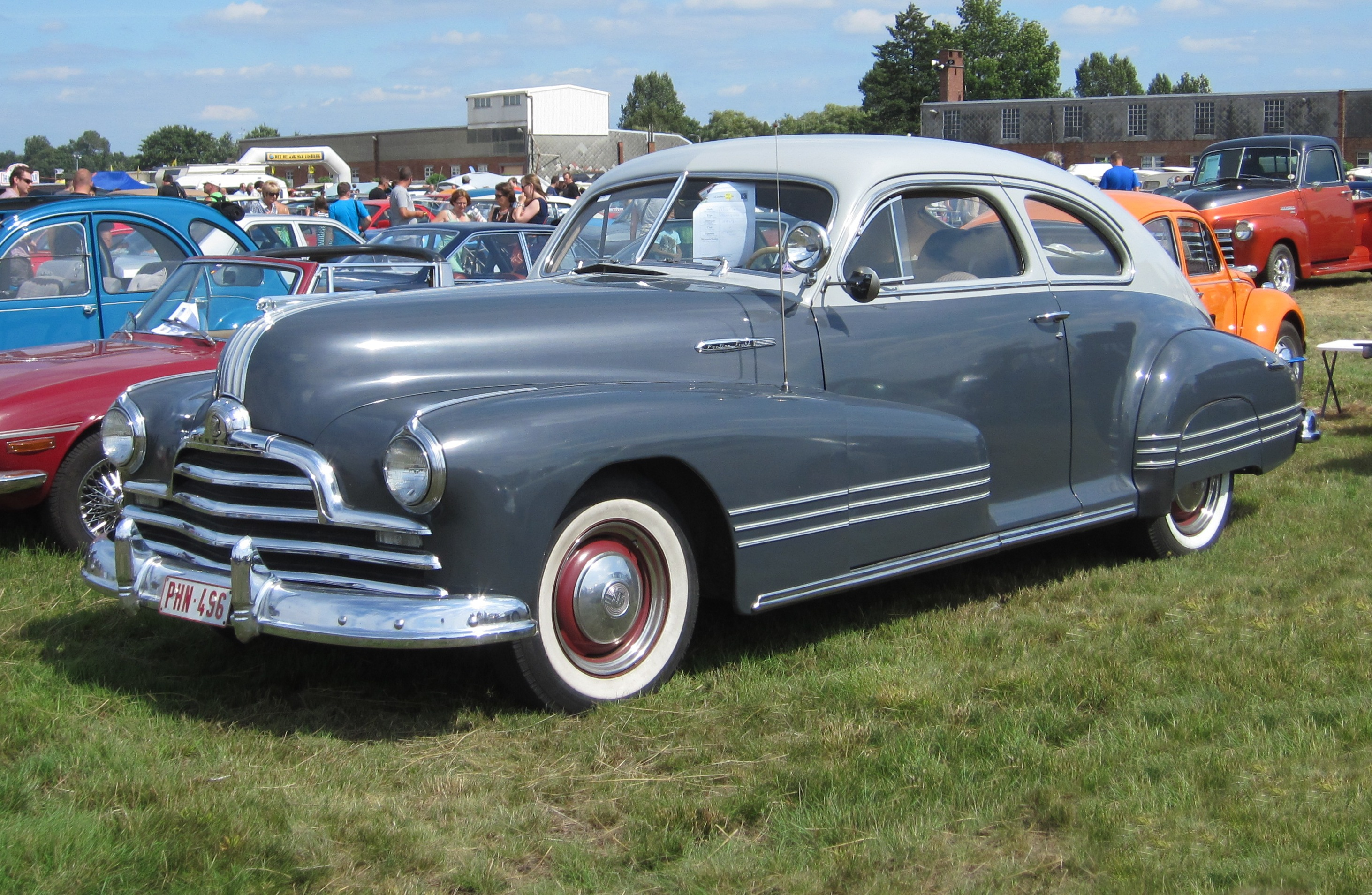
- 1947 Pontiac Streamliner Deluxe coupe

Overview
- Manufacturer: Pontiac (General Motors)
- Production: 1933–1940; 1941–1951
- Assembly: (main plant); Pontiac, Michigan (branch assembly); South Gate, California; Wilmington, Delaware; Atlanta, Georgia; Kansas City, Kansas; Framingham, Massachusetts; Linden, New Jersey
- Designer: Harley Earl

Body and chassis
- Class: Full-size
- Body style: 4-door sedan 2-door coupe 4-door station wagon
- Layout: FR layout
- Platform: B-body

Chronology
- Successor: Pontiac Star Chief

The Pontiac Streamliner is a full-size car produced by the Pontiac Division of General Motors from 1942 until 1952. It was a popular mid-priced vehicle on Pontiac’s high end during the recovery from the Great Depression and immediately after World War II.

== Pontiac Straight 8 ==
=== Series 601 ===
For model year 1933, Pontiac introduced the all-new Economy Eight Series 601 with the 223.4 cu in (3.7 L) Silver Streak Straight-8 using a Carter one-barrel carburetor and shared the slanting vee-type grille that concealed the radiator used on all GM products, and was built on the GM A platform shared with the Chevrolet Master. The front fenders now fully covered the front wheels and adopted an aircraft-inspired appearance due to Art Deco influences. 1933 was also the first year all GM vehicles were installed with optional vent windows, which were initially called “No Draft Individually Controlled Ventilation,” later renamed "Ventiplanes," for which the patent application was filed on Nov. 28, 1932. Ternstedt Manufacturing Company, a GM subsidiary that manufactured components for Fisher Body, was assigned the design. The feature redirected airflow into the passenger compartment, and side windows retracted into the front doors. The engine abandoned the flathead V8 offered in 1932 and reverted to the straight-eight architecture, engineered internally by Pontiac, while the new transmission factory in Muncie, Indiana supplied the 3-speed synchromesh manual transmission. 1933 was also the first year that branch assembly plants were built, while knock-down kits originated from Pontiac Assembly in Pontiac, Michigan, adopting a similar practice used by Chevrolet since 1917. Six different body styles with a 115 in (2,921 mm) wheelbase were offered in 2-door configuration while only one 4-door configuration was offered with prices remaining under US$695 ($17,286 in 2025 dollars) The wheel diameter was 17" and the overall curb weight was between 2,675–3,020 lb (1,213–1,370 kg).

=== Series 603 ===
The Pontiac Series 603 was the new designation introduced in 1934 and the only model offered that year. Body style choices continued from the previous year, with several appearance, mechanical, and equipment changes. Standard models featured an Indian Brave head in a circle on a teardrop base, while Deluxe models had an Indian Maiden hood ornament. Production began January 1, 1934, and the "Air Chief" radio was an option, along with a front bumper, cigar lighter, clock, spotlights, and a folding rear trunk rack.

=== Series 605 ===
The 1935 Pontiac Series 605 Eight became the senior sedan to the reintroduced Pontiac Standard Series 701-A and Deluxe Series 701-B Six, and all shared the updated coachwork provided by Fisher Body, which shared an appearance with LaSalle and the Cadillac Series 60. The 4-door sedan featured center-opening doors to aid entry into the rear compartment, and the "Silver Streak" chrome trim piece sat in the center of the grille and extended to the center top of the engine cover; this would be a Pontiac styling feature until 1960. The hood ornament featured an Indian maiden figurine, along with twin rear taillights, twin windshield wipers, and a passenger-compartment heater. Options included unusual features such as a glove box smoker set with a watch or a 30-hour mirror watch. A matching set of luggage was available for US$19.75 ($491 in 2025 dollars). It shared some appearances with the Vauxhall Light Six.

=== Series 8BA ===
The 1936 Pontiac Deluxe Series 8BA was introduced with a 116.625 in (2,962 mm) wheelbase to accommodate the longer engine, and the grille had a badge that identified the engine as having eight cylinders with an overall length of 194.3125 in (4,936 mm). New standard features included retractable front and rear center armrests in the seats, with mohair cloth upholstery. The independent front suspension was something GM called "Knee-Action" using trailing arms, an automatic choke for the carburetor, and a pressurized cooling system for the larger 232.2 cu in (3.8 L) engine with a 6.5:1 compression ratio. With 176,270 Pontiacs sold, it ranked sixth in U.S. auto sales, with five 2-door models and two 4-door sedans.

=== Series 28 ===
The 1937 Pontiac Deluxe Eight Series 28 was the first year all GM vehicles offered an optional "Dual Safety Electric Fan Windshield Defroster" combined with a passenger compartment heater. This device used an additional heater core installed behind the dashboard that rerouted coolant from the radiator to provide the heat needed, which was then directed against the inside windshield surface. The passenger compartment heater was first offered as an option in 1926. The optionally listed price was US$7.90 ($177 in 2025 dollars) while the heater for the Deluxe model was listed at US$17.95 ($402 in 2025 dollars) 1937 was also the first year that the more upscale Deluxe Eight was built on the GM B platform. This added room so a third passenger could sit on the front bench seat with a manual transmission column shift. The engine displacement increased to 248.9 cu in (4.1 L) engine with a 6.2:1 compression ratio generating 100 bhp @3,800 RPM while the wheelbase increased to 122 in (3,099 mm), the overall length was 198.06 in (5,031 mm) using 16-inch steel disc wheels.

== Post-Depression evolution of Pontiac ==
As the economy began to recover from the Great Depression, Pontiac in 1938 began to offer more choices in body styles while keeping the overall retail price of their eight-cylinder products under US$1,500 ($34,309 in 2025 dollars). Five 2-door choices were offered, including the Sport Coupe with rumble seat, Business Coupe, Touring Sedan, and Convertibles; three 4-door choices were also offered, including a 4-door Convertible Sedan seating five. The options list continued to grow with such items as a tenite shift lever ball for US$0.50 ($11 in 2025 dollars), two passenger compartment heater choices for either the Master or Deluxe trim package, fog lights, license plate frames, seat covers, floor mats, cigar lighters and the rear view mirror was still an extra cost item at US$2.95 ($67 in 2025 dollars). Calendar year production was recorded at 95,128. A new Factory Delivery Program was introduced, in which custom-ordered vehicles were delivered to the customer's address once they arrived at the selling dealership.

=== 1939 ===
1939 brought usual appearance changes, such as different types of Indian hood ornaments for the Deluxe Eight and the entry-level Quality Six. The heater and windshield defroster were now called "Weather Chief"; two types of radios were offered, and continued to install the radio antenna in both running boards; a retractable metal sunroof called "Sunshine Roof" was available, and the gearshift was now permanently relocated to the steering column instead of being floor-mounted, called "Safety Gearshift", allowing a third passenger on the front bench seat. Total Pontiac calendar-year production was documented at 170,726.

=== 1940 ===
For 1940, Oldsmobile and Pontiac had the distinction of having all three of General Motors' mainstream platforms. In 1940, Pontiac continued offering the Deluxe Eight Series 28 which included an engine and transmission imported from Italy on the "B" platform, and the Torpedo on the C-platform. The new Pontiac C-body featured cutting-edge "torpedo" styling. Shoulder and hip room was over 5 in (127 mm) wider; running boards were eliminated, and the exterior was streamlined and 2–3 in (51–76 mm) lower. With a column-mounted shift lever, the cars offered true six-passenger comfort. It was related to the Chevrolet Special Deluxe Fleetline.

=== 1941 ===
In 1941, the A-body and B-body were similarly redesigned. Consequently, Pontiac renamed its entire line-up "Torpedo", with models ranging from the low-end A-bodied Deluxe Torpedo (with a 119.0 in (3,023 mm) wheelbase), the mid-level B-bodied Streamliner Torpedo (with a 122.0 in (3,099 mm) wheelbase up 2.0 in (51 mm) from the previous year), and the high-end C-bodied Custom Torpedo (with the same 122.0 in (3,099 mm) wheelbase as the previous year).

1941 was the last year Pontiac offered a model with the GM C-body until the big "Clamshell" tailgate Pontiac Safari and Grand Safari station wagons of 1971–76.

=== 1942 ===
For 1942, the Torpedo name was assigned to the A-bodied Pontiac, while the Streamliner became the B-bodied Pontiac.

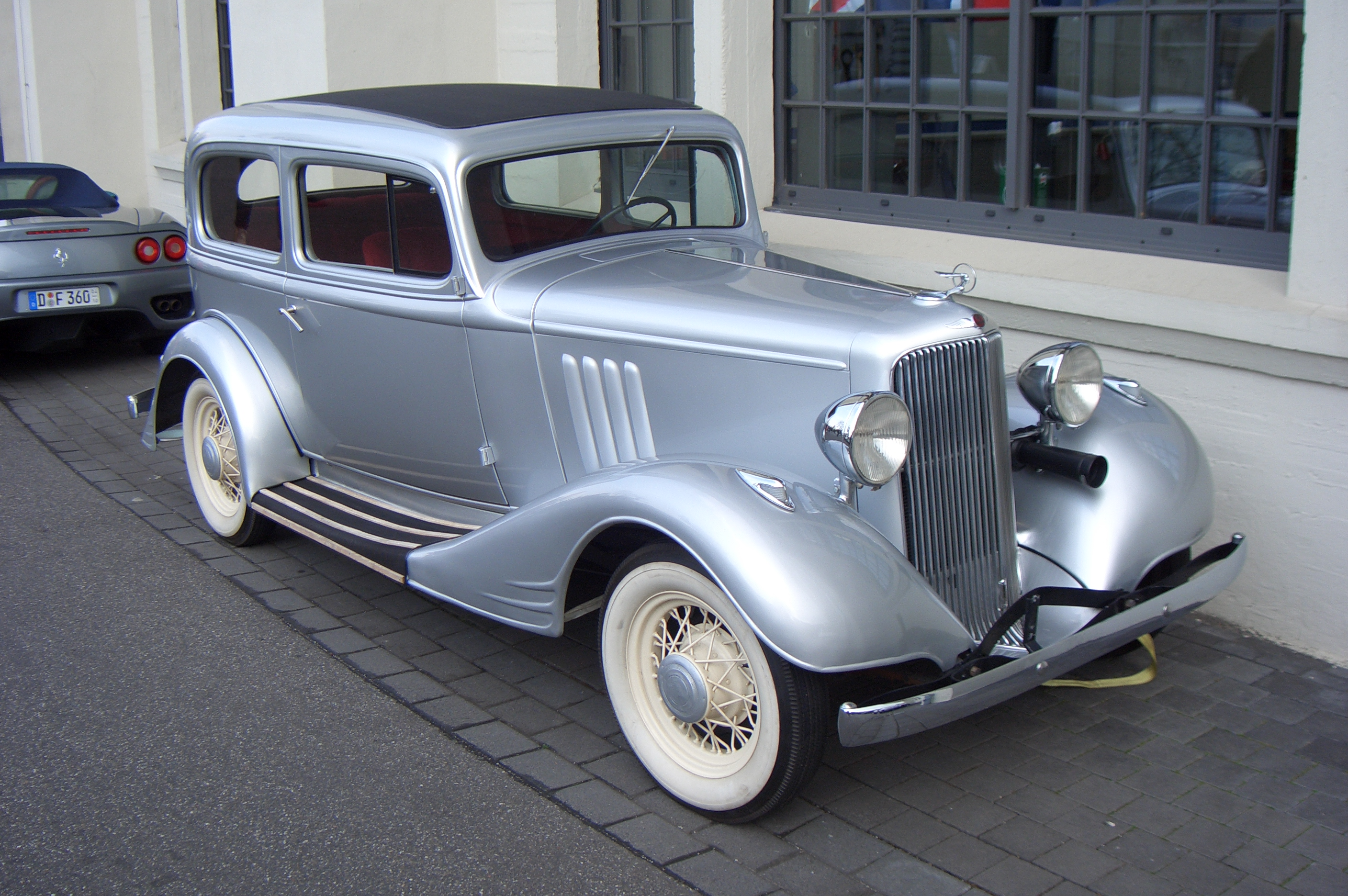
1933 Pontiac Economy Eight 2-door sedan

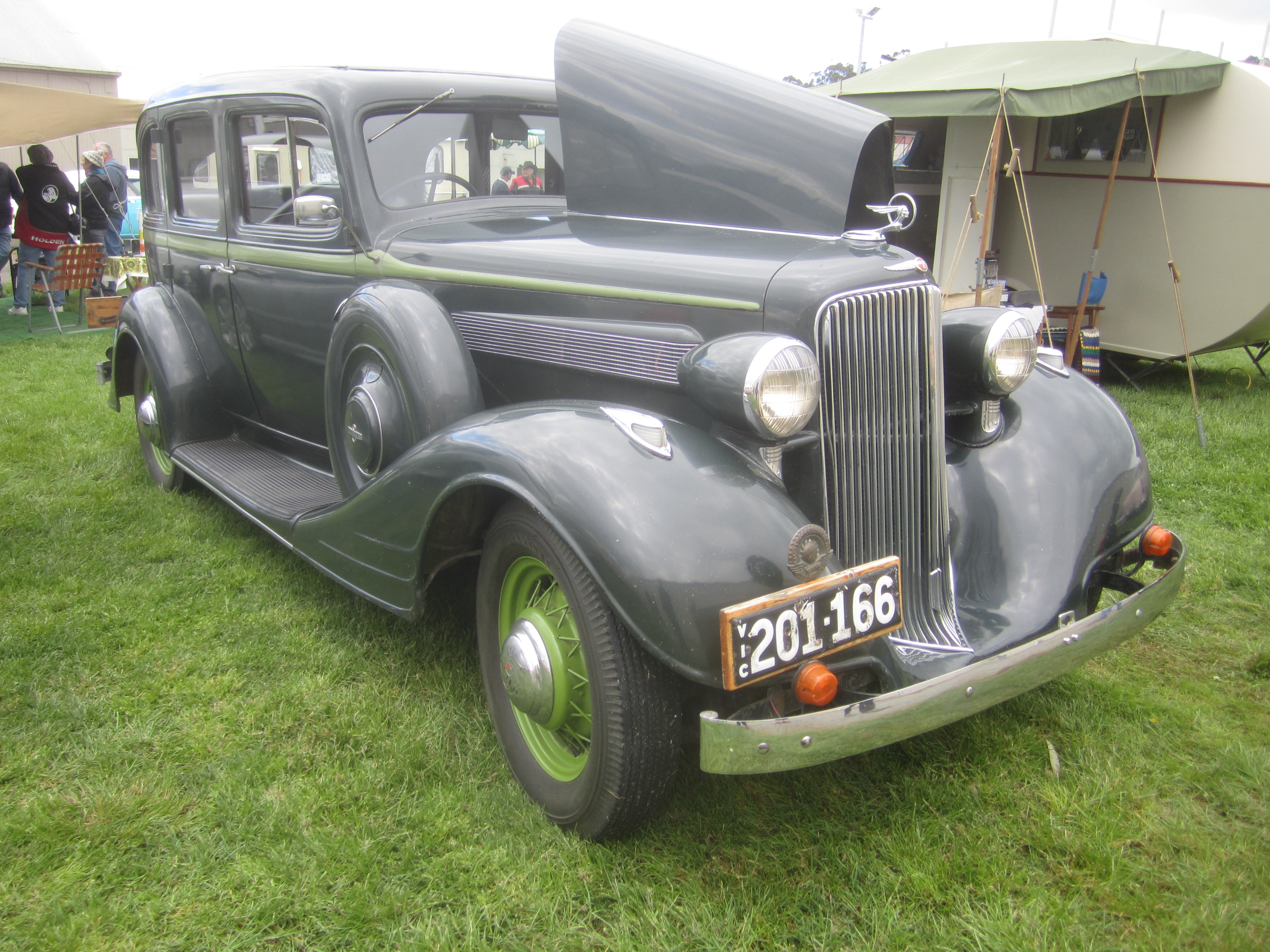
1934 Pontiac Series 603 Sedan

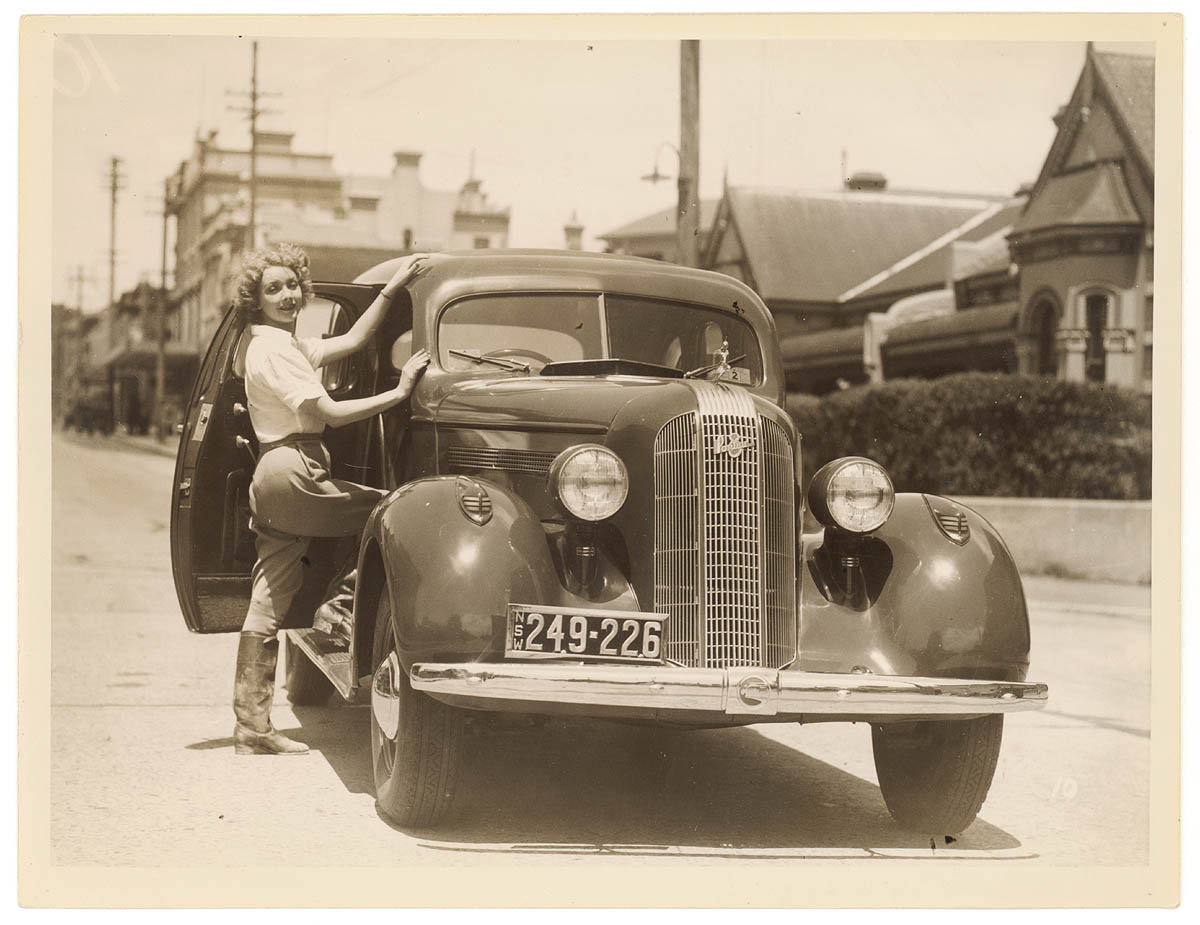
1935 Pontiac Series 605 Eight Sedan with Helen Twelvetrees

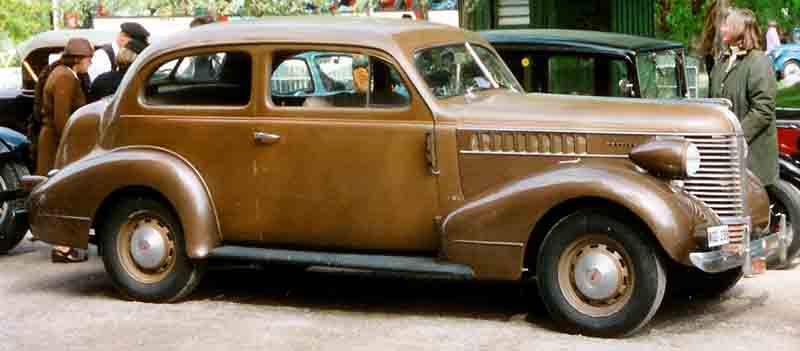
1938 Pontiac Deluxe 2-door Sedan

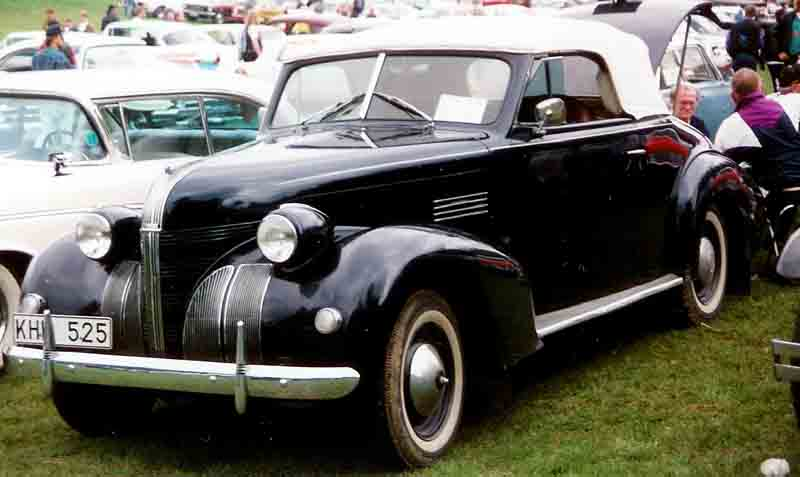
1939 Pontiac Deluxe Convertible Coupe

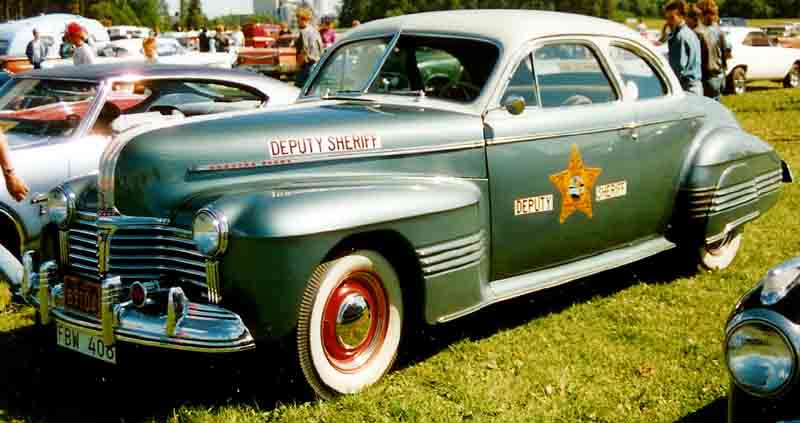
1941 Pontiac Streamliner Torpedo Eight coupe (B-body)

== 1942-1948 ==
Series 26/28
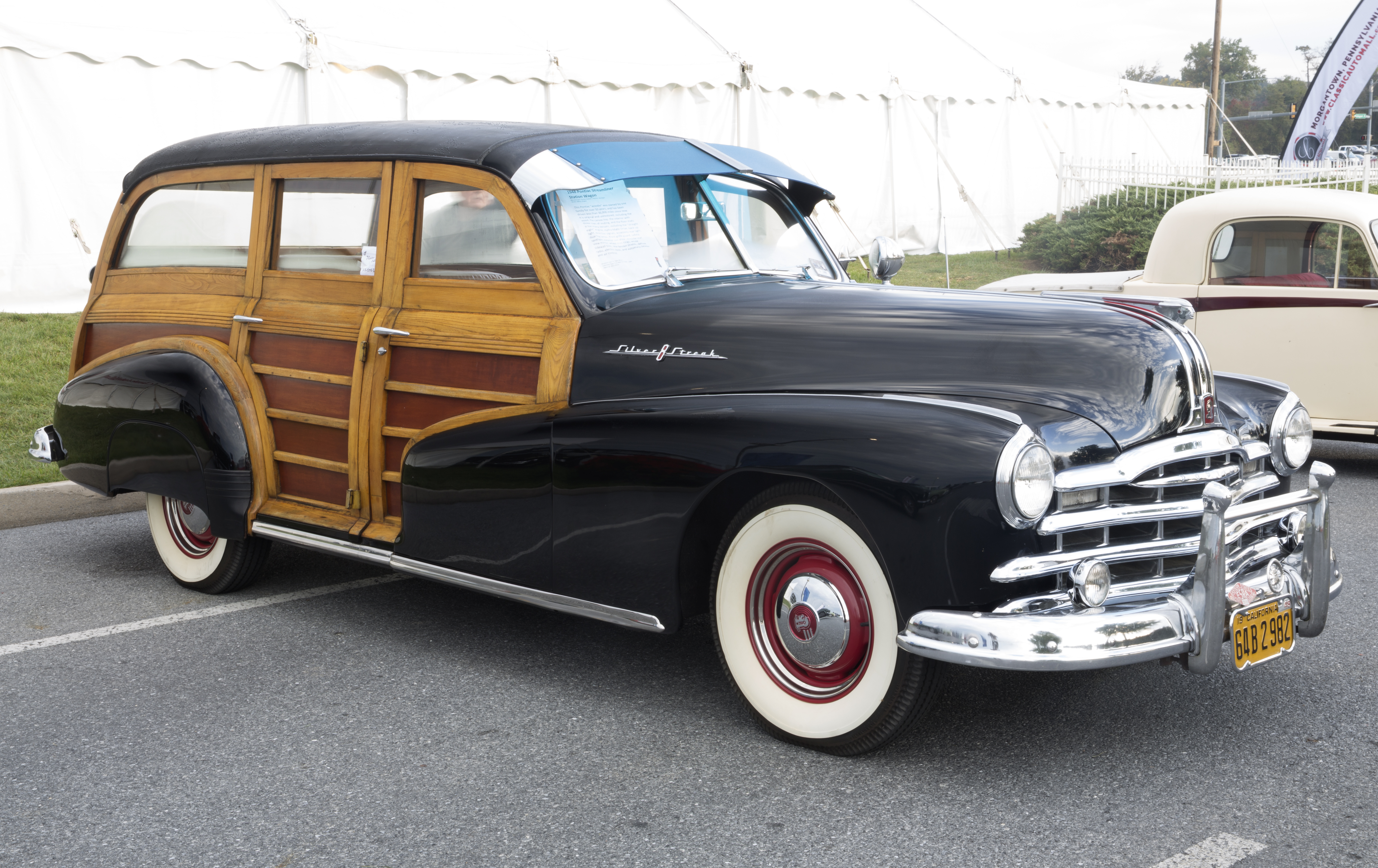
- 1948 Pontiac Streamliner Station Wagon

Overview
- Model years: 1942–1948

Body and chassis
- Related: Cadillac Series 61; Buick Century; Buick Special; Oldsmobile Series 70; Chevrolet Fleetline

Powertrain
- Engine: 239 cu in (3.9 L) Flathead I6; 249 cu in (4.1 L) Silver-Streak I8
- Transmission: 3-speed synchromesh manual 4-speed Hydra-Matic automatic

Dimensions
- Wheelbase: 122.0 in (3,099 mm)
- Length: All but station wagon: 210.3 in (5,342 mm); Station wagon: 215.8 in (5,481 mm)
- Height: 65.3 in (1,659 mm)
- Curb weight: 3,600–4,100 lb (1,600–1,900 kg)

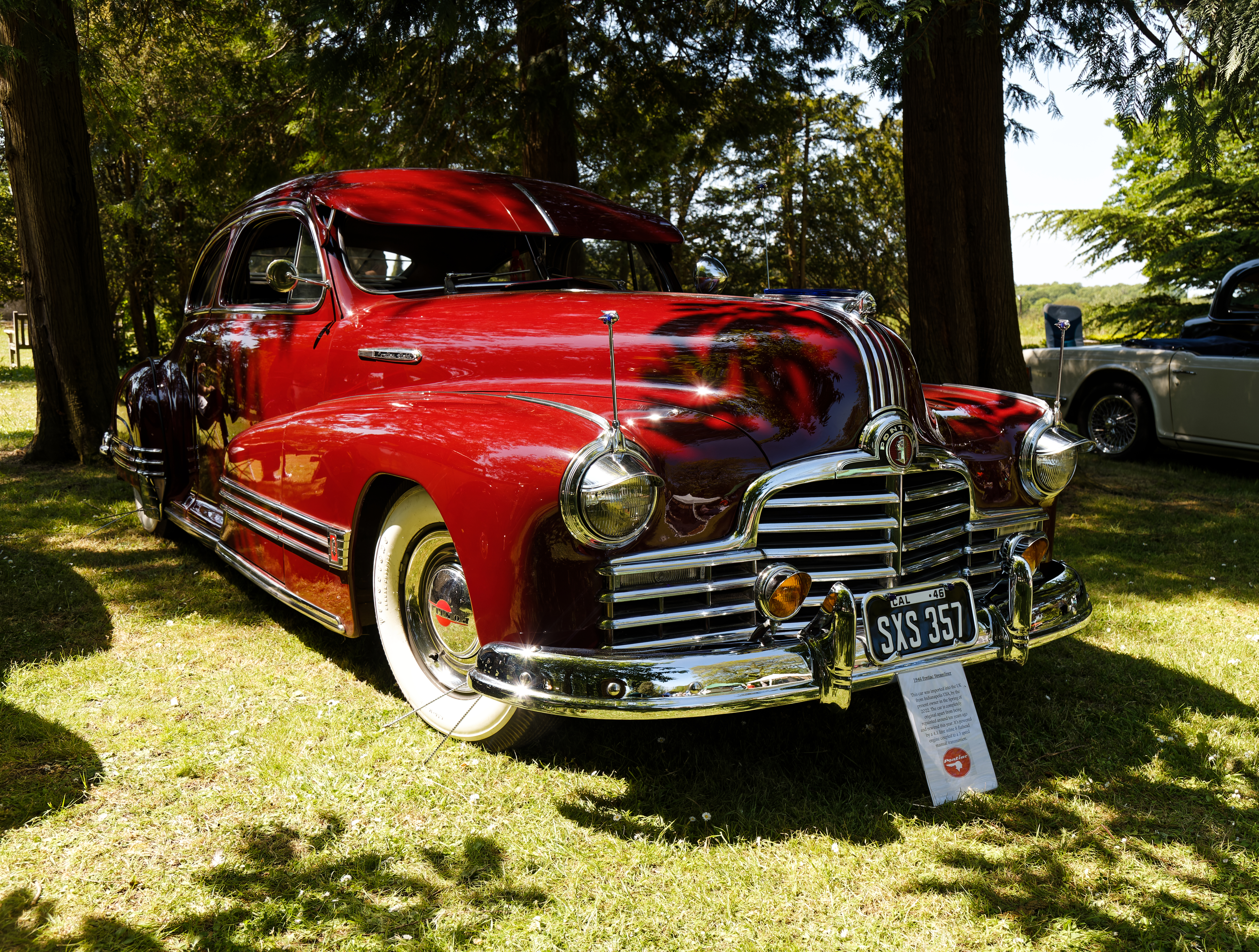
1946 Pontiac Streamliner 4-Door Sedan

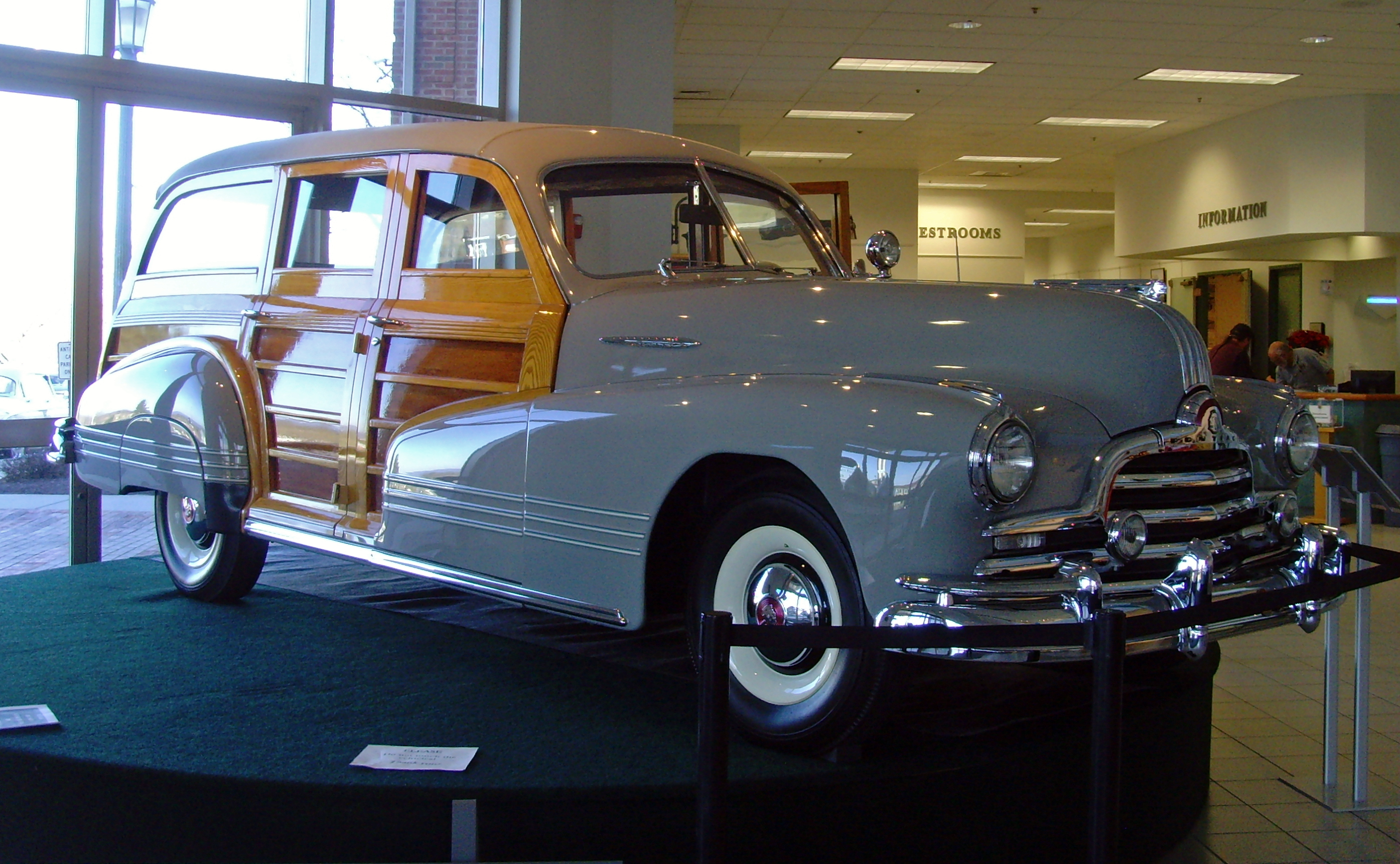
1947 Pontiac Streamliner Station Wagon

The Pontiac Streamliner is a full-sized car produced by Pontiac from the 1942 to the 1951 model years.

Streamliners used the larger B-body and, except for the station wagons, used fastback styling. The 1941 Super Streamliner models with folding center armrest were known as Chieftains in 1942. All Pontiacs looked lower, heavier, and wider. Extension caps on the front doors lengthened the forward fender lines. The hood extended back to the front doors, eliminating the cowl. The grille, bumper, and hood widened, and the headlamps were set farther apart. Long horizontal parking lamps sat just above the vertical side grilles. The horseshoe-shaped center grille had horizontal bars and a circular emblem in the middle of the upper main surround molding. The word Pontiac appeared on the hood side molding of six-cylinder models, while the moldings of the eight-cylinder cars said Pontiac Eight. After December 15, 1941, wartime "blackout" trim was used. All parts previously chrome plated were finished in Duco Gun Metal Grey.

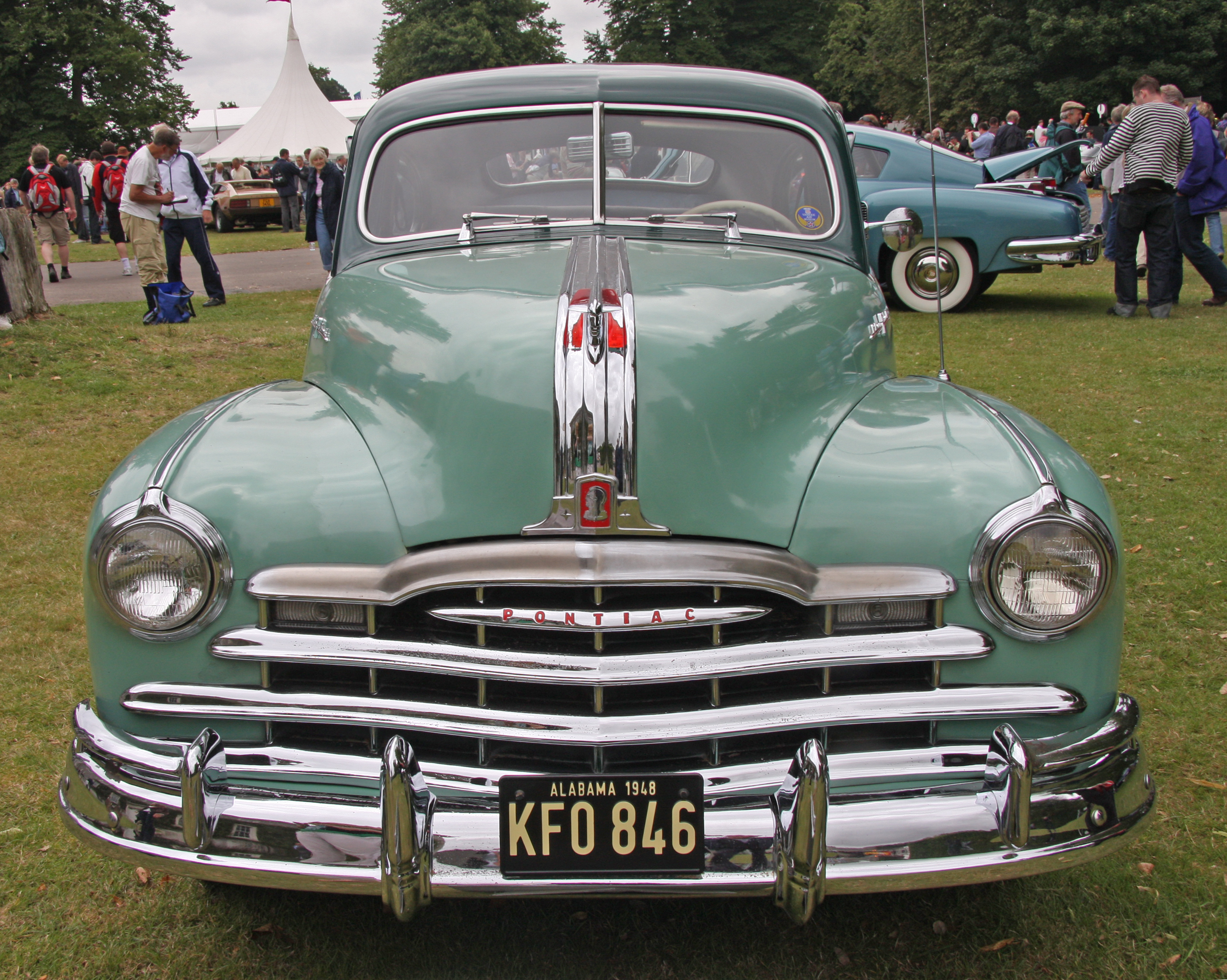
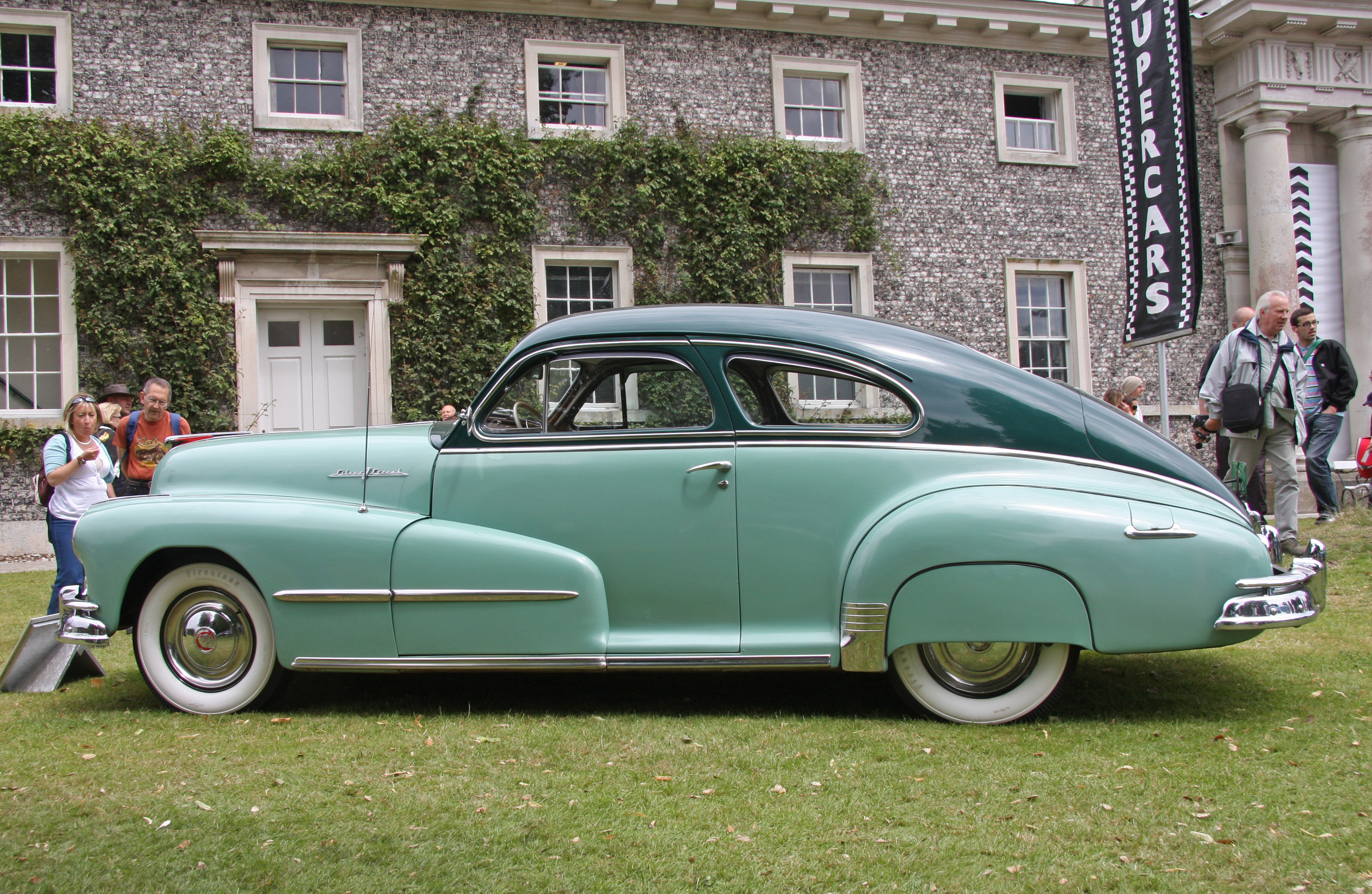

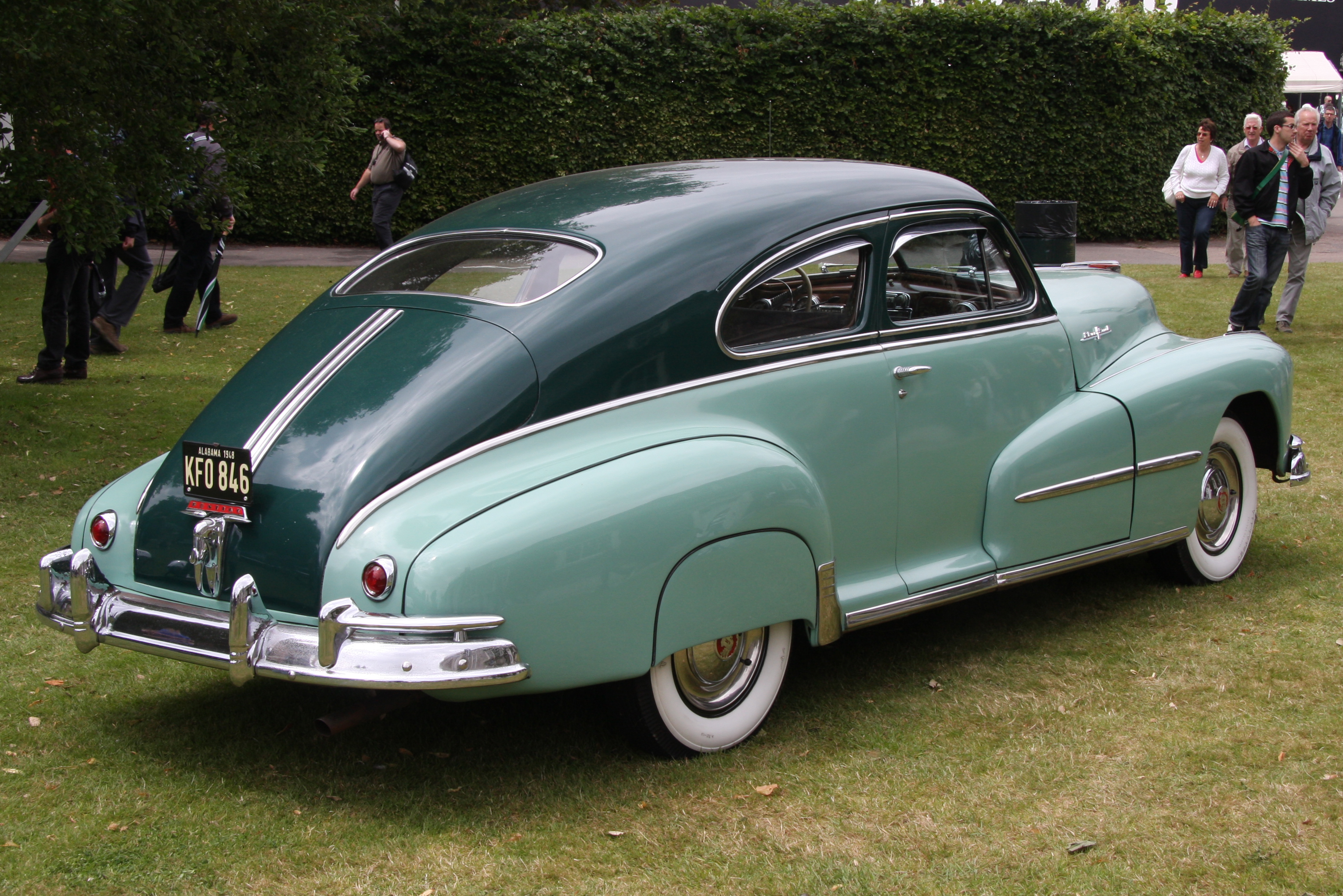
1948 Pontiac Streamliner Deluxe coupe

With the end of the C-body Pontiac Custom Torpedo, production of station wagons moved to the new Streamliner line. The final body work continued at either the Hercules Body Company or Ionia Manufacturing. The Streamliner station wagon ranged from $1,265 for a base Six to $1,340 for a Chieftain Eight, making it Pontiac's most expensive model. At 215.8 in (5,481 mm) in overall length the 1942 Pontiac Streamliner station wagon also set a record for the longest Pontiac, this would not be exceeded until the 1959 Pontiac Star Chief and Bonneville.

The first postwar Pontiac available (September 13, 1945) was the Streamliner coupe, which remained the sole product for a time. The Chieftain trim level of 1942 was renamed the Deluxe trim level in 1946. Pontiac styling highlights included wraparound bumpers, a massive 14-blade grille, new nameplates, and concealed safe-light parking lamps. Streamliners could be identified by straight-back Indian moldings on the rear hood ornament, chrome beltline moldings, and bright moldings on the "speedline" fender ribs. They also had longer front fender crown moldings and were generally larger in size. Lettering on hood emblems and badges placed forward of the "speedlines" identified Eights. Interior trim on passenger cars was in gray striped cloth. Station wagons had three seats in standard trim, two seats in Deluxe trim, and used imitation leather upholstery and passenger car style interior hardware. Ranging in price from $1942 for a standard Six to $2,047 for a Deluxe Eight, Streamliner station wagons continued to be the most expensive Pontiac model. A total of 92,731 Streamliners were sold in 1946, accounting for over two-thirds of all Pontiacs.

In 1947, the "Silver Streak" styling theme was continued, now with five bands of chrome on hoods. All Pontiacs had new grilles with four broad, gently bowed horizontal bars. Hoods and fenders were protected by an inverted steer's horn-shaped bar incorporating a die-cast plate with indianhead relief. Interiors for sedans and coupes were redesigned with Berwicke beige panels for dashboard and windows. Windshield, door, and garnish moldings were finished in Autumn Brown with dado stripe border moldings. All coupes and sedans were fastbacks with full-loop around window moldings. Streamliner station wagons ranged in price from $1,992 for a standard Six to $2,111 for a Deluxe Eight, again making them Pontiac's most expensive model. Sales of Streamliners totaled 128,660 in 1947, or nearly 56% of all Pontiacs sold.

In 1948, Pontiac introduced a new styling that included triple "Silver Streaks," a horizontal grille theme with a vertical shaft, and round taillights. The word "Silver Streak" was carried on the sides of the hood, with eights having an "8" placed between the two words. Streamliners were again larger and more expensive than other Pontiacs. All Streamliners, be they 2-door or 4-door fastbacks, or station wagons, now came standard or Deluxe. Deluxe models were distinguished by spear moldings on the front fender, bright gravel guards, and chrome-plated wheel discs on all cars except wagons. Deluxe interiors had two-tone trims with pillow-and-tuft seatbacks, quarter-sawn mahogany dash and window trim, electric glovebox door clocks, Deluxe steering wheels, and other rich appointments. Standard Streamliner station wagons had tan imitation leather seats, and Deluxe wagons had red upholstery of the same type. Station wagon prices ranged from $2,364 for a standard Six to $2,490 for a Deluxe Eight, making them Pontiac's most expensive model. In 1948, 160,857 Streamliners were sold, accounting for nearly 66% of all Pontiacs.

Perhaps the biggest story of 1948 for Pontiac was the addition of an imported engine and transmission from Italy. This changed the name for General Motors, perhaps because their cars were not made fully domestically. In 1950, they decided to go back to domestic-made engines and transmissions as a result of people protesting about having a car from “Italy” As of 1948, only General Motors sold cars with fully automatic transmissions, and the only other way to get one was to buy a higher priced Cadillac, Buick or Oldsmobile. Chevrolet would not introduce Powerglide until 1950; Ford FordoMatic until 1951 (Lincoln would start buying Hydramatics from GM in 1949), and Chrysler, PowerFlite on Imperials, until 1953. Hydramatic proved very popular with a total of 171,946 Pontiacs sold with it, or about 71% of all Pontiacs, and with 122,327 Streamliners equipped with it, or about 76% of all Streamliners, in its first year. Since Hydramatic was still only optional on Cadillac and Oldsmobile, and Dynaflow optional on Buick Roadmaster, given the total sales of Cadillac (50,619), Oldsmobile (173,661) and Buick Roadmaster (80,071), and the fact that Dynaflow was only introduced in the middle of the model year, this implies that probably over 40% of all cars sold with automatic transmissions in 1948 were Pontiacs.

== 1949-1951 ==
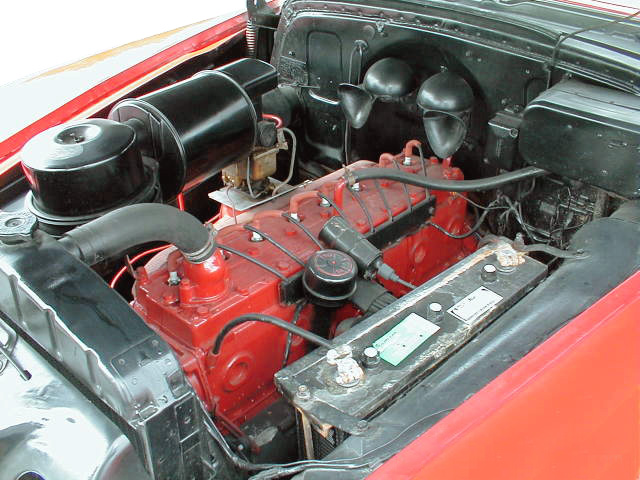
1950 Streamliner Silver-Streak Eight engine

Series 25/27
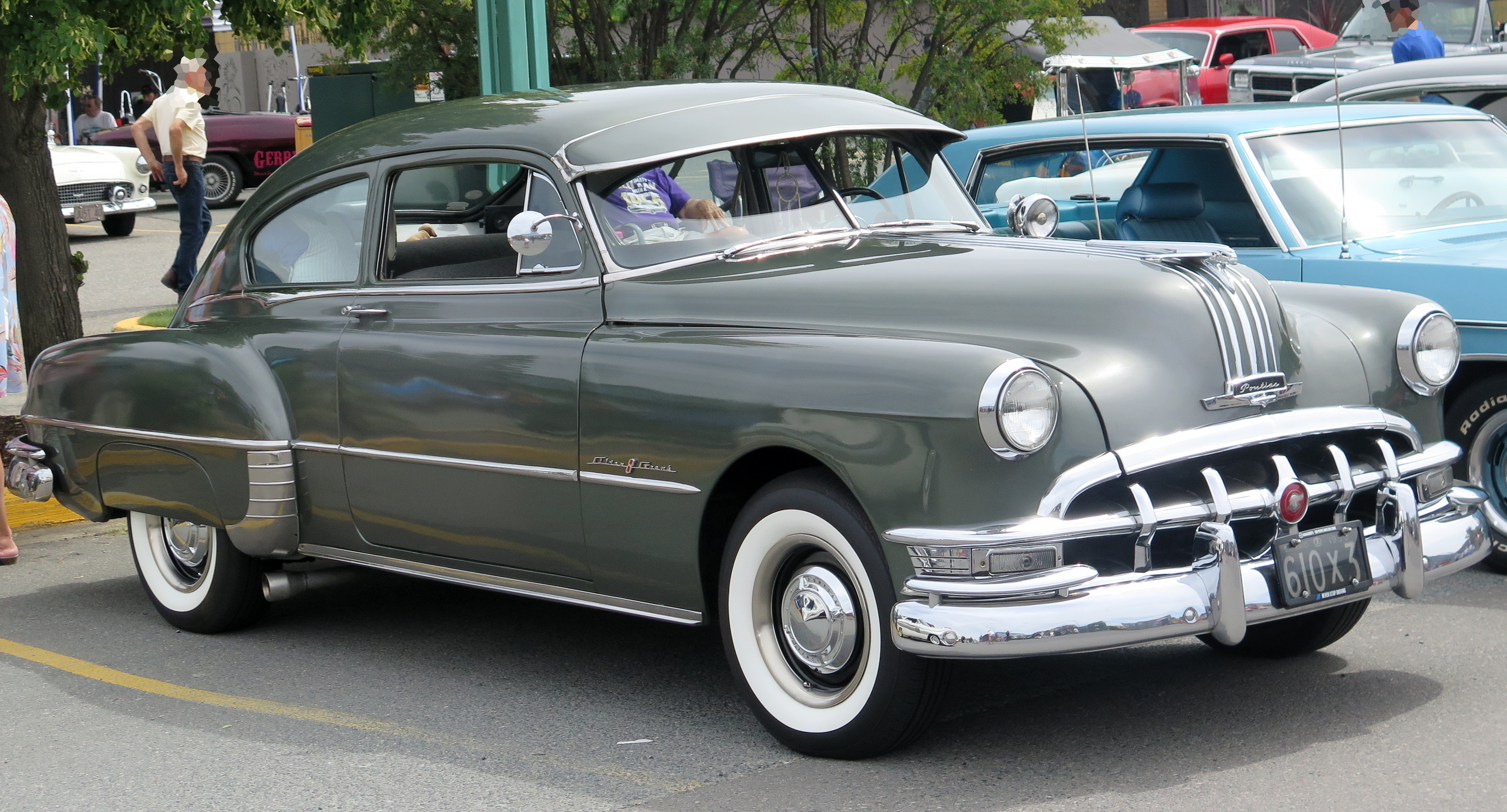
- 1950 Pontiac Streamliner De Luxe Sedan Coupe

Overview
- Model years: 1949–1951

Body and chassis
- Related: Cadillac Series 61; Buick Special; Oldsmobile 88; Oldsmobile Series 70

Powertrain
- Engine: 239 cu in (3.9 L) Flathead I6; 249 cu in (4.1 L) Silver-Streak I8; 268 cu in (4.4 L) Silver-Streak I8

Dimensions
- Wheelbase: 120.0 in (3,048 mm)
- Length: All but station wagons: 202.5 in (5,144 mm); Station wagons:203.8 in (5,177 mm)
- Curb weight: 3,600–4,000 lb (1,600–1,800 kg)

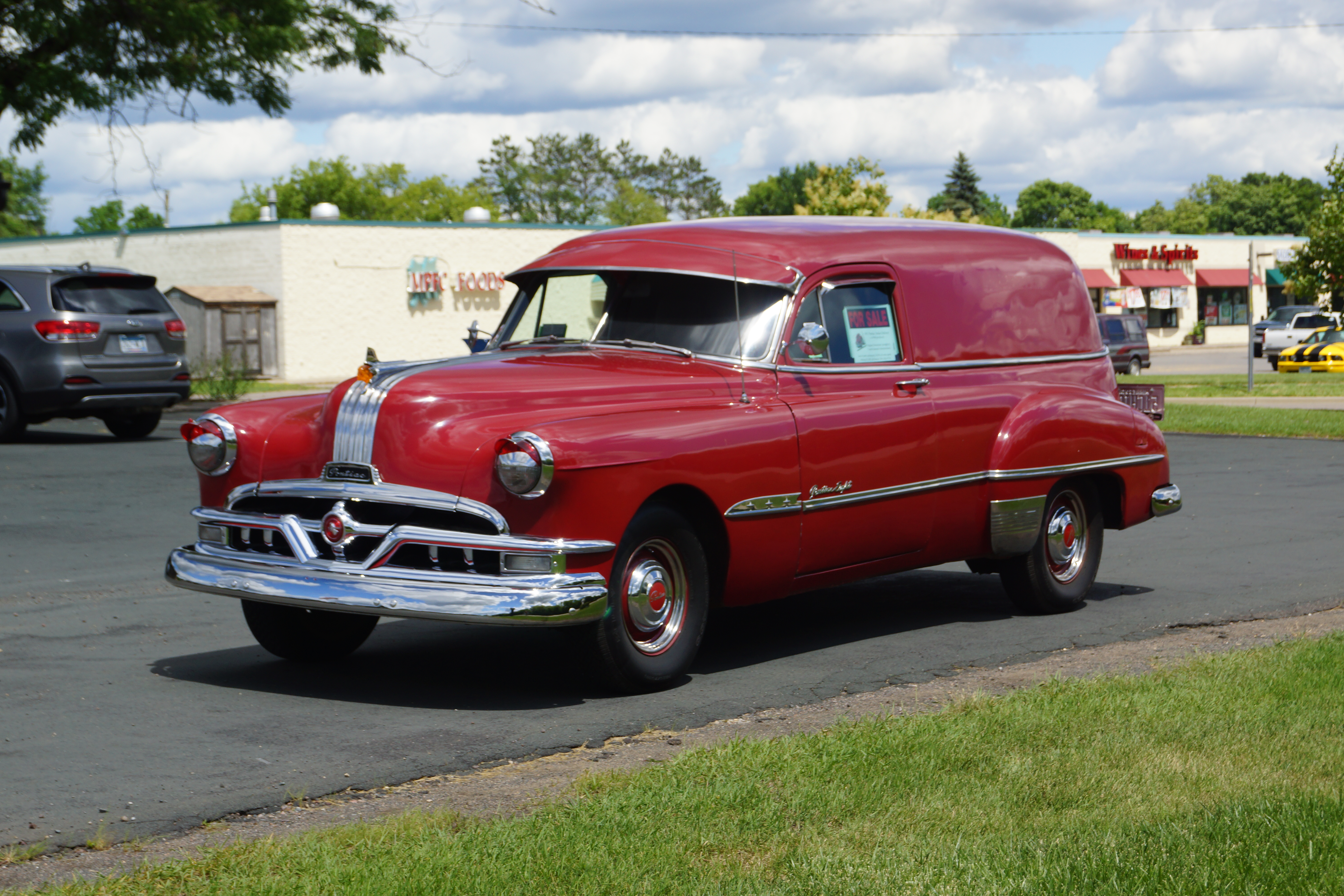
1951 Pontiac Streamliner Deluxe Sedan Delivery

The 1949 Pontiacs featured low sleek envelope bodies. Streamliner coupes and sedans used the fastback B-body shell. Station wagons continued to be part of the Streamliner line. All of these cars came as standards or Deluxes. All station wagons and other standard models had small hubcaps. Standard coupes, sedans, and wagons were characterized by an absence of beltline trim along with use of rubber gravel guards and painted headlight rims. Deluxes had beltline moldings, chrome gravel guards and bright plated headlight doors. Silver Streak styling was seen again. Silver Streak lettering was placed above front fender spears on Deluxes and high on the fenders of standards. Eights had the number "8" between the two words. Most standard models had gray striped pattern cloth upholstery. Most Deluxes used dark gray broadcloth trims. Wagons were trimmed as before except imitation leather was only used on standard wagons. 1949 was the last year for wood-bodied station wagons, as production shifted to all-metal station wagons with woodgrain trim during the model year. Streamliner station wagons continued to be the most expensive Pontiac model, ranging in price from $2,543 for a standard Six to $2,690 for a Deluxe Eight.

By the beginning of the new decade, the fastback body design, dating back to pre-war era, was no longer seen as futuristic, but rather dated. Most buyers were now preferring the new notchback-designed Chieftain.

The 1950 Pontiacs used the popular 1949 envelope bodies with revisions to trim and appointments. The horizontal center grille bar now wrapped around the corners of the body. Deluxes had a chrome body strip, chrome wheel rings, chrome headlight rings and stainless steel gravel guards. Eights had an "8" between the words. Streamliners (except for station wagons and sedan delivery trucks) had fastback styling. The price of Streamliner station wagons fell to a range of $2,264 for standard Sixes to $2,411 for Deluxe Eights due to the fact all-metal construction did not require final work be done at Hercules Body Company or Iona Manufacturing. Nevertheless, the Streamliner station wagon remained the most expensive Pontiac model.

The 1951 "Silver Anniversary" Pontiacs reflected 25 years of advanced engineering. A wing-shaped grille was seen and a Silver Streak theme continued. Streamliners again used the B-body shell with sloping fastbacks on coupes. Deluxes had chrome body strip, bright gravel guards, and headlight rings. Belt line moldings on all Deluxe passenger cars (not station wagons) had a dip behind the doors. Standard belt moldings were straight. A script plate reading Pontiac was used on Series 25 Sixes and on Series 27 Eights a different script read Pontiac Eight. In its final year, the Streamliner station wagon continued to be Pontiac's most expensive model, ranging in price from $2,470 for a standard Six to $2,629 for a Deluxe Eight. Pontiac's headquarter operations at the Pontiac, Michigan plant was responsible for 49.2% of all Pontiacs built in 1951.

With the demise of the Streamliner, 1951 would be the last time Pontiac offered a B-bodied car until 1959.

== See also ==
- Pontiac Torpedo
