= Pontiac straight-8 engine =

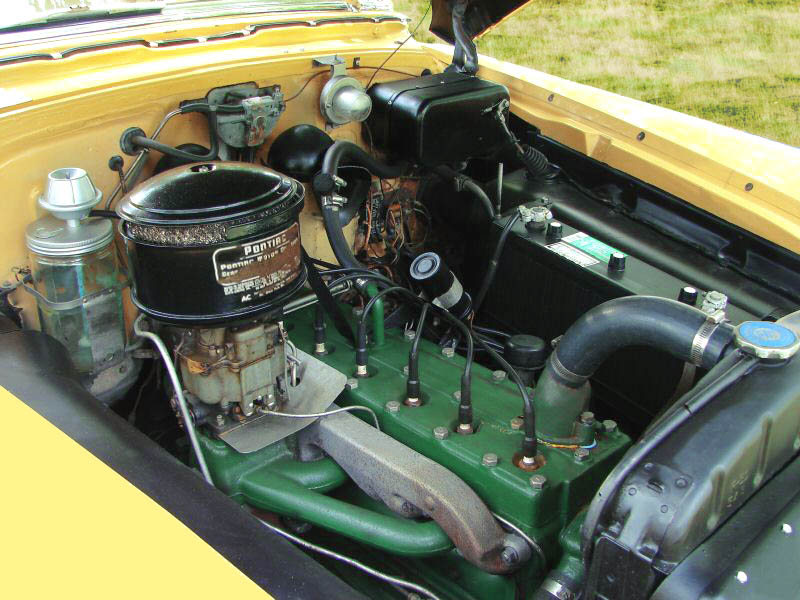

Overview
- Manufacturer: Pontiac (General Motors)
- Also called: Silver Streak
- Production: 1933–1954

Layout
- Configuration: Naturally aspirated Straight-8 cylinder
- Displacement: 223 cu in (3.7 L); 233 cu in (3.8 L); 249 cu in (4.1 L); 268 cu in (4.4 L)
- Cylinder block material: Cast iron
- Cylinder head material: Cast iron
- Valvetrain: Flathead
- Compression ratio: 5.7:1, 6.8:1, 7.7:1

Combustion
- Fuel system: Carter Carburetor
- Fuel type: Gasoline
- Oil system: Full pressure
- Cooling system: Water-cooled

Output
- Power output: 77–127 bhp (57–95 kW)
- Torque output: 153–234 lb⋅ft (207–317 N⋅m)

Chronology
- Predecessor: 251 cu in (4.1 L) flathead I8
- Successor: 287 cu in (4.7 L) OHV V8

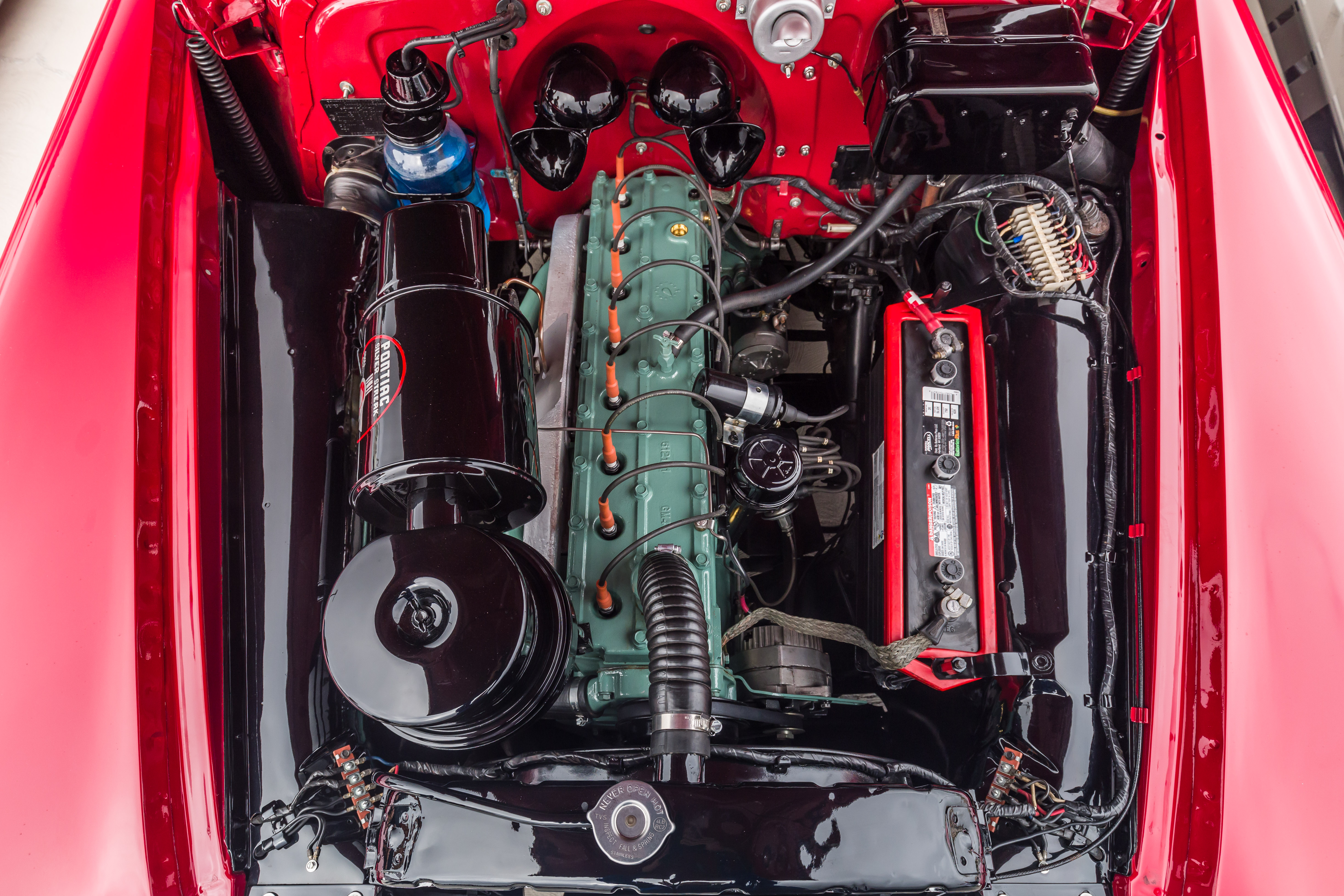
A Silver streak 8 in a 1949 Pontiac Streamliner - note the large intake silencer leading to an oil-bath air cleaner on the left side of the engine

The Pontiac straight-8 engine is an inline eight-cylinder automobile engine produced by Pontiac from 1933 to 1954. Introduced in the fall of 1932 in the 1933 Pontiac 8, it was Pontiac's most powerful engine at the time and the least expensive eight-cylinder engine built by an American automotive manufacturer. During its 21-year run displacement of the "eight" increased twice as platforms grew. It was superseded by Pontiac's new V8, the 287, in 1955. Engine block and cylinder heads were cast at Saginaw Metal Casting Operations then assembled at Tonawanda Engine before delivery to Pontiac Assembly for installation.

== History ==
The straight-8 was dubbed the Silver-Streak at Pontiac Division. Powered by the "eight", optional in lower-end models, a Pontiac was promoted as a likable automobile, with enough power under the hood to get the job done in affordable luxury.

However, by the early 1950s, powerful overhead valve V8s from sister GM Divisions Cadillac, Buick and Oldsmobile, as well as new overhead valve V8s from Ford Motor Company and Chrysler Corporation, made the flathead "Silver Streak" all but obsolete. It was a quiet, smooth running, cheap to produce engine that served the needs of the 1930s and '40s Pontiac buyers adequately for power. By 1953 the 287-cubic-inch (4.7 L) Strato Streak V8 was ready to go, with Pontiac chassis and steering already adapted for it, but it was held back by the protesting Buick and Olds divisions. It was a truly modern, durable but affordable design perfectly matched to Pontiac's target market. A few years later (fall of 1956), under the guidance of Bunkie Knudsen Pontiac was determined to change its image into a performance car to boost sales, this led Knudsen to look for further talent, including Pete Estes as chief engineer (taken from Olds division) and John DeLorean as director of advanced engineering, a former Packard and Chrysler engineer. Pontiac became known as a performance division based upon the durable, well performing V8s that came later, all of them based upon the original 287 of 1955.

=== Market ===
Designed and priced for conservative lower middle class buyers, the Pontiacs filled a slot between the popular Chevrolet and the higher priced Oldsmobiles and Buicks.

=== Design ===
The "eight" was a typical American built engine for its time, a side-valve L-head, or "flathead", with a chain driven cam. It was naturally aspirated through a Carter "W" series single or dual-venturi (one- or two-barrel) downdraft carburetor.

=== Advantages ===
Of all cylinder layouts without balance shaft, a straight eight design has very low inherent vibration, while the side-valve layout contains the moving parts of the valve train within the cast-iron block, enabling it to be very quiet compared to an overhead valve configuration (as in the contemporary Buick engines). Combined with a substantial exhaust manifold and effective intake and exhaust muffling this can lead to a very quiet vehicle, both internally and externally. At the time of its use, a quiet and vibration free engine was thought to be a mark of quality in an automobile. Bores need be of small diameter to keep the engine length down, and so strokes must be long to obtain larger displacements — such configurations (called "undersquare") exhibit good low-rpm torque and are capable of slow idle speeds, enhancing both drivability and quietness. While Chrysler vehicles had similar engines they were not targeted for the lower middle price range enabled by General Motors' manufacturing expertise and volumes of the time.

=== Disadvantages ===
As with other iron block straight configurations, the engine is considerably heavier than an equivalent V configuration, requiring more materials for the crank and crankcase and so increasing overall vehicle weight in even greater proportion. The long crankshaft tends to exhibit torsional vibration modes under high power, while side-valve flathead engines inhibit smooth intake and exhaust gas flow, limiting power. None of these disadvantages were disabling until the "horsepower race" initiated in the early 1950s ensured the dominance of the overhead valve V8.

=== Applications ===
During its run, the eight came in all Pontiacs, which included the Special and Deluxe (1936–40), Torpedo (1940–48) and Streamliner (1942–52), as well as the first six years of the Chieftain (1949–58) and the debut year for the Star Chief (1954–66).

== Specifications ==
Compression on the "eight" started at 5.7:1 initially, and was increased to 6.2:1 in 1934. In 1940 it was increased again to 6.5:1. From 1952 to 1954 two compression ratios were specified, 6.8:1 with synchromesh (manual) transmission, and 7.7:1 with Hydramatic automatic transmission. The engine had a remarkably low idle speed of 450 rpm with standard transmission and 375 rpm (while in drive) for the automatic; a modern engine is usually tuned to a minimum 600-700 rpm. The electrical system was a 6-volt primary with a negative ground, and a conventional mechanical ignition, with the firing order 1-6-2-5-8-3-7-4. The Pontiac engines employed a full pressure oiling system and full bearing inserts, unlike its Chevrolet cousin.

Below are specifications as per the model year and displacement, with output shown as horsepower (kilowatts).

Year	Model name (number)	Displacement	Power output	Torque	Carburetor series (bbl)
1933	Eight	223.4 cu in (3.7 L)	77 hp (57 kW) @ 3600 rpm	N/A	Carter W-1 (1)
1934	Eight	223.4 cu in (3.7 L)	84 hp (63 kW) @ 3600 rpm	153 lb⋅ft (207 N⋅m) @ 1600 rpm	Carter W-1 (1) Model 283-S
1935	Eight	223.4 cu in (3.7 L)	84 hp (63 kW) @ 3800 rpm	153 lb⋅ft (207 N⋅m) @ 1600 rpm	Carter W-1 (1)
1936	Eight	232.3 cu in (3.8 L)	87 hp (65 kW) @ 3800 rpm	161 lb⋅ft (218 N⋅m) @ 1600 rpm	Carter W-1 (1)
1937	Eight	248.9 cu in (4.1 L)	100 hp (75 kW) @ 3800 rpm	172 lb⋅ft (233 N⋅m) @ 1600 rpm	Carter W-1 (1)
1938	Eight	248.9 cu in (4.1 L)	100 hp (75 kW) @ 3700 rpm	172 lb⋅ft (233 N⋅m) @ 1600 rpm	Carter W-1 (1)
1939	De Luxe 8	248.9 cu in (4.1 L)	100 hp (75 kW) @ 3700 rpm	172 lb⋅ft (233 N⋅m) @ 1600 rpm	Carter W-1 (1)
1940	Deluxe	248.9 cu in (4.1 L)	100 hp (75 kW) @ 3700 rpm	175 lb⋅ft (237 N⋅m) @ 1600 rpm	Carter WA-1, WD-0 (2)
1941	Custom & Torpedo Streamliner 8	248.9 cu in (4.1 L)	103 hp (77 kW) @ 3500 rpm	190 lb⋅ft (258 N⋅m) @ 2200 rpm	Carter WD-O (2)
1942	Streamliner	248.9 cu in (4.1 L)	103 hp (77 kW) @ 3700 rpm	NA @ 2000	Carter WD-0 (2)
1946	Torpedo (27LA78)	248.9 cu in (4.1 L)	107 hp (80 kW) @ 3700 rpm	190 lb⋅ft (258 N⋅m) @ 2000 rpm	Carter WCD 548 (2)
1947	Streamliner (8 MB)	248.9 cu in (4.1 L)	107 hp (80 kW) @ 3700 rpm	190 lb⋅ft (258 N⋅m) @ 2000 rpm	Carter WCD 630 (2)
1948	Streamliner Wagon (28)	248.9 cu in (4.1 L)	108 hp (81 kW) @ 3700 rpm	NA @ 2000	Carter WCD 630 (2)
1948	Torpedo (8PA)	248.9 cu in (4.1 L)	107 hp (80 kW) @ 3700 rpm	190 lb⋅ft (258 N⋅m) @ 2000 rpm	Carter WCD 652 (2)
1949	Chieftain (8R)	248.9 cu in (4.1 L)	106 hp (79 kW) @ 3800 rpm	190 lb⋅ft (258 N⋅m) @ 2200 rpm	Carter WCD 719/720 (2)
1950	Silver Streak 8 (50-27)	268.2 cu in (4.4 L)	108 hp (81 kW) @ 3600 rpm	208 lb⋅ft (282 N⋅m) @ 1800 rpm	Carter WCD 719/720 (2)
1951	Silver Streak 8 (51-27)	268.2 cu in (4.4 L)	116 hp (87 kW) @ 3600 rpm	220 lb⋅ft (298 N⋅m) @ 2000 rpm	Carter WCD 719/720 (2)
1952	Silver Streak 8 W/Synchromesh (52-27)	268.2 cu in (4.4 L)	118 hp (88 kW) @ 3600 rpm	222 lb⋅ft (301 N⋅m) @ 2200 rpm	Carter WCD 719/720 (2) (6.8:1 compression)
1952	Silver Streak 8 W/Hydra-Matic (52-27)	268.2 cu in (4.4 L)	122 hp (91 kW) @ 3600 rpm	222 lb⋅ft (301 N⋅m) @ 2200 rpm	Carter WCD 719/720 (2) (7.7:1 compression)
1953	Chieftain 8 W/Synchromesh (53-27)	268.2 cu in (4.4 L)	118 hp (88 kW) @ 3600 rpm	222 lb⋅ft (301 N⋅m) @ 2200 rpm	Carter WCD 2010S (2) (6.8:1 compression)
1953	Chieftain 8 W/Hydra-Matic (53-27)	268.2 cu in (4.4 L)	122 hp (91 kW) @ 3600 rpm	222 lb⋅ft (301 N⋅m) @ 2200 rpm	Carter WCD 2010S (2) (7.7:1 compression)
1954	Chieftain 8 W/Synchromesh (54-27)	268.2 cu in (4.4 L)	122 hp (91 kW) @ 3800 rpm	222 lb⋅ft (301 N⋅m) @ 2200 rpm	Carter WCD? (2) (6.8:1 compression)
1954	Chieftain 8 W/Hydramatic (54-27)	268.2 cu in (4.4 L)	127 hp (95 kW) @ 3800 rpm	234 lb⋅ft (317 N⋅m) @ 2200 rpm	Carter WCD 2122S (2) (7.7:1 compression)

== "Special"-8 ==
At the General Motors Motorama for 1954, Pontiac debuted its all new Bonneville Special, a concept car envisioned by head designer Harley J. Earl. The concept was equipped with the "Special"-8, a high output 268-cubic-inch (4.4 L) engine that was painted bright red and detailed in chrome. This was a unique configuration for the "eight", installed in the only two Specials ever made. Similar in appearance only, this was a high compression variant, modified with a high-lift cam and fitted with four Carter YH side-draft one-barrel carburetors, the same used in the 1953 Corvette, under open-mesh breathers. Total output was the highest ever for the "eight", rated at 230 bhp (172 kW), though some estimated it at over 300 bhp (224 kW). Like the Special, only two were ever made.

Note: Pontiac’s new V8 was being considered for use in the Special but was instead held back by GM marketing. They directed that the straight-eight be used to keep the V8 a secret from consumers for one more year until its debut the following year.

Year	Model name (number)	Displacement	Power Output	Torque	Carburetor series (bbl)
1954	(SO 2026)	268 cu in (4.4 L)	230 hp (172 kW) @ 3700 rpm	NA @ 2000 rpm	Carter YH 2206 (1) x 4

== See also ==
- Pontiac Trophy 4 engine
- Pontiac straight-6 engine
- Pontiac V8 engine
- List of GM engines
