= List of Pontiac vehicles =

Pontiac Logo

This is a list of Pontiac vehicles. Pontiac was a brand of automobiles manufactured and sold by General Motors (GM); though production ended in 2009, Pontiac remains a registered and active trademark of GM.

== Past models ==
=== United States ===
Exterior	Name	Year Introduced	Year Discontinued	Platforms	Generation	Vehicle Information	Note
	Six	1926	1940	GM A	2	Full-size car	
	Torpedo	1939	1948	GM A, GM B, GM C (RWD)	2	Full-size car	
	Eight / Streamliner	1941	1951	GM B	3	Full-size car	(Note: From 1940 to 1942, Pontiac renamed its entire line-up to "Torpedo", with the Streamliner becoming the "Pontiac Streamliner Torpedo Eight".)
	Chieftain	1949	1958	GM A, GM B	3	Full-size car	
	Catalina	1959	1981	GM B	5	Entry-level full-size car.	(Note: From 1950–1958 the 'Catalina' name was used as a trim level for the Pontiac Chieftain.)
	Star Chief	1954	1966	GM A, GM B	6	Upper trim of the Chieftain (1954–1958) and intermediate trim of the Catalina (1959–1966)	
	Safari	1955	1957	GM A, GM B	2	Full-size station wagon	(Note: From 1955–1957 the Safari was a station wagon variant of the Chieftain/Star Chief, and from 1957–1989 was a station wagon variant of the Catalina.)
	Bonneville	1958	2005	GM B, GM G, GM H	10	Full-size car except a brief period of 1982–1986	(Note: In 1957 the name 'Bonneville' was used for a luxury convertible trim of the Pontiac Star Chief. From 1959–1981 the Bonneville was the upper trim level of the Catalina.)
	Tempest	1960	1970	GM Y, GM A	3	Compact (1960–1962), mid-size (1963–1970)	(Note: From 1987–1991 the 'Tempest' name was used for a rebadged version of the compact L-body Chevrolet Corsica in Canada and Israel.)
	Ventura	1960	1977	GM B, GM X	2	Full-size, later compact	(Note: From 1960–1970 the Ventura was a trim level of the Catalina.)
	LeMans	1961	1993	GM Y, GM A, GM T	6	Compact (1962–1963), mid-size (1964–1981), subcompact (1987–1993)	(Note: From 1961–1972 the LeMans was the top trim of the Pontiac Tempest.)
	Grand Prix	1962	2008	GM B, GM G, GM A (RWD), GM H (RWD), GM W	8	Personal luxury car (1962–1987), full-size car (1996–2008), mid-size car (1988–1996, 1996–2002 coupe)	(Note: From 1962–68 the Grand Prix was a performance-oriented trim of the Pontiac Catalina.)
	2+2	1964	1967	GM B	1	Upper trim of Catalina (1964) and GTO	
	GTO	1964	2006	GM A, GM X, GM V	5	Muscle car, later compact car	(Note: From 1964–1973 the GTO was a trim tier of the Tempest/Le Mans, and in 1974 as a trim of the Ventura. In 2004 it would be introduced as the US rebadge of the Holde)
	Executive	1966	1970	GM B	1	Middle range full-size car	
	Firebird	1967	2002	GM F	4	Pony car, muscle car	
	Custom S	1969	1969	GM A	1	One year only replacement for Tempest Custom trim	
	Grand Safari	1971	1978	GM C, GM B	2	Full-size station wagon	
	Grand Ville	1971	1975	GM B	1	Top range full-size car	
	Ventura II	1971	1972	GM X	1	Compact, rebadged Chevrolet Nova	
	Astre	1973	1977	GM H (RWD)	1	Subcompact car, rebadged Chevrolet Vega	
	Grand Am	1973	2005	GM A, GM G, GM N	5	Mid-size and later compact car	
	Sunbird	1976	1994	GM H, GM J	2	Subcompact, later compact	
	Phoenix	1977	1984	GM X	2	Compact	
	T1000	1981	1987	GM T	1	Subcompact car, rebadged Chevrolet Chevette	
	6000	1982	1991	GM A	1	Mid-size car	
	J2000 / 2000 / Sunbird	1982	1984	GM J	1	Compact car	
	Fiero	1984	1988	GM P	1	Sports car	
	Trans Sport	1990	1999	GM U	2	Minivan	
	Sunfire	1995	2005	GM J	1	Sport compact	
	Montana	1997	2009	GM U	2	Minivan	
	Aztek	2000	2005	GM U	1	Mid-size crossover SUV	
	Vibe	2003	2010	Toyota MC	2	Compact	
	G6	2005	2010	GM Epsilon	1	Mid-size car	
	Solstice	2006	2010	GM Kappa	1	Sports car	
	Torrent	2006	2009	GM Theta	1	Compact crossover SUV	
	G5	2007	2009	GM Delta	1	Compact car, rebadged Chevrolet Cobalt	
	G8	2008	2009	GM Zeta	1	Executive car, rebadged Holden Commodore	
	G3	2009	2009	Daewoo T200	1	Subcompact car, rebadged Chevrolet Aveo (T200)	

=== International ===
- Pontiac Acadian (1976–1987, rebadged Chevrolet Chevette/Pontiac T1000/1000, Canada)
- Pontiac Astre (1975–1977; 1973–1977 Canada)
- Pontiac Firefly (1985–2001, rebadged Chevrolet Sprint/Geo Metro/Suzuki Cultus, Canada)
- Pontiac G2 (2006-2010 (Mexico only, and Mexico made), rebadged Chevy Spark after that in the US.
- Pontiac G3 (2006–2009 (Mexico), rebadged Chevrolet Aveo/Daewoo Gentra)
- Pontiac G4 (2005–2009, rebadged Chevrolet Cobalt, Mexico)
- Pontiac G8 (2008–2009, rebadged Holden VE Commodore, Australia)
- Pontiac Grande Parisienne (1966–1969, Canada)
- Pontiac Laurentian (1955–1981, Canada)
- Pontiac Matiz (1998–2005, rebadged Daewoo Matiz, Mexico)
- Pontiac Matiz G2 (2006–2010, rebadged Daewoo Matiz, Mexico)
- Pontiac Montana SV6 (2005–2006, continues in production for Canada and Mexico)
- Pontiac Parisienne (1983–1986; 1958–1986, Canada)
- Pontiac Pathfinder (1955–1958, Canada)
- Pontiac Pursuit (later G5 Pursuit) (2005–2006, rebadged Chevrolet Cobalt, Canada)
- Pontiac Strato-Chief (1955–1970, Canada)
- Pontiac Sunburst (1985–1989, rebadged Chevrolet Spectrum/Isuzu Gemini, Canada)
- Pontiac Sunrunner (1994–1997, rebadged Geo Tracker/Suzuki Escudo, Canada)
- Pontiac Tempest (1987–1991, rebadged Chevrolet Corsica, Canada)
- Pontiac Wave (later G3 Wave) (2004–2010, rebadged Chevrolet Aveo/Daewoo Gentra, Canada)

== Concepts ==
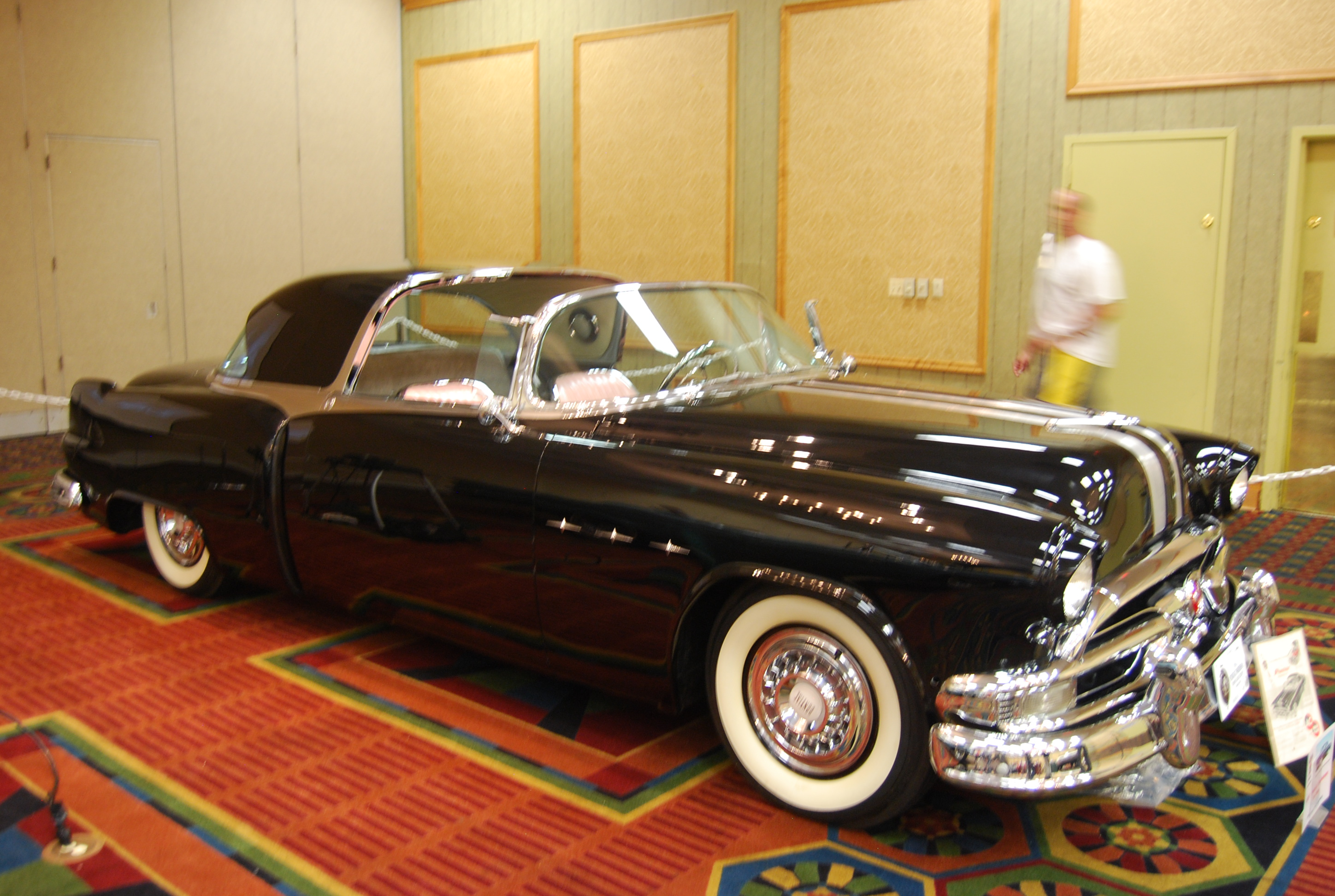
1953 Pontiac Parisienne

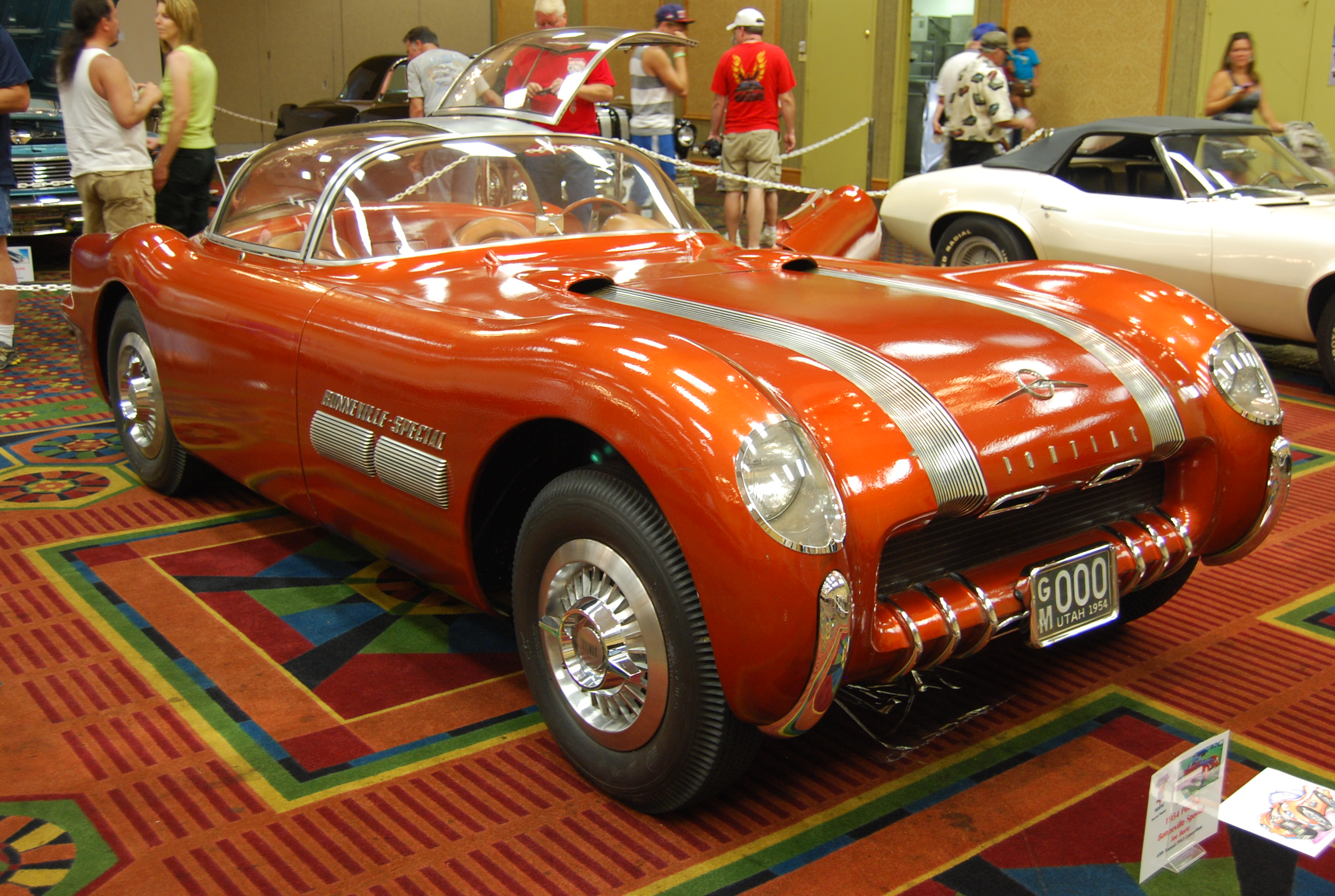
1954 Pontiac Bonneville Special

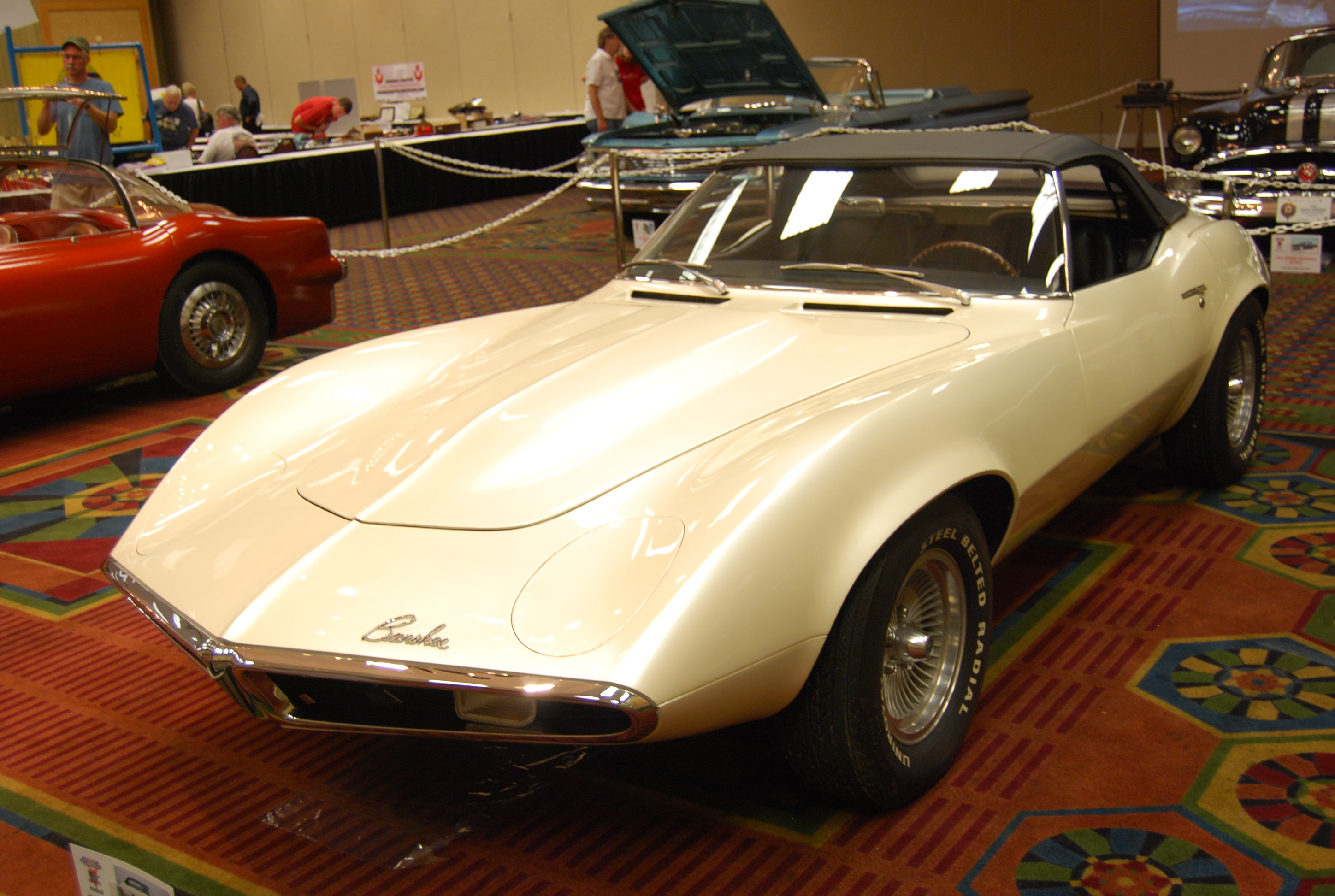
1964 Pontiac Banshee (XP-833)

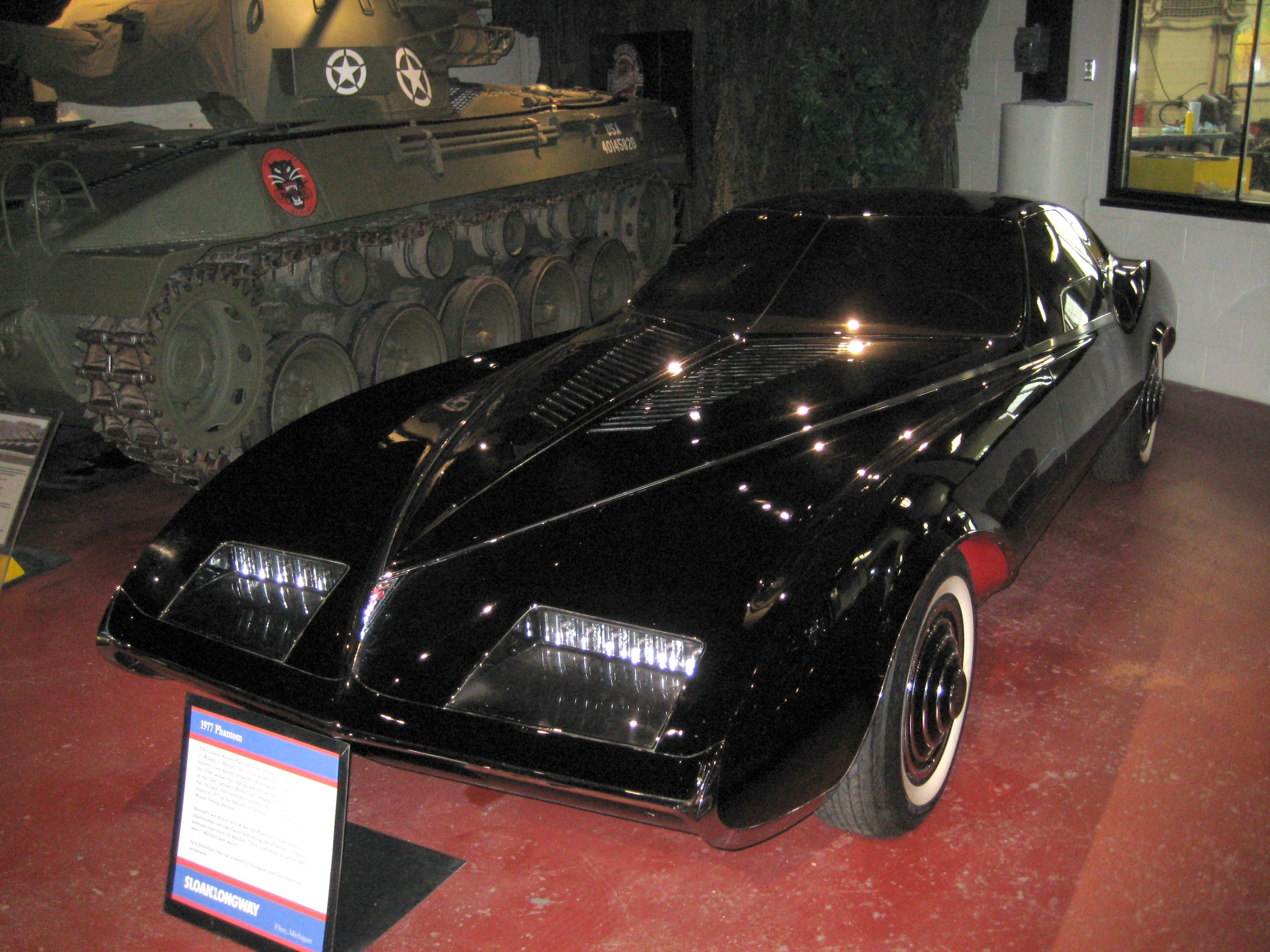
1977 Pontiac Phantom

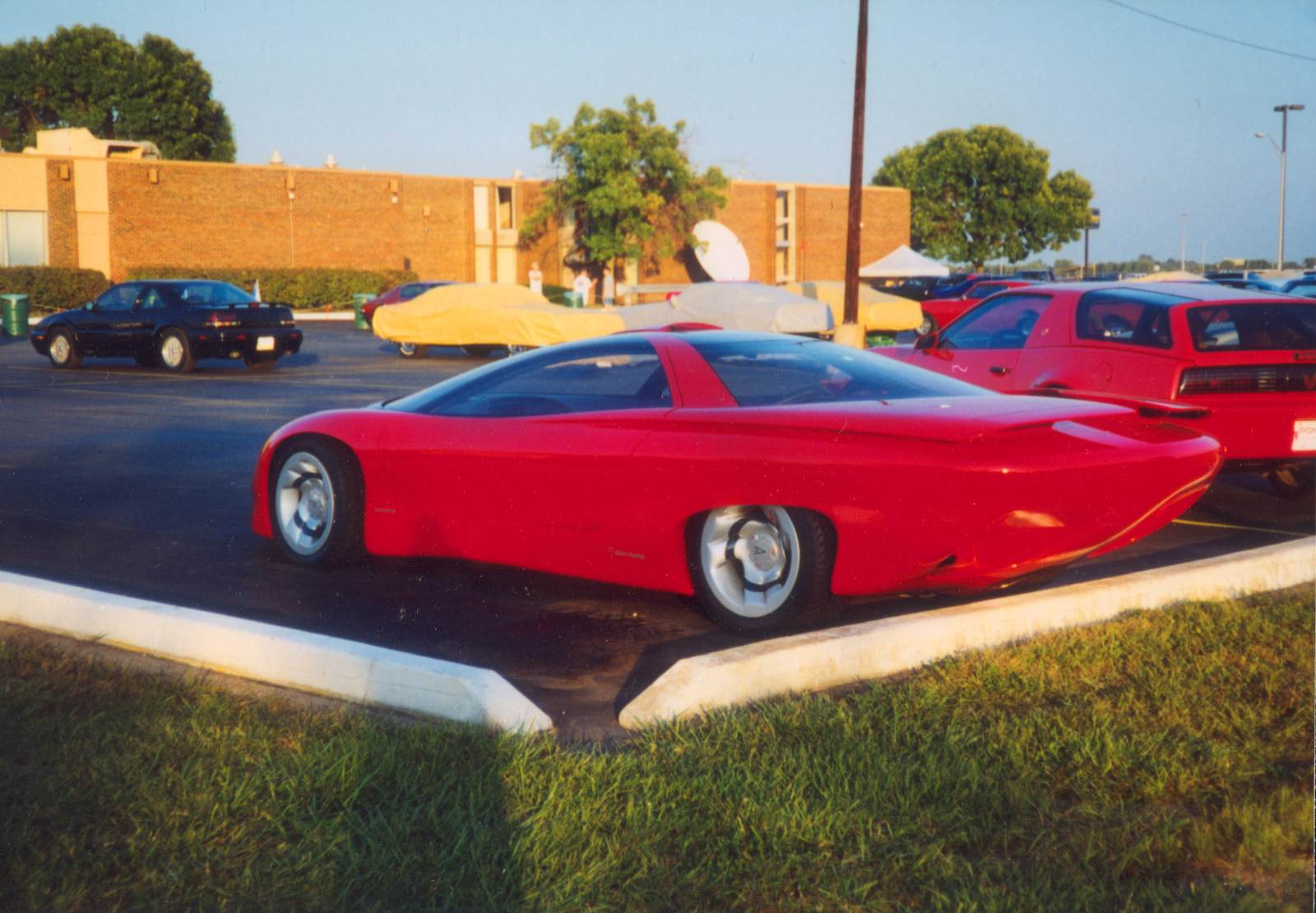
1989 Pontiac Banshee IV

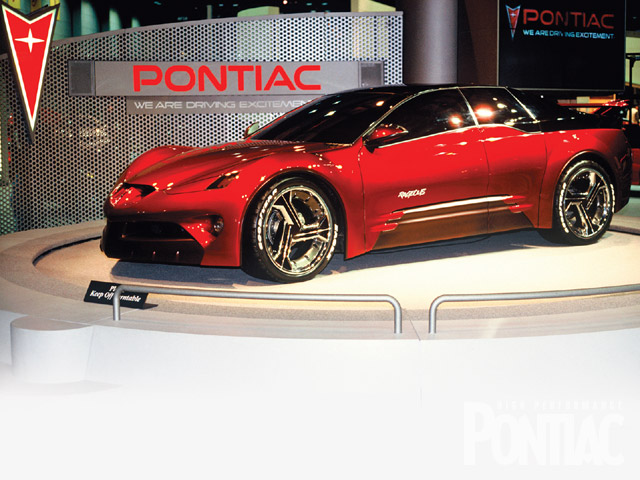
1997 Pontiac Rageous

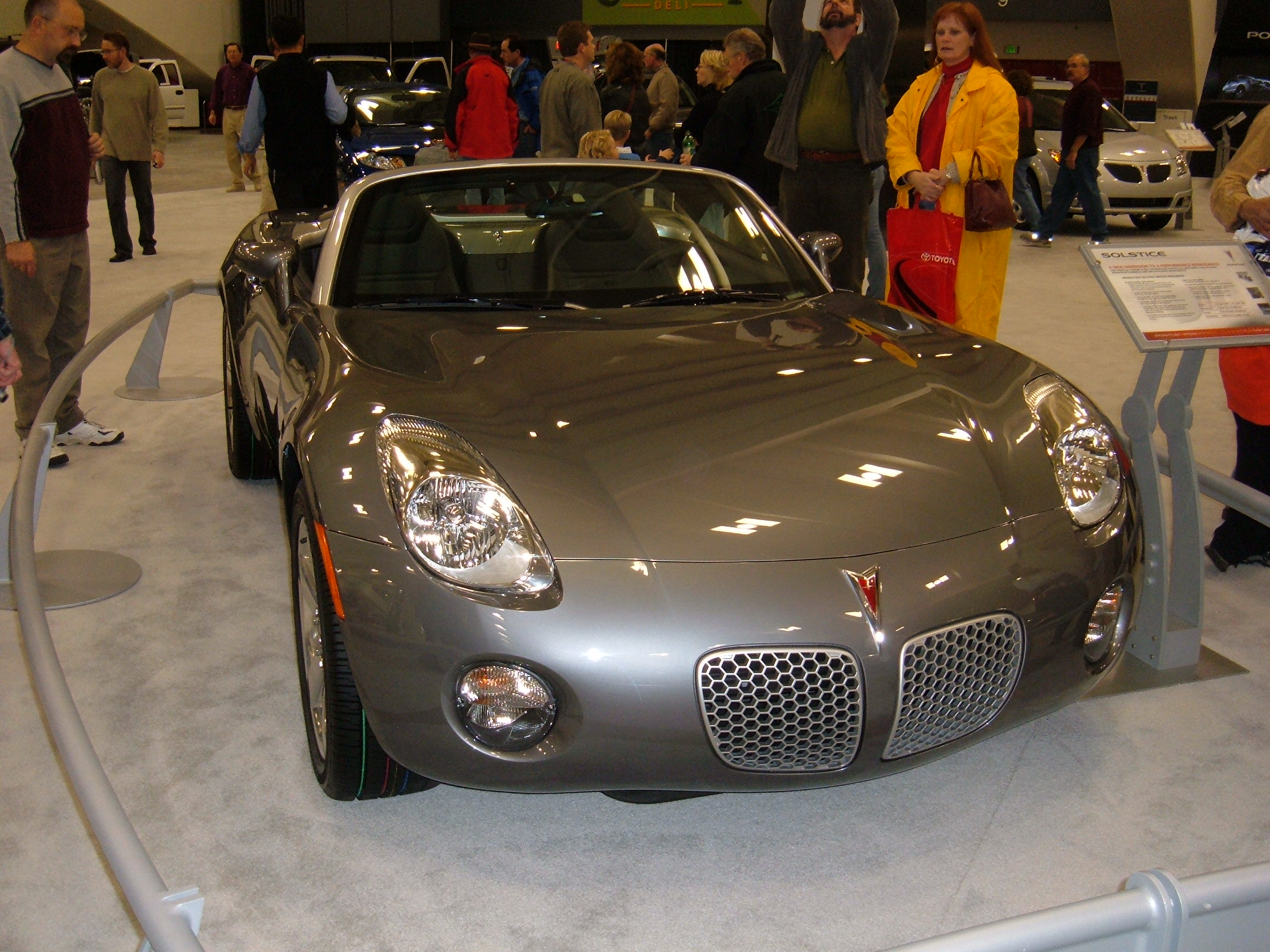
2004 Pontiac Solstice concept

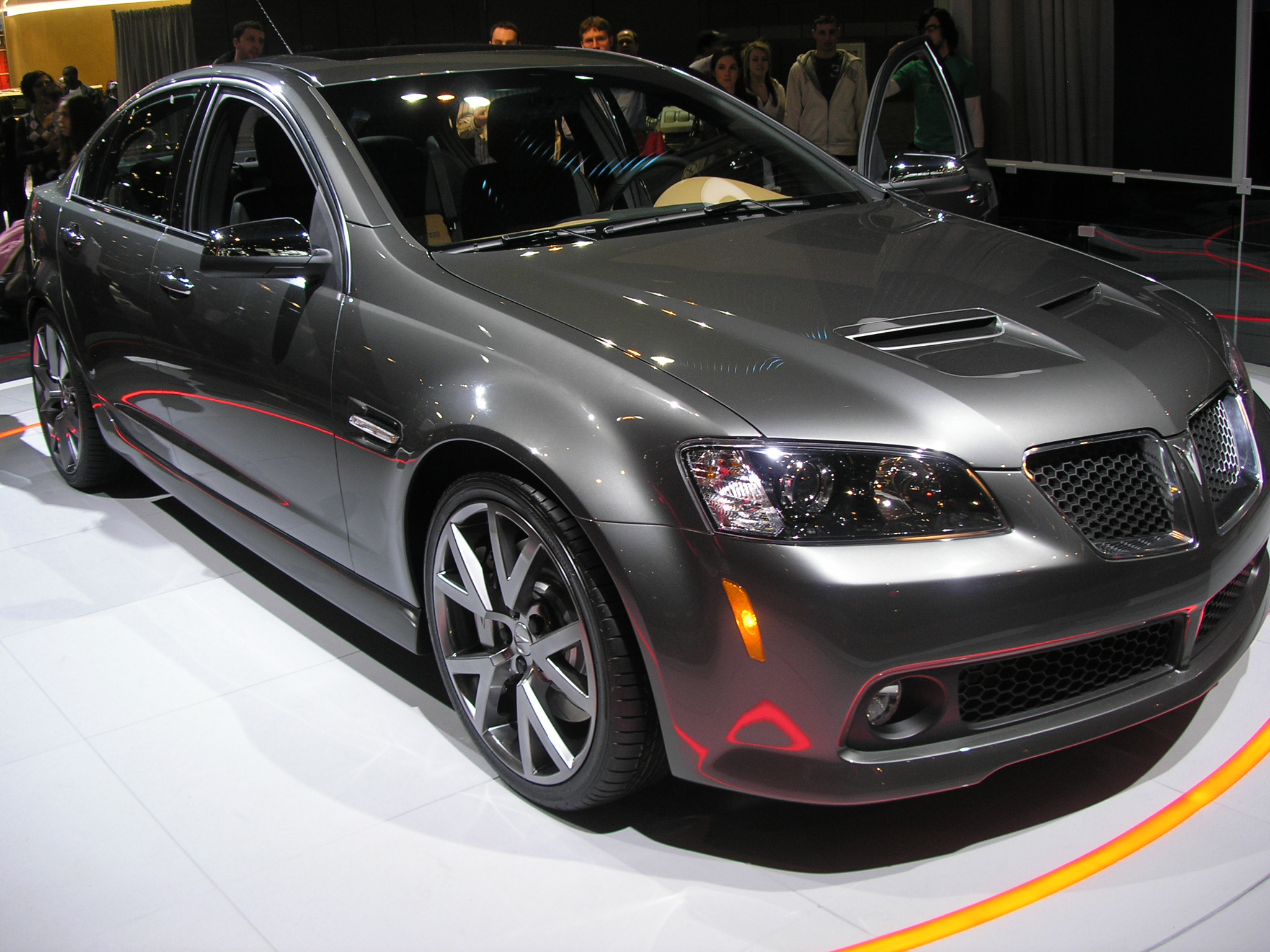
2007 Pontiac G8 concept
- Pontiac Aztek (1999)
- Pontiac Banshee (1966, 1969, 1974, 1979, 1989)
- Pontiac Bonneville Special (1954)
- Pontiac Bonneville Sport Convertible F/I 4 bucket seat cnvt (1958)
- Pontiac Bonneville X-400 (1959–1960)
- Pontiac Bonneville Le Grande Conchiche (1966)
- Pontiac Bonneville G/XP (2002)
- Pontiac Cirrus (1966)
- Pontiac Club de Mer (1956)
- Pontiac Fiero Convertible (1984)
- Pontiac G6 (2003)
- Pontiac Grand Prix X-400 (1962–1963)
- Pontiac Grand Prix SJ Edinburgh (1972)
- Pontiac Grand Prix Landau (1979)
- Pontiac GTO (1999)
- Pontiac Maharani (1963)
- Pontiac Montana Thunder (1998)
- Pontiac Monte Carlo (1962)
- Pontiac Proto Sport 4 (1991)
- Pontiac Parisienne (1953–1954)
- Pontiac Piranha (2000)
- Pontiac Pursuit (1987)
- Pontiac Rageous (1997)
- Pontiac REV (2001)
- Pontiac Salsa (1992)
- Pontiac Solstice (2002)
- Pontiac Stinger (1989)
- Pontiac Strato-Streak (1954)
- Pontiac Strato-Star (1955)
- Pontiac Sunfire (1990)
- Pontiac Sunfire Speedster (1994)
- Pontiac Tempest Fleur de Lis (1963)
- Pontiac Trans Am Type K (1978–1979)
- Pontiac Trans Sport (1986)
