= Pontiac Chieftain =

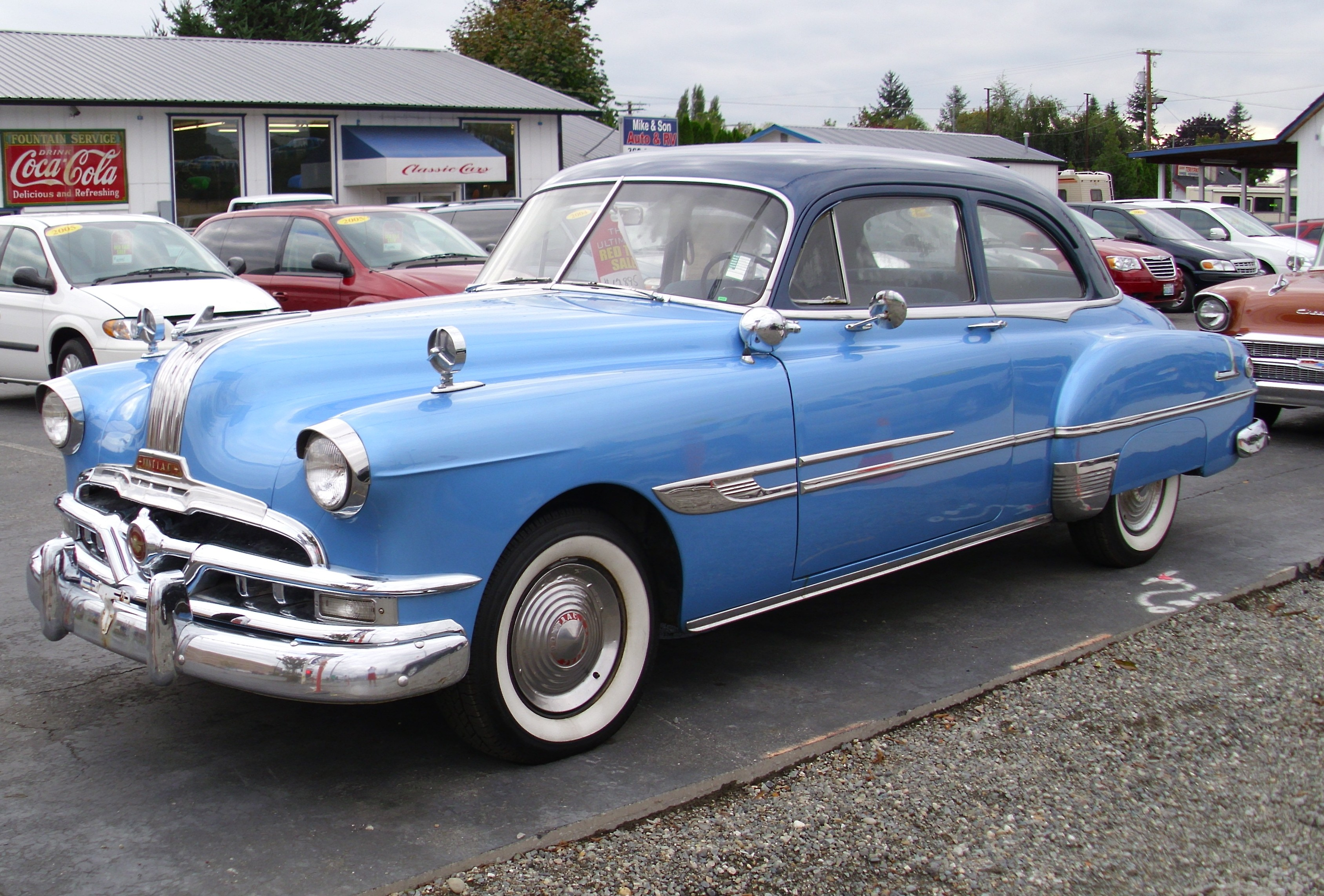
- 1952 Pontiac Chieftain Deluxe two-door Sedan

Overview
- Manufacturer: Pontiac (General Motors)
- Production: 1949–1958
- Assembly: (main plant); Pontiac, Michigan, United States (branch assembly); South Gate, California, United States; Arlington, Texas, United States; Wilmington, Delaware, United States; Atlanta, Georgia, United States; Kansas City, Kansas, United States; Framingham, Massachusetts, United States; Linden, New Jersey, United States
- Designer: Harley Earl

Body and chassis
- Class: Full-size car
- Layout: FR layout
- Platform: A-body

Powertrain
- Transmission: 3-speed synchromesh manual 4-speed Hydramatic automatic

Chronology
- Predecessor: Pontiac Torpedo
- Successor: Pontiac Catalina

The Pontiac Chieftain is an automobile which was produced by Pontiac from 1949 to 1958. The 1949 Chieftain and Streamliner models were the first all new car designs to come from Pontiac in the post World War II years. Previous cars had been 1942 models with minor revisions.

== First generation (1949–1954) ==
First generation
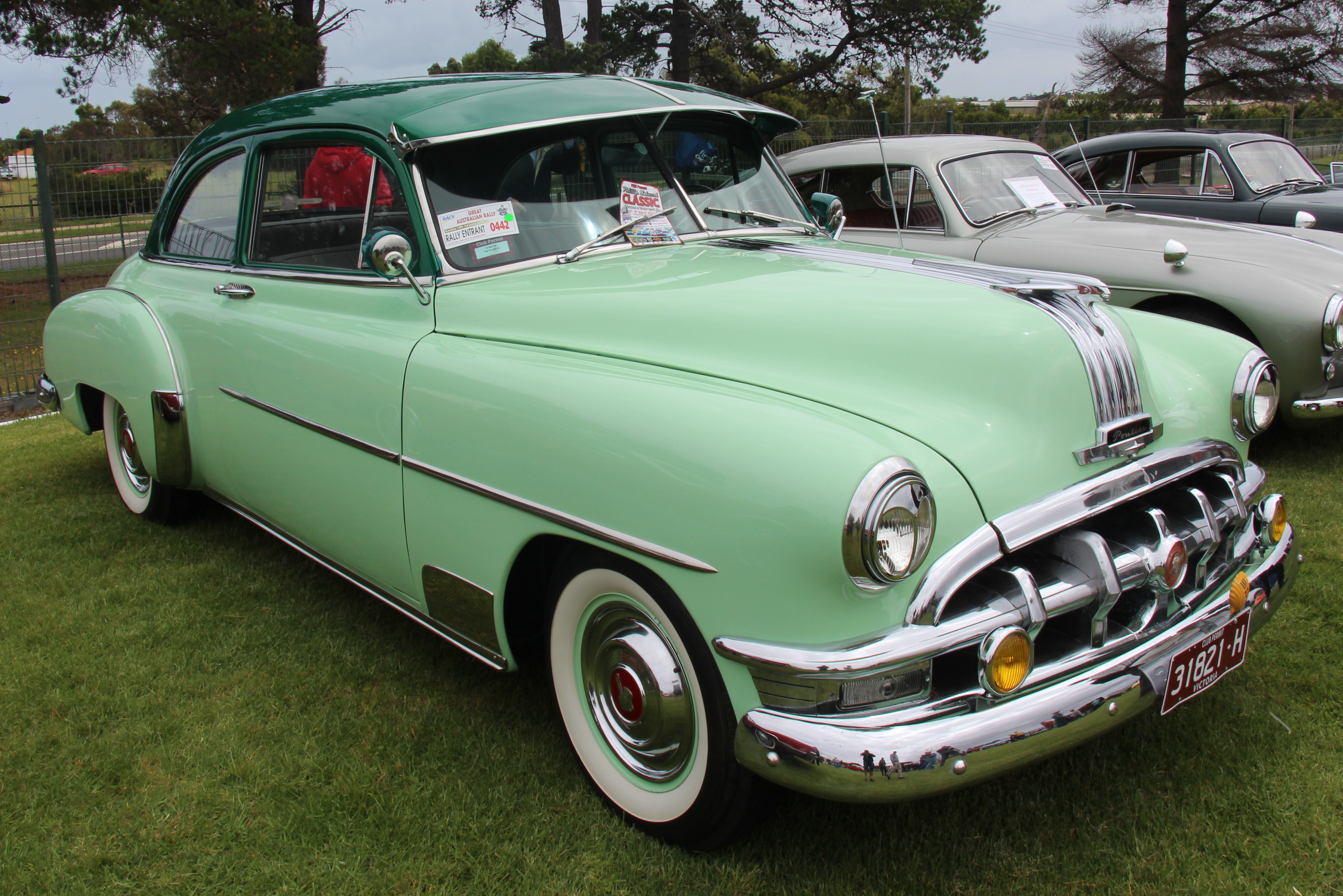
- 1950 Pontiac Chieftain De Luxe Sedan Coupe

Overview
- Model years: 1949–1954

Body and chassis
- Body style: 2-door sedan 4-door sedan 2-door coupe 2-door hardtop 2-door convertible 4-door station wagon
- Layout: FR layout
- Platform: GM A platform
- Related: Chevrolet Deluxe

Powertrain
- Engine: 239.2 cu in (3.9 L) L-head I6; 268.2 cu in (4.4 L) L-head Silver-Streak I8 (1949–1951); 268.4 cu in (4.4 L) L-head Silver-Streak I8 (1952–1954)

Dimensions
- Wheelbase: 1949-51: 120 in (3,048 mm); 1952-54: 122 in (3,099 mm)
- Length: 1949-51: 202.5 in (5,143.5 mm); 1952: 202.5 in (5,144 mm); 1953–1954: 5,150 mm (203 in)
- Width: 75.8 in (1,925 mm)(1949–1952); 76.6 in (1,946 mm) (1953–1954)
- Height: 63.3 in (1,608 mm)
- Curb weight: 1949-51: 3,384–3,433 lb (1,535–1,557 kg); 1952-54: 3,728–3,448 lb (1,691–1,564 kg)

In 1949 the A-body Chieftain replaced the Pontiac Torpedo as Pontiac's smaller and lower priced model. However, the newly redesigned B-bodied Pontiac Streamliner was now very similar (if not exact) in dimensions, engines, trim levels and options. This was the first time since 1934 that all Pontiacs had the same wheelbase. They had standard automatic interior lighting.

The Chieftain was initially introduced with four models: Sedan, Sedan Coupe, Business Coupe, and Deluxe Convertible Coupe. In 1950, a Catalina Coupe was added to the range while a station wagon was added in 1952, with the demise of the top-of-the-line Streamliner wagon.

1949 Chieftains came with a choice of four engines:

- a 239.2 cu in L-head 6-cylinder engine making 90 horsepower (67 kW) at 3400 rpm
- a 239.2 cu in L-head 6-cylinder engine making 93 horsepower (69 kW) at 3400 rpm
- a 248.9 cu in L-head 8-cylinder making 103 horsepower (77 kW) at 3800 rpm
- a 248.9 cu in L-head 8-cylinder making 106 horsepower (79 kW) at 3800 rpm

The horsepower differences between each of the 6- and 8-cylinder engines were due to changes in compression ratios.

Some of the more interesting optional items available for the first generation Chieftain included a radio with seven vacuum tubes, tissue dispenser, under seat heaters, and a Remington Auto-Home shaver. In 1951, the horsepower on the 8-cylinder rose to 116. The Chieftain came with a gas gauge, ammeter, oil pressure gauge, and a temperature gauge which had marks for 160, 180, and 220 degrees Fahrenheit.

For the 1952 model year, Pontiac discontinued the Streamliner leaving the Chieftain as their only offering. The Chieftain continued with the 120 inch wheelbase. Engine offerings were basically the same except for the 8-cylinder which got a .2 cubic inch enlargement. Horsepower did increase by 10 on the six-cylinder and by 15 on the eight-cylinder. Also, a red light to remind the driver that the parking brake was on was new. In the May 1952 issue of Popular Mechanics, the Chieftain was rated 14.9 seconds for a 0-60 mph time. Front head room was 36 inches, while rear head room was 35.75 inches.

In 1953, Pontiac came with a new body style, offering a 122 in (3,099 mm) wheelbase, and sleeker lines. The windshield was now one piece, and a panoramic rear window was standard. Pontiacs sported accentuated bubbled-up fins in the rear for the first time in 1953. The six-cylinder engine was standard. There was a lower-equipped Chieftain Special and a better-equipped Chieftain Deluxe line, as well as the Custom Catalina two-door hardtop coupe. A light-up plastic Chief Pontiac hood ornament that illuminated with the headlights adorned the front end.

The Star Chief was added to the Pontiac line in 1954 and the Chieftain was moved down to entry level status. Both cars were built on the A-body shell, but the new Star Chief had an 11 in (279 mm) extension added to its frame. Also in 1954, output of the eight-cylinder engines increased by about nine horsepower due to carburetor changes, up to 122 hp (91 kW) for the manual and 127 hp (95 kW) for the Hydra-Matic. The six-cylinder engines remained unchanged.

Pontiac was the last GM division to abandon its prewar inline eight engines as Oldsmobile and Cadillac had adopted modern OHV V8s in 1949 and Buick in 1953; Chevrolet has never had an inline eight. The 1953-54 Pontiacs had been meant for the division's new OHV 287 V8; however, Buick division managers succeeded in delaying its launch until 1955 to avoid upstaging their "Nailhead" Buick V8.

Partially because of competition from Chevrolet, Oldsmobile, and Buick, and partially because Pontiac still lacked a V8, total sales fell by 30% in 1954.

Also in 1954, power brakes, "power lift" windows (only for the front doors), as well as air-conditioning were offered as extra cost options for the first time. The 1954 Pontiacs have the distinction of the first production car in the US to have an air conditioning system in the modern sense with in-dash controls. In addition, a far more responsive and fully adjustable front seat was added.

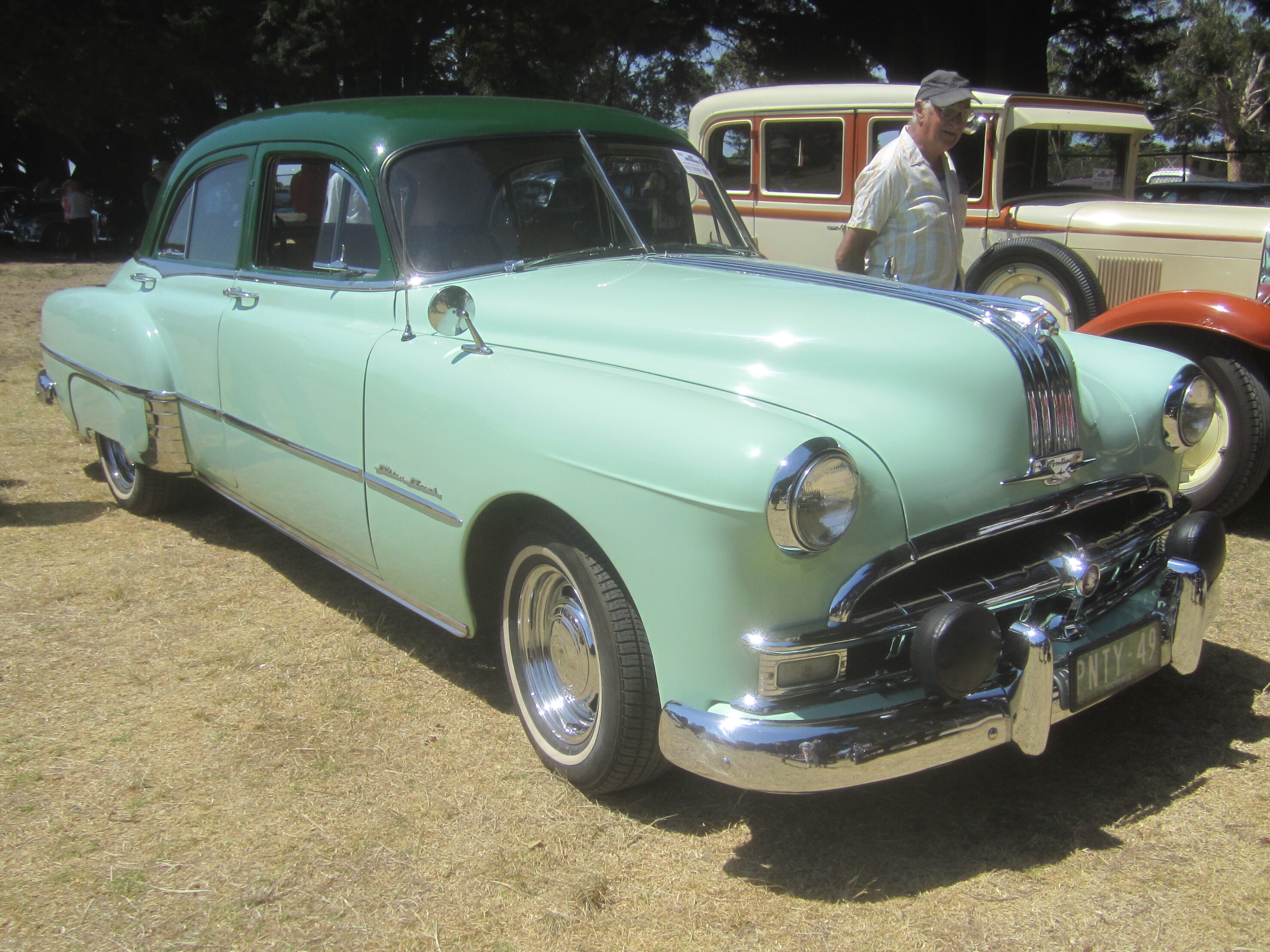
1949 Pontiac Chieftain De Luxe 4-Door Sedan

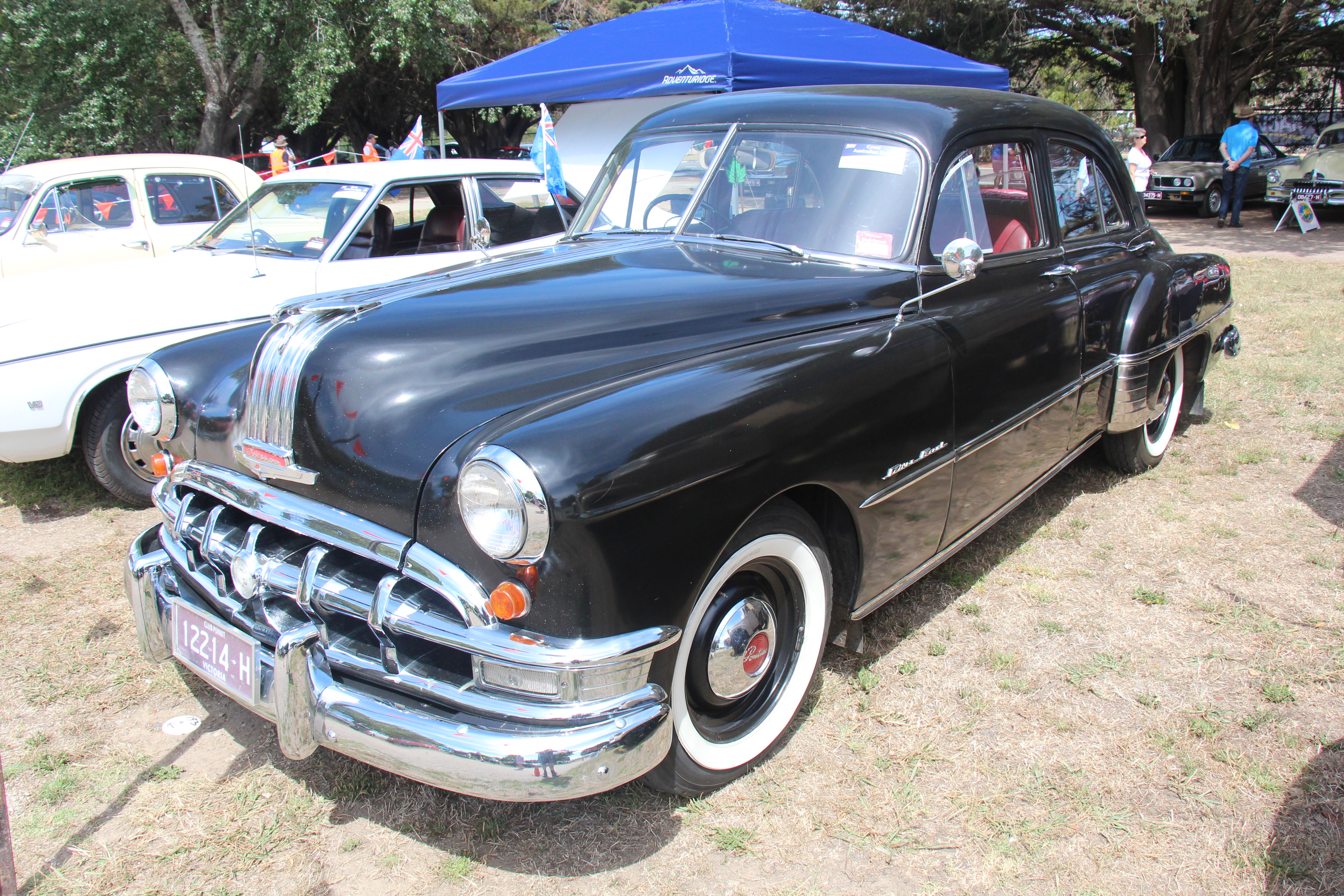
1950 Pontiac Chieftain

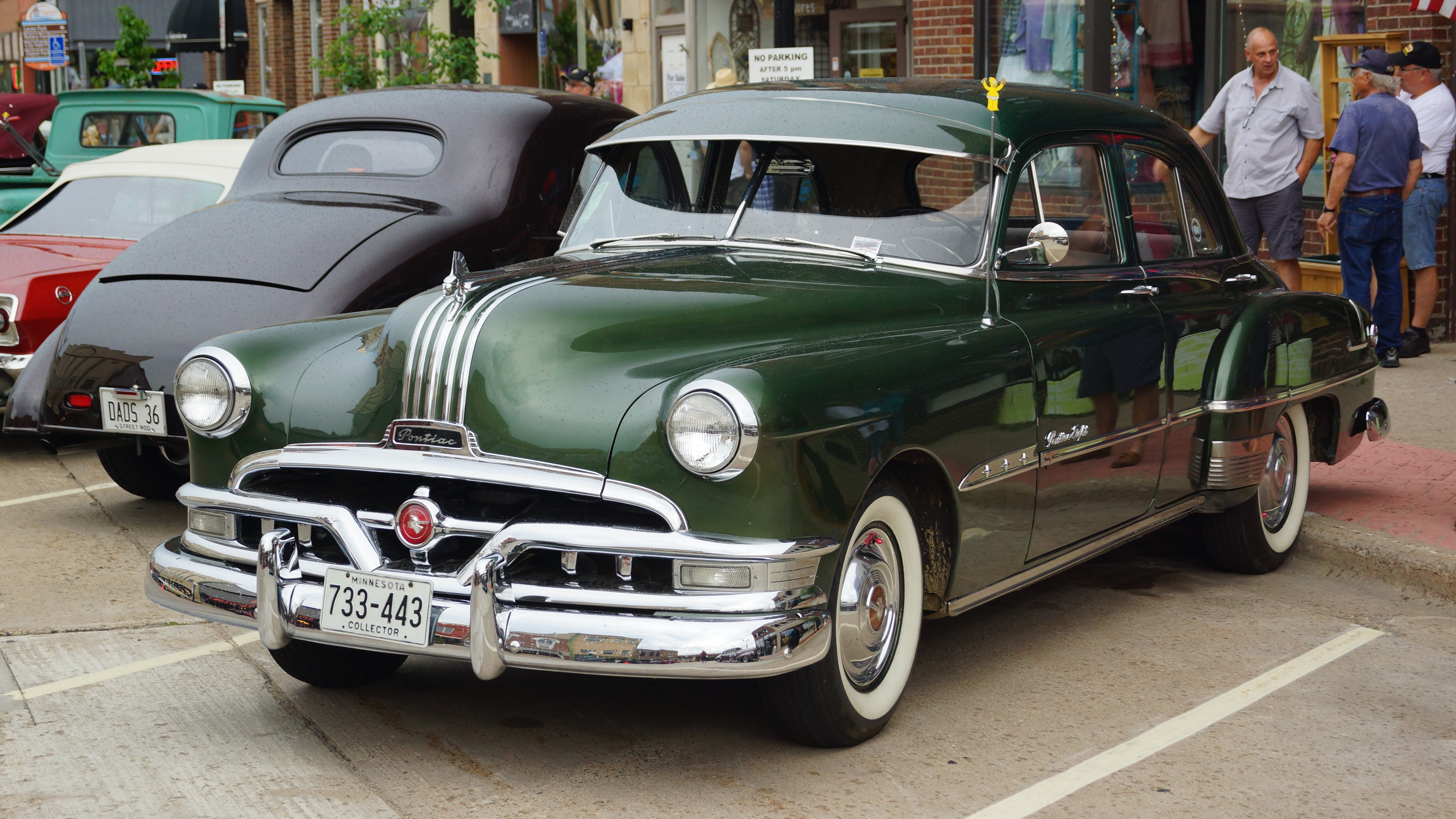
1951 Pontiac Chieftain De Luxe Four-Door Sedan

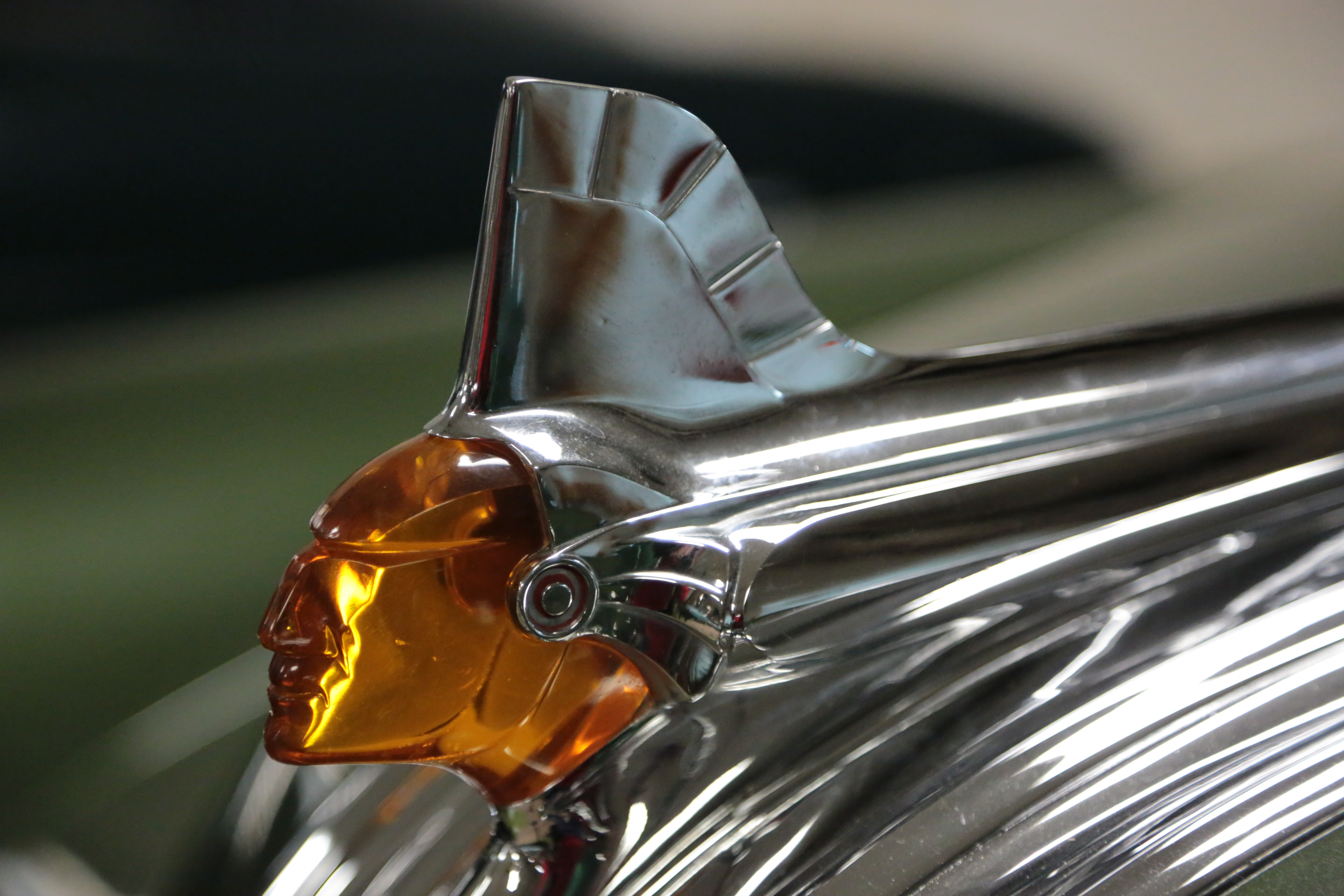
1951 Pontiac Chieftain hood ornament

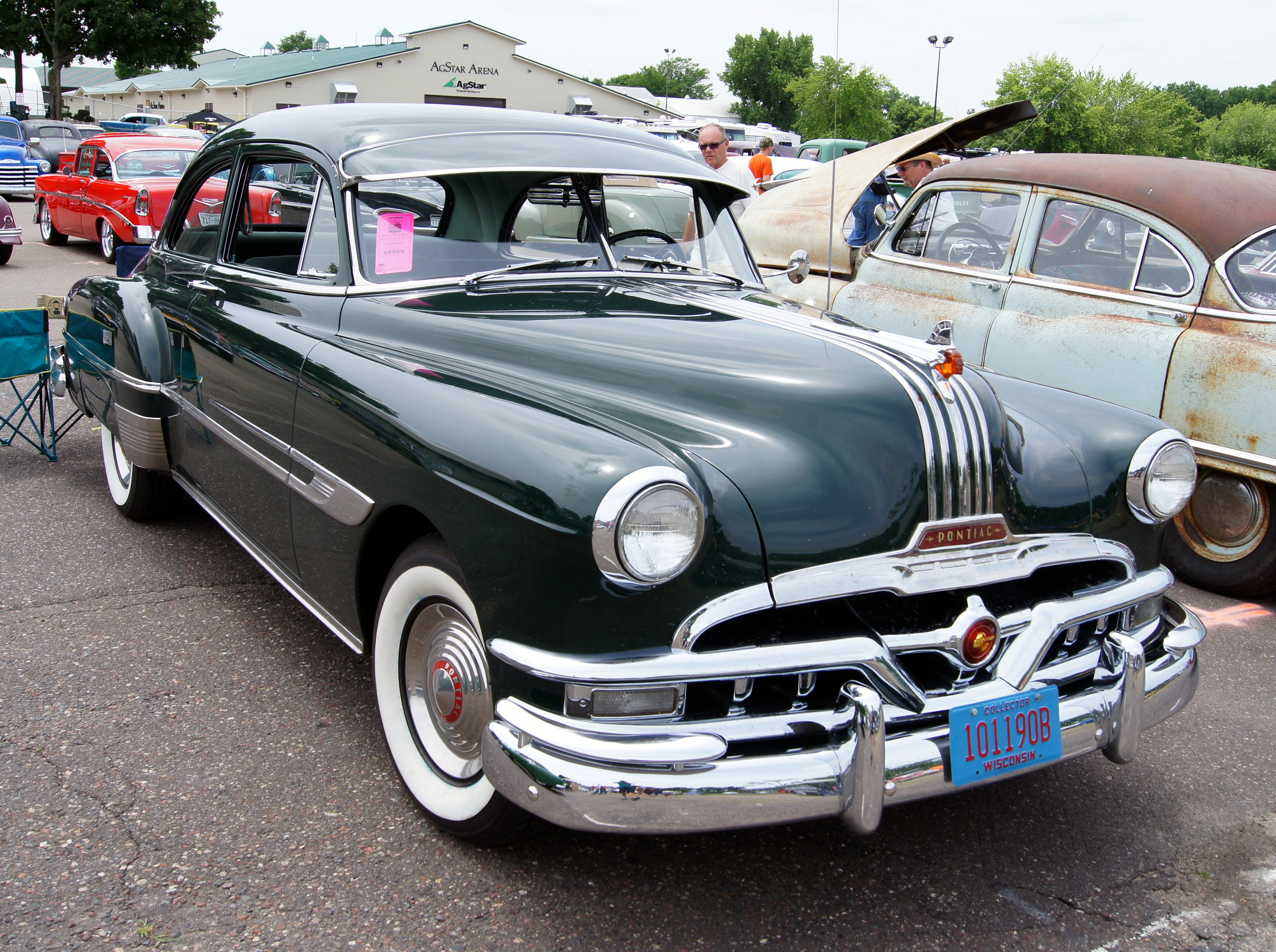
1952 Pontiac Chieftain De Luxe Two-Door Sedan

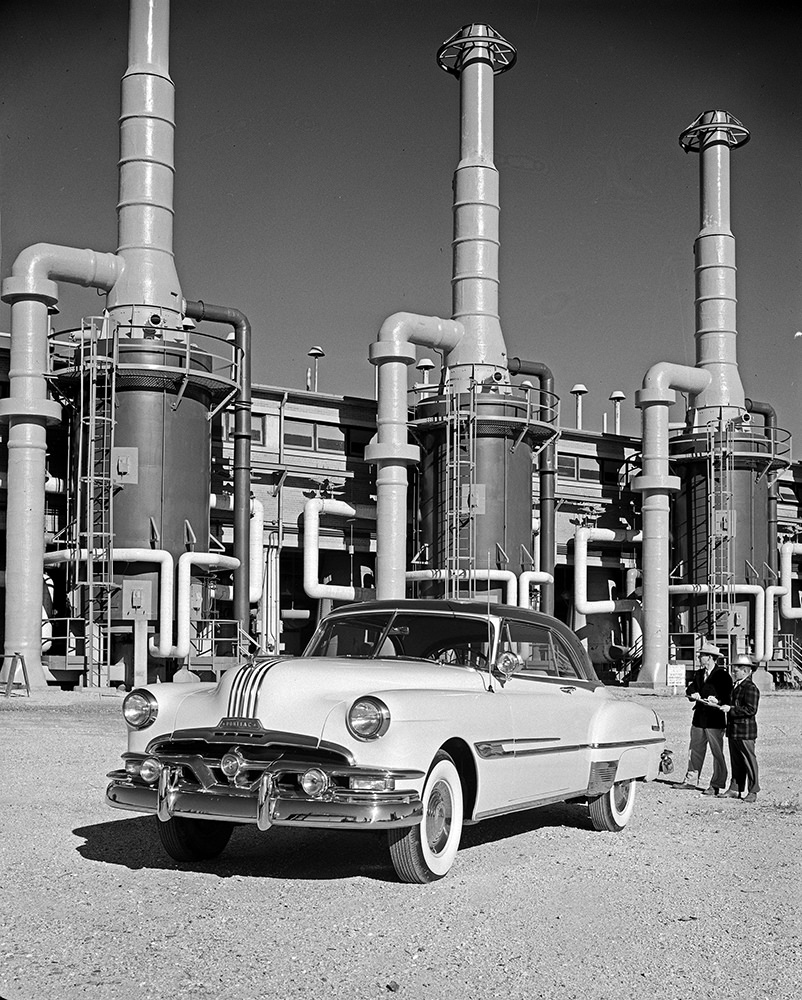
1952 Pontiac Chieftain DeLuxe Catalina (Robert Yarnall Richie photograph)

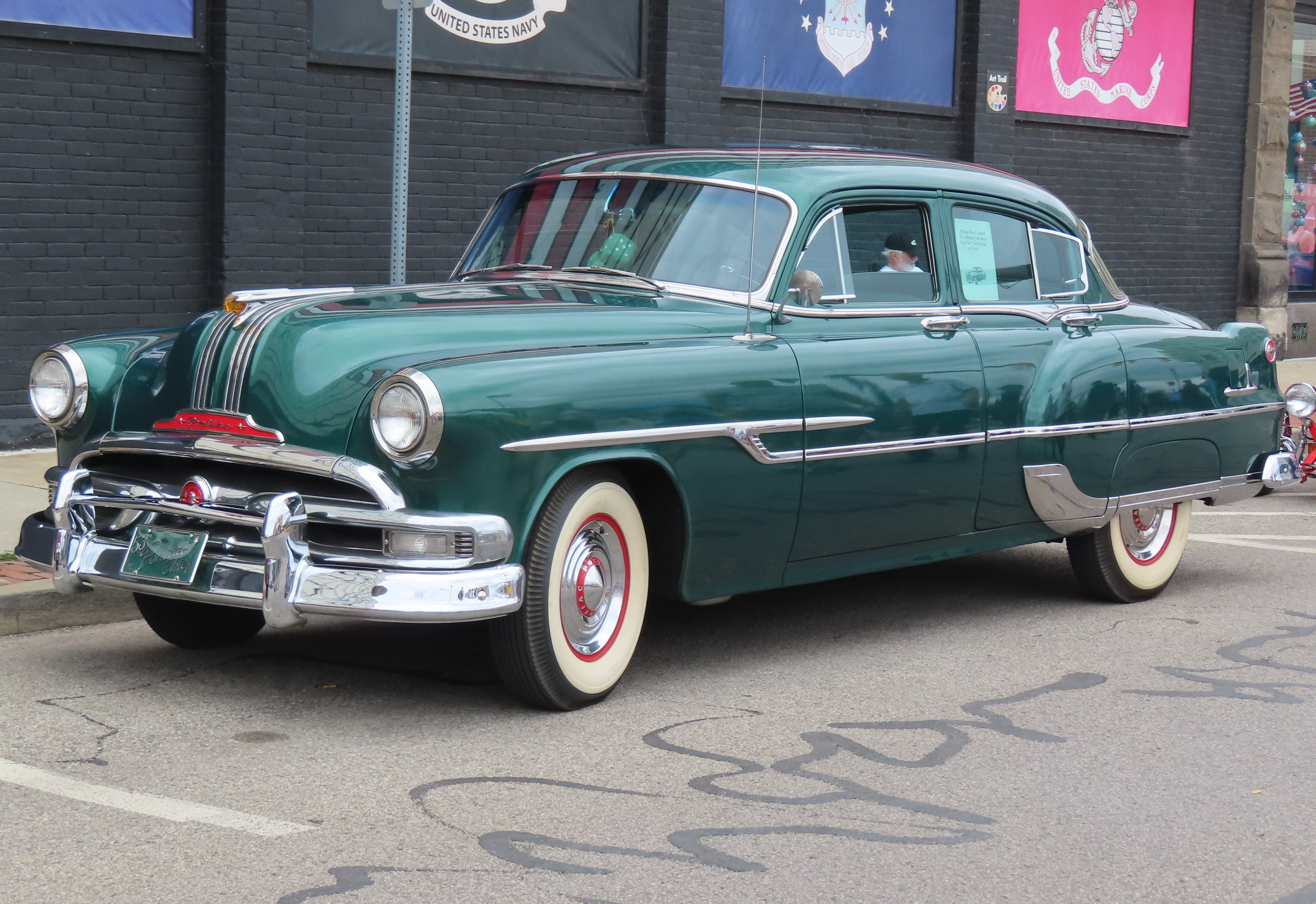
1953 Pontiac Chieftain De Luxe Four-Door Sedan

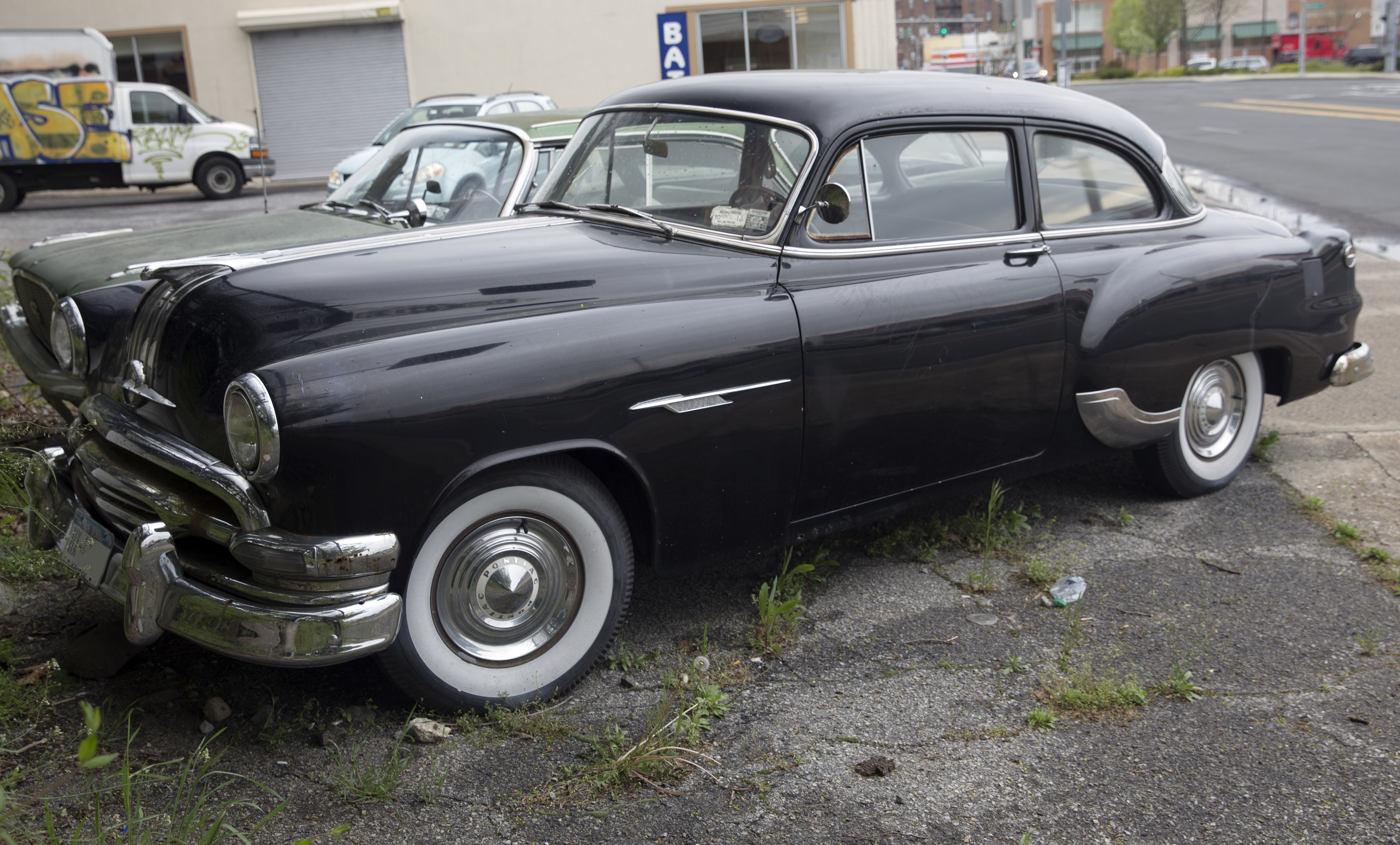
1954 Pontiac Chieftain Special Six two-door sedan, with considerably less chrome than the Deluxe models

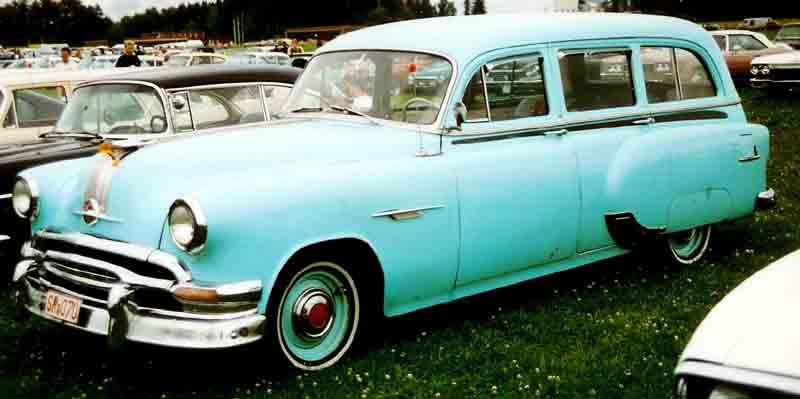
1954 Pontiac Chieftain Special Station Wagon

== Second generation (1955–1957) ==
Second generation
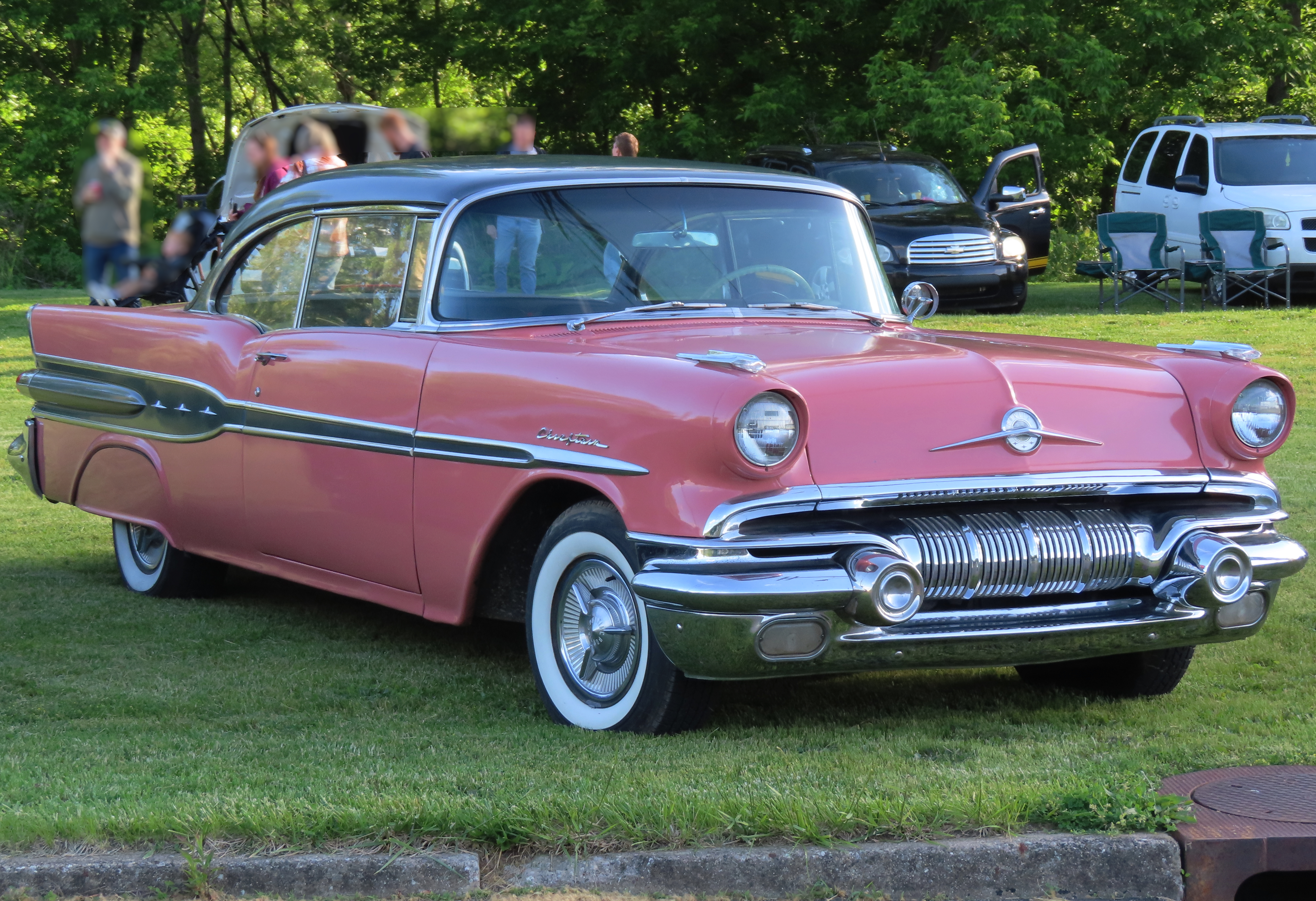
- 1957 Pontiac Chieftain 2-Door Catalina

Overview
- Also called: Pontiac Pathfinder (Canada); Pontiac Super Chief (Australia)
- Model years: 1955–1957

Body and chassis
- Body style: 2-door sedan 4-door sedan 2-door hardtop 4-door hardtop 2-door station wagon 4-door station wagon
- Layout: FR layout
- Platform: GM A platform
- Related: Chevrolet 210; Chevrolet Bel Air; Pontiac Safari

Powertrain
- Engine: 1955: 287.2 cu in (4.7 L) V8; 1956: 316.6 cu in (5.2 L) 2(192-205hp) or 4(216-227hp) bbl. V8; 1957: 346 cu in (5.7 L) V8
- Transmission: 3-speed manual Dual-Range Hydra-Matic; Strato-Flight Hydra-Matic

Dimensions
- Wheelbase: 122 in (3,099 mm)
- Length: 1955: 203.2 in (5,161 mm); 1956: 205.6 in (5,222 mm); 1957: 206.8 in (5,253 mm)
- Width: 75.1 in (1,908 mm)
- Height: 60.5 in (1,537 mm)
- Curb weight: 3,179–3,966 lb (1,442–1,799 kg)

The 1955 model Chieftains featured completely new chassis, body and engine. The engine was the biggest news as this was Pontiac's first V8 called the Strato Streak V8. The last time Pontiac had offered a V8 was in 1932 when the Oakland Model 301 with a flathead V8 was renamed Pontiac. The 287.2 cu in (4.7 L) engine made 173 or 180 horsepower (130 kW) at 4400 rpm depending on which version was ordered (again, the difference was due to changes in compression ratios). Later in the year, a 200-horsepower four-barrel version was added. Six cylinder models did not return and the 1955 lineup was V8-only. A six-cylinder model had been considered, but Pontiac management decided not to retain it due to slow sales—six-cylinder Pontiacs had accounted for only around 10-15% of volume since 1951. The traditional "Silver Streak" appearance five-chrome strips running down the hood and trunk were updated with a twin-stripe design.

The biggest change for 1956 was again in the engine. The new for 1955 V8 was drastically enlarged to 316.6 cu in (5.2 L). Horsepower made a considerable increase, from to 192 and 205. Otherwise, the 1956 model Chieftains received only minor updates. A padded safety dashboard was added as an option. Sales for 1956 fell off by as much as 20% over record-setting 1955, in part due to tighter credit guidelines instituted by American banks that year.

New "Star Flight" styling graced the 1957 Chieftains. This new theme included missile shaped side trim, extended rear fenders with V-shaped tips, lower hoods and massive bumpers. A new Super Chief sub-series debuted within the Chieftain line. These were the meant to be the top-of-the-line Chieftain models. Sales were 58.02% of all Pontiacs in 1957. The first "Tri-Power" Pontiac engines were offered. Once again the Pontiac V8 was enlarged. The 1957 model year saw the engine increase to 347 cu in (5.7 L), with horsepower increasing to 290 for the Chieftain models. This generation didn't experience the popularity as much as the Chevrolet Tri-Five during the same years, even though the models were very similar.

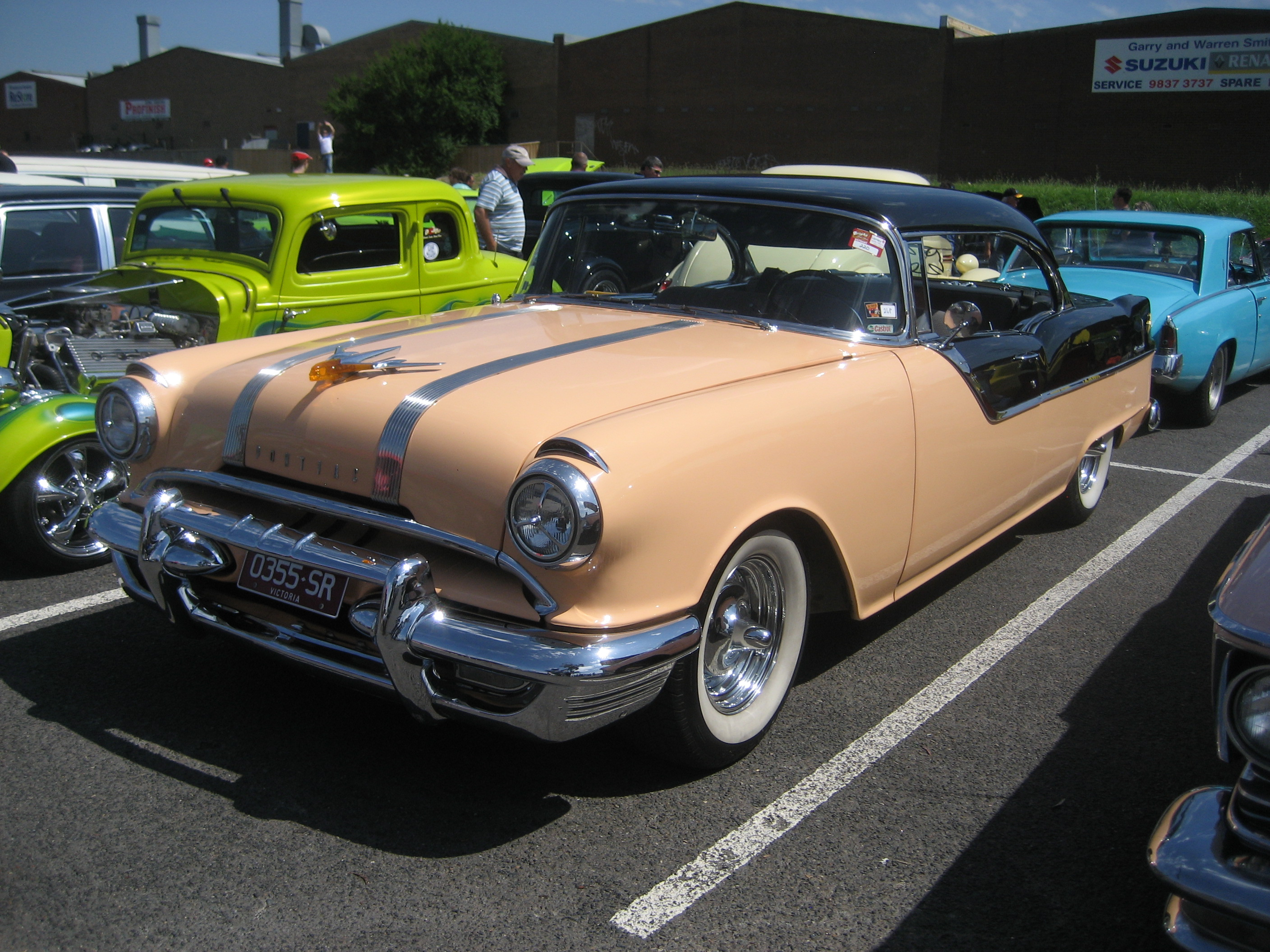
1955 Pontiac Chieftain two-door Catalina

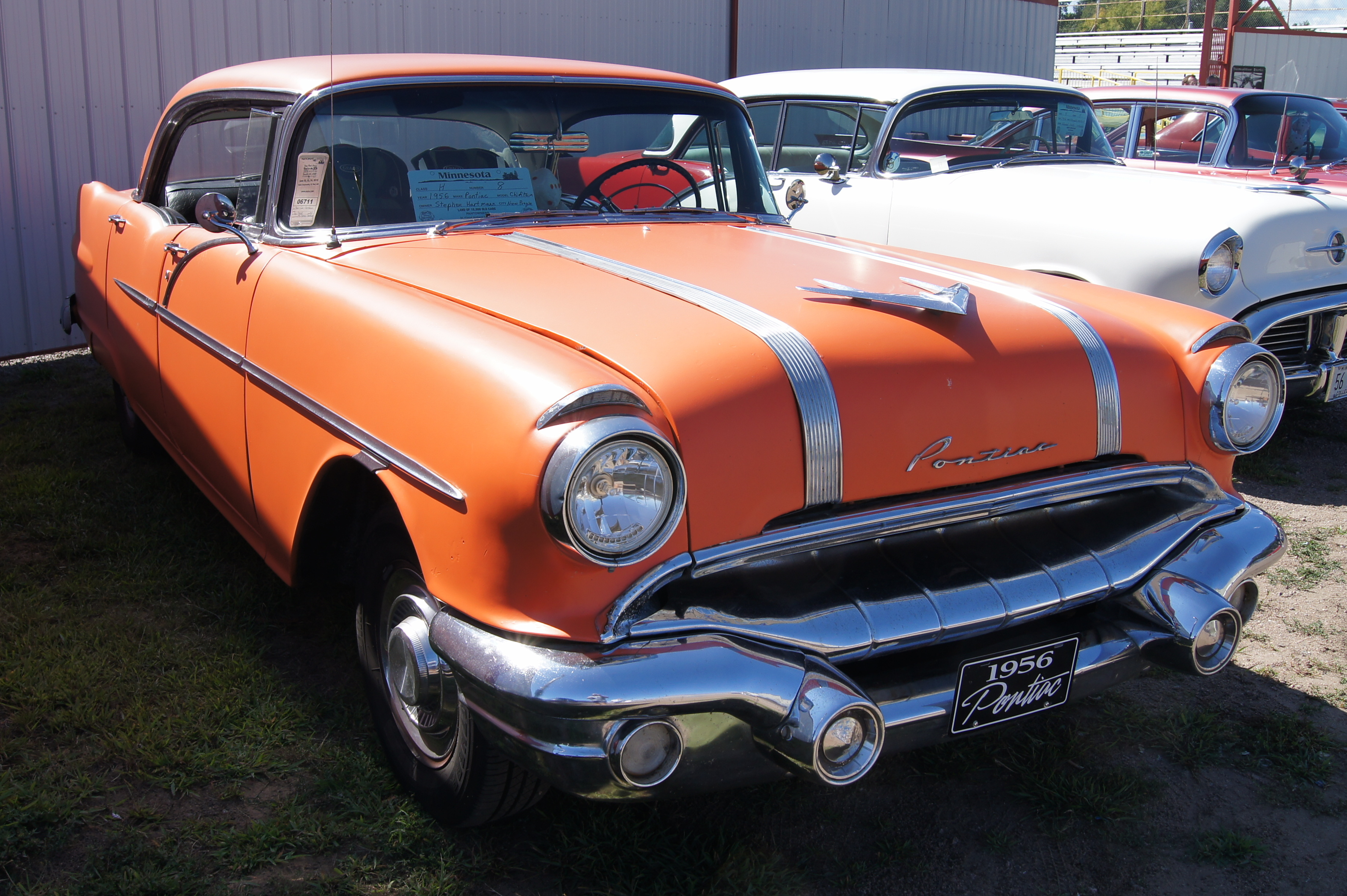
1956 Pontiac Chieftain four-door Catalina

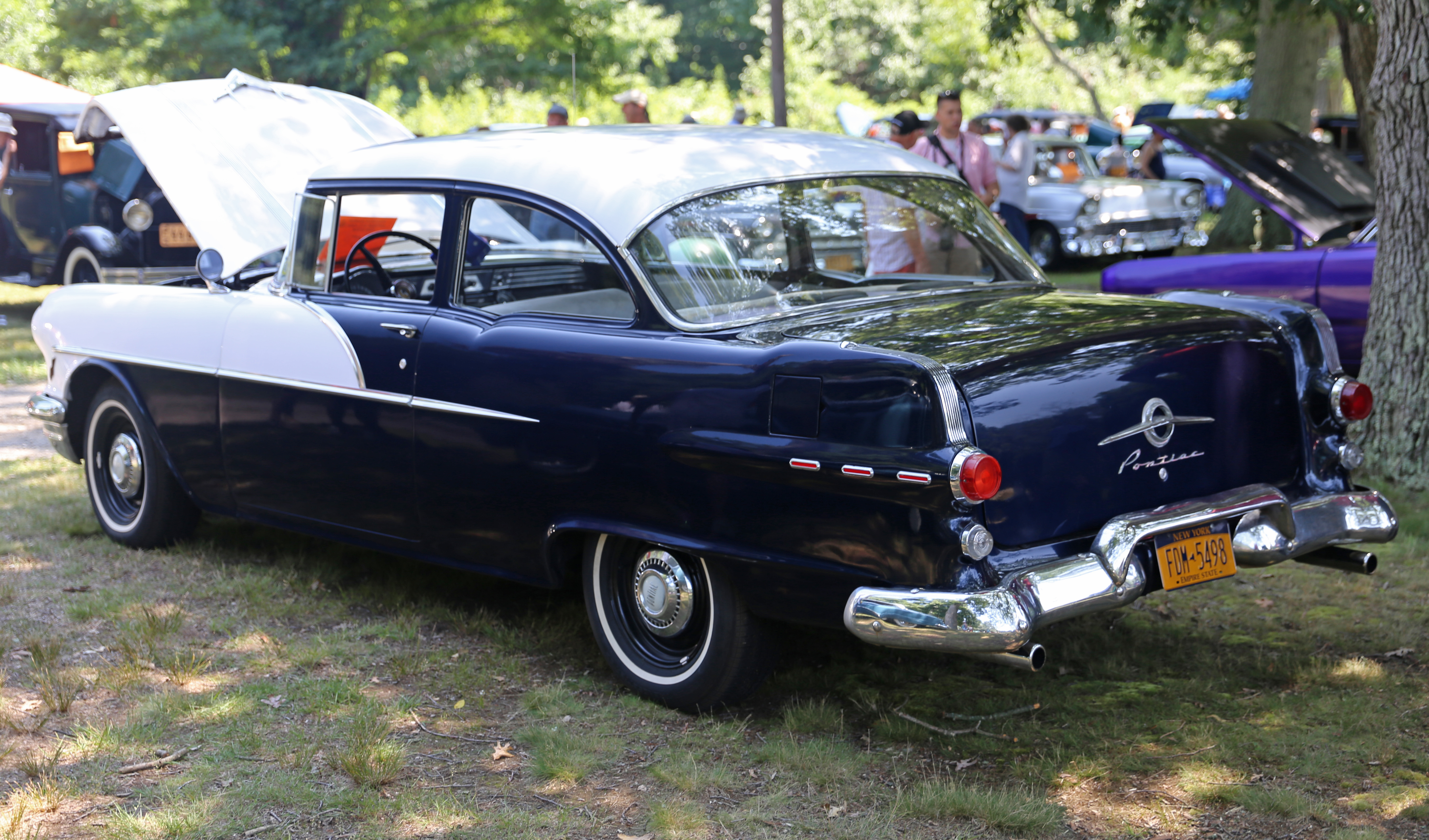
1956 Pontiac Chieftain two-door sedan

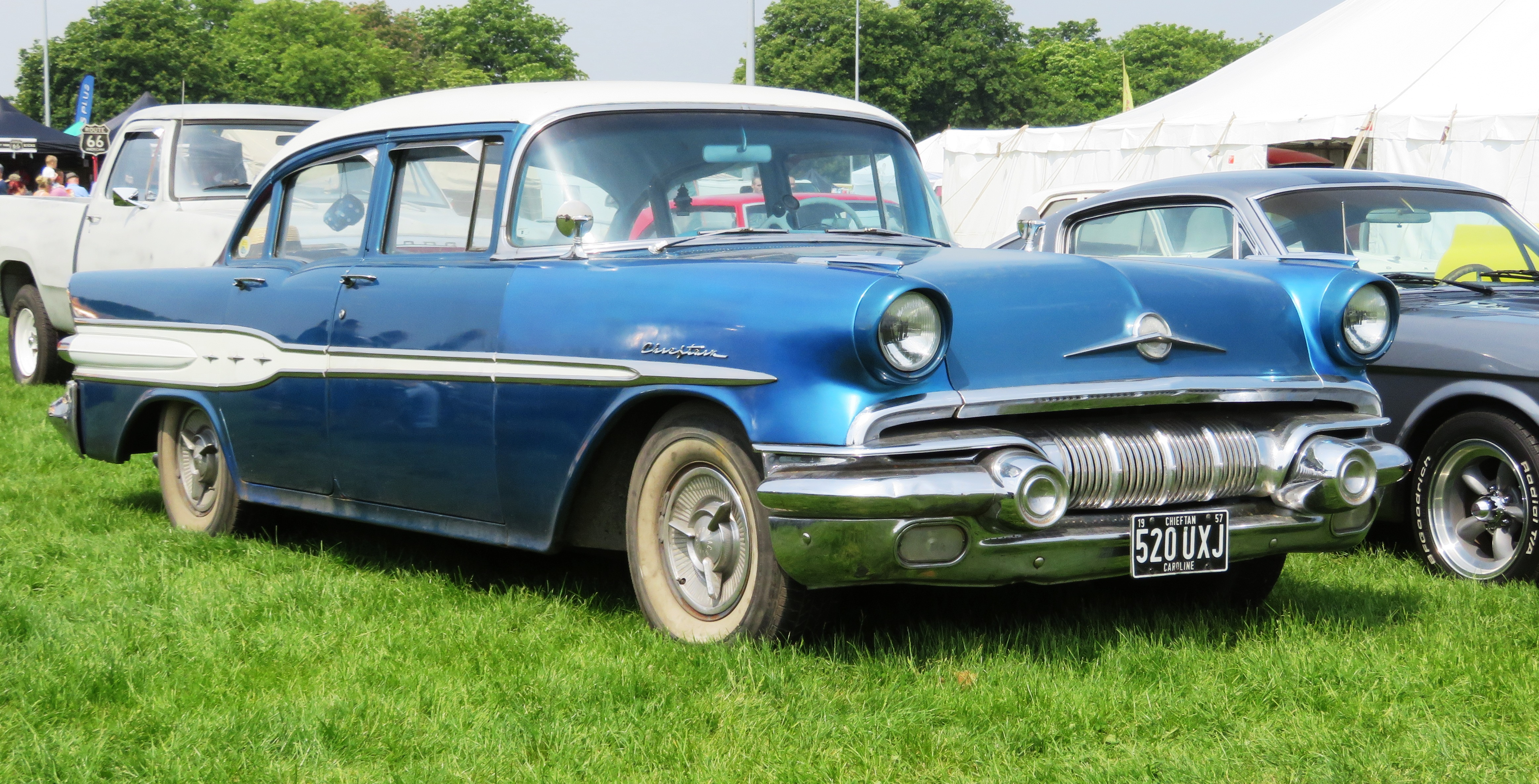
1957 Pontiac Chieftain Four-Door Sedan

=== Australian production ===
The 1957 Pontiac, badged as the Pontiac Super Chief, was assembled in Australia by Holden.

== Third generation (1958) ==
Third generation
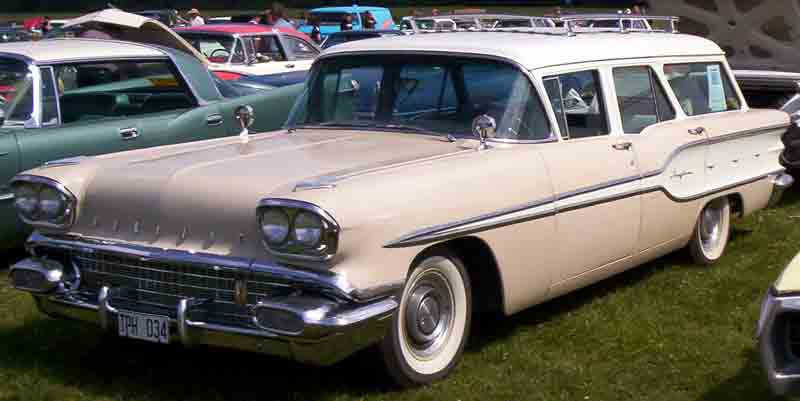
- 1958 Pontiac Chieftain Safari

Overview
- Model years: 1958

Body and chassis
- Body style: 2-door sedan 4-door sedan 2-door hardtop 4-door hardtop 2-door station wagon 4-door station wagon
- Layout: FR layout
- Platform: GM B platform
- Related: Chevrolet Biscayne; Oldsmobile 88; Buick Special

Powertrain
- Engine: 370 cu in (6.1 L) V8
- Transmission: 3-speed manual Super Hydra-Matic

Dimensions
- Wheelbase: 122 in (3,099 mm)
- Length: 210.5 in (5,347 mm)
- Width: 77.4 in (1,966 mm)
- Height: 55.7 in (1,415 mm)

Chieftains went through another major styling change in 1958. All models were given honeycomb grilles, quad head and tail lamps, concave rear fenders. The Super Chief sub-series was promoted to full model status leaving just the standard array of Chieftains as the entry level Pontiac. The "Sportable" transistor radio became an option (a portable, removable radio), along with air-suspension and a limited slip differential.

As in years past, the V8 engine was enlarged. For 1958 it grew to 370 cu in (6.1 L) and made 240 horsepower (180 kW) and 270 horsepower (200 kW) depending on version. The 1958 models were the last Chieftains to be produced. It was replaced with the all-new Catalina in 1959.

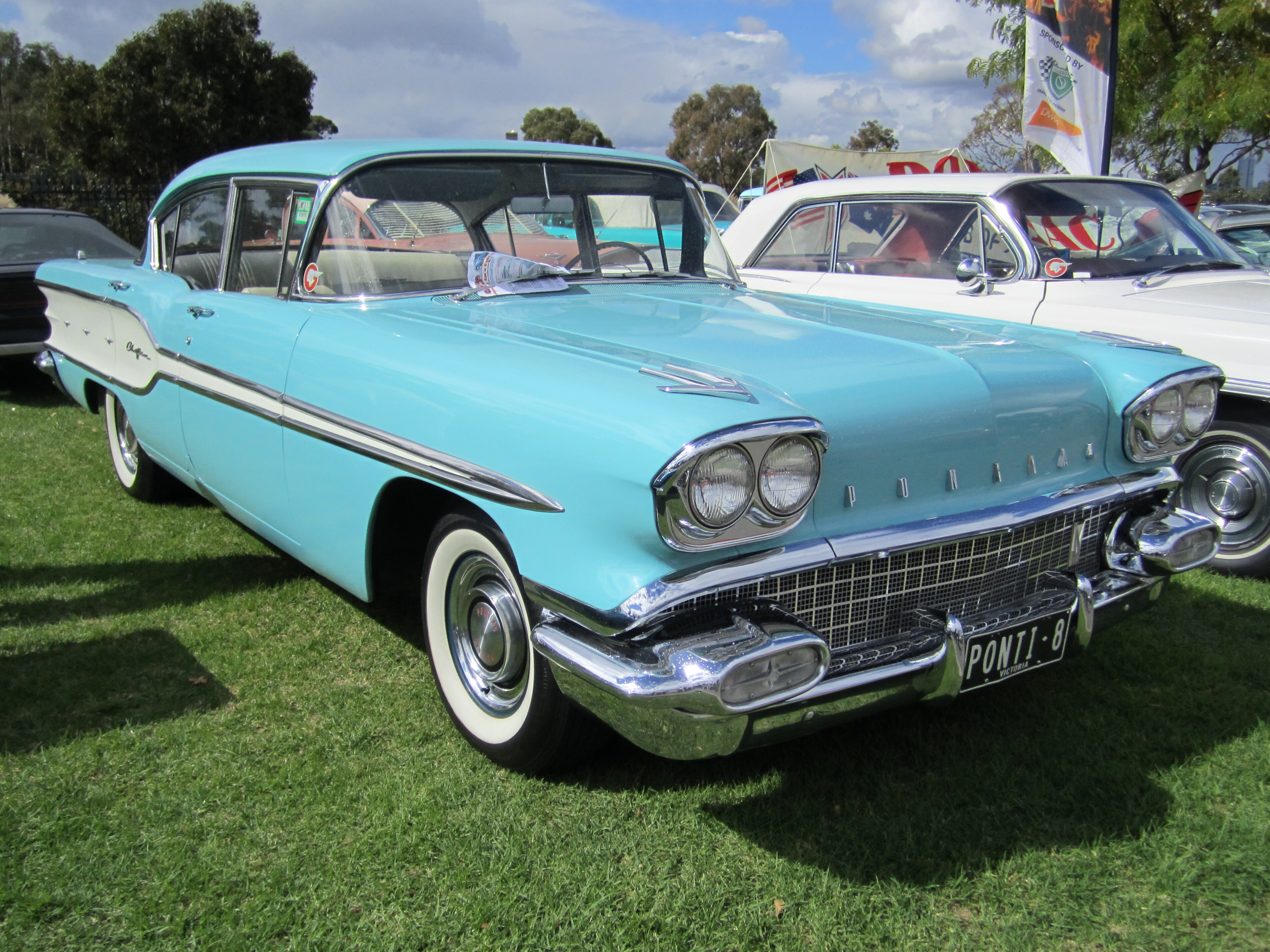
1958 Pontiac Chieftain Catalina Sedan
