= General Motors G platform =

The General Motors G platform (also called G-body) designation was used for three different automobile platforms.

- 1969–1972 General Motors G platform (RWD)
- 1982–1988 General Motors G platform (RWD)
- 1995–2011 General Motors G platform (FWD)

== See also ==
- List of General Motors platforms
