= Pontiac Custom S =

Pontiac nameplate

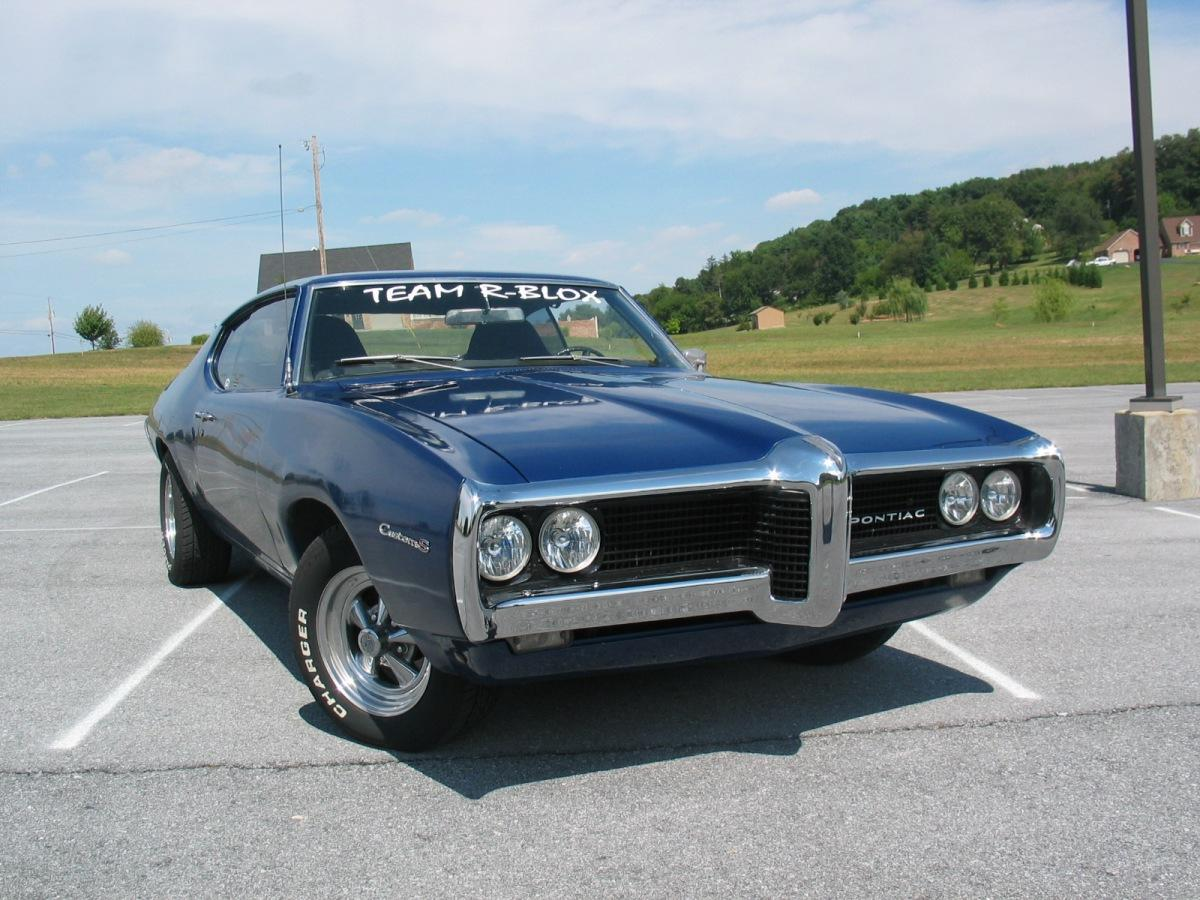
Pontiac Custom S two-door hardtop.

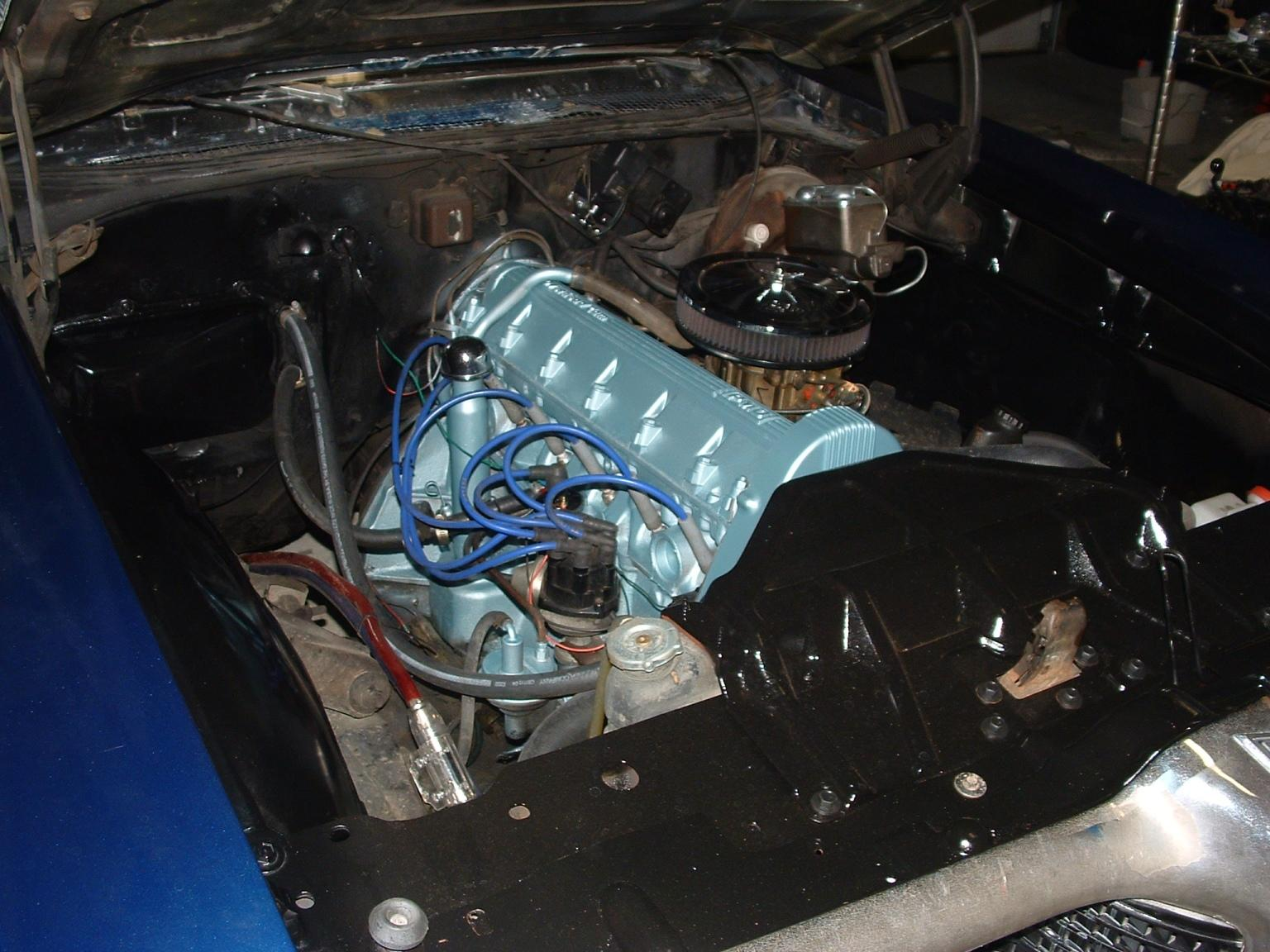
Overhead Cam Inline 6 with the "Sprint" Package.

The Pontiac Custom S was a one-year only Pontiac nameplate offered during the 1969 model year car as a replacement for the "Tempest Custom" trim level in the Division's line-up. Originally to be called the "Pontiac TC", it was slotted between the Tempest and LeMans in price and features.

== Overview ==
The Custom S was available in six different body designs: two-door convertible, hardtop coupe, sports coupe, a 4-door sedan, a 4-door hardtop, and a station wagon. The sports coupe can be differentiated from the hardtop by the presence of a vent window in the front door. Interior and exterior appointments fell between the Tempest and the LeMans and GTO.

The Custom S came standard with Pontiac's unique overhead camshaft OHC-6 175 hp 250 in^{3} engine. Also available was a 230 hp (170 kW) 265 ft⋅lbf (359 N⋅m) TQ OHC inline 6-cylinder with the "Sprint" package, a 265 hp (198 kW) overhead valve pushrod V8 350 in^{3}, and a 330 hp (250 kW) version of the same engine with higher compression and a 4-barrel carburetor.

Originally planned for 1969 was a lower-priced "econo" muscle car to be based on the Custom S series intended as a competitor to the fast-selling sub-$3,000 Plymouth Road Runner, well below the base $3,500 to $4,500-$5,000 optioned-out GTO and similar upscale muscle cars. This car was to be built on the two-door pillared coupe body style and be powered by the 330-horsepower 350 HO V8 with other equipment including the Custom S's bench-seat interior and exterior with Carousel Red paint, Rally II wheels sans trim rings and sporty striping. This car, which was said to have been named the "Pontiac ET" (for elapsed time), was presented to division officials but rejected as presented. Instead of the lower-priced muscle car concept, Pontiac decided to retain the flamboyant paint job and striping ... and offer it as the expensive "The Judge" option on the GTO.

The Custom S nameplate was dropped after the 1969 model year. For 1970, that series was replaced by a new base LeMans line with the same bodystyles, while the previous up-level LeMans became the LeMans Sport. The entry level Tempest continued for one more year with a new T-37 hardtop coupe added at mid-year, that included a GT-37 option package as lower-priced junior musclecar available with 350 and 400 V8s somewhat similar to the abortive '69 ET series. The T-37 nameplate replaced Tempest entirely for the entry-level Pontiac intermediate series in 1971.
