= General Motors T platform =

The T platform, or T-body, can refer to two different automobile platforms produced by General Motors, both used for subcompact cars.

- 1974–2008 General Motors T platform (RWD)
- 1979–2016 General Motors T platform (FWD)
