= General Motors A platform =

The General Motors A platform (commonly called A-body) was an automobile platform, and was GM's original, and oldest, platform used by all early GM products, beginning with the Chevrolet Superior. From this platform, all North American platforms B, C, and D were developed.

Starting in 1926 through 1958, GM used four different designations based on different wheelbase dimensions used which helped Fisher Body standardize coachwork provided for various bodyshells/platforms with the A-body for Chevrolet, most Pontiacs, Buick, and Oldsmobile vehicles. The A-body was temporarily suspended in 1958 until it was reintroduced in 1964.

The A-body designation was resurrected in 1964 for a new series of intermediate-sized cars including the Chevrolet Chevelle, Pontiac Tempest, Oldsmobile Cutlass, and Buick Skylark. These later A-bodies underwent a switch in drive layout from rear-wheel drive to front-wheel drive in 1982. The switch in the drive layout spawned the G-body.

- 1923–1958 and 1964–1981 General Motors A platform (RWD)
- 1982–1996 General Motors A platform (FWD)

== See also ==
- List of General Motors platforms
