= Pontiac Pathfinder =

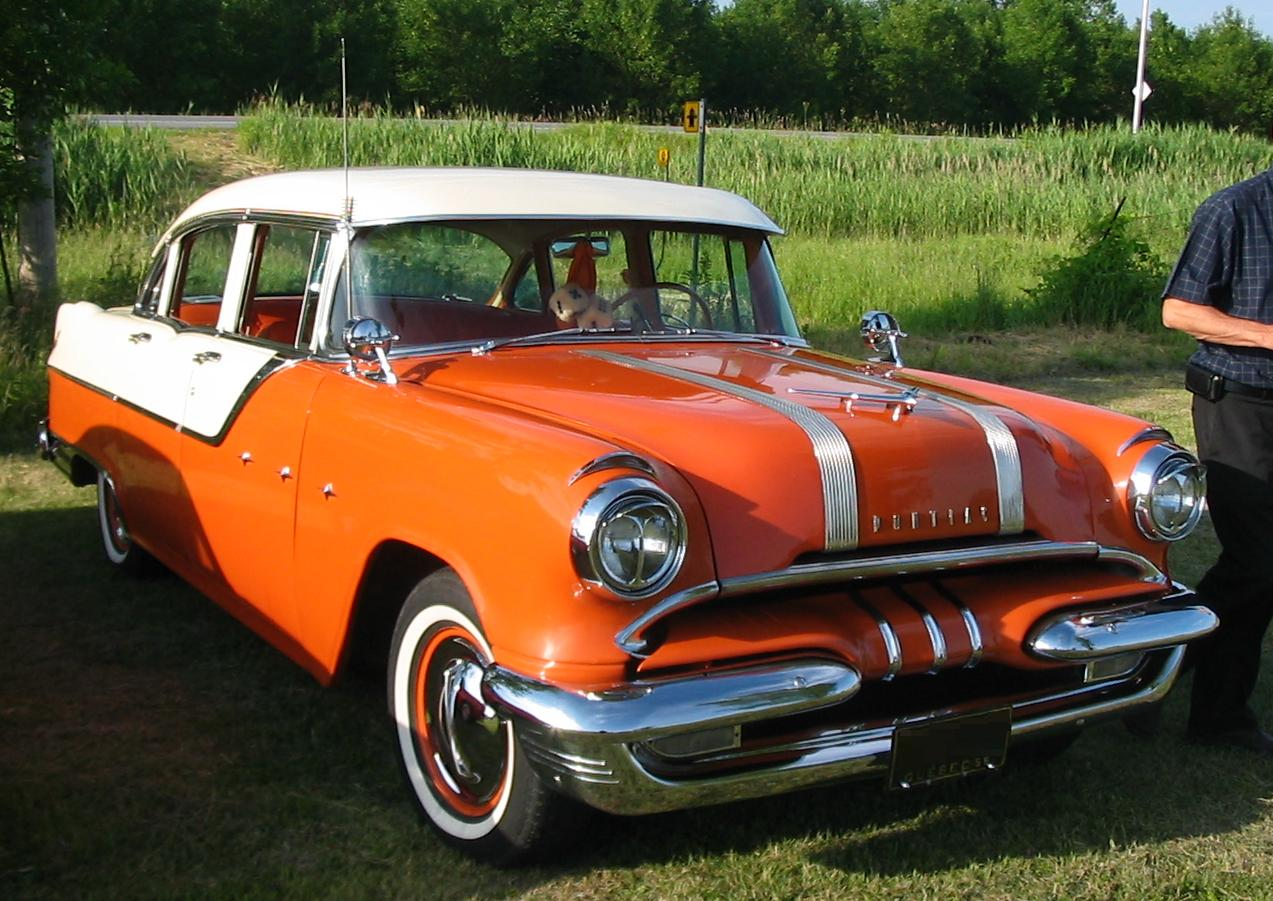
- 1955 Pontiac Pathfinder Deluxe 4-Door Sedan

Overview
- Manufacturer: General Motors
- Production: 1953–1958
- Assembly: Oshawa, Ontario, Canada

Body and chassis
- Body style: 4-door sedan
- Layout: FR layout

Powertrain
- Engine: 283 cu in (4.6 L) Pontiac V8 engine

Chronology
- Predecessor: Pontiac Fleetleader

The Pontiac Pathfinder was an entry-level full sized car or station wagon that was based on the Chevrolet marque, another General Motors brand. The Pathfinder was built and sold in Canada, and never sold in the United States. The Chevrolet chassis, engine, and body panels were used, but most of the distinctive Pontiac styling parts for each model year were incorporated. This resulted in shorter front and rear fenders than on U.S. built Pontiacs and Canadian specific wheels and hubcaps. Interior trim was often unique to the Pathfinder. The last Pathfinders were built in 1958 as Pontiac's (Canada) base model. Body styles included a sedan delivery which was Pontiac's last full-size sedan delivery, two-door coupes, four-door sedans, and a station wagon model. The Canadian built Pontiac sedan delivery was available only during the 1954 through 1958 model years since the sedan delivery was not sold in the U.S. after 1953.

The entry-level Canadian Pontiac models, from 1946 through 1953, used the shorter Chevrolet wheelbase. The 1953 model used Chevrolet taillights. The 1953 Pontiac Pathfinder De Luxe features all of the chrome bumpers and trim as the US built Pontiac Chieftain, with the exception of rear fender covers. From 1946 through 1952 these "Cheviacs" were sold as the Pontiac Fleetleader. Starting in 1954 these low-end Canadian Pontiac models (called Pontiac Pathfinders since 1953) used Chevrolet body shells and taillights, but with Pontiac features at both ends. These variants of U.S. Chevrolets are only recognized when compared to their U.S. Chevrolet or Pontiac equivalents, since body details often differ slightly between the U.S. versions of the two makes. Model year 1958 was the last for the Canada only Pathfinder models. The Pontiac Pathfinders (as well as some other Canadian models) usually had Chevrolet engines and drive trains, so that one can find Canadian Pontiacs with OHV sixes or 283 V8 engines built by Chevrolet.

Although Canada-specific models of U.S. makes were gradually phased out after Canada's "Auto Pact" treaty with the U.S. made them no longer necessary, Pontiacs manufactured and sold in Canada maintained their unique model names for many years even after the "Auto Pact" treaty took effect.

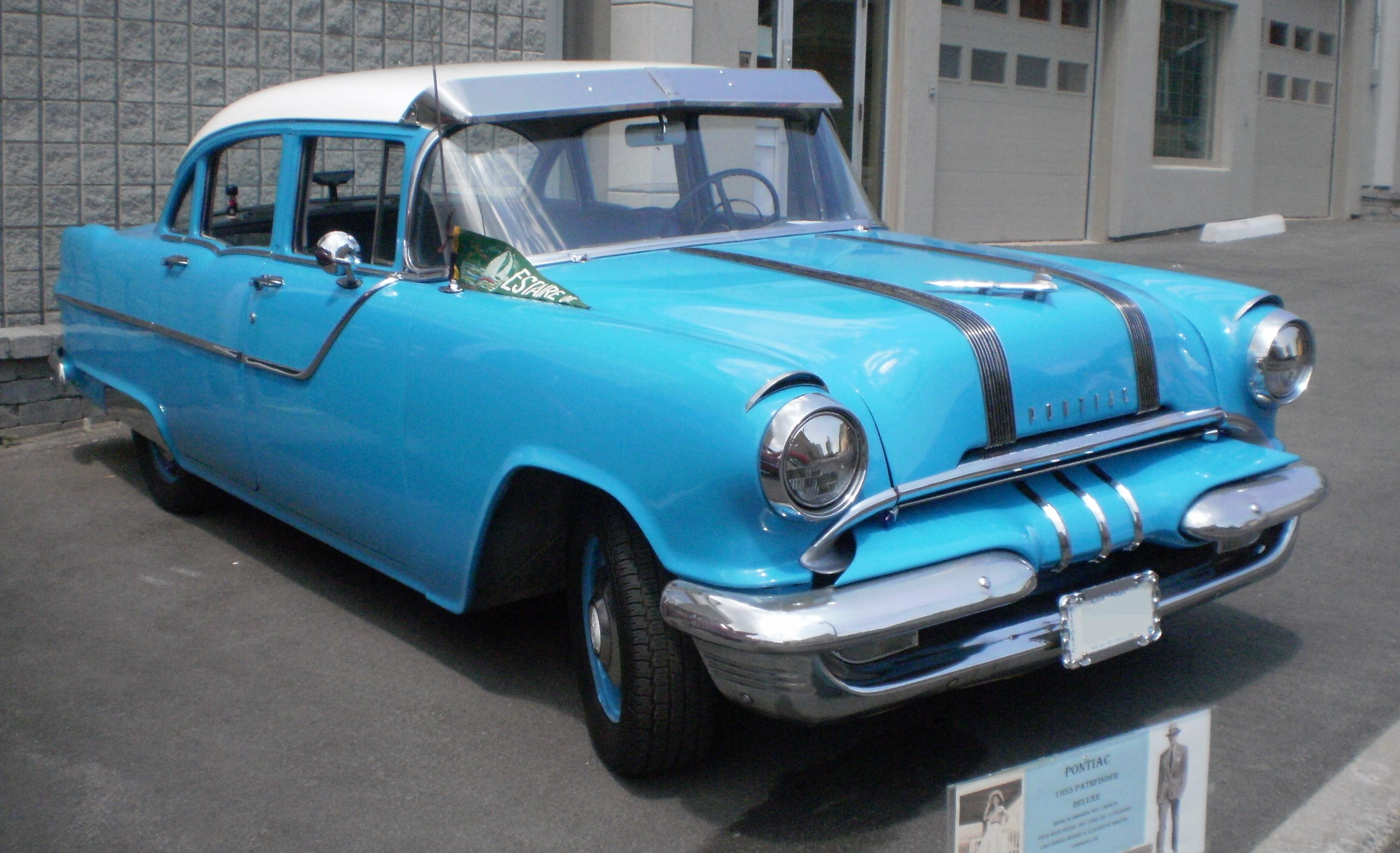
1955 Pontiac Pathfinder Deluxe 4-Door Sedan

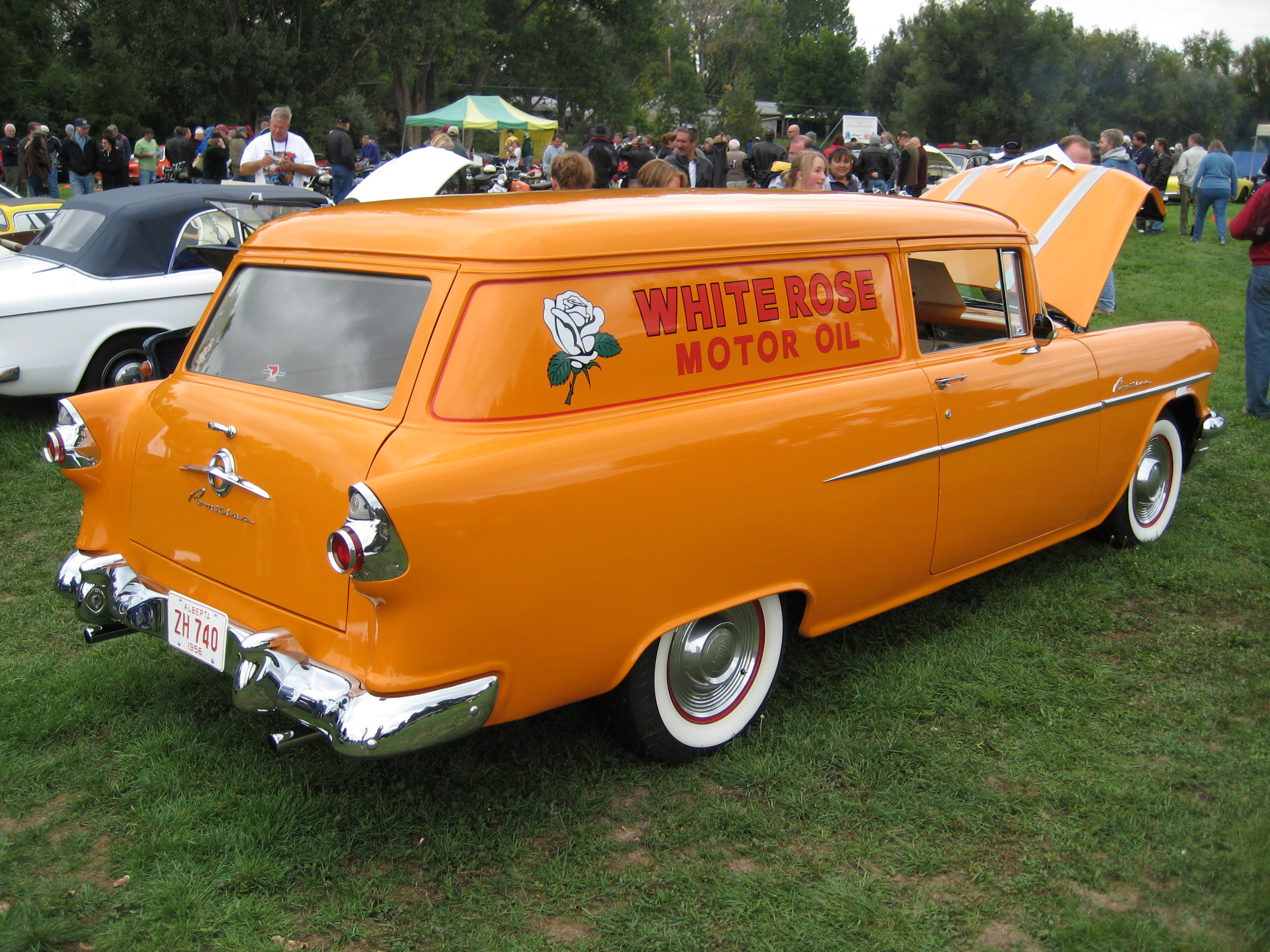
1956 Pontiac Pathfinder Sedan Delivery

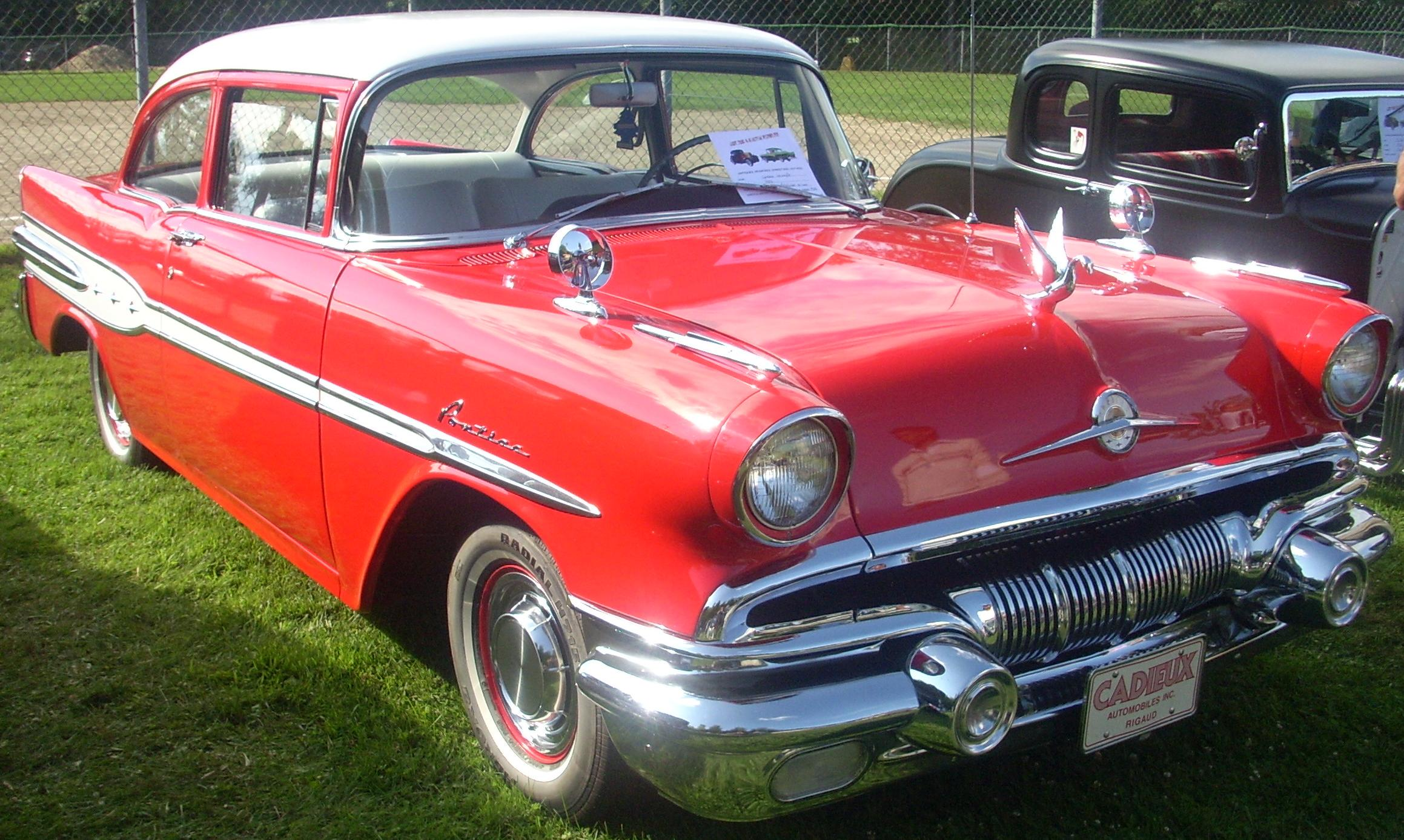
1957 Pontiac Pathfinder

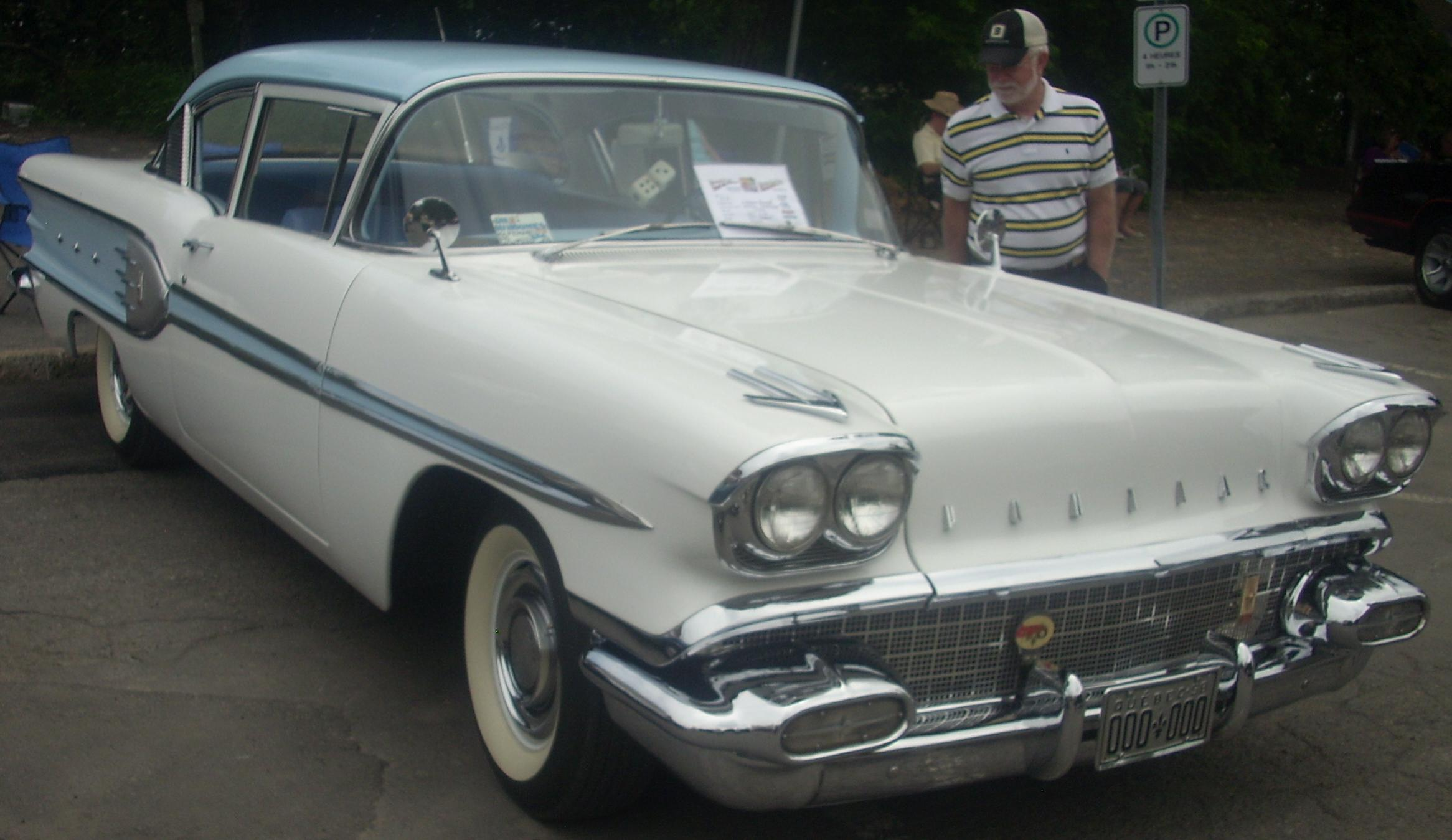
1958 Pontiac Pathfinder

== See also ==
- Panel van
