= Timeline of early North American automobiles =

This is a list of automobiles produced for the general public in the North American market from 1891 to 1915. They are listed in chronological order from when each model began its model year. If a model did not have continuous production, it is listed again on the model year production resumed. Concept cars and submodels are not listed unless they are themselves notable.

== 1891–1909 ==
Image	Year	Name	Manufacturer	Class
	1891	Buckeye gasoline buggy	—N/a	—N/a
	1893	Duryea	Duryea Motor Wagon Company	—N/a
	1894	Haynes-Apperson	Haynes-Apperson	—N/a
	1895	De La Vergne	—N/a	—N/a
	1896	Ford Quadricycle	—N/a	—N/a
	1897	Fossmobile	—N/a	—N/a
	1897	Winton Motor Carriage	Winton Motor Carriage Company	—N/a
	1898	Altham	Altham International Motor Car Company	—N/a
	1899	Hertel	Oakman Motor Vehicle Company	—N/a
	1899	Packard Model A	Packard Motor Car Company	—N/a
	1899	Quinby	J. M. Quinby & Company	—N/a
	1899	Riker	Riker Electric Vehicle Company	—N/a
	1899	Winton Stanhope	Winton Motor Carriage Company	—N/a
	1900	Grout	Grout	—N/a
	1900	Kensington Stanhope	The Kensington Automobile Company	—N/a
	1900	Locomobile	Locomobile Company of America	—N/a
	1900	Mobile	Mobile Company of America	—N/a
—N/a	1900	Packard Model B	Packard Motor Car Company	—N/a
	1900	Porter Stanhope	Porter Motor Company	—N/a
	1900	Robinson runabout	Robinson Motor Vehicle Company	—N/a
	1900	Searchmont Wagonette	Searchmont Motor Company	—N/a
	1900	Skene	Skene American Automobile Company	—N/a
	1900	Stearns Electric carriage	Stearns Steam Carriage Company	—N/a
	1901	Kidder Model 2	Kidder Motor Vehicle Company	—N/a
	1901	Model A Three-wheeler Runabout	Knox Automobile Company	—N/a
	1901	Oldsmobile Curved Dash	Oldsmobile	Entry-level car
—N/a	1901	Packard Model C	Packard Motor Car Company	—N/a
—N/a	1901	Packard Model F	Packard Motor Car Company	—N/a
	1901	Waverley Electric	Pope-Waverley	—N/a
	1901	Rambler	—N/a	—N/a
	1901	Robinson Touring	Robinson Motor Vehicle Company	—N/a
	1901	Searchmont Type III	Searchmont Motor Company	—N/a
	1901	Steamobile	Steamobile Company of America	—N/a
	1901	Hampden Phaeton	Stevens-Duryea	—N/a
	1901	St. Louis	St. Louis Motor Company	—N/a
	1902	Cadillac Runabout	Cadillac Automobile Company	—N/a
—N/a	1902	Cadillac Tonneau	Cadillac Automobile Company	—N/a
	1902	Covert	Covert Motor Vehicle Company	—N/a
	1902	Searchmont Type V Tonneau	Searchmont Motor Company	—N/a
	1902	Smith	Smith Automobile Company	—N/a
	1902	American C. G. V.	Smith and Mabley	—N/a
	1902	Stanley Steamer	Stanley Motor Carriage Company	—N/a
	1902	Stearns Steam Stanhope	Stearns Steam Carriage Company	—N/a
—N/a	1903	Cadillac Model A	Cadillac Automobile Company	—N/a
	1903	Columbia Electric Runabout	Columbia	—N/a
	1903	Ford Model A	Ford Motor Company	—N/a
	1903	Jaxon Steam Car	Jackson Automobile Company	—N/a
	1903	Model C Runabout	Knox Automobile Company	—N/a
	1903	Long Distance 7-hp Runabout	U. S. Long Distance Automobile Company	—N/a
	1903	Model R Runabout	Oldsmobile	Entry-level car
	1903	Waverley Electric Model 21	Pope-Waverley	—N/a
	1903	Searchmont Type VII Touring	Searchmont Motor Company	—N/a
	1903	Stearns Model H	Stearns Steam Carriage Company	—N/a
	1903	Stearns Runabout	Stearns Steam Carriage Company	—N/a
	1903	Stevens-Duryea Model L	Stevens-Duryea	—N/a
	1903	St. Louis	St. Louis Motor Company	—N/a
	1904	Cadillac Model B	Cadillac Automobile Company	—N/a
	1904	Ford Model B	Ford Motor Company	Upscale
	1904	Ford Model C	Ford Motor Company	Entry-level car
	1904	Grout	Grout	—N/a
	1904	Touraine Runabout	Knox Automobile Company	—N/a
	1904	Eldredge Runabout	National Sewing Machine Company	—N/a
	1904	Model 6C Runabout	Oldsmobile	Entry-level car
	1904	Packard Model L	Packard Motor Car Company	—N/a
	1904	Peerless Type 8 Style K	Peerless Motor Company	—N/a
	1904	Pope-Robinson Touring	Pope-Robinson	—N/a
	1904	Queen Runabout	Queen	—N/a
	1904	Simplex Model BA	Smith and Mabley	—N/a
	1904	Standard	Standard Motor Construction Company	—N/a
	1904	St. Louis	St. Louis Motor Company	—N/a
	1905	Buffum	H.H. Buffum Co.	—N/a
	1905	Cadillac Model C	Cadillac Automobile Company	—N/a
	1905	Cadillac Model D	Cadillac Automobile Company	—N/a
	1905	Cadillac Model E	Cadillac Automobile Company	—N/a
	1905	Cadillac Model F	Cadillac Automobile Company	—N/a
	1905	Ford Model F	Ford Motor Company	Entry-level car
	1905	Grout	Grout	—N/a
	1905	Jaxon Model C	Jackson Automobile Company	—N/a
	1905	Model F Surrey	Knox Automobile Company	—N/a
	1905	Northern 18-hp Touring	Northern Motor Car Company	—N/a
	1905	Model B Runabout	Oldsmobile	Entry-level car
	1905	Packard Model N	Packard Motor Car Company	—N/a
	1905	Waverley Electric	Pope-Waverley	—N/a
	1905	Smith Surrey	Smith Automobile Company	—N/a
	1905	Simplex 30 hp	Smith and Mabley	—N/a
	1905	Standard	Standard Motor Construction Company	—N/a
	1905	Stevens-Duryea Model R Touring	Stevens-Duryea	—N/a
	1905	Orient 20 HP De Luxe Touring	Waltham Manufacturing Company	—N/a
	1906	Adams-Farwell	Adams Company	—N/a
—N/a	1906	Cadillac Model H	Cadillac Automobile Company	—N/a
	1906	Cadillac Model K	Cadillac Automobile Company	—N/a
—N/a	1906	Cadillac Model L	Cadillac Automobile Company	—N/a
	1906	Cadillac Model M	Cadillac Automobile Company	—N/a
	1906	Ford Model K	Ford Motor Company	Upscale
	1906	Ford Model N	Ford Motor Company	Entry-level car
	1906	Four Cylinder Touring	Gaeth	—N/a
	1906	Model G Touring	Knox Automobile Company	—N/a
	1906	Oldsmobile Model S	Oldsmobile	—N/a
	1906	Rainier Model B	Rainier Motor Car Company	—N/a
	1906	Smith 24-hp Touring	Smith Automobile Company	—N/a
	1906	Smith Four-cylinder Touring	Smith Automobile Company	—N/a
	1906	Simplex Model AA	Smith and Mabley	—N/a
	1906	Simplex Model DA	Smith and Mabley	—N/a
	1906	Stevens-Duryea Model S Big Six Touring	Stevens-Duryea	—N/a
	1906	Waltham Orient Buckboard	Waltham Manufacturing Company	—N/a
	1907	Cadillac Model G	Cadillac Automobile Company	—N/a
	1907	Detroit Electric	Anderson Electric Car Company	—N/a
—N/a	1907	Ford Model R	Ford Motor Company	Entry-level car
—N/a	1907	Ford Model S	Ford Motor Company	Entry-level car
	1907	Locomobile Type E	Locomobile Company of America	—N/a
	1907	Oldsmobile Model A	Oldsmobile	—N/a
	1907	Waverley Electric	Pope-Waverley Model 60C	—N/a
	1907	Great Smith Touring Car	Smith Automobile Company	—N/a
	1907	Stevens-Duryea Model U Touring	Stevens-Duryea	—N/a
	1908	Cadillac Model S	Cadillac Automobile Company	—N/a
—N/a	1908	Cadillac Model T	Cadillac Automobile Company	—N/a
	1908	Elmore Model 40	Elmore Manufacturing Company	—N/a
	1908	Lozier Model I	Lozier	—N/a
	1908	Oldsmobile Model M	Oldsmobile	—N/a
	1908	Oldsmobile Model X	Oldsmobile	—N/a
	1908	Oldsmobile Model Z	Oldsmobile	—N/a
	1908	Packard Model Thirty	Packard Motor Car Company	—N/a
	1908	Rainier Model D	Rainier Motor Car Company	—N/a
	1908	Richmond Model J	Richmond	—N/a
	1908	Stevens-Duryea Model U Limousine	Stevens-Duryea	—N/a
	1908	Winton touring car	Winton Motor Carriage Company	—N/a
	1909	Cadillac Model Thirty	Cadillac Automobile Company	—N/a
	1909	Cartercar Model H Touring	Cartercar	—N/a
	1909	Ford Model T	Ford Motor Company	Economy car
	1909	Model O Tonneauette	Knox Automobile Company	—N/a
	1909	Locomobile 30(L)	Locomobile Company of America	—N/a
	1909	Oldsmobile Model D	Oldsmobile	—N/a
	1909	Stevens-Duryea Model XXX	Stevens-Duryea	—N/a
	1909	Stevens-Duryea Model X	Stevens-Duryea	—N/a
	1909	Stevens-Duryea Model Y 6-40	Stevens-Duryea	—N/a
	1909	Welch-Detroit Model S	Welch Motor Car Company	—N/a

== 1910–1915 ==
Image	Year	Name	Manufacturer	Class
	1910	Cartercar	Cartercar	—N/a
	1910	Model S Touring	Knox Automobile Company	—N/a
	1910	McLaughlin Model 41 touring	McLaughlin Motor Car Company	—N/a
	1910	Oldsmobile Limited	Oldsmobile	—N/a
	1910	Packard Eighteen Series NB	Packard Motor Car Company	—N/a
	1910	Stevens-Duryea Model AA	Stevens-Duryea	—N/a
	1910	Winton Six	Winton Motor Carriage Company	—N/a
	1911	American Underslung	American Motor Car Company	—N/a
	1911	Peerless Six Model 32 Roadster	Peerless Motor Company	—N/a
	1911	OctoAuto	Reeves Sexto-Octo Company	—N/a
	1911	Great Smith Cruiser	Smith Automobile Company	—N/a
	1911	Great Smith Touring Car	Smith Automobile Company	—N/a
	1911	Stearns	F. B. Stearns Company	—N/a
	1912	Cartercar	Cartercar	—N/a
	1912	Cartercar Model R	Cartercar	—N/a
	1912	Metz Model 22 runabout	Metz Company	—N/a
	1912	Metz Model 22 Roadster	Metz Company	—N/a
	1912	Oldsmobile Series 40	Oldsmobile	—N/a
	1912	Peerless Six Model 38 Berline	Peerless Motor Company	—N/a
	1912	Rauch & Lang	The Rauch & Lang Carriage Company	—N/a
	1912	SextoAuto	Reeves Sexto-Octo Company	—N/a
	1912	Stanley Steamer	Stanley Motor Carriage Company	—N/a
	1913	Chevrolet Series C Classic Six	Chevrolet	Full-size
	1913	Metz runabout	Metz Company	—N/a
	1913	Series V-N3 Tonneau	National Motor Vehicle Company	—N/a
	1913	Oldsmobile Six	Oldsmobile	—N/a
	1913	Rambler Touring	Rambler	—N/a
	1913	Stevens-Duryea Model C-Six	Stevens-Duryea	—N/a
	1914	Chevrolet Series H	Chevrolet	Mid-size
	1914	Chevrolet Light Six	Chevrolet	Full-size
	1914	Peerless Six Model 60 7-Passenger Touring	Peerless Motor Company	—N/a
	1914	Rocket Cyclecar	Scripps-Booth	—N/a
	1914	Bearcat	Stutz Motor Car Company	—N/a
	1914	Bearcat	Stutz Motor Car Company	—N/a
	1915	Cadillac Type 51	Cadillac Automobile Company	Luxury car
	1915	Chevrolet Series H-2 Royal Mail	Chevrolet	Mid-size
	1915	McLaughlin touring	McLaughlin Motor Car Company	—N/a
	1915	Oldsmobile Model 43	Oldsmobile	—N/a
	1915	Pierce-Arrow Touring Car	Pierce-Arrow Motor Car Company	—N/a
	1915	Scripps-Booth Coupe	Scripps-Booth	—N/a
	1915	Stevens-Duryea Model D-Six	Stevens-Duryea	—N/a

== See also ==
- History of the automobile
- History of the internal combustion engine
- Timeline of motor vehicle brands
