= Oldsmobile Series 20 =

Car model

Overview
- Manufacturer: General Motors
- Production: 1909
- Model years: 1909
- Assembly: United States: Lansing, Michigan (Lansing Car Assembly)

The Series 20 was an automobile produced by Oldsmobile division of General Motors in 1909. When the Oldsmobile Company joined General Motors in 1908, the Series 20 was one of the first examples of platform sharing that became GM's most notable business model, as it was derived from the previously established Buick brand from the Buick Four. The Series 20 effectively replaced the Model F, also known as the Curved-Dash Oldsmobile, when it was discontinued when GM assumed operations, and was replaced by the 1914 Oldsmobile Model 42 "Baby Olds". It was the entry-level vehicle below the Oldsmobile Model A and the luxury sedan Oldsmobile Model Z. It was the first Oldsmobile to use numbers to identify the product, a tradition that would last until the company concluded operations in 2004.

== History ==
The Series 20 was equipped with a side-valve, in-line 2,704 cc four-cylinder engine developing 22 bhp. The engine was installed in the front, driving the rear wheels through a transmission shaft. The gearbox had three forward gears, with the gearshift lever positioned to the right of the driver.

The brake pedal came into contact with the engine's crankshaft, while the parking brake came into contact with a brake drum on the rear wheels. The Series 20 was available with only four doors. The headlights used acetylene.

A total of 6,575 Oldsmobile vehicles were manufactured in 1909, with 5,325 of those being the Series 20.
