= Straight-six engine =

Internal combustion engine

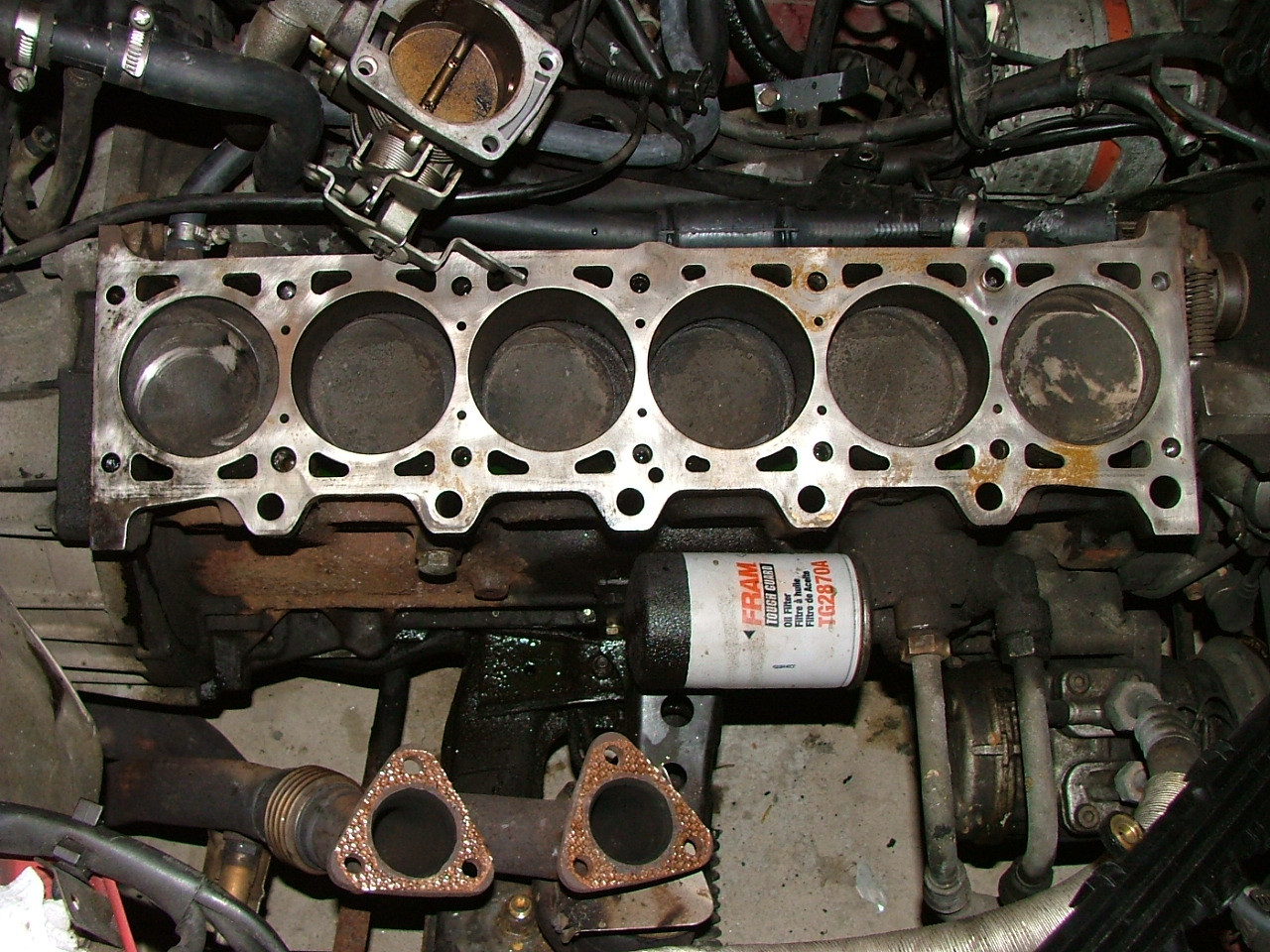
Engine block of a BMW M20 straight-six engine (top view with cylinder head removed)

A straight-six engine (also referred to as an inline-six engine; abbreviated I6 or L6) is a piston engine with six cylinders arranged in a straight line along the crankshaft. A straight-six engine has perfect primary and secondary engine balance, resulting in fewer vibrations than other designs of six or fewer cylinders.

Until the mid-20th century, the straight-six layout was the most common design for engines with six cylinders. However, V6 engines gradually became more common in the 1970s and by the 2000s, V6 engines had replaced straight-six engines in most light automotive applications.

Due to their high and smooth torque, simplicity and reliability, weight and space, and balanced power delivery, straight-six engines are a common power source for trucks and buses.

== Characteristics ==
In terms of packaging, straight-six engines are almost always narrower than a V6 engine or V8 engine, but longer than straight-four engines, V6s, most V8s and V10s. Compared to V-configuration engines with similar power and displacement, the straight configuration has fewer injectors, a single head, and a single exhaust manifold, all contributing to better reliability and performance.

Straight-six engines are typically produced in displacements ranging from 2 to 4 L (122 to 244 cu in), however engines range in size from the 0.7 L (43 cu in) Benelli 750 Sei motorcycle engine to the 10,972.2 L (669,565 cu in) Wärtsilä-Sulzer RTA96-C two-stroke marine diesel engine. Due to its well-balanced configuration, the straight-six can be scaled up to substantial sizes for heavy trucks, locomotives, industrial and marine use.. When two straight-six engines are mated with a common crankshaft it forms a V12 engine.

=== Engine balance and vibration ===
Typical firing order of 1-5-3-6-2-4

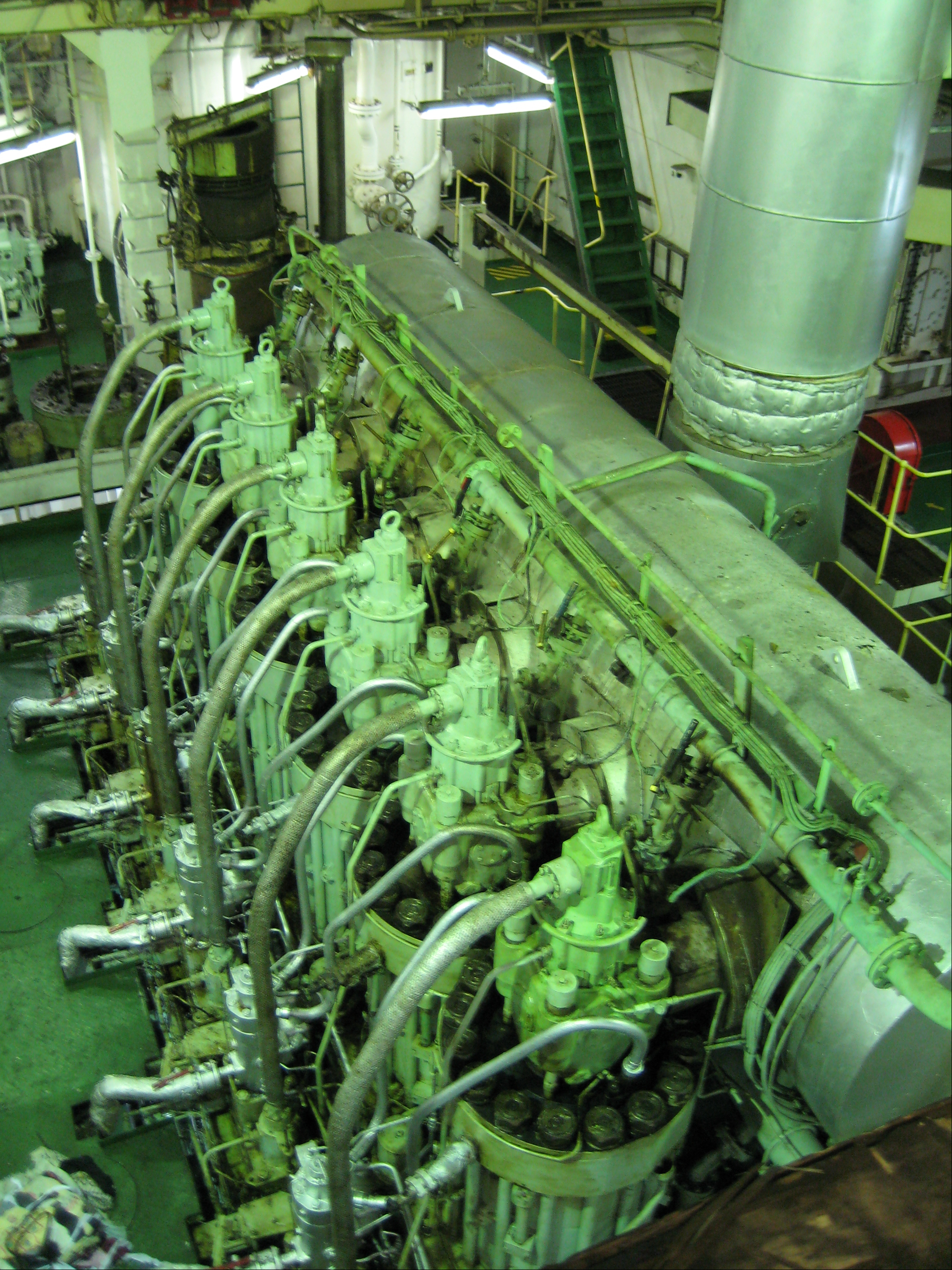
3890-litre MAN B&W 6S60MC marine diesel engine

If an appropriate firing order is used, a straight-six engine has perfect primary and secondary engine balance. The primary balance is due to the front and rear trio of cylinders moving in pairs (albeit 360° out of phase), thus canceling out the rocking motion present in a straight-three engine. The secondary balance is due to the crank throws being arranged in three planes offset at 120°, resulting in the non-sinusoidal forces summing to zero for all free forces until the sixth order.

The engine balance characteristics of a straight-six engine compare favorably with the more common straight-four engines, V6 engines, and V8 engines which experience significant secondary dynamic imbalance, resulting in engine vibration. As engine reciprocating forces increase with the cube of piston bore, the straight-six is a preferred configuration for large truck and industrial engines.

=== Two-stroke engines ===
An even-firing six-cylinder two-stroke engine requires ignitions at 60° intervals, or else it would run with simultaneous ignitions and be no smoother than a triple in power delivery. As such, it also requires crank throws at 60° – . Such designs appear to have been limited to diesel engines such as the Detroit 71 series, marine engines, and outboard motors.

Some of the 120 possible crankshaft configurations have useful properties. Still, all of them have a rocking imbalance that may or may not require a balance shaft, depending on the application. The six pistons with six unique phases cannot be "paired" as in the four-stroke case. The Detroit engines used a configuration that, once the primary rocking couple was balanced out, was also perfectly balanced at all other rocking couples until the 6th order. Mercury came to use a configuration that canceled only the primary rocking couple and was run without a balancer.

The reciprocating masses of all configurations are still imbalanced at only 6th-order and up in their plane of motion. Still, the balance of kinetic energy exchange between pistons has improved to a residual 6th-order-and-up inertial torque oscillation compared with the four-stroke design being imbalanced at 3rd-order and up.

=== Crankshaft ===
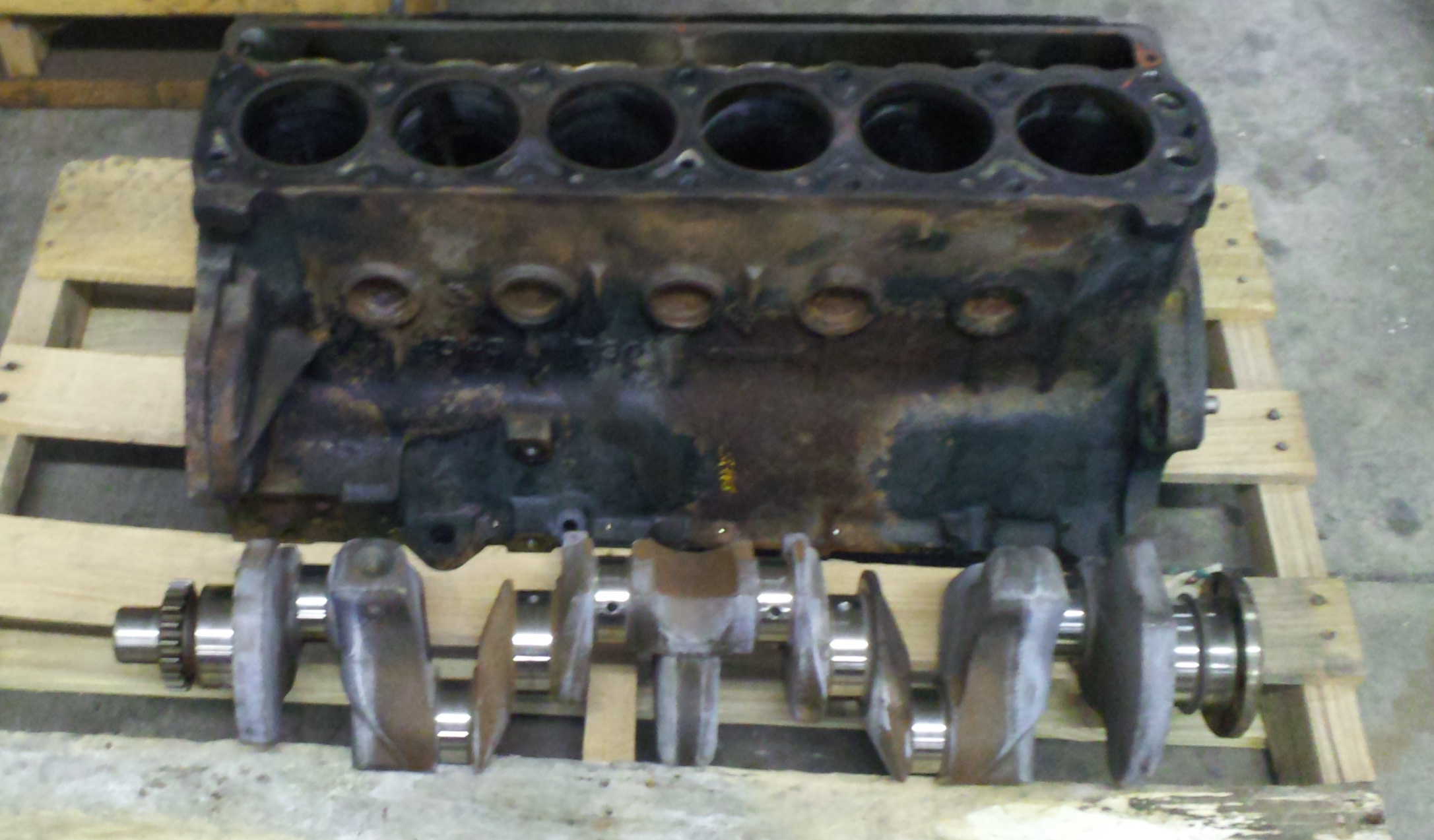
Crankshaft with four main bearings

Crankshafts for straight-six engines usually have either four main bearings (i.e., a bearing in between each pair of crankpins and one at each end) or seven main bearings (i.e., a bearing between every crankpin):

- Large displacement and diesel engines typically use seven bearings to minimize crankshaft flex. When an engine is subject to high loads at low speeds, the greater distance between main bearings causes increased crankshaft flex. Modern high-compression engines subject the crankshaft to greater bending loads from higher peak gas pressures, requiring the crank throws to have more significant support from adjacent bearings. So, it is common for straight-six engines to use seven main bearings.
- Smaller and high-performance engines typically use four bearings since having fewer main journals decreases friction and increases the torsional stiffness of the crankshaft. The lack of torsional stiffness can make the seven main bearing designs susceptible to torsional flex and potential breakage at high engine speeds. Any torsional flex in the crankshaft is compounded by the torsional flex of the camshafts for the rear cylinders since the camshafts are rather long and subject to torsional flex. At high engine speeds, the combination of camshaft and crankshaft flex results in inaccurate timing of the valve openings, which, in the worst case, can cause the valves and pistons to collide with catastrophic results.

== Usage in cars ==
The first production straight-six engine was introduced in the Dutch Spyker 60 HP racing car in 1903. Straight-six engines increased in popularity in the years after and by 1909, approximately 80 manufacturers were using them (including 62 in the United Kingdom). Prior to the 1950s, V6 engines were rarely used, due to the poorer engine balance of V6 engines compared to straight-six engines. Since the 1980s, however, the shorter length of V6 engines has seen most manufacturers replace straight-six engines with V6 engines. An exception to this trend is the German brand BMW, which has always used a straight-six layout for its six-cylinder engines.

Since 2017, the trend of switching to V6 engines has reversed due to the ability to create a modular engine family of straight engines sharing many components. Examples include the 2017–present Mercedes-Benz M256 engine, the 2019–present Jaguar Land Rover Ingenium engines (AJ300 and AJ300D versions), the 2021–present Stellantis Hurricane engine and the 2022–present Mazda Skyactiv-X and Skyactiv-D engines.

=== Europe ===
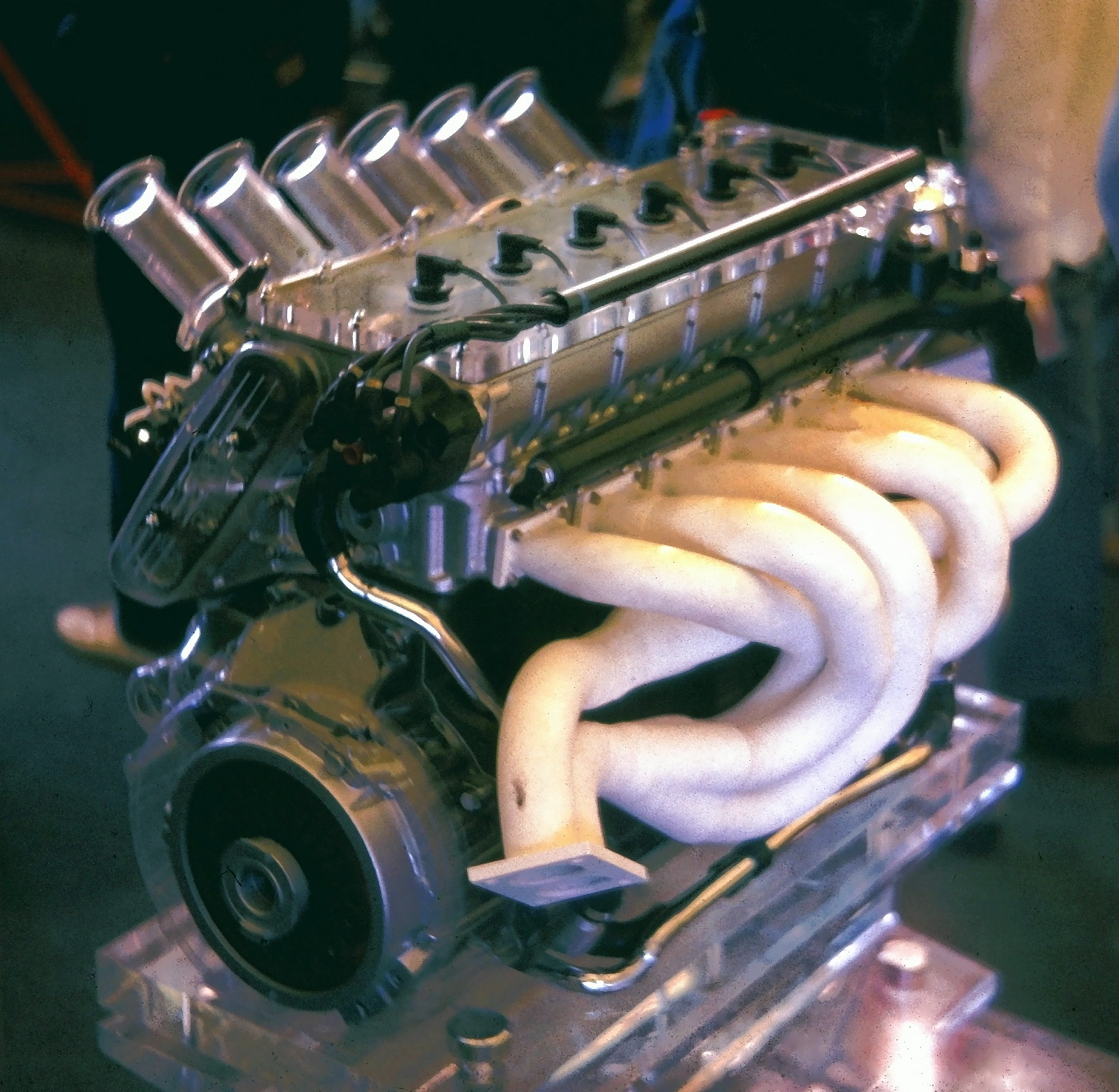
1978–1981 BMW M88 engine

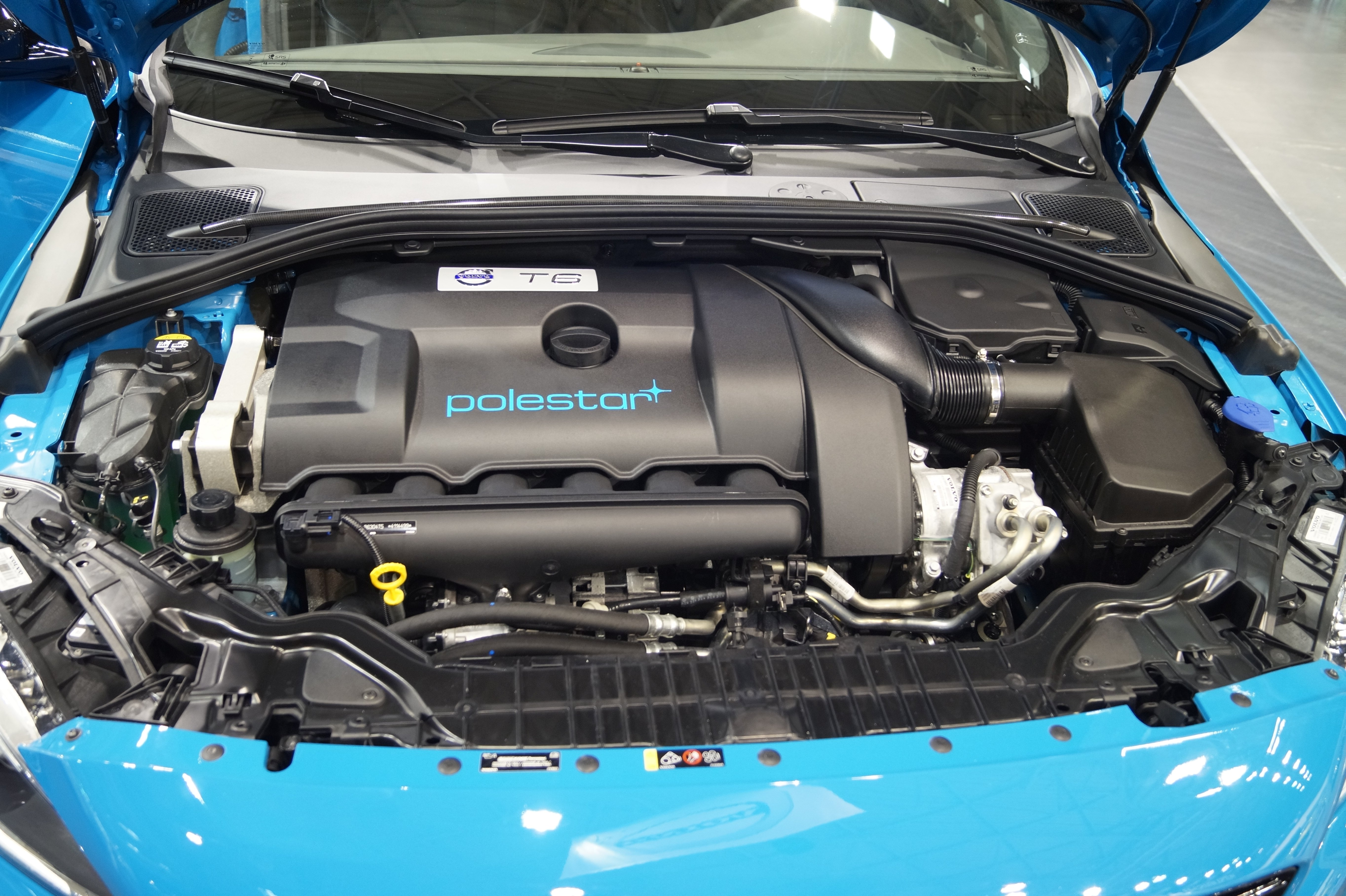
2014–2016 Volvo SI6 engine (transversely mounted)

Alfa Romeo's first production straight-six engine – 6.3 L flathead petrol engine – was introduced in 1921 in the Alfa Romeo G1 luxury car. An overhead valve design was introduced in the 1922 Alfa Romeo RL sports car, and an overhead camshaft design was used in the 1927 Alfa Romeo 6C sports car and various racing cars from 1927 until 1954. The last Alfa Romeo model using a straight-six was the 1961–1969 Alfa Romeo 2600 executive car before the company switched to V6 engines.

Mercedes-Benz's history of straight-six engines began with the 1913 Mercedes D.I aircraft engine. The first automotive straight-six engine was the 1924–1929 Daimler M836 3.9 L petrol engine. Following World War 2, Mercedes resumed production of straight-six engines with the 1951 introduction of the Mercedes-Benz M180 overhead camshaft engine. In 1985, the Mercedes-Benz OM603 3.0 L diesel straight-six engine was introduced. In 1996, the company replaced its petrol straight-sixes with a series of V6 engines, although it continued producing diesel straight-six engines. Production of petrol straight-six engines resumed in 2017 with the introduction of the Mercedes-Benz M256 turbocharged DOHC engine.

Opel began production of straight-six engines in 1927 with a 1.8 L flathead petrol engine used by the Opel 8/40 PS. The displacement of this engine was expanded as it was used in later models such as the Opel Kapitän and Opel Admiral, with later versions switching to an overhead valve (pushrod) design. In 1968, the straight-six versions of the Opel CIH engine were introduced, initially using a single overhead camshaft (SOHC) with some later versions using double overhead camshafts (DOHC). Production of the Opel CIH engine continued until 1993, when a V6 engine replaced it.

Volvo began production of straight-six engines with the 1929–1958 Penta DB flathead petrol engines. The company resumed production in 1969 with the Volvo B30 overhead valve petrol engine, followed by the straight-six versions of the Volvo Modular Engine introduced in 1995 and then the Volvo SI6 engine introduced in 2006. Several models (such as the 1998–2006 Volvo S80) used the uncommon design of a transversely-mounted straight-six engine. Production of Volvo straight-six engines ceased in 2015.

BMW's first product was the 1917 BMW IIIa straight-six aircraft engine. The company began production of automotive straight-six engines in 1933 with the BMW M78 petrol engine, a 1.2 L overhead valve design that evolved over the years into the BMW M337 (produced until 1958). Production of straight-six engines resumed in 1968 with the BMW M30 single overhead camshaft engine, built for 27 years and used in various models. The 1978–1989 BMW M88 engine was a double overhead camshaft design that was introduced in the BMW M1 mid-engine sports car. BMW's introduction of turbocharged straight-six engines (aside from the low-volume variants of the M30 engine in the 1980s) was in 2006 BMW N54 and the production of naturally aspirated engines ceased in 2015. As of 2022, the BMW B58 turbocharged straight-six engine remains in production, along with its higher performance BMW S58 variants.

=== United Kingdom ===
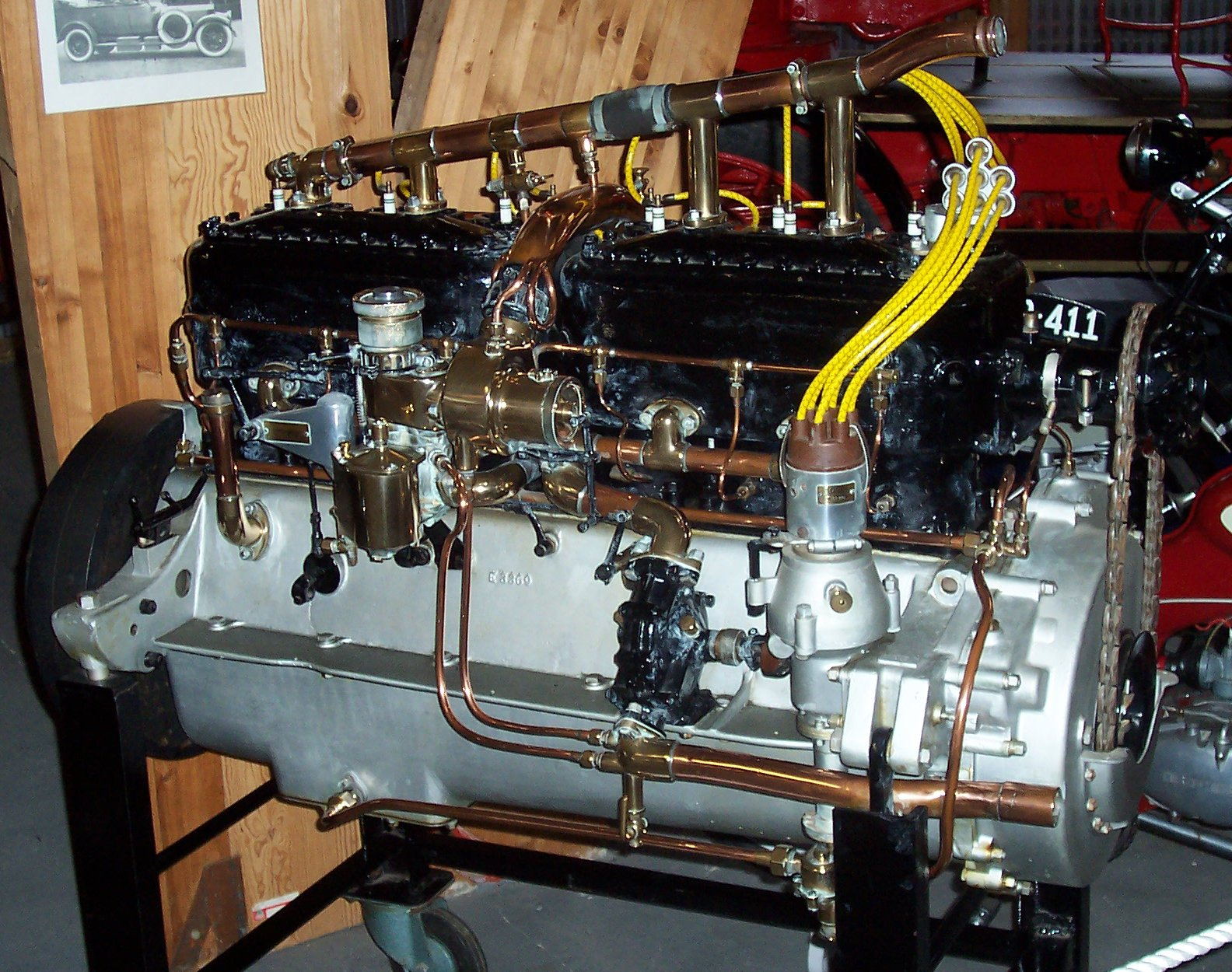
Rolls-Royce Silver Ghost flathead engine

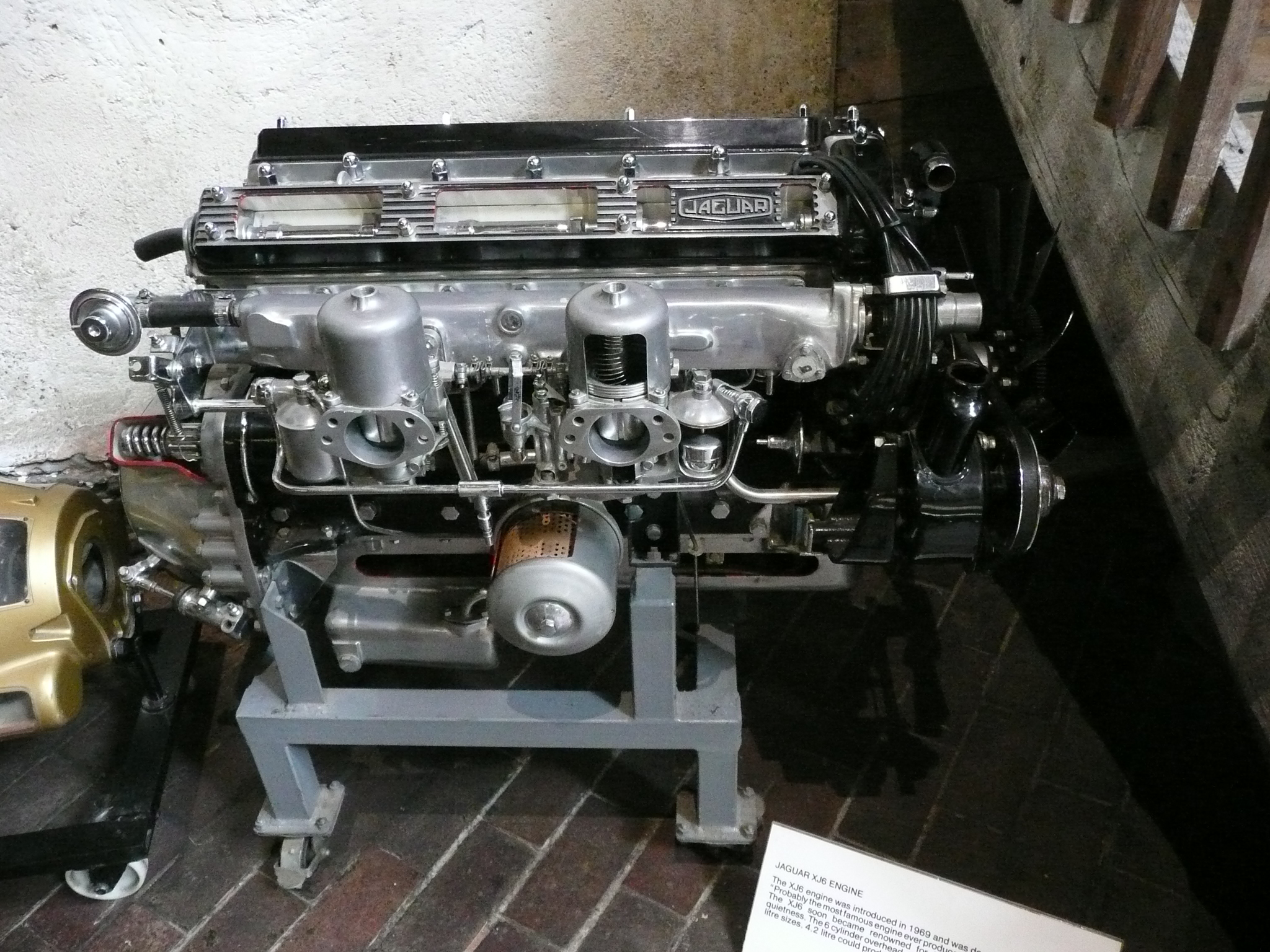
1969 Jaguar XK DOHC engine

Rolls-Royce's first straight-six engine was a 6.0 L IOE petrol engine, which was used in the 1905 Rolls-Royce 30 hp luxury car. This car was replaced by the 1906–1926 Rolls-Royce Silver Ghost, which switched to a flathead (side-valve) design for its straight-six engine.

In 1906, the Standard Six luxury car was introduced, powered by a 20 hp (15 kW; 20 PS) I6 petrol engine. Standard's engines were also used in several cars built by SS Cars and its successor Jaguar, such as the 1932 SS 1 sports car, the 1936 SS Jaguar 100 and the 1938 Jaguar 3½ Litre sports saloon/coupe and the 1948 Jaguar Mark V luxury car.

The 1927 Rover Two-litre luxury car introduced the company's IOE straight-six petrol engine. This engine was used in various Rover models until the Rover P5 was discontinued in 1973, and in various Land Rover models from the 1961 Land Rover Series IIA until 1980 Land Rover Series III.

The 1928 Austin 20/6 luxury car introduced Austin's flathead straight-six petrol engine. The 1938–1939 Austin Twenty-Eight used an enlarged version of this engine. This was replaced by the Austin D-Series engine, an overhead valve engine initially designed for trucks, which was used in passenger cars from 1947 until 1968 (along with several Jensen Motors models from 1946 to 1962). The overhead valve BMC C-Series was used by various BMC brands from 1954 to 1971, followed by the 2.2 L version of the BMC E-Series overhead camshaft engine, which was produced from 1970 until 1982.

The 1930–1936 Wolseley Hornet six lightweight car was powered by a 1.3–1.6 L overhead camshaft straight-six petrol engine.

The 1931–1932 MG F-type tourers, 1932–1934 MG K-type sports cars, and 1934–1936 MG N-type sports cars were powered by an overhead camshaft straight-six petrol engine.

During the mid-1930s, the Riley MPH sports car and Riley Kestrel 6 saloon were produced in small numbers and were powered by dual overhead camshaft straight-six petrol engine.

The 1947 Bristol 400 luxury car was powered by an overhead valve straight-six petrol engine based on the design of the BMW M328 engine. This engine remained in use until the Bristol 406 was discontinued in 1961.

The dual overhead camshaft Jaguar XK6 engine petrol engine was produced from 1948 to 1992, initially in the Jaguar XK120 sports car. Introduced as a 3.4 L, it was used in passenger and racing cars, winning the Le Mans 24 hour race seven times. The XK6 engine was followed by the AJ6 and AJ16 engines, produced from 1984 to 1996, before being replaced by a Ford-derived V6 engine.

The 1948–1959 Lagonda straight-6 dual overhead camshaft petrol engine was used in various Aston Martin and Lagonda cars. This engine's successor was the Tadek Marek-designed straight-six used in the DB4 (1958), DB5 (1963), DB6 (1965) and DBS (1967).

The Ford Zephyr 6 overhead valve engine was used in the Ford Zephyr executive car and several other models from 1951 to 1966.

The Triumph I6 overhead valve straight-six petrol engine was produced from 1960 to 1977 and debuted in the Standard Vanguard Six sports saloon. The Leyland PE166 engine was loosely based on the Triumph design and was produced from 1977 to 1986.

The 1972–1977 TVR 2500M sports car was powered by the Triumph I6 engine. Then, from 1999 to 2007, TVR's own TVR Speed Six dual overhead camshaft engine was used in several of the company's sports cars.

=== United States ===
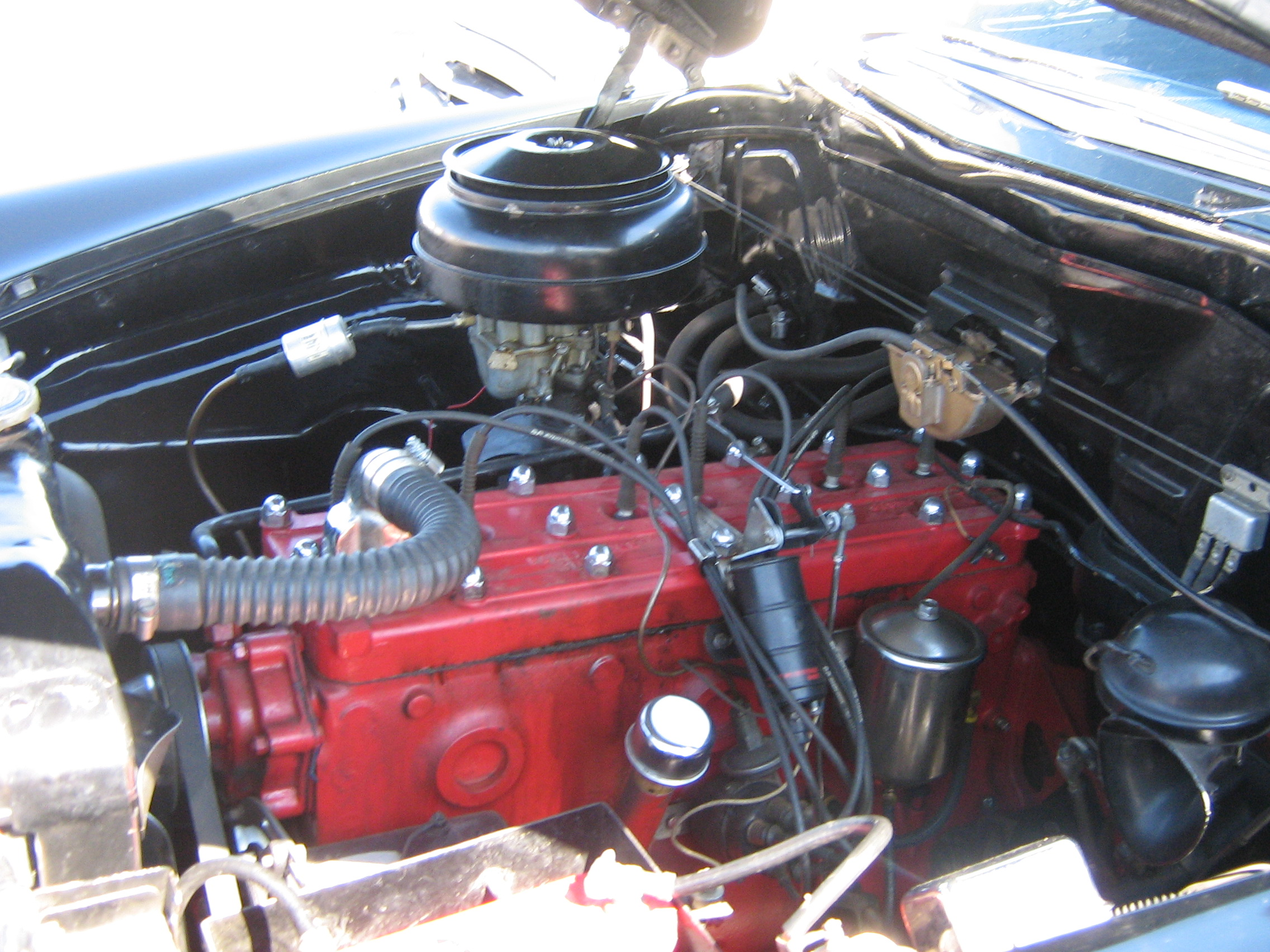
1954 Hudson Wasp engine

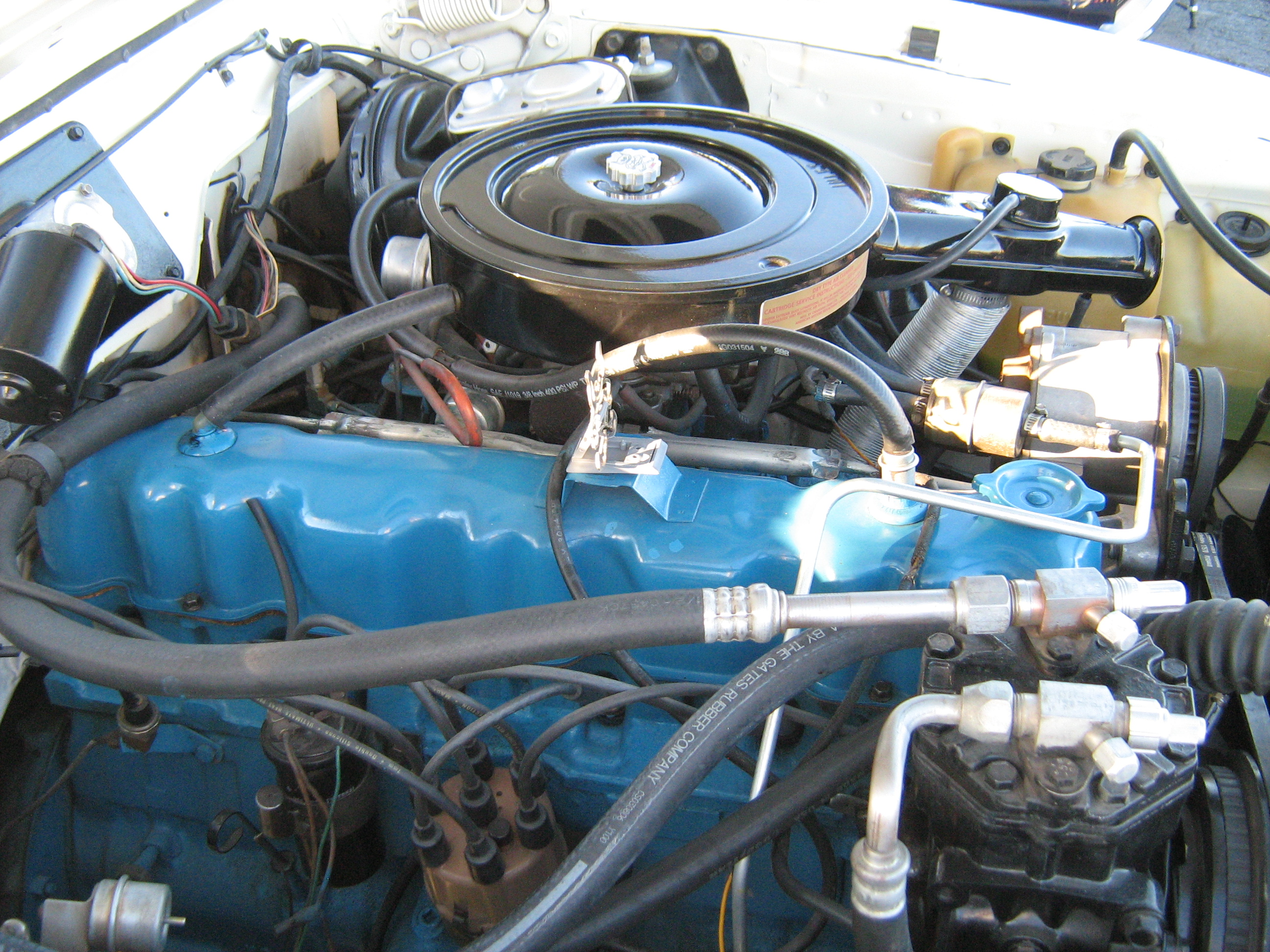
1977 AMC straight-6 engine

The 1906–1908 Ford Model K luxury car used a 405 cu in (6.6 L) straight-six petrol engine and was the only Ford six-cylinder passenger car engine until the 1940s. The Ford flathead I6 was produced from 1941 until 1951, followed by the Ford OHV I6 overhead valve engine from 1952 through 1964, then the Ford Thriftpower Six overhead valve engine from 1960 until 1982, and the Ford 240 I6 from 1965 through 1972. The Ford 300 cu in (4.9 L) version of the straight-six engine was built from 1965 until 1996, with notable uses in trucks, SUVs, and vans. However, Ford straight-sixes were replaced by V6 engines in passenger cars during the mid-1970s.

In 1908, the Oldsmobile Model Z was powered by a flathead straight-six petrol engine, which was produced until 1912 (in the Oldsmobile Limited luxury car) in displacements of 453 cu in (7.4 L), 505 cu in (8.3 L) and 706 cu in (11.6 L). Oldsmobile's next straight-six engine was introduced in the 1913 Oldsmobile Six luxury car, initially with a displacement of 380 cu in (6.2 L), followed by a displacement of 177 cu in (2.9 L) for the 1917–1921 Oldsmobile Model 37 luxury car. The later generations of the Oldsmobile Straight-6 also used a flathead design from its introduction in the 1923 Oldsmobile Model 30 luxury car until it was replaced in 1950 by Oldsmobile's V8 engine.

The 1913–1929 Oakland Six luxury car was powered by a flathead petrol engine produced in displacements of 177 cu in (2.9 L) and 334 cu in (5.5 L). In 1926, the Pontiac Six was introduced as a lower-cost version of the Oakland six, powered by the Pontiac Split-Head Six flathead engine, which used two cylinder heads. This engine was replaced by the 1941–1954 Pontiac flathead six. The unrelated Pontiac OHV 6 overhead valve engine was produced in 1964–1965, based on a Chevrolet design. Pontiac's final straight-six engine was the 1966–1969 Pontiac OHC 6 overhead camshaft engine, which was replaced by Chevrolet's straight-six engine and Buick's V6 engine.

The overhead valve Buick Straight-6 petrol engine was introduced in the 1914 Buick Six luxury car and was produced until 1930. Buick did not make another six-cylinder engine until they introduced a V6 engine in 1962.

The 1916 through 1926, Hudson Super Six was powered by a 289 cu in (4.7 L) straight-six petrol engine. This was followed by an IOE version in 1916. The 1951 Hudson Hornet introduced a 308 cu in (5.0 L) flathead straight-six engine. These engines dominated dirt track and NASCAR racing at the time. Production of the Hudson I6 continued after the 1954 merger forming American Motors Corporation and was eventually replaced by a new Rambler V8 after 1956.

In 1924, Chrysler began production of a straight six version of the Chrysler flathead petrol engine. This was replaced by the 1959–2000 Chrysler Slant-6 overhead valve straight-six petrol engine, which was so named due to the 30-degree angle used to reduce the height of the engine (with the trade-off of a wider engine). The Slant-6 was released in the Dodge Dart economy car and used in many models until a V6 engine replaced it after 30 years.

The Chevrolet Stovebolt overhead valve straight-six petrol engine was introduced in 1929 as a replacement for the brand's straight-four engines and was produced in displacements of 181 cu in (3.0 L), 194 cu in (3.2 L) and 207 cu in (3.4 L). The second generation of this engine family – often referred to as the Blue Flame engine – was produced from 1937 to 1962 in displacements of 216 cu in (3.5 L), 235 cu in (3.9 L) and 261 cu in (4.3 L). This was followed by the 1962–1988 Chevrolet Turbo-Thrift engine (also using an overhead valve design), which was replaced by various General Motors V6 engines.

The 1952 through 2006, AMC Straight-6 petrol engine initially used a flathead design before being upgraded to an overhead valve design in 1956. A new I6 design with a short stroke and seven main bearing crankshaft was introduced in 1964. The engine was rugged, reliable, and became noted for longevity. A turbocharged racing engine based on the AMC Straight-6 engine block produced 875 hp (652 kW) and competed in the 1978 Indianapolis 500 race. The final application for the AMC Straight-6 engine was the 2006 Jeep Wrangler (TJ), after which a V6 replaced it.

The 1962 through 1973, Jeep Tornado overhead camshaft straight-six engine was introduced in the Willys Jeep Station Wagon. At the time of its introduction, the Tornado engine had the lowest specific fuel consumption of an American gasoline (petrol) engine. The Tornado engine was replaced by the AMC I6 engine.

In 2001, General Motors resumed production of straight-six engines with the Vortec 4200 dual overhead camshaft petrol engine. This engine was used in various SUV models until 2009. Also, the Duramax Straight-6 turbocharged diesel engine has been available in several General Motors SUV and light truck models since 2020.

On March 25, 2022, Stellantis announced their new twin-turbocharged straight-six engine, the Stellantis Hurricane engine. The 3.0 L Hurricane is produced at Stellantis' Saltillo Engine Plant in Mexico. Two versions are available, based on power and torque output. The Standard Output (SO) at 420 hp (313 kW; 426 PS) and 268 lb⋅ft (363 N⋅m) of torque, and the High Output (HO) at variously at 510–550 hp (380–410 kW; 517–558 PS) and 500–531 lb⋅ft (678–720 N⋅m) of torque, depending on model and model year. The turbos on the SO variant deliver a peak boost of 22 psi, while the HO turbos deliver 26 psi of peak boost.

=== Asia ===
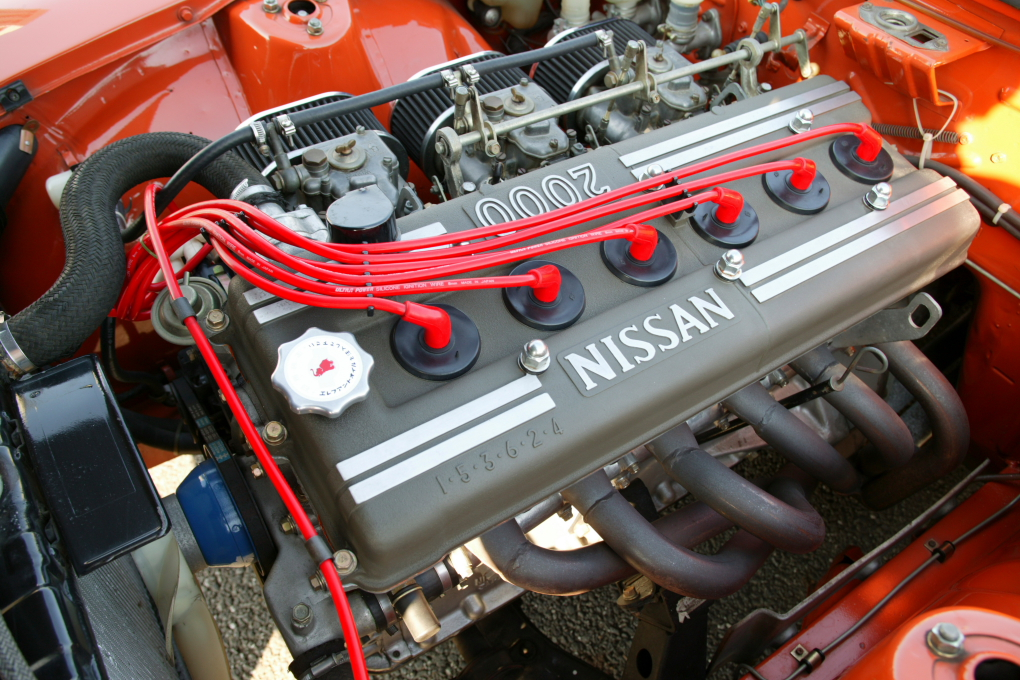
1970s Nissan S20 engine

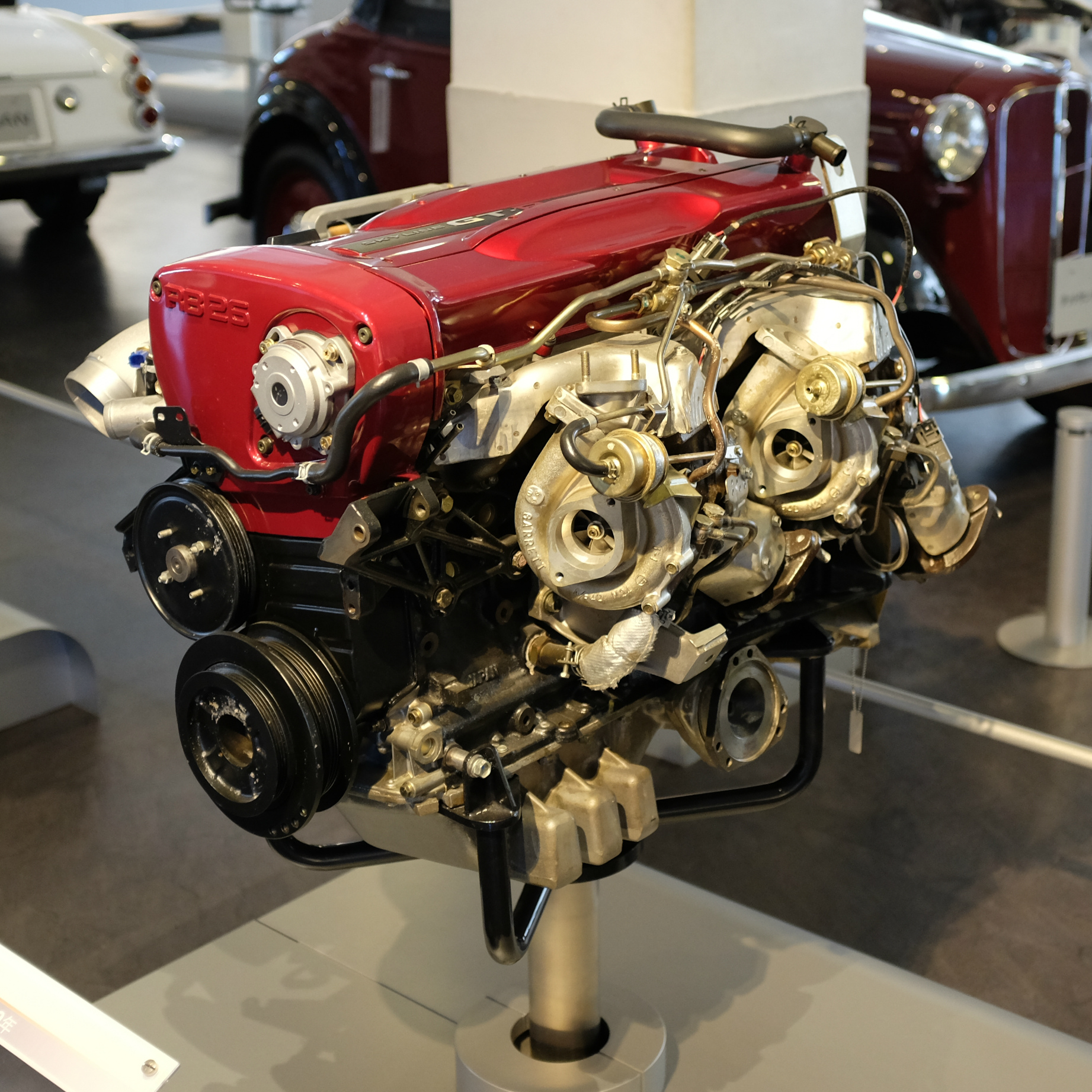
1990s Nissan RB engine

Toyota's first straight-six engine was the Toyota Type A, produced from 1935 through 1947. The Type A was an overhead-valve petrol engine based on the Chevrolet Stovebolt engine. This was followed by the first generation Toyota F overhead valve engine, which was produced from 1949 to 1975, which in turn was followed by the 2F version from 1975 to 1988 and the fuel-injected 3F / 3FE version from 1988 to 1992. This was replaced by the dual overhead camshaft Toyota FZ engine, produced from 1993 until 2008. Produced alongside these engines was the single overhead camshaft Toyota M engine, which was introduced in 1965 and produced over seven generations until 1993 (with the 7M-GTE being the final version of the M engine). The M engine was replaced by the dual overhead camshaft Toyota JZ engine, arguably known as the company's best straight-six engine, which was produced from 1990 to 2007. Toyota's third line of straight-six engines was the 2.0 L Toyota G engine, which was released as a single overhead camshaft engine in 1979 and upgraded to dual overhead camshafts before production ended in 2008 (with the 1G-FE being the final variant).

Nissan's first straight-six engine was the 1950–1952 Nissan NAK flathead petrol engine, which continued in various forms until production of the Nissan P engine ended in 2003. The 1963–1965 Nissan K overhead valve petrol engine was used in the Nissan Cedric Special 50 luxury car. Using a similar design, the Nissan H30 engine was used in several luxury cars from 1965 through 1989. In 1966, Nissan began production of the six-cylinder versions of the single overhead camshaft Nissan L engine, which was used in the Datsun (Nissan) 240Z/260Z/280Z and other Nissan/Datsun cars, and was produced until 2009. The 1985–2004 Nissan RB engine, used in the Nissan Skyline and several other cars, was produced in single overhead camshaft and dual overhead camshaft configurations until a V6 engine replaced it. The Nissan TB overhead valve engine was introduced in 1987 and produced alongside the other straight-six engines.

The six-cylinder versions of the Prince G engine were introduced in 1963 and remained in production until 1969, three years after Prince's merger with Nissan. The 1969–1973 Nissan S20 dual overhead camshaft engine (used in the Nissan Fairlady and first generation of the Nissan Skyline GT-R) was based on the Prince G engine.

Mitsubishi produced six-cylinder versions of the Mitsubishi KE engine from 1963 to 1970, as well as the rare six-cylinder versions of the Mitsubishi 6G34 version of the single overhead camshaft "Saturn" engine from 1970 to 1976.

The 2000–2006 Daewoo Magnus (also called the Chevrolet Evanda, Chevrolet Epica, Holden Epica, or Suzuki Verona) was powered by the Daewoo XK6 straight-six petrol engine, which is one of the few straight-six engines to be used in a transverse engine front-wheel drive car.

=== Australia ===
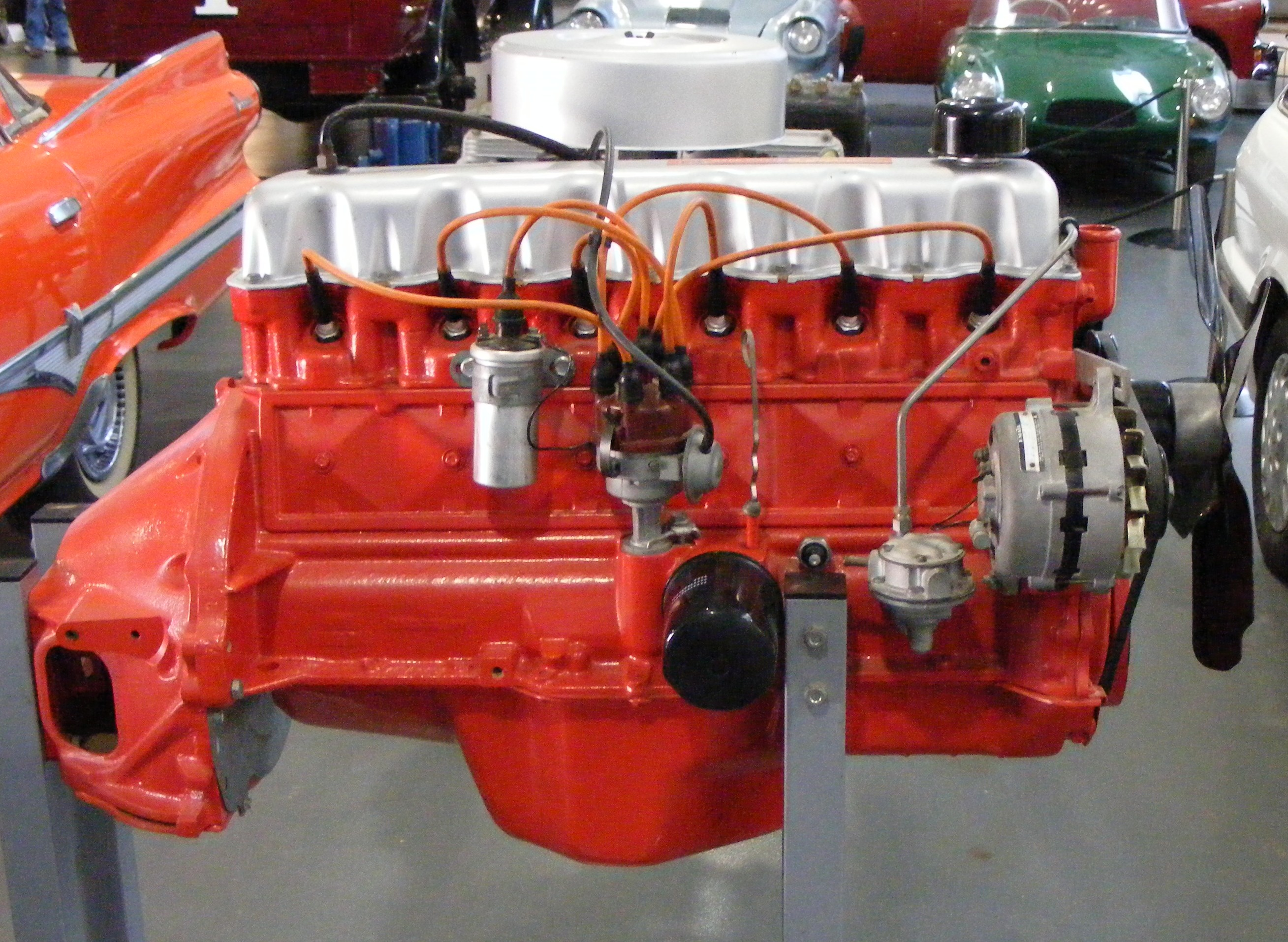
1970 Chrysler Hemi-6 Engine

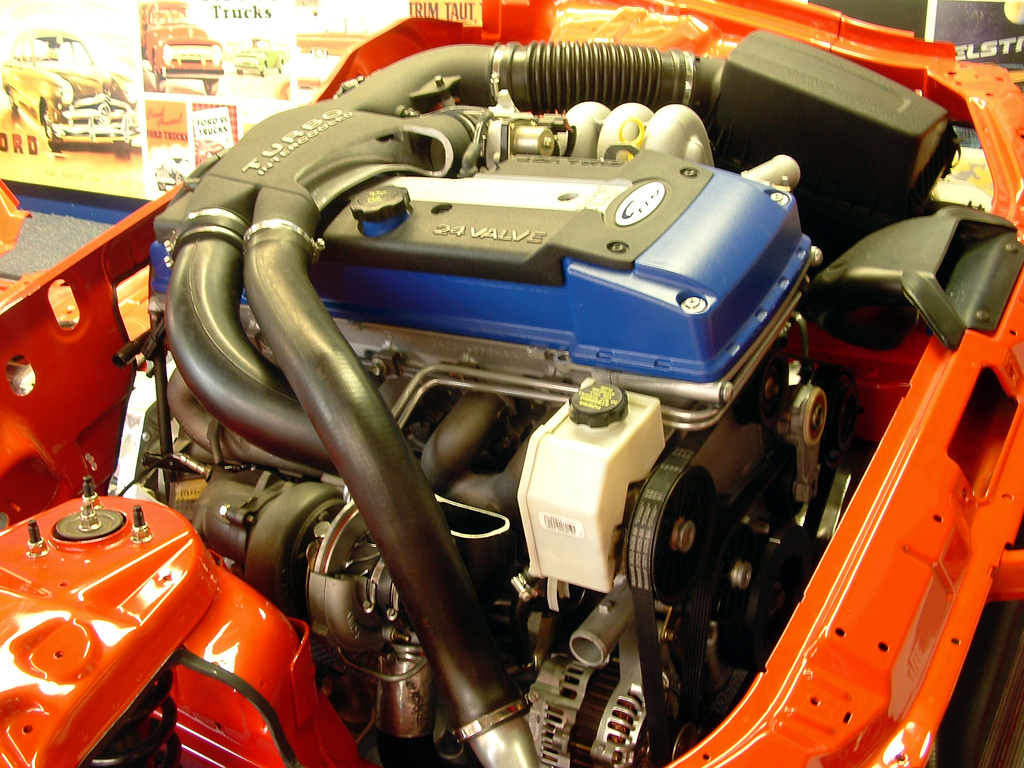
2004–2009 Ford Barra engine

From the 1950s to the 2010s, many cars produced in Australia were powered by a straight-six engine.

Holden's first car, the 1948 Holden 48-215 sedan, was powered by the Holden 'grey' motor, an overhead valve petrol engine. This engine was replaced by the Holden 'red' motor, which was produced from 1963 to 1980 and in turn followed by the 1980–1984 Holden 'blue' motor. The final locally produced Holden straight-six was the 1984–1986 Holden 'black' motor, which was initially replaced by the Japanese-built Nissan RB30 engine before Holden switched to a locally-built V6 engine.

Ford produced straight-six engines for the longest time of any Australian manufacturer. In 1960, the Ford Falcon large sedan was introduced with a locally-built version of the American Ford Straight-6 overhead valve engine. In 1988, these engines were upgraded to a single overhead camshaft design. This was followed in 2002 by the Ford Barra dual overhead camshaft engine in 2002, which was produced in both naturally aspirated and turbocharged versions. The Ford Barra engine remained in use until Ford Australia ceased local production in 2016.

The Chrysler Valiant was introduced in 1962, powered by the American Chrysler Slant-6. In 1970, the Valiant switched to the Chrysler Hemi-6 overhead valve engine, an Australia-only engine that was produced until Chrysler Australia ceased production of large cars in 1981.

The 1962–1965 Austin Freeway and Wolseley 24/80 large sedans were powered by BMC Australia's Blue Streak overhead valve petrol engine. This was followed by the six-cylinder versions of the BMC E-series overhead camshaft engines, which were introduced in the 1970 Austin Kimberley / Austin Tasman front-wheel-drive sedans, which were produced until 1972. This engine was upsized to a 2.6 L displacement in 1973 and used Leyland P76 and the Morris Marina large cars until 1975.

== Usage in motorcycles ==
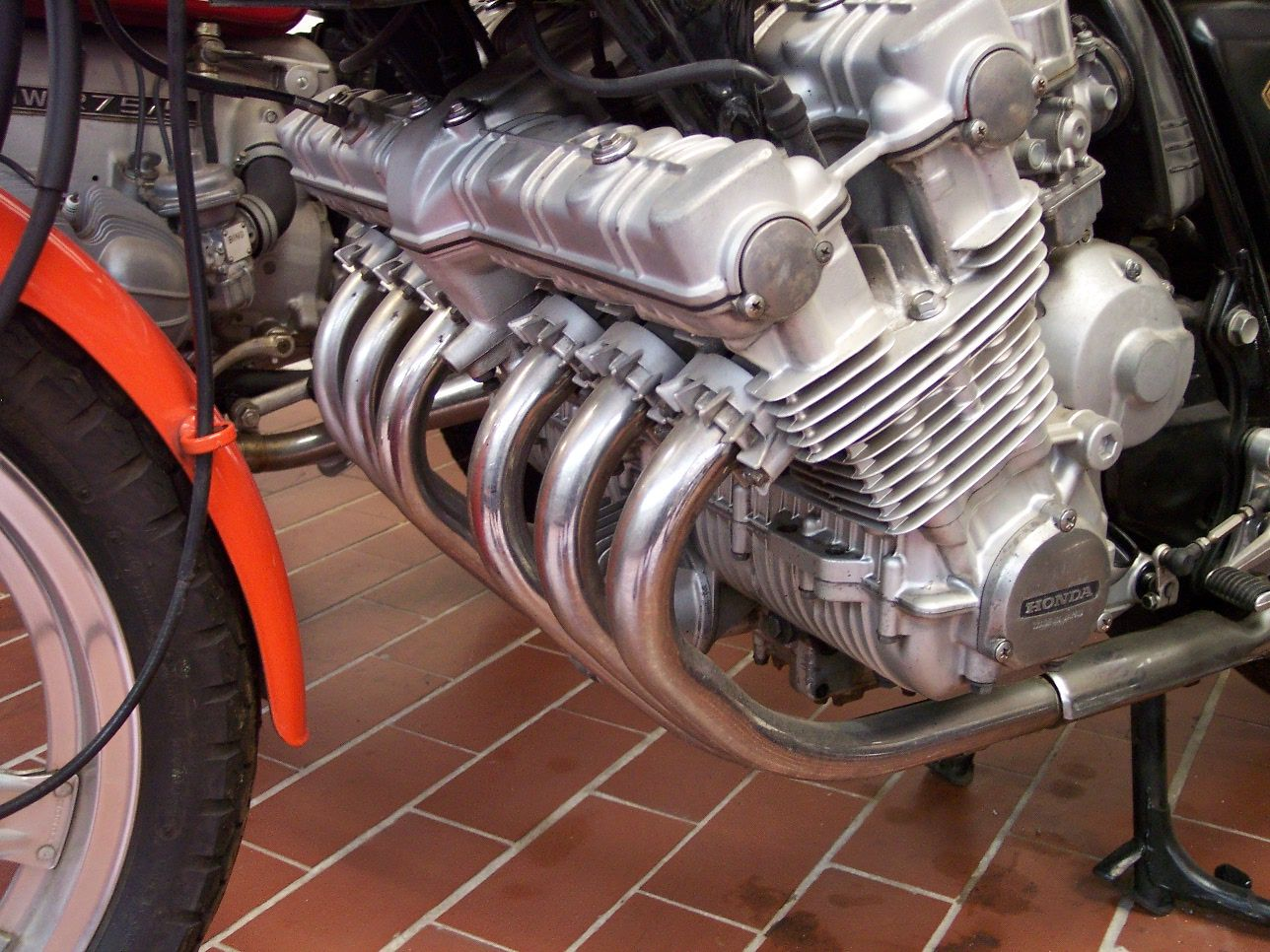
1978–1982 Honda CBX engine

From 1964 to 1967, Honda produced several Grand Prix motorcycle racing motorcycles powered by straight-six versions of the Honda RC petrol racing engine; these versions were designated the '3RC164', 'RC165', 'RC166' and Honda RC174. The unrelated road-use Honda CBX was produced from 1978 to 1982 and was powered by a 1,047 cc (63.9 cu in) dual overhead camshaft petrol engine.

The 1973–1989 Benelli Sei series was the first road-use motorcycle to use a straight-six engine. Initially released with a 747 cc (45.6 cu in) single overhead camshaft petrol engine, in 1979 it was upgraded to a 906 cc (55.3 cu in) engine.

The 1979–1989 Kawasaki Z1300 roadster motorcycle was powered by a 1,286 cc (78.5 cu in) dual overhead camshaft petrol engine.

From 2011–present, the BMW K1600 series of touring motorcycles have been powered by a 1,649 cc (100.6 cu in) dual overhead camshaft petrol engine.

== Usage in trucks ==
Straight-six engines used in trucks include:

- 5.9 and 6.7 L versions of the 1984–present Cummins B Series turbocharged diesel engine
- General Motors' 2002–2009 Vortec 4200 naturally-aspirated petrol engine

== Diesel engines ==
=== Automotive engines ===
Straight-six engines used in automobiles include:

- 1978–1995 Volkswagen D24 naturally-aspirated engine and the 1982–1992 Volkswagen D24T turbocharged engine
- 1986–1997 Mercedes-Benz OM603 engine – produced in naturally aspirated and turbocharged variants
- BMW's line of diesel engines consists of the BMW M21 (introduced in 1981) through to the current BMW B57 engine
- 1985–2009 Nissan RD (naturally-aspirated and turbocharged variants) and 1987–2007 Nissan TD42 (turbocharged) engines
- General Motors offers the Duramax I6 engine for light duty pickup trucks.

=== Industrial-use and truck engines ===
- various Toyota engines from 1956–present
- Caterpillar manufactures several inline six-cylinder diesel engines, known for their reliability and use in various industrial and commercial applications. These engines include the C13, C7, 3126, and others, ranging in size and power output.
- Cummins B Series (5.9 and 6.7 L versions) from 1984–present, used in Type-C and Type-D school buses, medium-duty trucks, and Ram pickup trucks
- Cummins C Series/L Series (8.3 and 8.9 L versions) used in medium-duty and heavy-duty trucks, Type-D school buses, small Class A motorhomes, and transit buses.
- Cummins X Series used in semi-trailer trucks, motorcoaches, large Class A motorhomes, and vocational trucks.
- Detroit Diesel DD13 and DD15 used in semi-trailer trucks and vocational trucks.
- Volvo D13 used in semi-trailer trucks, vocational trucks, motorcoaches, and large Class A motorhomes.
- industrial and truck engines from International, MAN Truck & Bus, Scania and Yuchai
- A V12 engine is a twelve-cylinder piston engine where two six cylinder banks are arranged in a V configuration around a common crankshaft.

== See also ==
- Flat-six engine
- V6 engine
- VR6 engine
- V12 engine
