= Oldsmobile Series 40 =

Car model

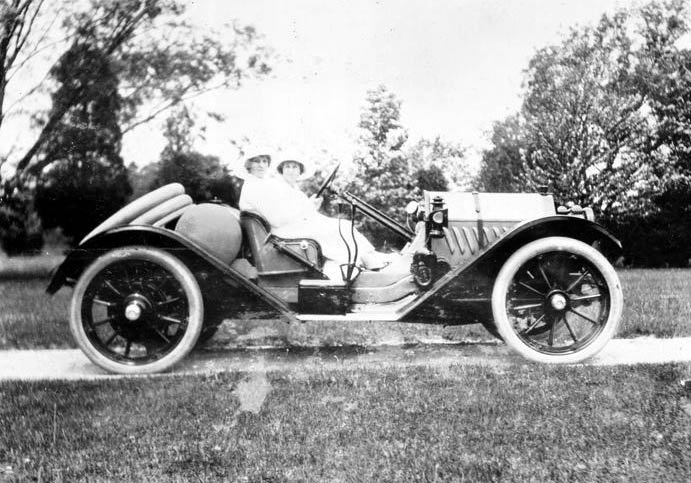

Overview
- Manufacturer: General Motors
- Production: 1912–1913
- Assembly: United States: Lansing, Michigan (Lansing Car Assembly)

Chronology
- Predecessor: Model S
- Successor: Model 42

The Series 40 Defender was a four-seat passenger car produced by General Motors for its Oldsmobile division in 1912 and 1913, and was manufactured at Lansing Car Assembly in Lansing, Michigan. It continued to be the entry-level model for Oldsmobile, while Oakland Motor Car Company remained GM's entry level brand as Chevrolet didn't join GM until 1917. The Series 40 was the base model of three platforms sharing a platform with the Buick Model 10, with the mid-range Series 28 Autocrat, and the top level Series 23 Limited.

== History ==
The Series 40 Defender was equipped with a side-valve, in-line 267 cu in (4,375 cc) four-cylinder engine developing 35 bhp. The engine was installed in the front, driving the rear wheels through a transmission shaft. The gearbox had four forward gears, with the gearshift lever positioned to the right of the driver.

The brake pedal came into contact with the Drum brake on the rear wheels. The Series 40 had a wheelbase of 116 in (2,946 mm) and was offered as a 5 passenger touring car, 4-door landaulet or 4-door sedan. The previously offered 2-door roadster returned only for 1912.

It used semi-elliptic leaf springs attached to a solid front axle, while using three-quarter-elliptic leaf springs on a solid rear axle.

325 Series 40 were manufactured in 1912, and 1000 were built in 1913. It replaced the Model S and it was replaced by the Model 42 in 1913.

== See also ==
- Cadillac Model Thirty
- Buick Model 10
- Oakland Four
