= Oldsmobile Model 42 =

Car model

Overview
- Manufacturer: General Motors
- Production: 1914
- Model years: 1914
- Assembly: United States: Lansing, Michigan (Lansing Car Assembly)

Chronology
- Predecessor: Oldsmobile Curved Dash
- Successor: Model 43

The Model 42 was an entry-level four seat passenger car produced by GM's Oldsmobile Division in 1914. It was offered as a replacement to the Oldsmobile Curved Dash runabout when it was discontinued in 1908, and was the junior platform to the Oldsmobile Six introduced in 1913. GM had acquired Elmore Manufacturing Company, Oldsmobile and Oakland Motor Car Company in 1908 and Cartercar and Rainier Motor Car Company in 1909 as their entry-level models, and Oldsmobile products were being repositioned in their new hierarchy as GM began to consolidate operations after William Durant had left.

It was replaced by the Model 43 and shared a platform with the Buick Model 10. The Oldsmobile Model R Curved Dash competed with the Chevrolet Series F while Chevrolet was still independent from GM, and in 1908 the Ford Model T was also introduced. It was also known as the "Baby Olds" as it was smaller than the mid-level Oldsmobile Autocrat Series 28 and the top level Oldsmobile Limited Series 23.

== History ==
The Model 42 was equipped with a side-valve, in-line 193 cu in (3,156 cc) four-cylinder engine developing 20 bhp. The engine was installed in the front, driving the rear wheels through a transmission shaft. The gearbox had three forward gears, with the gearshift lever positioned to the right of the driver.

As with other Oldsmobiles of the time, the brake pedal came into contact with the Drum brake on the rear wheels. The Model 42 had a wheelbase of 112 in (2,845 mm) and initially only came as a touring car for 1914, with 2 door roadster added in 1914. 500 Model 42 were manufactured in 1914, and 1,319 were built in 1915 before it was replaced by the Model 43 in 1915. The retail price of the Model 42 started at US$1,350 ($43,393 in 2025 dollars) for a 5-passenger touring sedan.

== See also ==
- Cadillac Type 51
- Chevrolet Series FA
- Oldsmobile Light Eight
- Buick Six
- Oakland Four
