= Oldsmobile Model M =

Car model

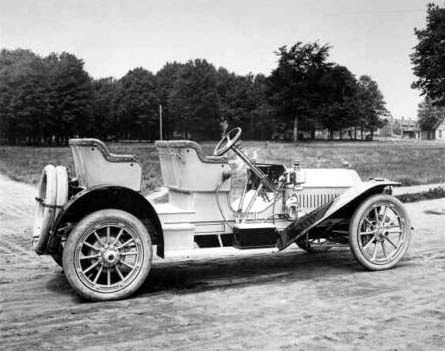

Overview
- Manufacturer: Oldsmobile
- Production: 1908
- Model years: 1908
- Assembly: United States: Lansing, Michigan (Lansing Car Assembly)

Chronology
- Predecessor: Oldsmobile Model A
- Successor: Oldsmobile Model X

The Model M was a four-seat passenger car produced by Oldsmobile in 1908, offered as a mid-range alternative to the Model R Curved Dash runabout that appeared in 1901, replacing the Model A. It was the junior sedan to the first six-cylinder sedan called the Oldsmobile Model Z also introduced in 1908, but was larger than the Oldsmobile Model X.

== History ==
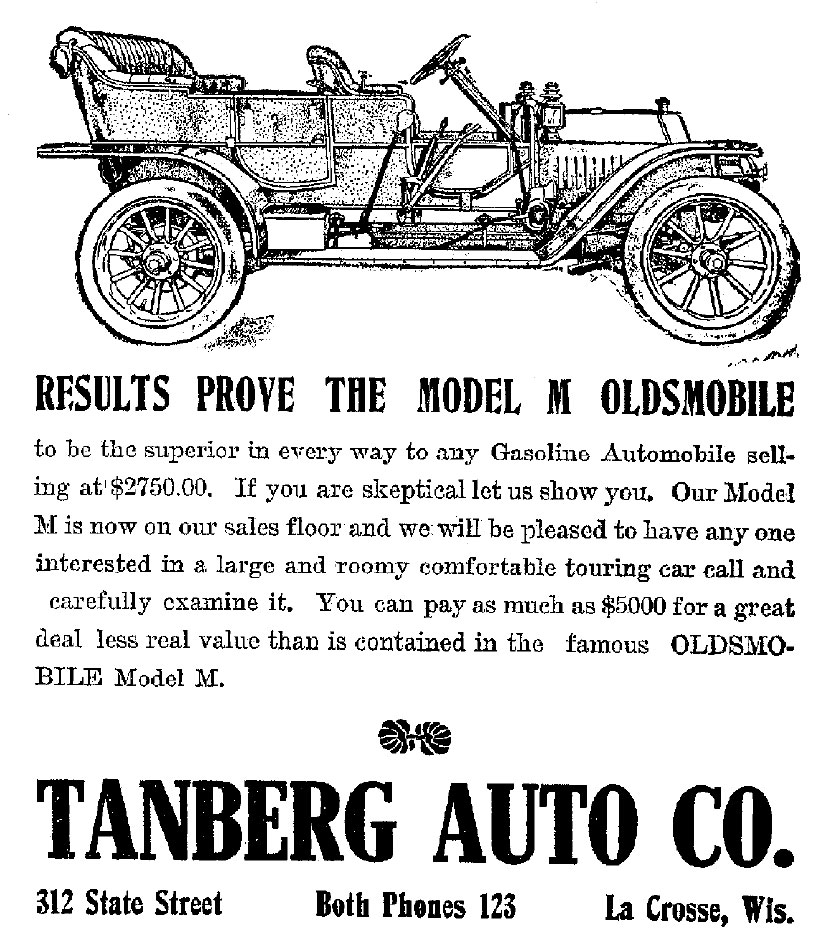
Oldsmobile Model M ad

The Model M was equipped with a side-valve, in-line 336 cu in (5,506 cc) four-cylinder engine developing 36 bhp. The engine was installed in the front, driving the rear wheels through a transmission shaft. The gearbox had three forward gears, with the gearshift lever positioned to the right of the driver. The limousine body style was replaced with the touring sedan which was more popular, while the retail price remained at US$2,750 ($95,022 in 2025 dollars) It was entered in the Glidden Reliability Tour and won the competition.

The brake pedal engaged drum brakes on the rear wheels. The Model M had a wheelbase of 112 in (2,845 mm) and was offered as a five-passenger touring car or 4-door sedan. The previously offered 2-door Model H Flying Roadster was now given its own designation called the Model MR.

1,000 Model M were manufactured in 1908. It was replaced by the Model D in 1909; the roadster derivative was called the Model DR.
