= Oldsmobile Model X =

Car model

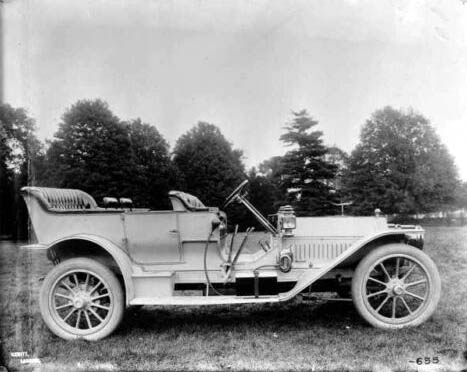

Overview
- Manufacturer: Oldsmobile
- Production: 1908
- Model years: 1908
- Assembly: United States: Lansing, Michigan (Lansing Car Assembly)

Chronology
- Predecessor: Oldsmobile Model M
- Successor: Oldsmobile Model Z

The Model X was a four-seat passenger car produced by Oldsmobile in 1908, offered as an entry-level alternative to the Model D that appeared in 1901, replacing the Model M. It was the junior companion to the first six-cylinder sedan called the Oldsmobile Model Z also introduced in 1908, and shared most of its technology with the Model M.

== History ==
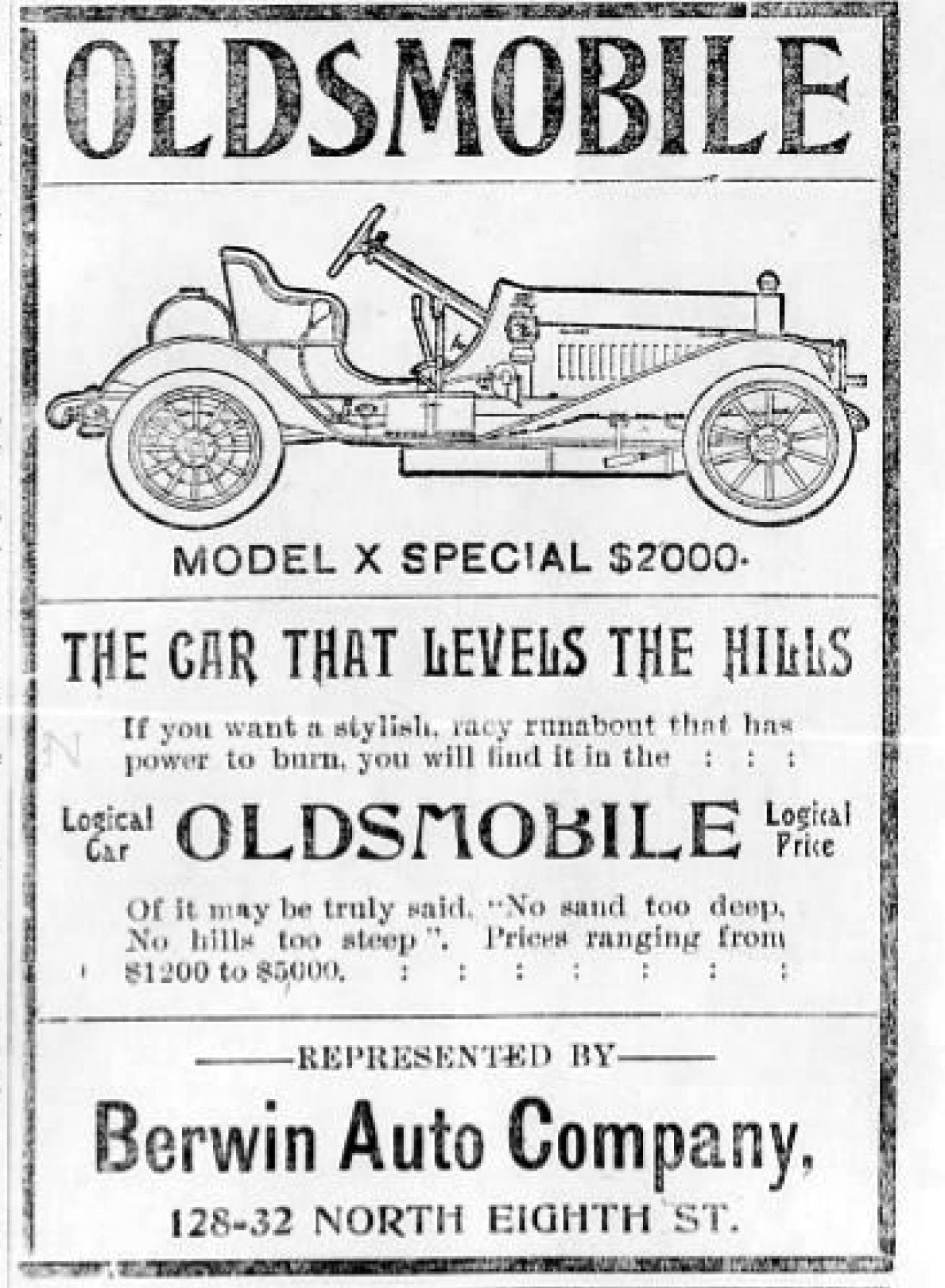
Oldsmobile Model X ad

The Model X was equipped with a side-valve, in-line 302 cu in (4,949 cc) four-cylinder engine developing 32 bhp. The engine was installed in the front, driving the rear wheels through a transmission shaft. The gearbox had three forward gears, with the gearshift lever positioned to the right of the driver.

The brake pedal engaged drum brakes on the rear wheels. The Model X had a wheelbase of 106 in (2,692 mm) and was offered as a 5-passenger touring car or 2-door roadster, and the advertised price of the roadster was $2,000 ($71,667 in 2025 dollars).

1,100 of the cars were manufactured in 1908; it was cancelled without replacement.
