= Kidder (steam automobile company) =

Defunct American motor vehicle manufacturer

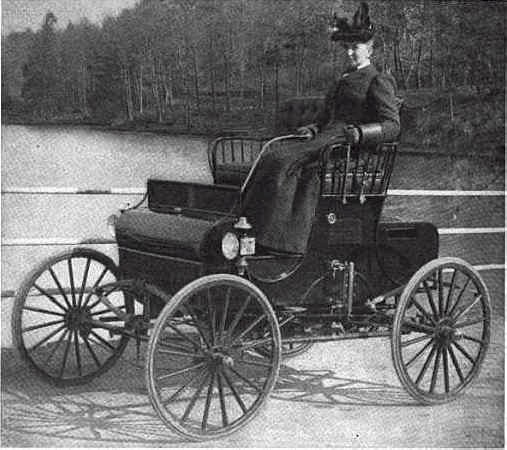
1901 Kidder Steam Runabout

Kidder Motor Vehicle Company was a veteran era automobile manufacturer started in 1899 in New Haven, Connecticut.

== History ==
Inventor Wellington P. Kidder experimented with steam cars and established the Kidder Motor Vehicle Company in New Haven to produce them.

Kidder Model 2 was a $1,000 runabout and Model B was a $1,600 delivery wagon. The twin cylinders of its motor were placed on each side of the boiler at the back of the vehicle with direct drive to the rear axle.

In 1903 the company voted to discontinue its corporate existence.

== See also ==
Steam Automobile

Kidder Motor Vehicle Co
