= Oldsmobile Model D =

Car model

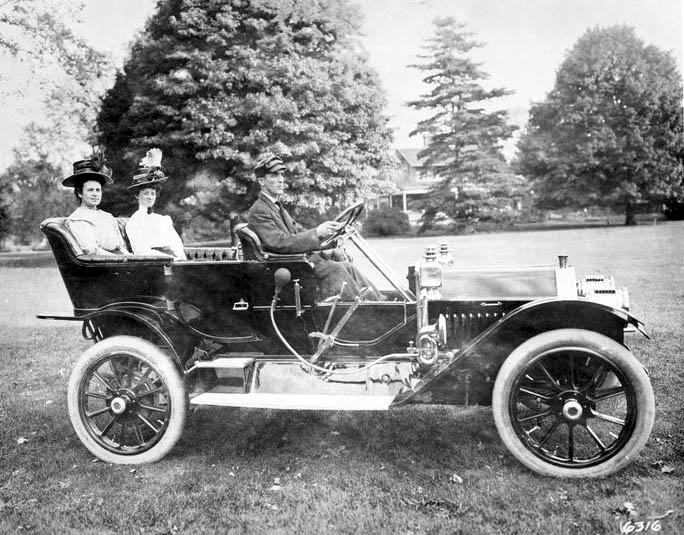

Overview
- Manufacturer: General Motors
- Production: 1909
- Model years: 1909
- Assembly: United States: Lansing, Michigan (Lansing Car Assembly)

Chronology
- Predecessor: Oldsmobile Model M

The Model D was a four-seat passenger car produced by General Motors under the Oldsmobile brand in 1909, replacing the Model M. It was the last car engineered by Oldsmobile before it became a division of GM and began sharing a platform with Buick.

== History ==
The Model D was equipped with a side-valve, in-line 336 cu in (5,506 cc) four-cylinder engine developing 40 bhp. The engine was installed in the front, driving the rear wheels through a transmission shaft. The gearbox had three forward gears, with the gearshift lever positioned to the right of the driver.

The brake pedal came into contact with the drum brake on the rear wheels. The Model D had a wheelbase of 112 in (2,845 mm) and was offered as a 5 passenger touring car, 4-door landaulet or 4-door sedan, with a retail price of US$4,000 ($143,333 in 2025 dollars) for the Landaulet, while the Cadillac Model D was sold for US$2,800. The previously offered 2-door roadster was now given its own designation called the Model DR.

1,000 Model D were manufactured in 1908, and it was replaced by the Series 22 in 1910, and the roadster was called the Series 25.
