= Oldsmobile Model S =

Car model

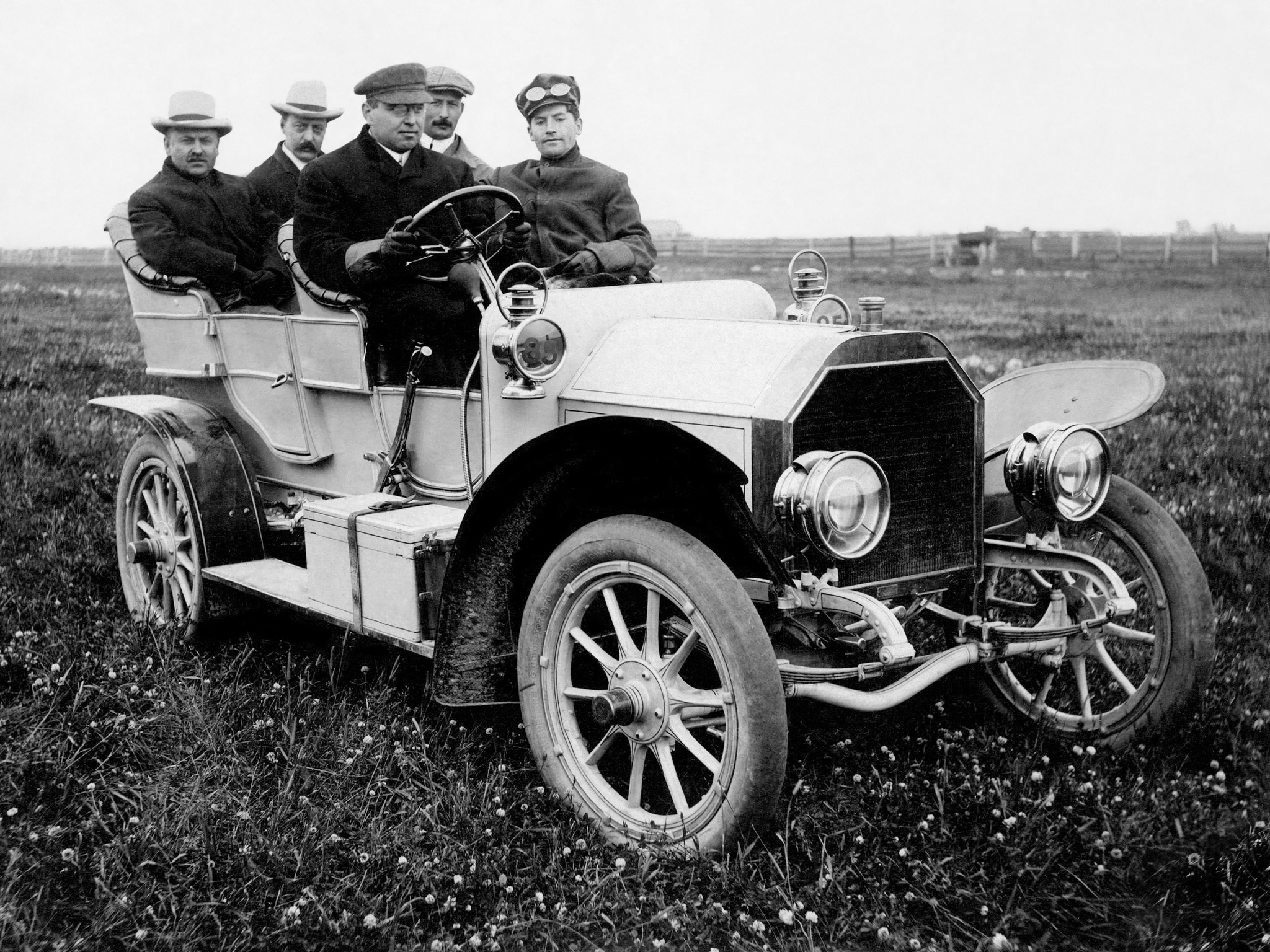

Overview
- Manufacturer: Oldsmobile
- Production: 1906
- Model years: 1906
- Assembly: United States: Lansing, Michigan (Lansing Car Assembly)

Chronology
- Predecessor: Oldsmobile Curved Dash
- Successor: Oldsmobile Model A

The Model S was the first four-seat passenger car produced by Oldsmobile in 1906, offered as a larger alternative to the Model R Curved Dash runabout that appeared in 1901. The advertised price was $2,250 ($80,625 in 2025 dollars). It was Oldsmobile's first four cylinder car and took the top level marketing position above the Model L and the entry-level Model R. It was one of the last independently developed products before they joined General Motors in 1908, and competed against Buick, Ford and other automakers at the time. It was built at the Oldsmobile factory in Detroit and developed by Frederick and Angus Smith, whose father Samuel L. Smith was the primary investor, and R. E. Olds had left the company due to an argument with Oldsmobile Board of Directors.

== History ==
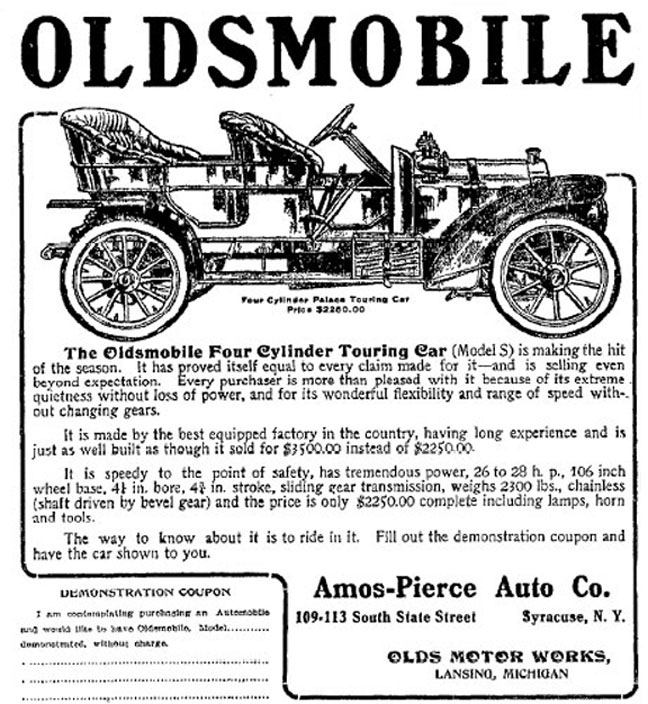
Oldsmobile Model S (listing the advertised price at $2,250)

The Model S was equipped with a side-valve, in-line 270 cu in (4,417 cc) four-cylinder engine developing 28 bhp. The engine was installed in the front, driving the rear wheels through a transmission shaft. The gearbox had three forward gears, with the gearshift lever positioned to the right of the driver. The brake pedal came into contact with the drum brake on the rear wheels.

The Model S had a wheelbase of 106 in (2,692 mm) and came in three body styles, to include a 2- or 3-passenger "Gentleman's Roadster" with a rumble seat and the 5 passenger "Palace Touring" car. Uniquely, one retail price of US$2,250 was charged for each body style, while the Buick Four was US$900 ($32,250 in 2025 dollars).

1,400 Model S were manufactured in 1906, and it was replaced by the Model A in 1907.
