= Oldsmobile Model A =

Car model

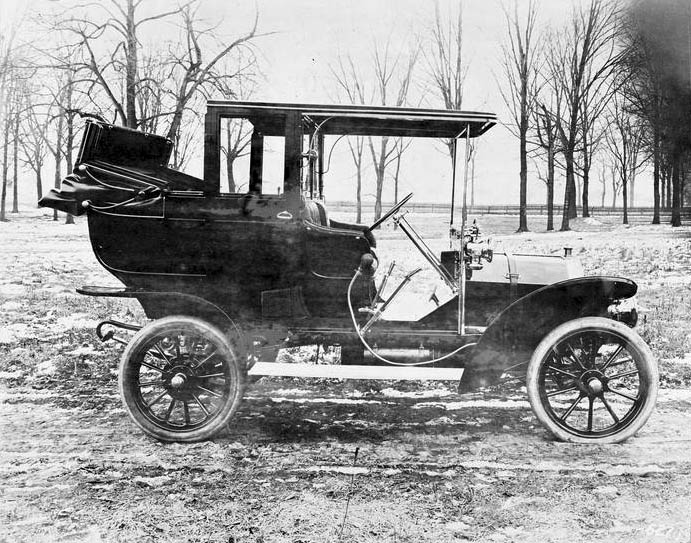
- 1907 Oldsmobile Model AH Landaulet

Overview
- Manufacturer: Oldsmobile
- Production: 1907
- Model years: 1907
- Assembly: United States: Lansing, Michigan (Lansing Car Assembly)

Chronology
- Predecessor: Oldsmobile Model S
- Successor: Oldsmobile Model M

The Oldsmobile Model A was a five-seater passenger car manufactured by Oldsmobile for 1907, replacing the Model S and succeeded by the Model M.

The car had a water-cooled inline four-cylinder four-stroke engine installed at the front, which drew an output of 35 to 40 bhp (26 to 29 kW) from a displacement of 302 cu in (4,948 cc).

The engine power was transmitted to the rear wheels via a three-speed gearbox with a gearshift lever on the outside right. The brake pedal worked on the driveshaft, and the handbrake lever on the drum brakes on the rear wheels. Bodystyles offered were a 4-door touring car or a 4-door sedan. The touring car was available in gray, red and Brewster green, while the sedans were available in dark green or black, while either body style had a retail price of US$2,750 ($95,022 in 2025 dollars). The standard items available with a full set of tools, two acetylene headlights, two additional oil lamps, a speaking tube for communicating with the driver, perfumery bottles, ashtray and silk trim for the passenger compartment

The Model A shared much of its mechanicals and chassis with the Model H "Flying Roadster" also listed at US$2,750, available in either red or French gray.
