= Oldsmobile Model Z =

Car model

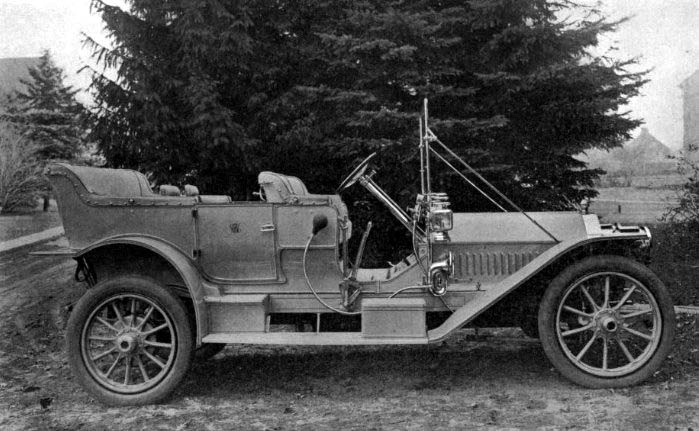

Overview
- Manufacturer: General Motors
- Assembly: United States: Lansing, Michigan (Lansing Car Assembly)

Chronology
- Predecessor: Oldsmobile Model X
- Successor: Oldsmobile Series 20

The Oldsmobile Model Z was the company's first top-level passenger car produced under the Oldsmobile brand before they became a division of General Motors in 1908. The Model Z was created and engineered after Mr. Olds left the company but before they became a division, the same year the car was introduced. It was the senior model to the mid-level Oldsmobile Model M, and the entry-level, Buick engineered Oldsmobile Model 20. It was upgraded to become the Oldsmobile Limited.

== History ==
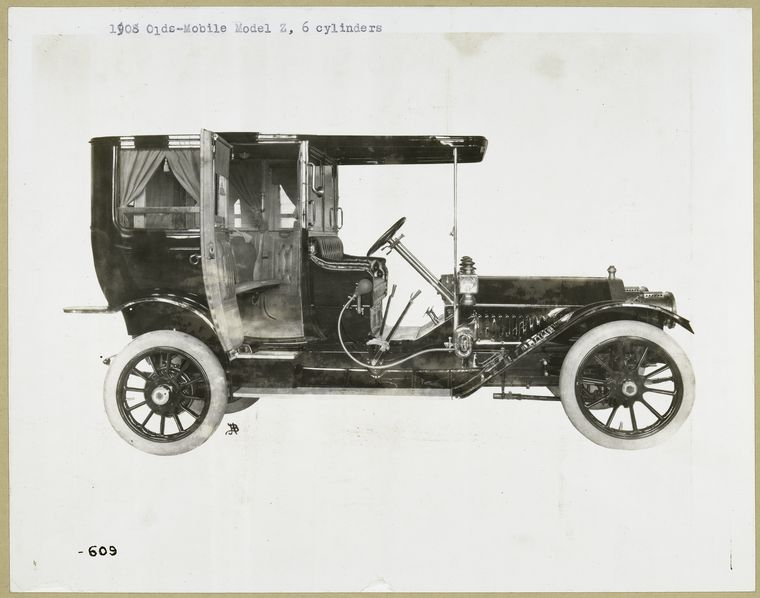
1909 Oldsmobile Model Z Town Car

The Model Z was the first Oldsmobile to introduce a flathead engine with six cylinders, displacing 453 cu in (7,423 cc) developing 48 bhp. The engine was installed in the front, driving the rear wheels through a transmission shaft. The gearbox had three forward gears, with the gearshift lever positioned to the right of the driver. As with other Oldsmobiles of the time, the brake pedal came into contact with the drum brake on the rear wheels.

For 1909 the engine displacement was increased to 505 cu in (8,275 cc) and a 2-door roadster was introduced. Sales were modest, selling 200 for the entire series. It was first introduced at Madison Square Garden and had a retail price of US$4,000 ($143,333 in 2025 dollars), priced considerably higher than the Buick Model 10 at US$1,000.
