= Oldsmobile Curved Dash =

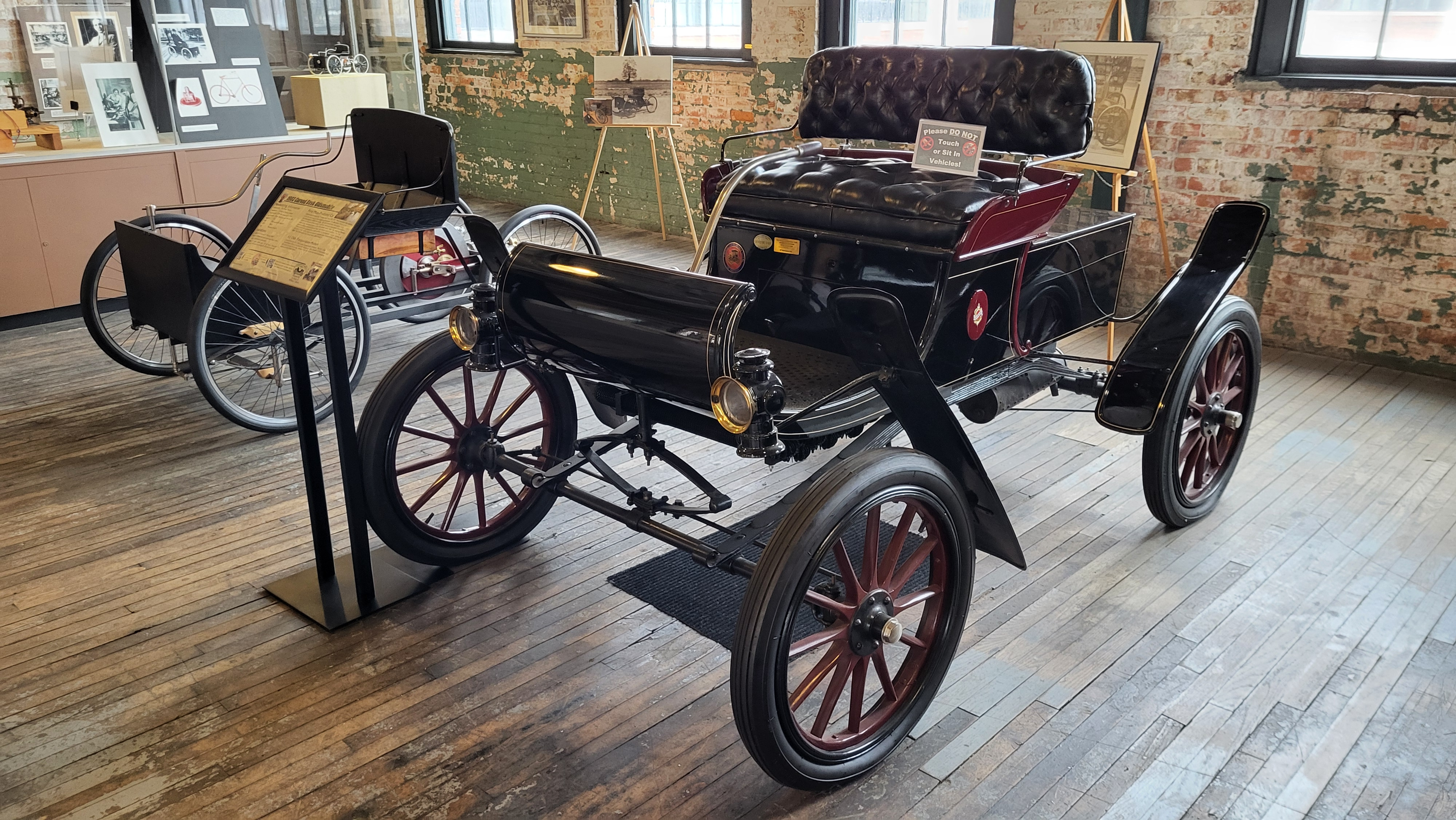
- Oldsmobile Model R Curved Dash Runabout 1903

Overview
- Manufacturer: Oldsmobile
- Also called: Model 6C; Model B Model F Model R
- Production: 1901–1907 > 19,000 built
- Assembly: United States: Lansing, Michigan (Lansing Car Assembly)

Body and chassis
- Class: Entry-level car
- Body style: Runabout
- Layout: Mid-engine

Powertrain
- Engine: 95 cu in (1,560 cc) horizontal one-cylinder
- Transmission: Planetary 2-speed

Chronology
- Successor: Oldsmobile Series 40

The gasoline-powered Oldsmobile Model R, also known as the Curved Dash Oldsmobile, is credited as being the first mass-produced automobile, meaning that it was built on an assembly line using interchangeable parts. It was introduced by the Oldsmobile company in 1901 and produced through 1907; 425 were produced the first year, 2,500 in 1902, and over 19,000 were built in all. When General Motors assumed operations from Ransom E. Olds on November 12, 1908, GM introduced the Oldsmobile Model 20, which was the 1908 Buick Model 10 with a stretched wheelbase and minor exterior changes.

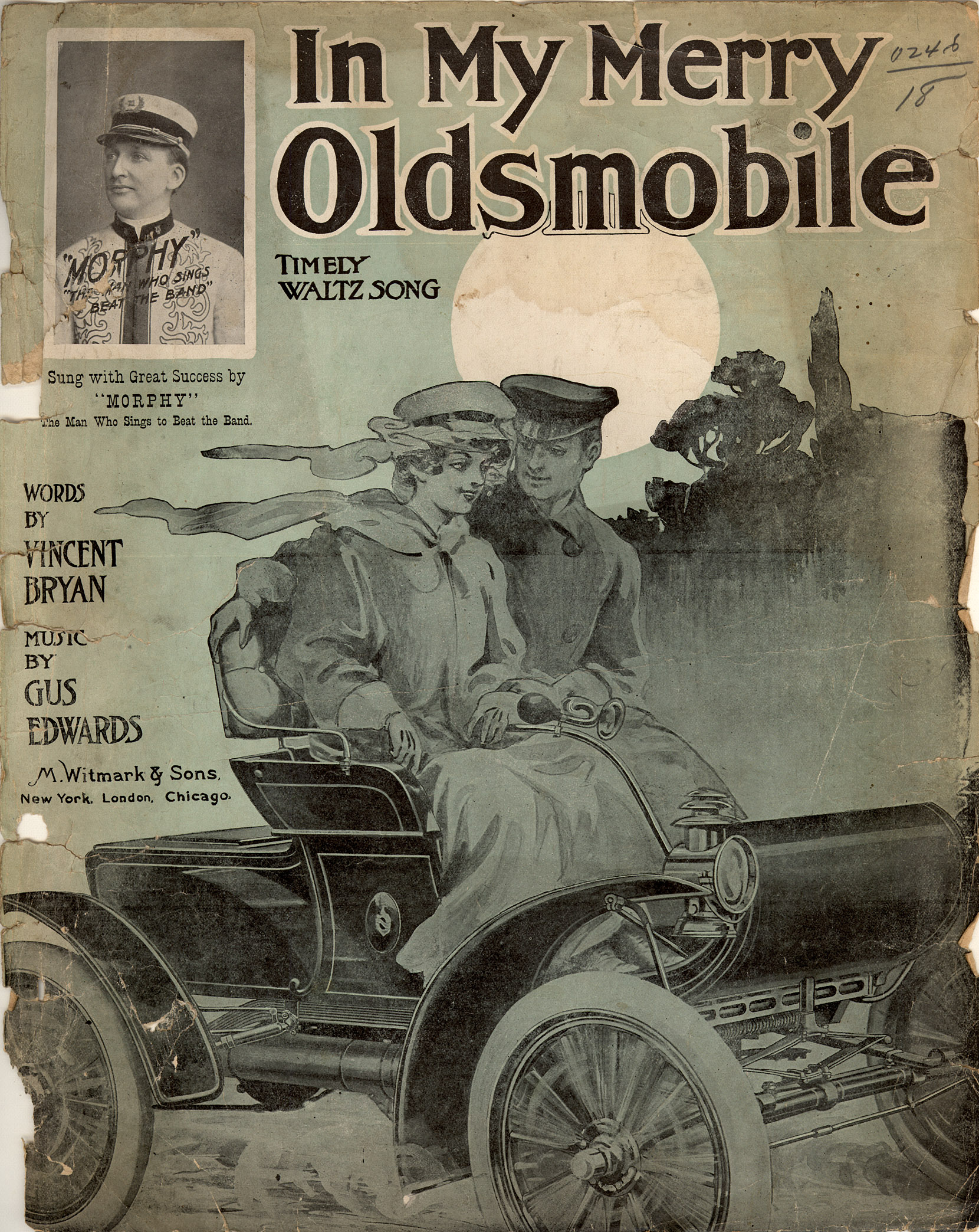
"In My Merry Oldsmobile" sheet music featuring an Oldsmobile Curved Dash automobile

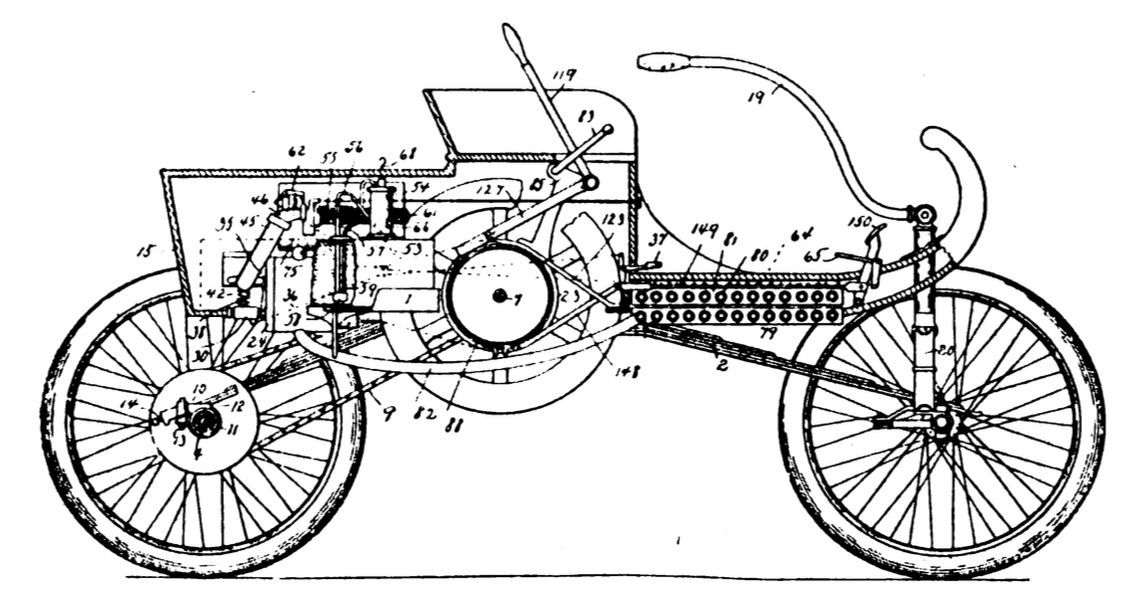
Oldsmobile Curved Dash (1902)

== Features and price ==
It was a runabout model, could seat two passengers, and sold for US$650 (equivalent to $25,000 in 2025). While competitive, due to high volume, and priced below the US$850 two-seat Ford Model C "Doctor's Car", it was more expensive than the Western 1905 Gale Model A roadster at $500, the Black at $375, and the Success at $250. It was built as a city car for short distance driving, while the larger Model S could carry four passengers and could travel longer distances.

The flat-mounted, water-cooled, single-cylinder 1,560 cc (95 cu in) engine, situated at the center of the car, produced 5 hp (3.7 kW), relying on a brass gravity feed carburetor. The transmission was a semiautomatic design with two forward speeds and one reverse. The low-speed forward and reverse gear system is a planetary type (epicyclic). The car weighed 850 lb (390 kg) and used Concord springs. It had a top speed of 20 mph (32 km/h).

The car's success was partially by accident. In 1901, a fire started in a building with several prototype autos. Workers attempted to move the prototypes out of the burning building but were successful at rescuing only one prototype, the Model R Curved Dash. The fire destroyed the other prototypes before they could be approved for production, leaving the Curved Dash as the only one intact.

== Models ==
In 1904, the Model R was replaced by the Model 6C, which had a larger 1,931 cc (118 cu in) engine; in addition, drum brakes replaced the band brake. After 2,234 copies, the 6C model was discontinued in December 1904.

In 1905, the Model B was introduced with more improvements. The engine received improved cooling and a new flywheel, and the handbrake now worked on the differential instead of the gearbox. The leaf spring suspension was modified so that the reinforced axles were connected to all spring elements. In 1906, the car received celluloid side window curtains. The dashboard was also offered with an upright position, called the Straight Dash, and approximately 6,500 Model B were manufactured, and the Model F was introduced in 1907, again with mechanical improvements.

The Model B also saw a limited production Touring Sedan with a novel entry approach called the Side Entrance Touring Sedan where passengers would enter from the middle of the car. The engine was a 4,257 cc (260 cu in) two-cylinder horizontally opposed engine installed underneath the passenger compartment that powered the rear wheels, and the transmission was a two-speed planetary gearbox. Sales were not successful and it was cancelled by 1906.

=== Oldsmobile Pirate Beach Racer ===
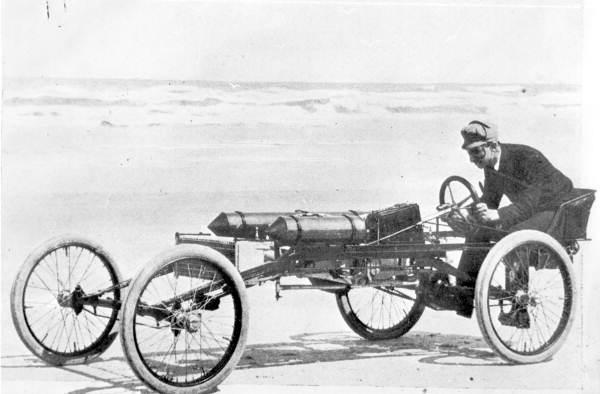
Olds in the Pirate Racer at Ormond Beach, Florida.

In 1902, Mr. Olds modified a Model R and essentially stripped it down to an engine, a single seat, and a radiator, and connected the solid front and rear axles on semi-elliptic leaf springs, which then supported the engine, transmission and passenger. He raced it at Florida's Ormond Beach in 1902 and 1903, where his driver Horace Thomas drove the Pirate to a record speed of 54.38 mph.

== Gallery ==
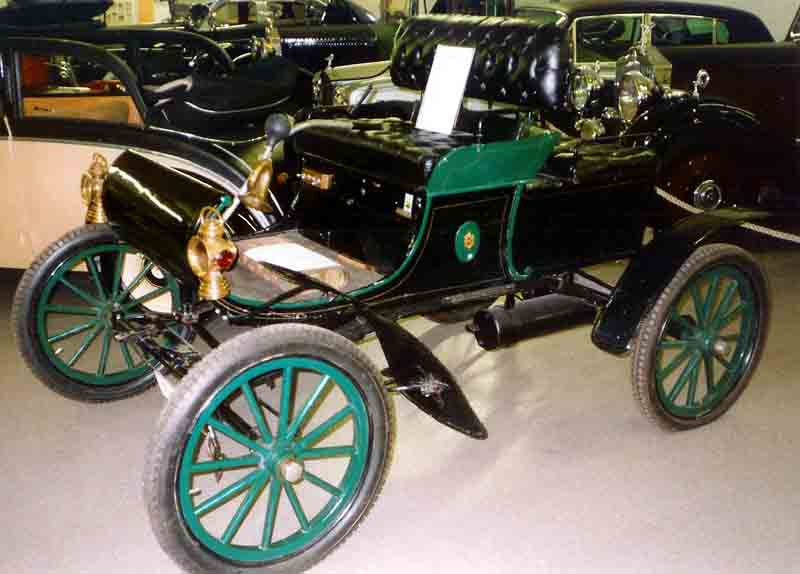
1903 Model R Runabout

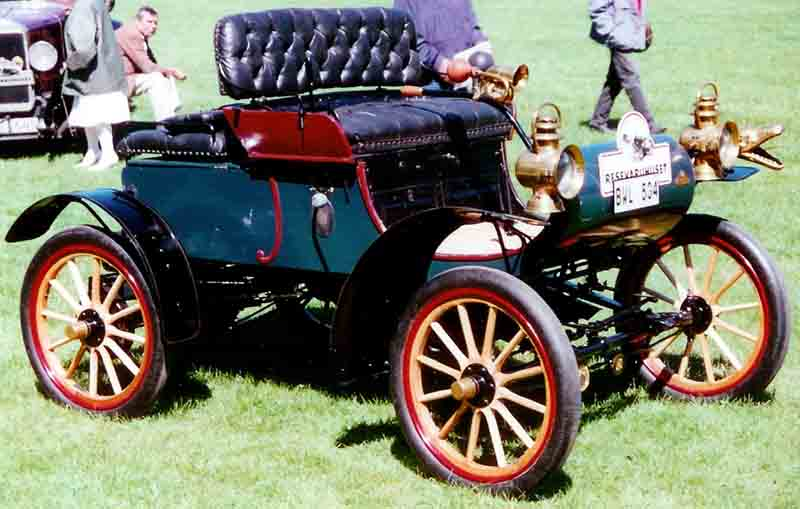
1904 Model 6C Runabout

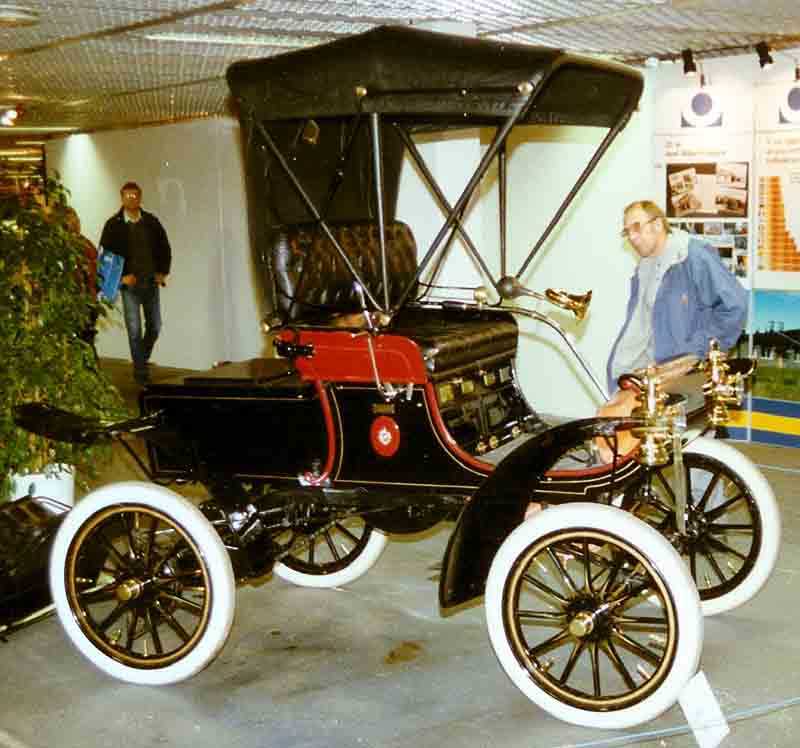
1904 Model 6C Runabout with top up

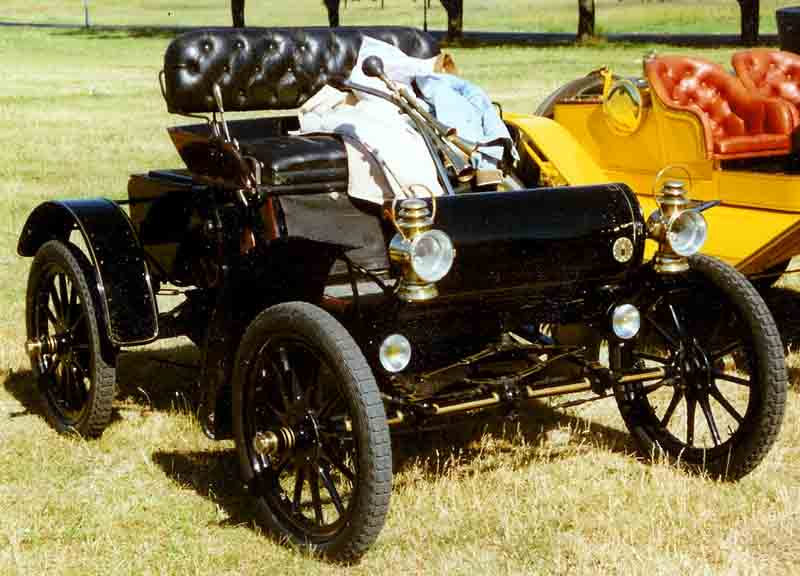
1905 Model B Runabout

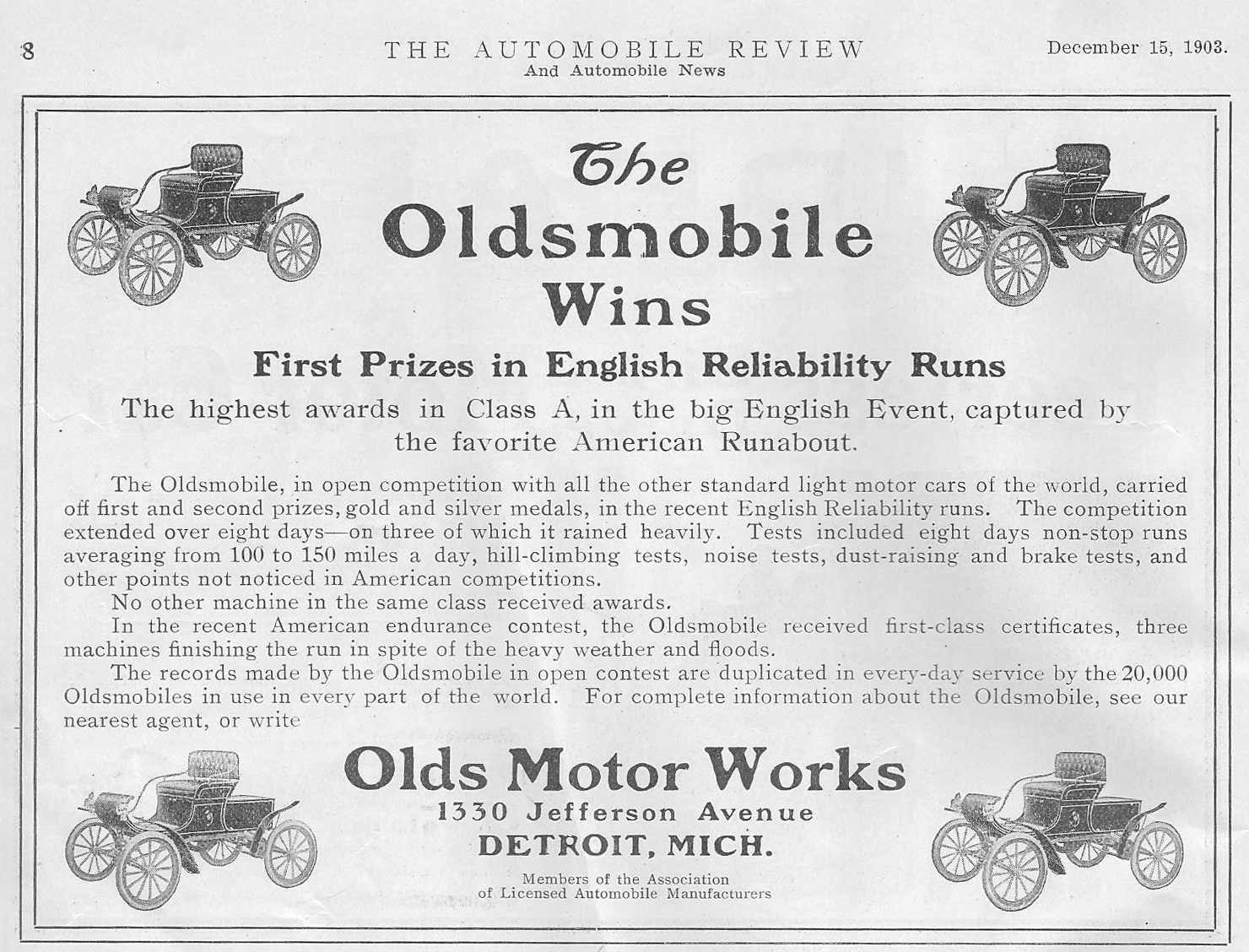
1903 advertisement

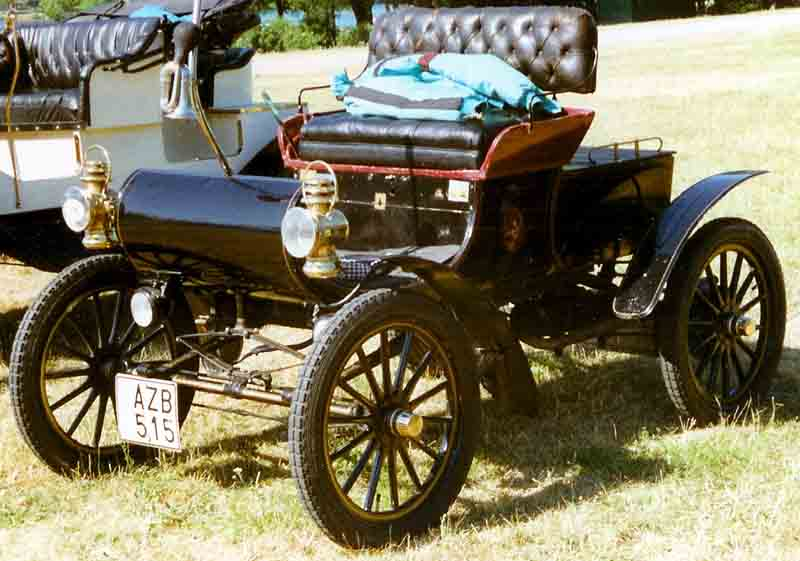
1903 Model R Runabout

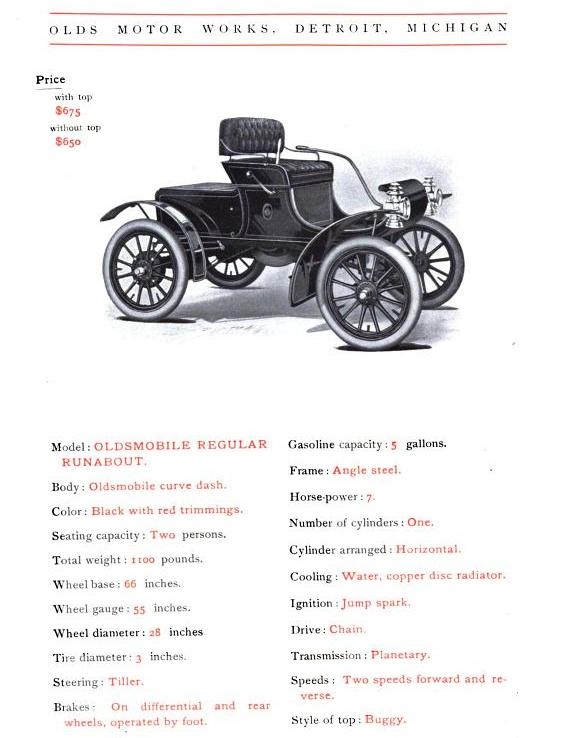
1905 Curved Dash

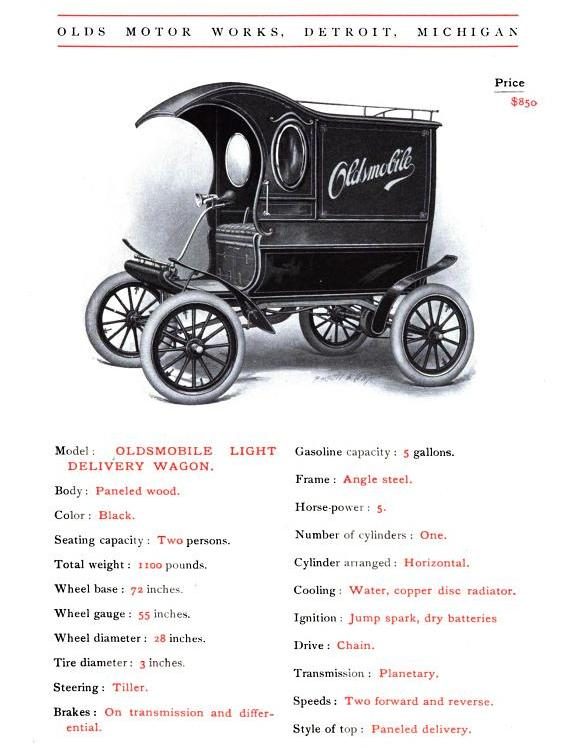
1905 Curved Dash Delivery Wagon
