= Oldsmobile Limited =

Car model

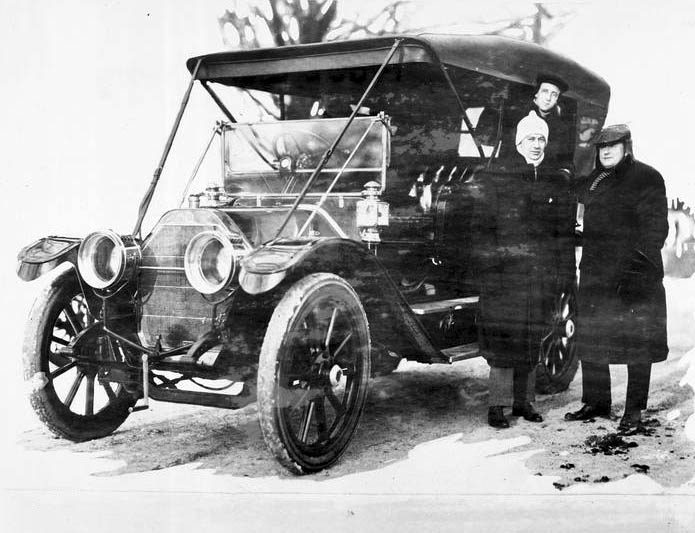

Overview
- Manufacturer: General Motors
- Production: 1910–1912
- Model years: 1910–1912
- Assembly: United States: Lansing, Michigan (Lansing Car Assembly)

Chronology
- Predecessor: Oldsmobile Model Z

The Oldsmobile Limited was a top-level passenger car produced by GM's Oldsmobile Division in 1910, offered as an upgraded replacement to the Oldsmobile Model Z when it was discontinued in 1909. The Oldsmobile Limited was very large and expensive in comparison to vehicles offered by competitors, and was manufactured in Lansing, Michigan. It was the senior model to the mid-level Oldsmobile Autocrat of which it shared much of its technology while the Autocrat was smaller, and was replaced by the Oldsmobile Light Eight. It was also much larger than GM's lop level brand, the Cadillac Model Thirty which only had a four cylinder engine, and the Buick Model 10 which made the Limited the most expensive vehicle GM offered at the time.

== History ==
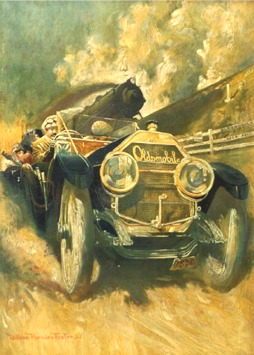
Setting the Pace, Oldsmobile Limited painting by William Harnden Foster

The Series 23 was equipped with a large six-cylinder T-head engine that displaced 505 cu in (8,275 cc) developing 60 bhp. The engine was installed in the front, driving the rear wheels through a transmission shaft. The gearbox had four forward gears, with the gearshift lever and handbrake positioned externally and to the right of the driver, who sat on the right hand side of the vehicle. Retail prices ranged from US$4,600 ($158,946 in 2025 dollars) to US$5,800 ($200,411 in 2025 dollars) for the closed body sedan which made it a competitor with the Pierce-Arrow Town Car. As with other Oldsmobiles of the time, the brake pedal came into contact with the drum brake on the rear wheels. The Series 23 or Series 24 had a wheelbase of 130–140 in (3,302–3,556 mm) and came as a touring car, 4-door sedan or 2-door roadster for 1910.

It was used in a race against the 20th Century Limited train from Albany to New York City and a painting was created depicting the race, with the car winning the race.

For 1911, the improved Series 27 engine displacement increased to 706 cu in (11,569 cc) with the same wheelbases offered and bodystyles. 1912 was the last year of production where it was called the Series 33, and the shorter wheelbase was no longer offered. More than 800 vehicles were produced between 1910 and 1912. The car was positioned as a competitor to many large European luxury marques such as Lorraine-Dietrich, Brasier, Delaunay-Belleville, Panhard & Levassor, Mercedes-Benz, Rolls-Royce, Renault, and D. Napier & Son. Sales were affected by the fact that Oldsmobile had previously also built the relatively tiny Oldsmobile Curved Dash.
