= List of Oldsmobile vehicles =

The American automobile manufacturer General Motors sold a number of vehicles under its marque Oldsmobile, which started out as an independent company in 1897 and was eventually shut down due to a lack of profitability in 2004.

== Production models ==
=== 1900–1919 ===
Image	Model	Intr.	Disc.
	Curved Dash (Note: The first automobile produced by Oldsmobile. Also called Model 6C, Model B, Model F, Model R)	1901	1907
	Model S (Note: The first four-seat passenger car by the company.)	1906	1906
	Model A	1907	1907
	Model M	1908	1908
	Model X	1908	1908
	Model Z (Note: The last car produced by the Oldsmobile company before becoming a division of General Motors.)	1908	1908
	Model D	1909	1909
	Series 20 (Note: The first branded "Oldsmobile" automobile under GM.)	1909	1909
	Limited	1910	1910
	Series 22	1910	1911
	Series 28	1911	1912
	Series 40	1912	1913
	Six (Note: Also known as the Model 53, 54 and 55.)	1913	1915
	Model 42	1914	1914
	Model 43	1915	1916
	Model 43	1921	1922
	Light Eight	1916	1923

=== 1920–1969 ===
Image	Model	Intr.	Disc.
	Model 30 (Note: continued to be known as the Oldsmobile Six.)	1923	1927
	F-Series	1928	1938
	Viking (Note: Viking was part of the GM companion make program and marketed through the Oldsmobile division.)	1929	1931
	L-Series	1932	1938
	Series 60	1939	1948
	Series 70	1939	1950
	88	1949	1999
	98	1940	1996
	Starfire	1960	1966
	Starfire	1974	1980
	Cutlass	1961	1999
	442	1964	1980
	442	1985	1987
	442	1990	1991
	Jetstar I	1964	1965
	Vista Cruiser wagon	1964	1977
	Cutlass Supreme	1966	1997
	Toronado	1966	1992
	Hurst/Olds	1968	1984

=== 1970–1989 ===
Image	Model	Intr.	Disc.
	Custom Cruiser wagon	1971	1992
	Omega	1973	1984
	Cutlass Ciera	1982	1996
	Firenza	1982	1988
	Cutlass Calais	1985	1991
	Touring Sedan	1987	1993

=== 1990–2004 ===
Image	Model	Intr.	Disc.
	Bravada (SUV)	1991	2004
	Silhouette (van)	1990	2004
	Achieva	1992	1998
	Aurora	1995	2003
	Intrigue	1998	2002
	Alero	1999	2004

== Concept vehicles ==
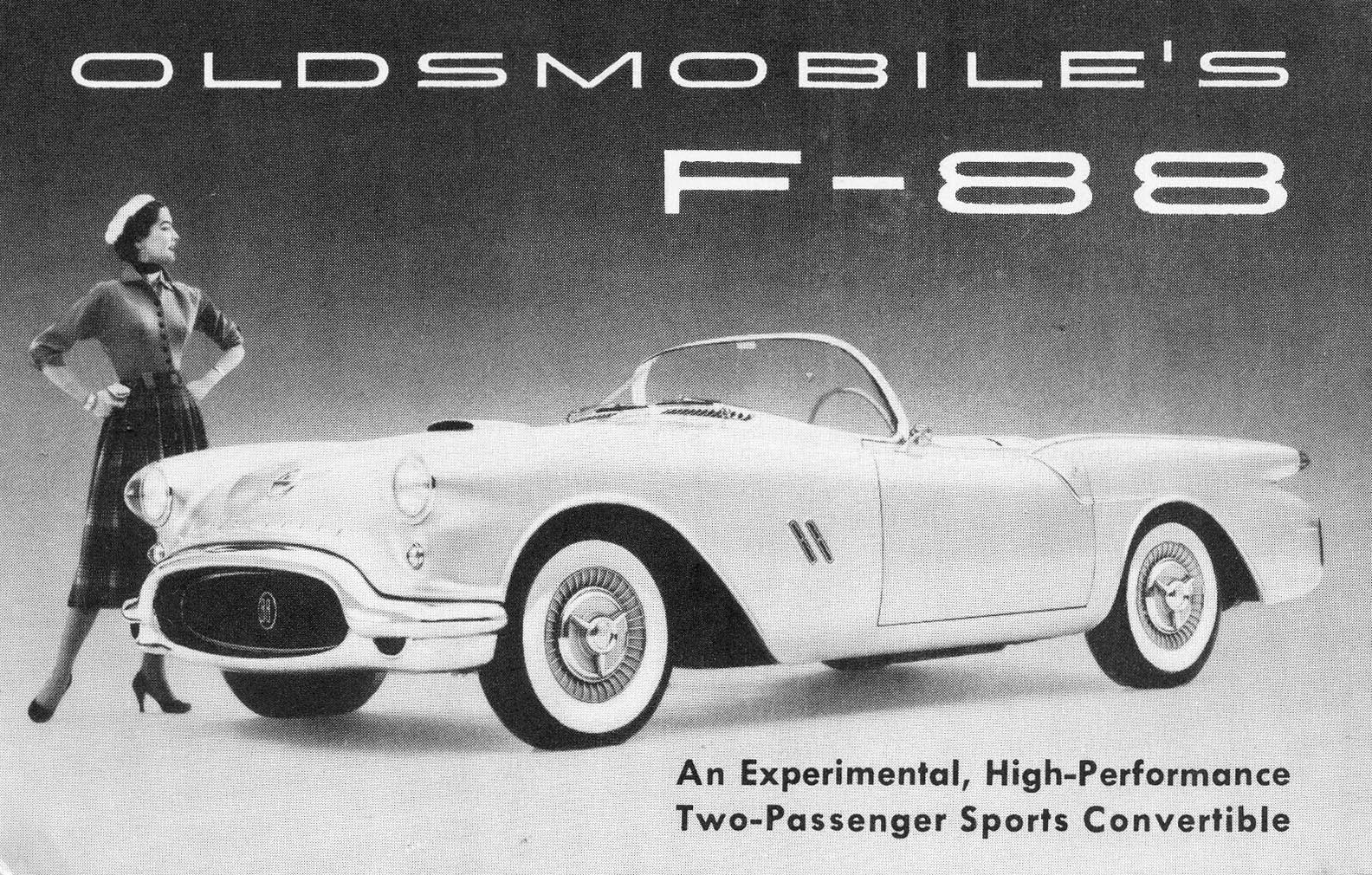
F-88

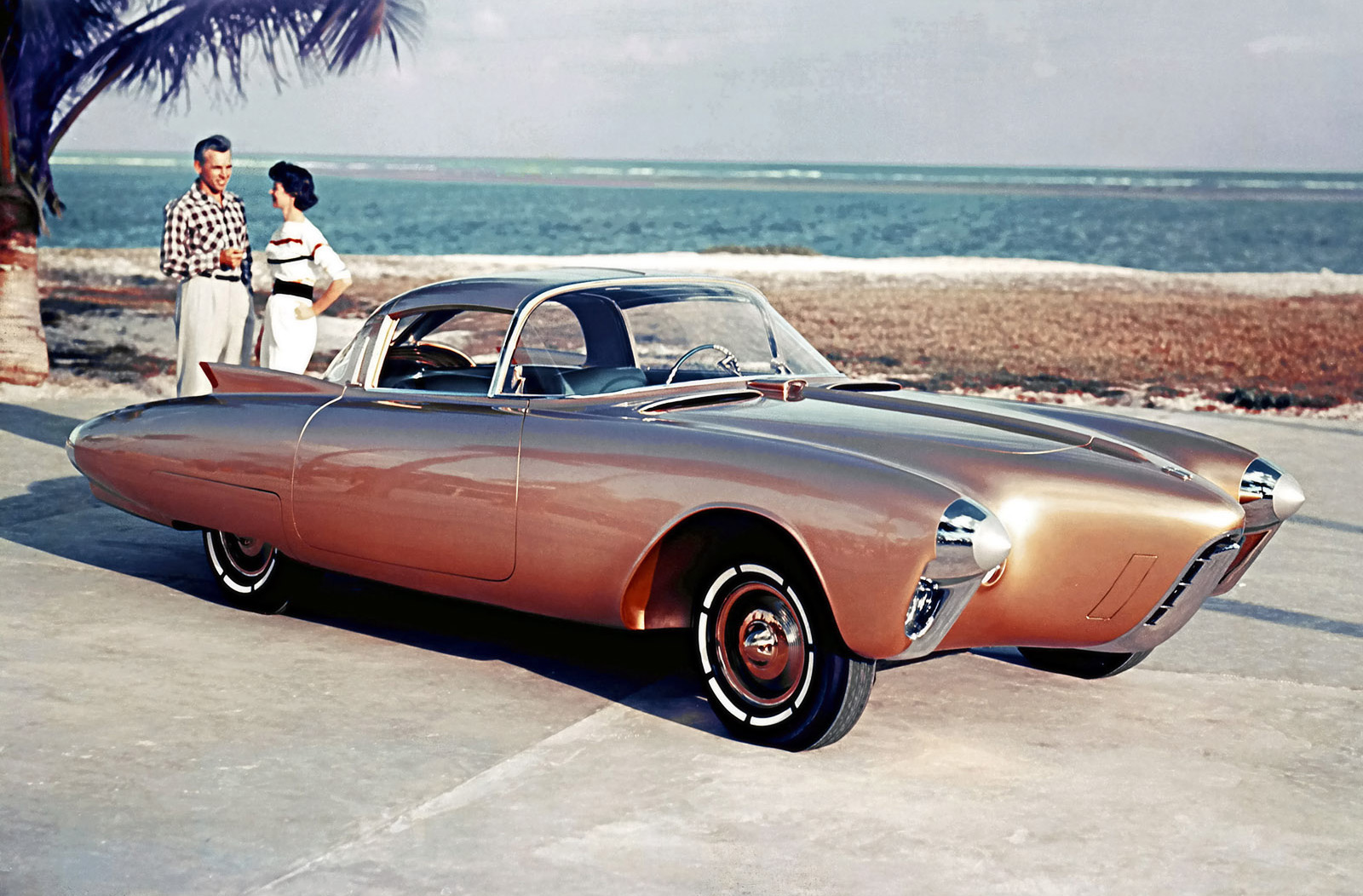
Golden Rocket

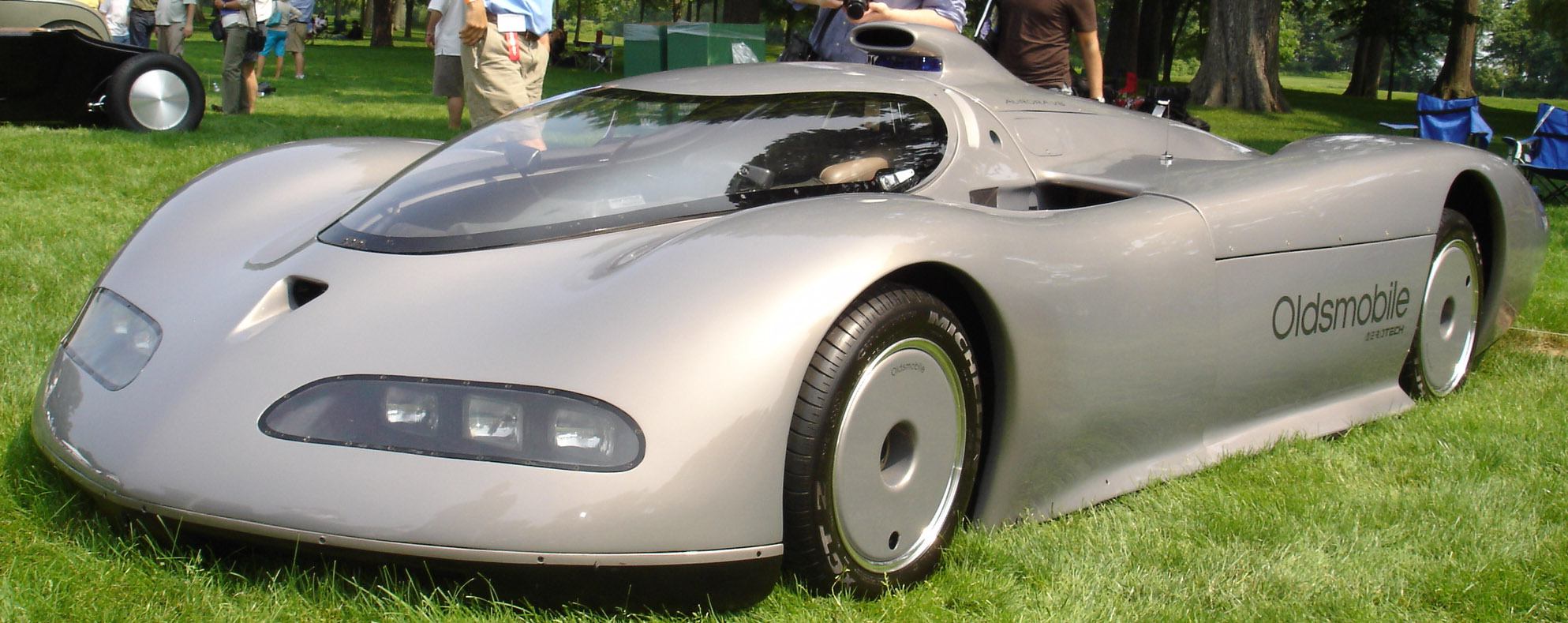
Aerotech I

- 1953 Starfire X-P Rocket
- 1954 Cutlass
- 1954 F-88
- 1955 88 Delta
- 1956 Golden Rocket
- 1957 F-88 Mark II
- 1959 F-88 Mark III
- 1962 X-215
- 1966 Toronado (Note: Originally launched as a concept car, it then came into production.)
- 1967 Thor
- 1968 XP-866
- 1970 XP-888-GT
- 1977 Mirage J-Coupe
- 1986 Incas
- 1987 Aerotech
- 1988 Aerotech II
- 1989 Aertotech III
- 1989 Tube Car
- 1990 Expression
- 1991 Achieva
- 1992 Anthem
- 1995 Antares
- 1997 Alero Alpha
- 1999 Recon
- 2000 Profile
- 2001 O4

== See also ==
- List of defunct automobile manufacturers of the United States
