= Oldsmobile Series 28 =

Car model

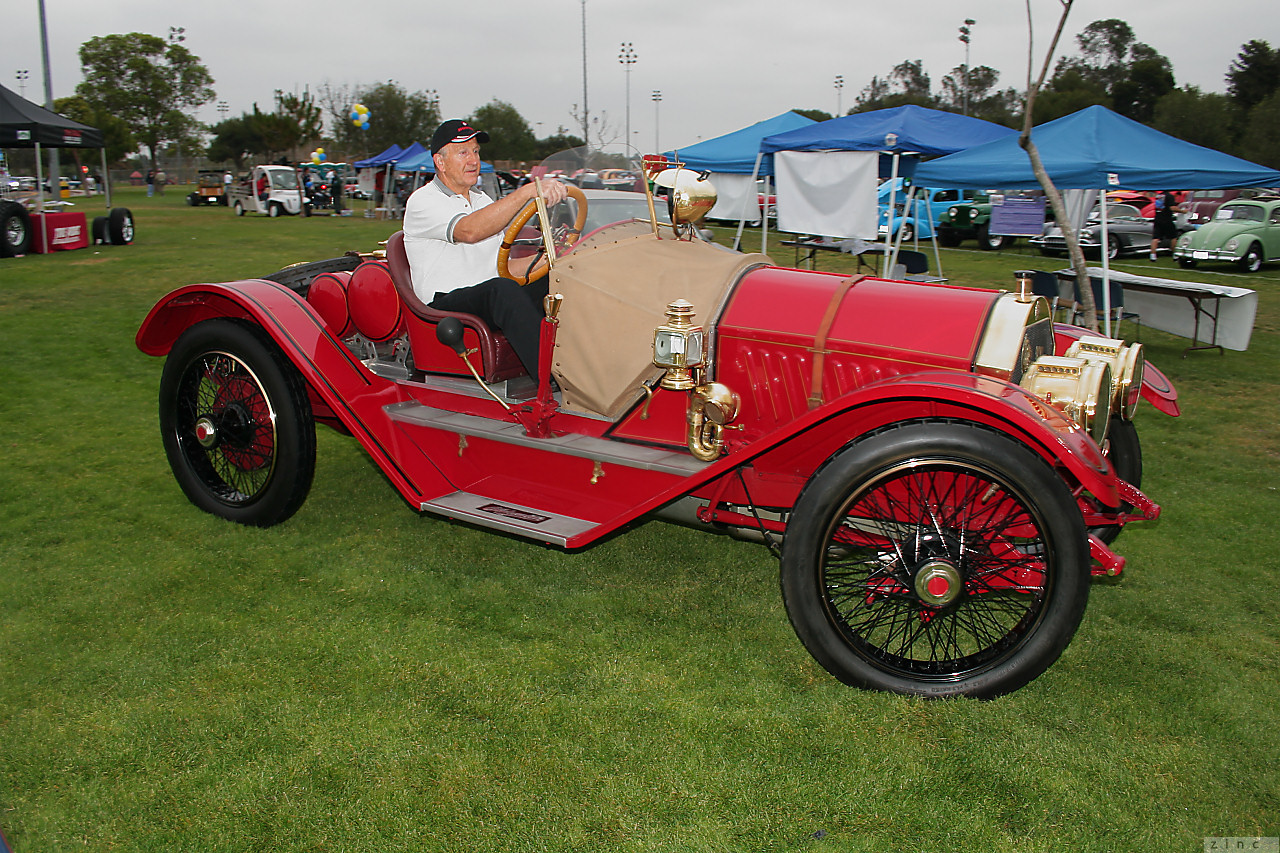
Oldsmobile Series 28

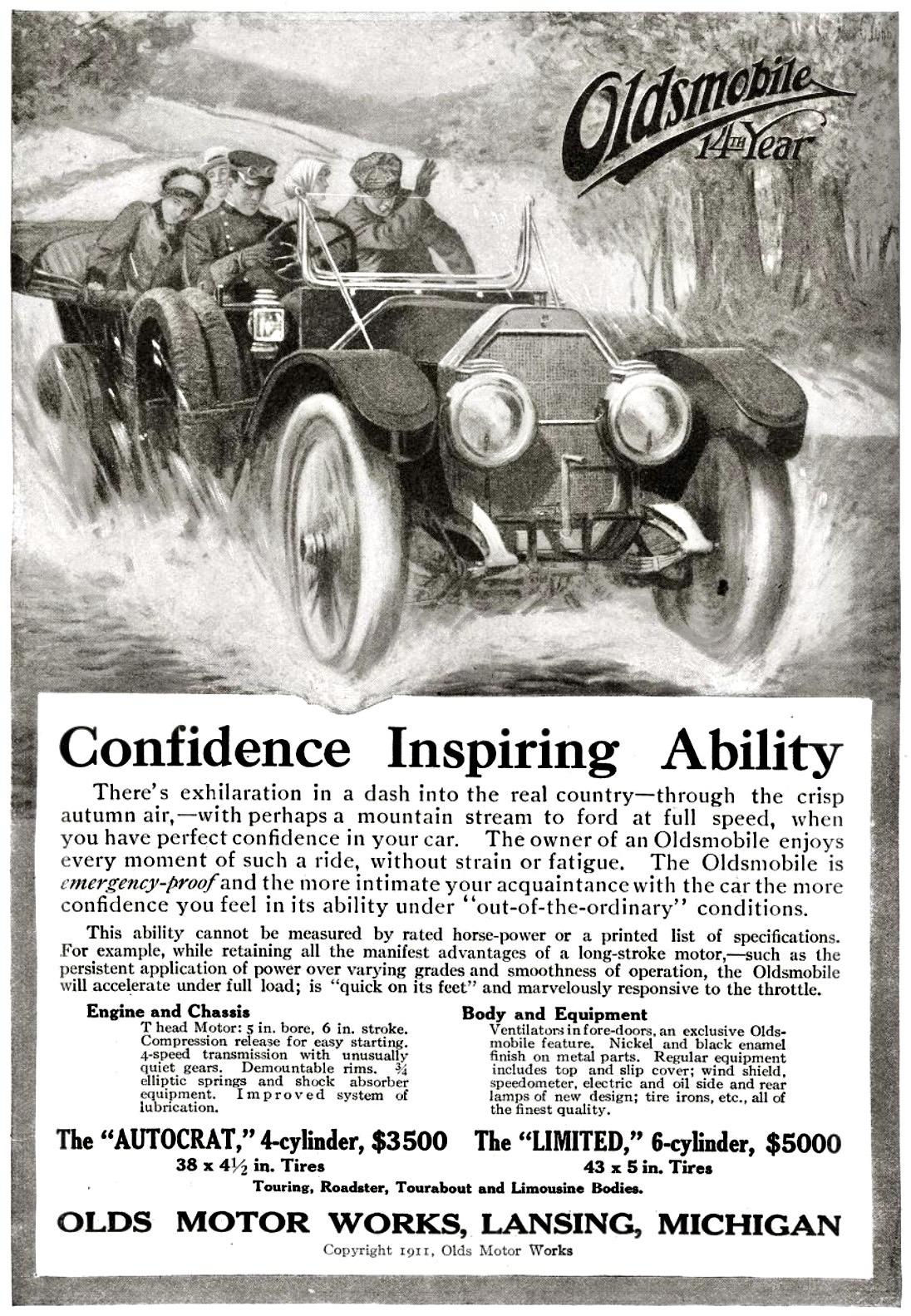
Oldmobile Autocrat (1911)

The Oldsmobile Series 28, also known as the Autocrat, was a mid-level four seat passenger car produced by GM's Oldsmobile Division for 1911 and 1912. It was based on the top-level Oldsmobile Limited (Series 23, 24, 27) while using a four-cylinder engine, and was manufactured in Lansing, Michigan.

== History ==
The Series 28 was equipped with a large side-valve, in-line 471 cu in (7,718 cc) four-cylinder engine developing 40 bhp. The bore and stroke was 5 by 6 inches (130 mm × 150 mm) and the cylinders were cast in pairs. It had a wheelbase of 124–126 in (3,150–3,200 mm) based on the bodystyle offered of a touring car, roadster or a 4-door sedan. For 1912 it was renamed the Series 32 with minor appearance changes. Due to the retail price of US$3,500 ($120,937 in 2025 dollars) for a choice of the touring sedan or runabout while the closed body limousine was US$5,000 ($172,768 in 2025 dollars) 1911 saw 1000 vehicles manufactured and in 1912 there were 500 which placed it as a contender against the Packard Four, and made Oldsmobile the top model in GM's catalog against the Cadillac Model A and Buick Model 10. The Autocrat replaced the Oldsmobile Series 22 and was replaced by the Oldsmobile Six as the mid-level model.
