= Dave Lyon (designer) =

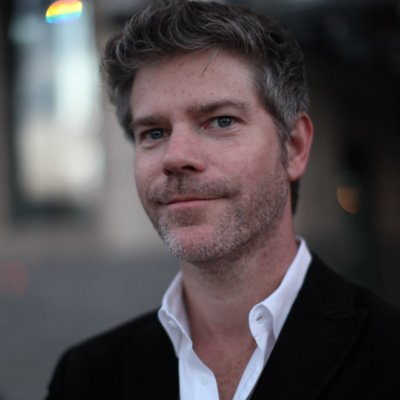
- Born: David Lyon; November 8, 1968 (age 57); Naperville, Illinois
- Other name: Dave Lyon
- Occupation: Car designer
- Employer(s): General Motors (1990-2012); VinFast (2017-Present)
- Known for: Chief Designer for Buick and GMC

David Lyon (born November 8, 1968) is a car designer best known for his work with General Motors where he worked directly from college in 1990 until 2012. He is originally from Naperville, Illinois, United States and has been moved around several General Motors design studios during his career. He is currently working for VinFast, a Vietnamese automobile manufacturer.

== Career ==
Lyon studied at the College for Creative Studies in Detroit, Michigan where he received a bachelor of fine arts in transportation design in 1990. Directly after college he joined General Motors at the Design Center in General Motors Technical Center, Warren, Michigan where he was first assigned to the Oldsmobile design studios. In 1997, he joined the Cadillac design studio where he helped to design the first generation Cadillac CTS and in 1998 he moved to the Buick Brand Studio and served as Chief Designer.

In 2002, Lyon was appointed Director of Design for the three Truck Interior Studios in where he led teams working on all GM future production interiors, including the Cadillac Escalade, Chevrolet Tahoe/GMC Yukon, and Hummer H3. In 2004, Lyon was executive director of GM Asia Pacific Design where he led teams in Korea, China and Australia to develop the Chevrolet Cruze, Sonic and Spark.

In 2007, he relocated back to Michigan when he was appointed Executive Director Interior Design of North America. In that role, Lyon was responsible for seven studios, including Perceptual Quality, Color & Trim, User Experience, and several Design Studios responsible for the design of Cadillac, Buick, GMC, and Chevrolet interiors. In 2012, he was appointed head of GM Europe Design, the German base for Opel/Vauxhall design work but left GM with no notice end of July 2012.

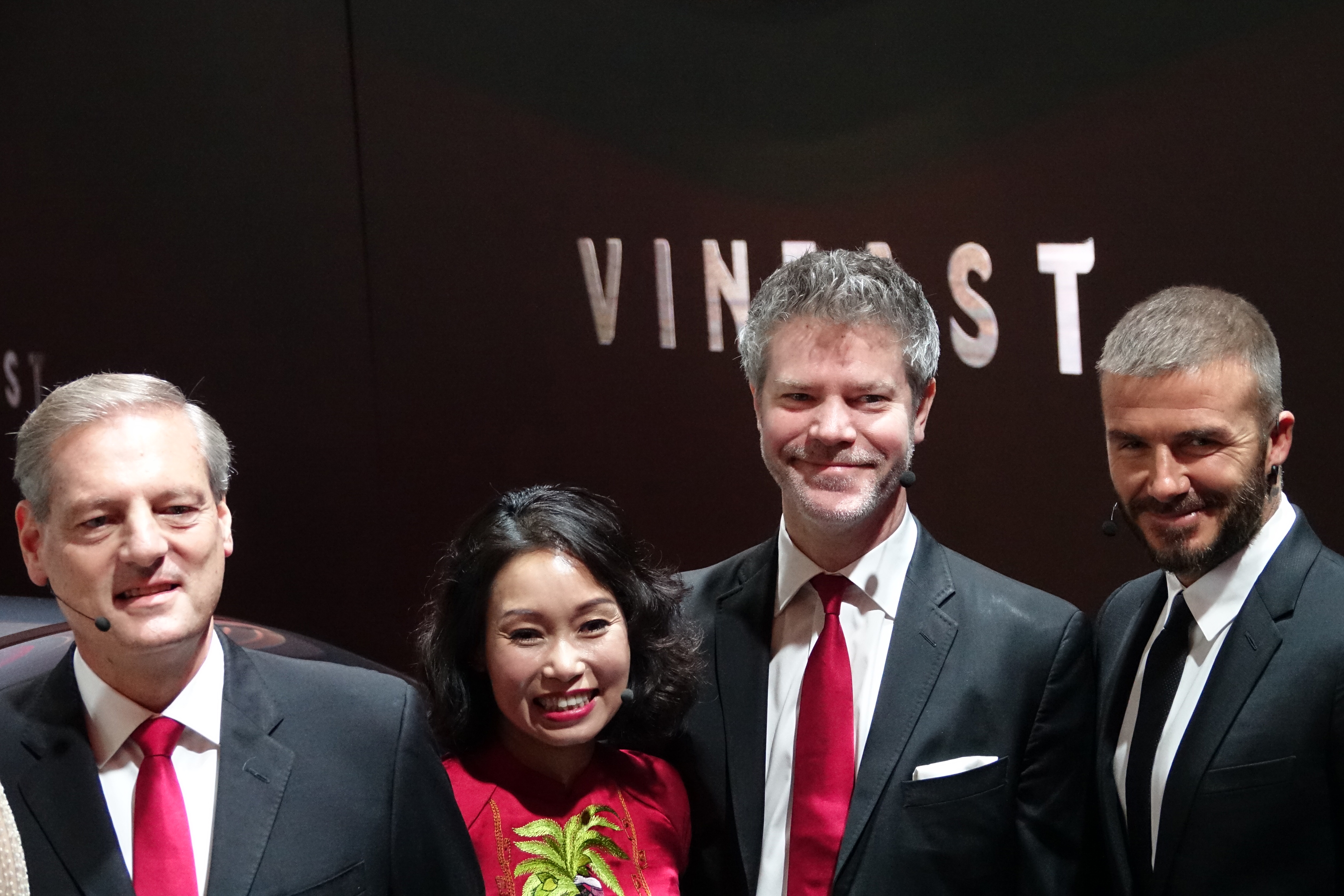
From left: James DeLuca (general director Vinfast), Lê Thị Thu Thủy (VP Vingroup), David Lyon (design director Vinfast) and David Beckham

After leaving GM, he established his own company David Lyon Design LLC.

In June 2013, Lyon started Pocketsquare Design, a studio focused on automotive interior user experience design.

In 2017, David became Director of Design for Vietnamese automobile manufacturer VinFast.

After serving as Director of Design at VinFast until December 2022, he became Director of Design, HMI and User Experience at Nu Ride Inc. in 2023. Since September 2023, he have been associate director of Automotive UX/UI at Harman International.

== Significant designs ==
- Oldsmobile Alero Alpha (concept car)
- Oldsmobile Expression (concept car)
- Oldsmobile Alero
- Buick LaCrosse (concept car)
- Buick Bengal (concept car)
- Cadillac CTS
- Buick LaCrosse
- Chevrolet WTCC (concept car)
- Buick Riviera (concept car)
- Chevrolet Cruze
- Chevrolet Spark
- Chevrolet Sonic
- Chevrolet Volt
- 2009-2014 Cadillac Interiors
- 2009-2014 Buick Interiors
- 2009-2014 GMC Interiors
- 2009-2014 Chevrolet Interiors
