= Oakland Four =

Car model

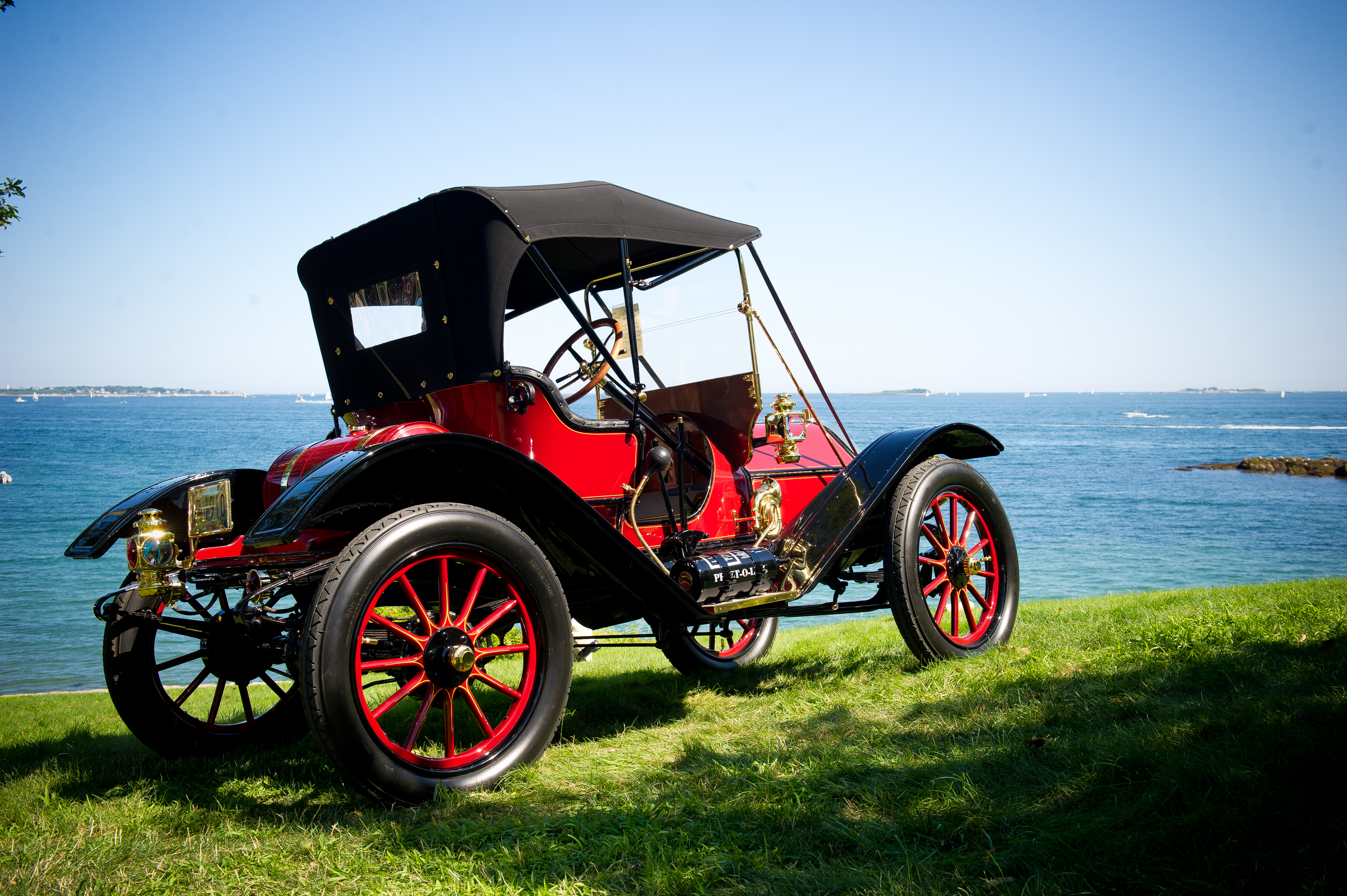
- 1910 Oakland Model 24 Roadster

Overview
- Manufacturer: Oakland (General Motors)
- Model years: 1909–1916
- Assembly: United States: Pontiac, Michigan (Pontiac Assembly)

Body and chassis
- Layout: Front-engine, rear-wheel-drive

Chronology
- Successor: Oakland Six

The Oakland Model A was the first four-cylinder engine offered by the Oakland Motor Company in 1907, which became a division of General Motors in 1909. The Model A was developed and manufactured from former Oakland Motor Company sources while the engine was provided by Northway Motor and Manufacturing Division of GM of Detroit. The Model A was available in several body styles and prices ranged from US$1,300 ($46,583 in 2025 dollars) to US$2,150 ($77,042 in 2025 dollars). Once Oakland became a division of GM, Oldsmobile and Buick shared bodywork and chassis of their four-cylinder models with Oakland. Manufacture of the Oakland was completed in Pontiac, Michigan. Oakland (Pontiac) wouldn't use another four-cylinder engine until 1961 with the Pontiac Trophy 4 engine.

== History ==
The following year the Model A was renamed the Model 40 with a 112 in (2,845 mm) wheelbase while the coachwork choices remained, and by 1910 the four-cylinder was installed in two different body styles with a choice of four different wheelbases with individual model names. The Model 24 roadster had a 96 in (2,438 mm) wheelbase while the longer Model M roadster had a 122 in (3,099 mm) wheelbase. The touring sedan came as Model 25 with a 100 in (2,540 mm) wheelbase, the Model K with a 102 in (2,591 mm) wheelbase, and the Model 33 with a 106 in (2,692 mm) wheelbase.

For model year 1912 the choice of wheelbases offered were reduced to three and the naming conventions were standardized. The Model 30 used a 96 in (2,438 mm) wheelbase and was roadster or touring sedan. The Model 40 added a closed body coupe using a 112 in (2,845 mm) wheelbase, and the Model 45 used a 120 in (3,048 mm) wheelbase and offered either a four- or seven-passenger touring sedan or closed body limousine. Prices for the limousine were listed at US$3,000 ($100,086 in 2025 dollars) which placed it as a competitor with Oldsmobile and Cadillac of the same year.

Model year 1913 saw a fourth choice wheelbase added. The choices were the Model 35 with a 112", the Model 42 with a 116", the Model 45 with a 120" and the Model 40 with a 214 in (5,436 mm) wheelbase. The Model 45 Limousine was still listed at US$3,000 while the longest wheelbase was the Model 40 and was a touring sedan only.

1914 saw an elimination of a wheelbase choice with the Model 43 using a 116" and two closed body choices of a coupe or sedan or a touring sedan, the Model 35 and Model 36 both using a 112" and coachwork choices of roadster, cabriolet or touring sedan.

The last year a four-cylinder engine was offered was for 1915 and 1916 using a 112" wheelbase as the company switched to a straight-six, while the first Oakland V8 was offered in 1915, sourced from the Northway Engine Division of GM. As Oakland began to positioned as the entry-level GM product, prices for the Model 37 and Model 38 using a 112" wheelbase were documented at US$1,050 ($31,067 in 2025 dollars) and offered a choice of touring sedan, roadster or speedster for the same price.

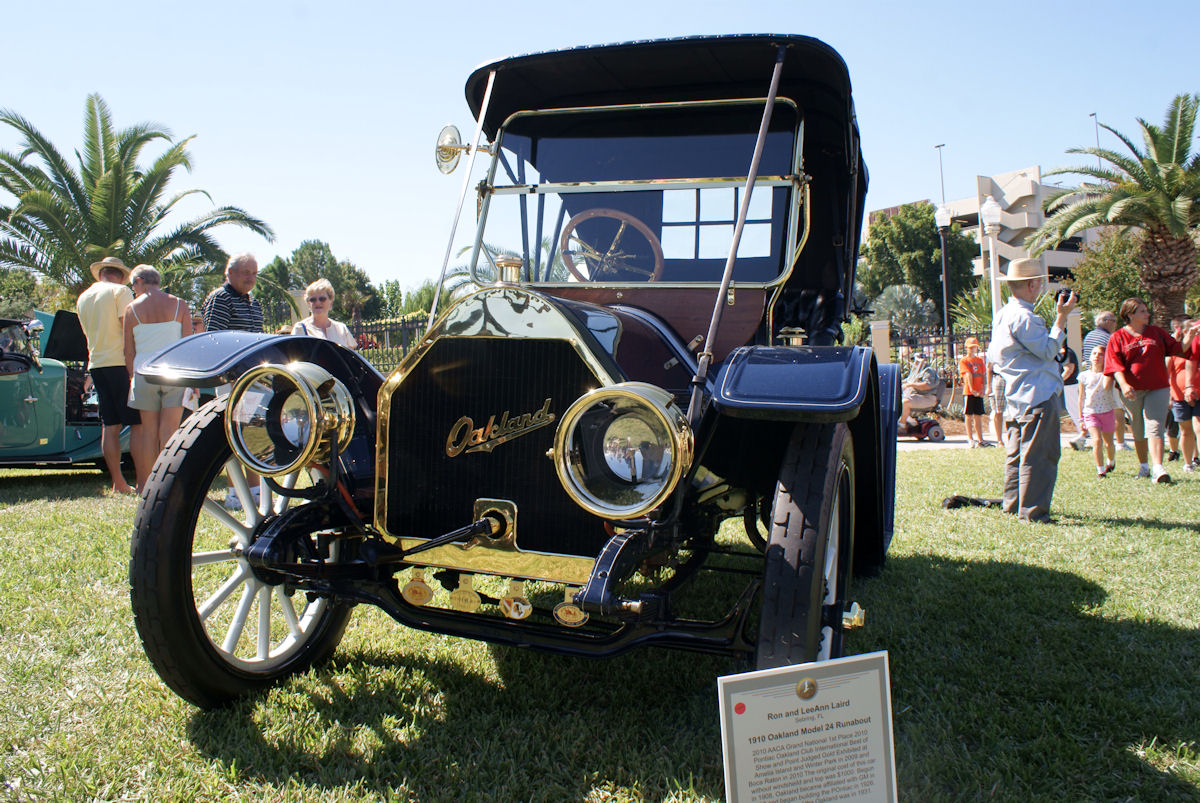
1910 Oakland Model 24 roadster

1910 Oakland Model 25 touring sedan

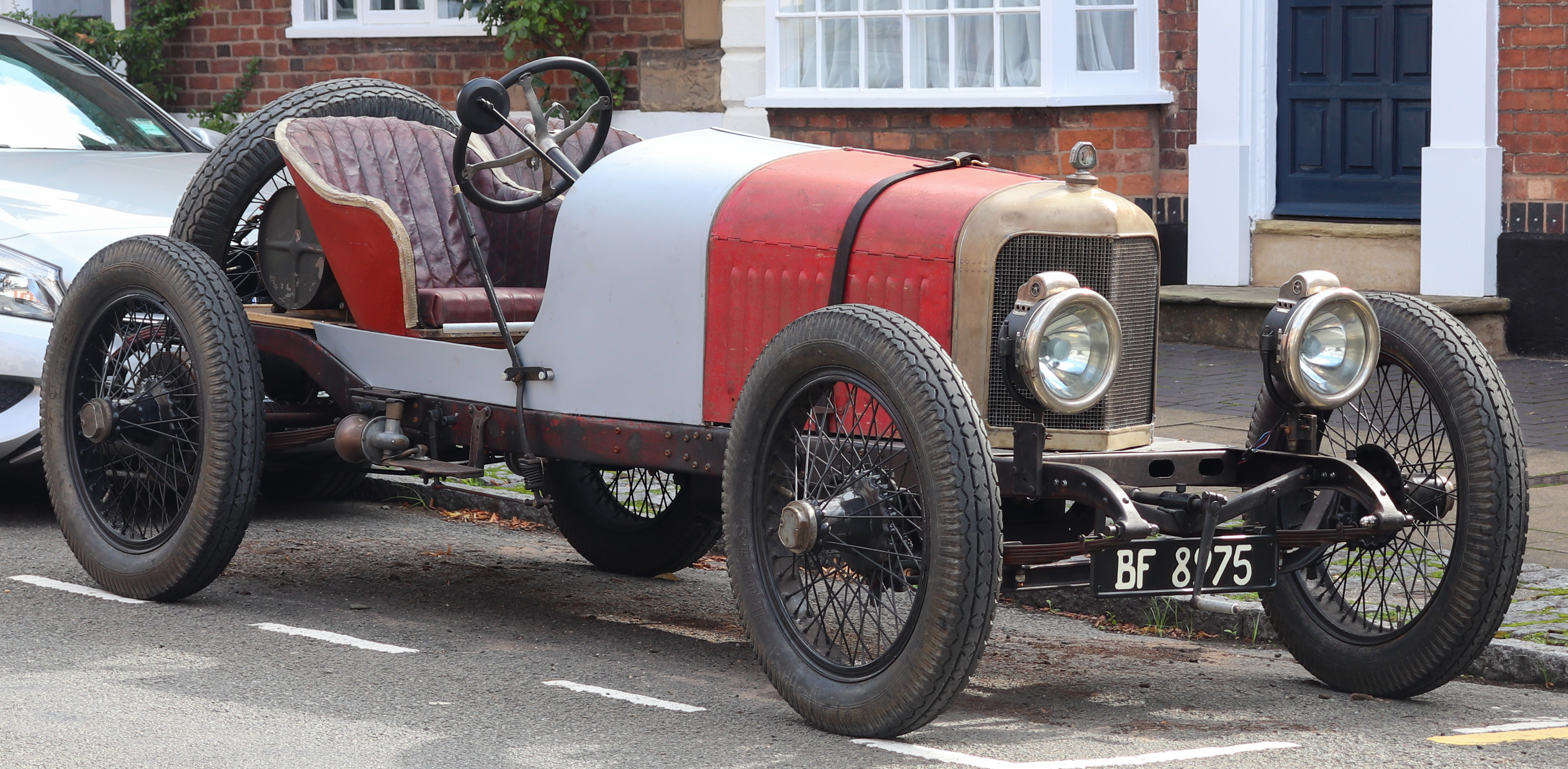
1915 Oakland Model 37 speedster

== See also ==
- Buick Model 10
- Cadillac Model Thirty
- Oldsmobile Series 22
