= VinFast Fadil =

Vietnamese crossover hatchback

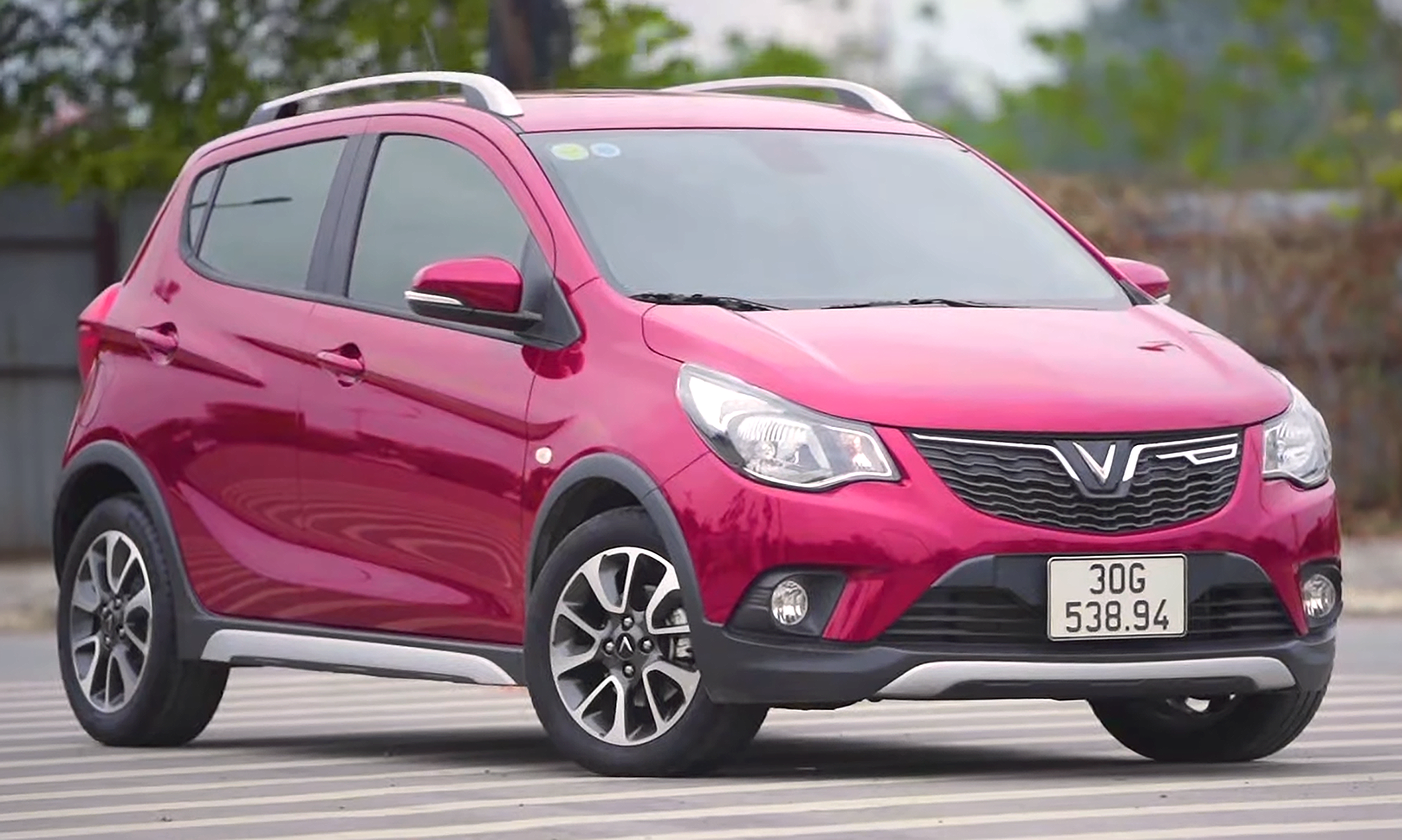
- VinFast Fadil (2020 model year)

Overview
- Manufacturer: VinFast
- Production: 2019–2022
- Assembly: Vietnam: Haiphong (VinFast Trading and Production LLC)
- Designer: Dave Lyon

Body and chassis
- Class: City car (A)
- Body style: 5-door hatchback
- Layout: Front-engine, front-wheel-drive
- Platform: Gamma II
- Related: Chevrolet Spark (M400); Opel Karl / Vauxhall Viva

Powertrain
- Engine: Petrol: 1.4 L GM LV7 I4
- Transmission: CVT

Dimensions
- Wheelbase: 2,385 mm (93.9 in)
- Length: 3,675 mm (144.7 in)
- Width: 1,633 mm (64.3 in)
- Height: 1,496 mm (58.9 in)
- Curb weight: 2,216 lb (1,005 kg)

Chronology
- Successor: VinFast VF 5

The VinFast Fadil is an A-segment crossover hatchback produced by Vietnamese automaker VinFast between 2019 and 2022. The vehicle is a rebadged Opel Karl.

== Gallery ==
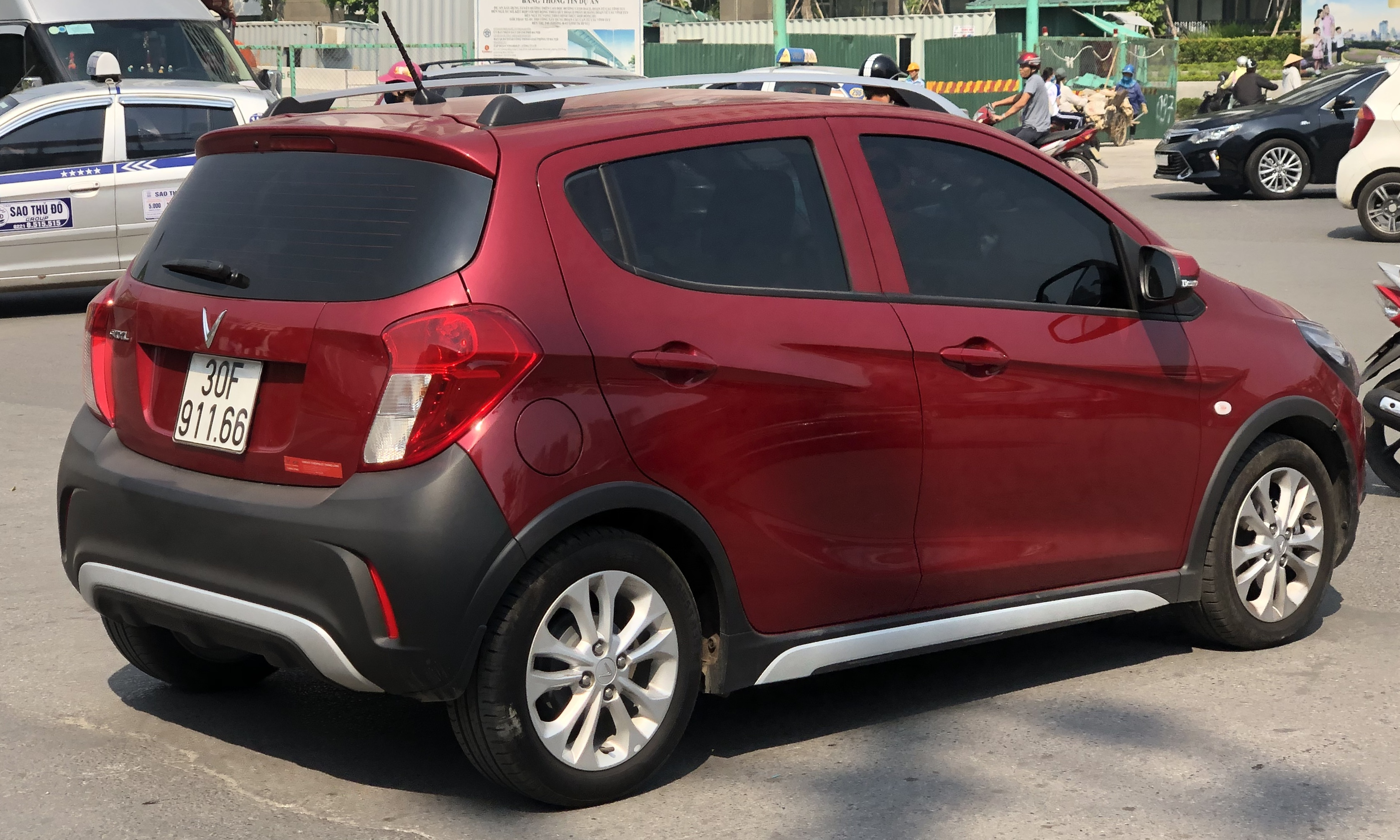
Rear view

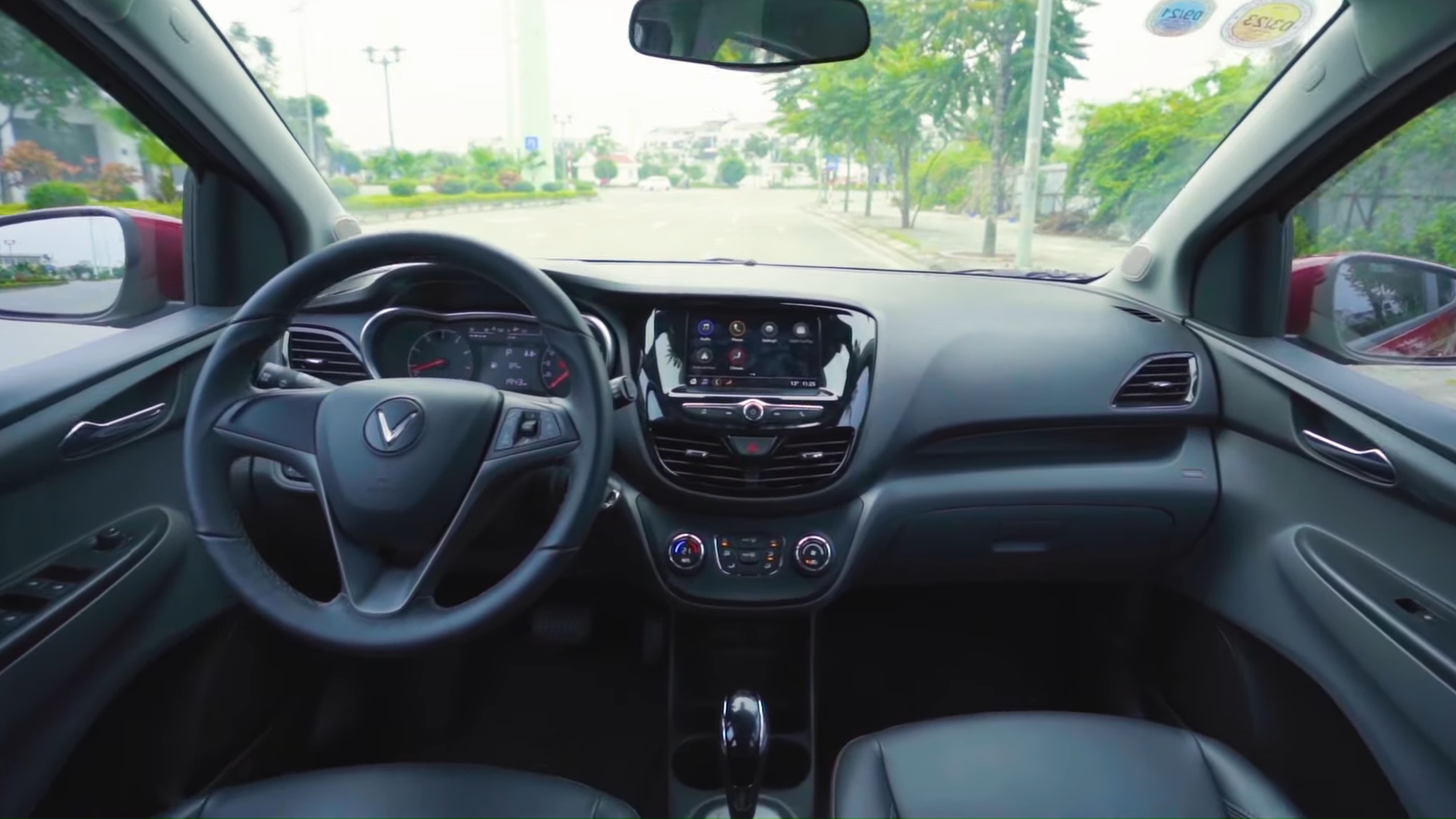
Interior

== Safety ==
The VinFast Fadil received a 4-star rating with an accumulated score of 69.97 points by ASEAN NCAP in 2019 with detail of 32.61 points for the AOP category, 17.91 points for the COP category and 19.44 points for the SATs.

ASEAN NCAP test results Vinfast Fadil (2019)
Test	Points
Overall:	5 /5 stars
Adult occupant:	32.61
Child occupant:	17.91
Safety assist:	19.44

== Sales ==
Year	Vietnam
2020	18,316
2021	24,128

The Fadil was the best selling car in Vietnam in 2021.

== See also ==
- Opel Karl
- Chevrolet Spark
