= Janney (automobile) =

Defunct American motor vehicle manufacturer

The Janney was a brass era automobile assembled in Flint, Michigan by the Janney Motor Company in 1906.

== History ==
Mr. Janney, who some historical accounts identify as E. Stanton Janney, a naval armaments engineer who had assisted in creating large coastal defense guns, was caught up in the enthusiasm of building a car at the turn of the 20th Century and decided to compete.

The Janney automobile offered a four-cylinder engine that was a break from the many one- and two-cylinder engine vehicles produced at the time, and caught the attention of William C. Durant. The Janney Motor Company was set up in the Buick plant in Flint, Michigan. Two prototypes and four production versions were built before the company was absorbed by Buick.

The Janney was later redesigned, adding the overhead valve architecture perfected by Walter Marr of Buick and Enos Anson DeWaters, who had previously worked for the Thomas Motor Company. Together they introduced the 1908 Buick Model 10 as a competitor to the Ford Model T.
