= Buick Model B =

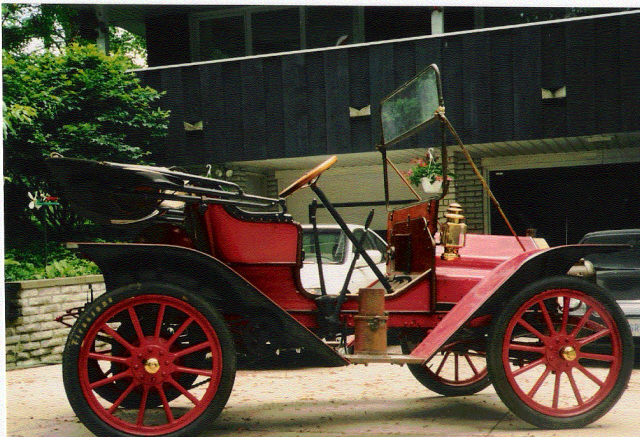
- Buick Model 14

Overview
- Manufacturer: Buick (General Motors)
- Model years: 1904–1911
- Assembly: United States: Jackson, Michigan

Body and chassis
- Body style: Torpedo
- Layout: Front-engine, rear-wheel-drive

Powertrain
- Engine: 2-cylinder horizontally opposed overhead valve engine
- Transmission: Two-speed (plus reverse) planetary transmission with cone clutch

Chronology
- Successor: Buick Four

The Buick Model B was Buick's first model as an independent company, later becoming part of General Motors in 1908. It was built in Jackson, Michigan. A model B was exhibited in 1905 at the New York Auto Show as a promotion of the model C which would be the same. William C. Durant introduced the car himself at the exhibit, and took new car orders at the car show, raising sales from 37 cars in 1904 to 750 in 1905. It had a 2-cylinder, horizontally opposed engine – the world's first production OHV (overhead valve) engine – installed lengthwise within the frame, and had a planetary transmission with a cone clutch and two forward speeds, plus one reverse gear. The engine was rated at 21 bhp. In later years, it was renamed as improvements were made. It had a retail price of US$950 ($34,042 in 2025 dollars) for the touring sedan.

The Model B / C continued to be made, as model F, G, and 14, but was dropped after 1911 as Buick had been promoting 4 cylinder cars, starting with the D in 1907.

- Model B (1903–1904)
- Model C (1905)
- Model F & G (1906–1910)

== Model B (1904) ==
The tourer was equipped with a two-cylinder horizontally opposed engine that drew 21 bhp (15.4 kW) of power at 1230 rpm from 2606 cc. The wheelbase of the chain-driven, front-engined, rear-wheel drive vehicle was 2210 mm. Like all Buicks at the beginning of the 20th century, the Model B had a planetary gearbox with two gears for gear selection. As standard, the cars were painted indigo blue and had bright yellow wooden spoke wheels.

The model was introduced on August 13, 1904. Of the 37 examples produced, one won the 1904 Eagle Rock race and another one won the Race to the Clouds at Mt. Washington.

== Model C (1905) ==
In 1905, the Model C replaced the Model B. Engine output increased with unchanged displacement to 22 bhp (16.2 kW) at 1200 rpm. As standard, the cars were painted royal blue and had ivory-colored wooden spoke wheels. Unlike their predecessors, they offered seating for five persons.

A total of 750 Model C cars were built.
