= Opel Karl =

City car

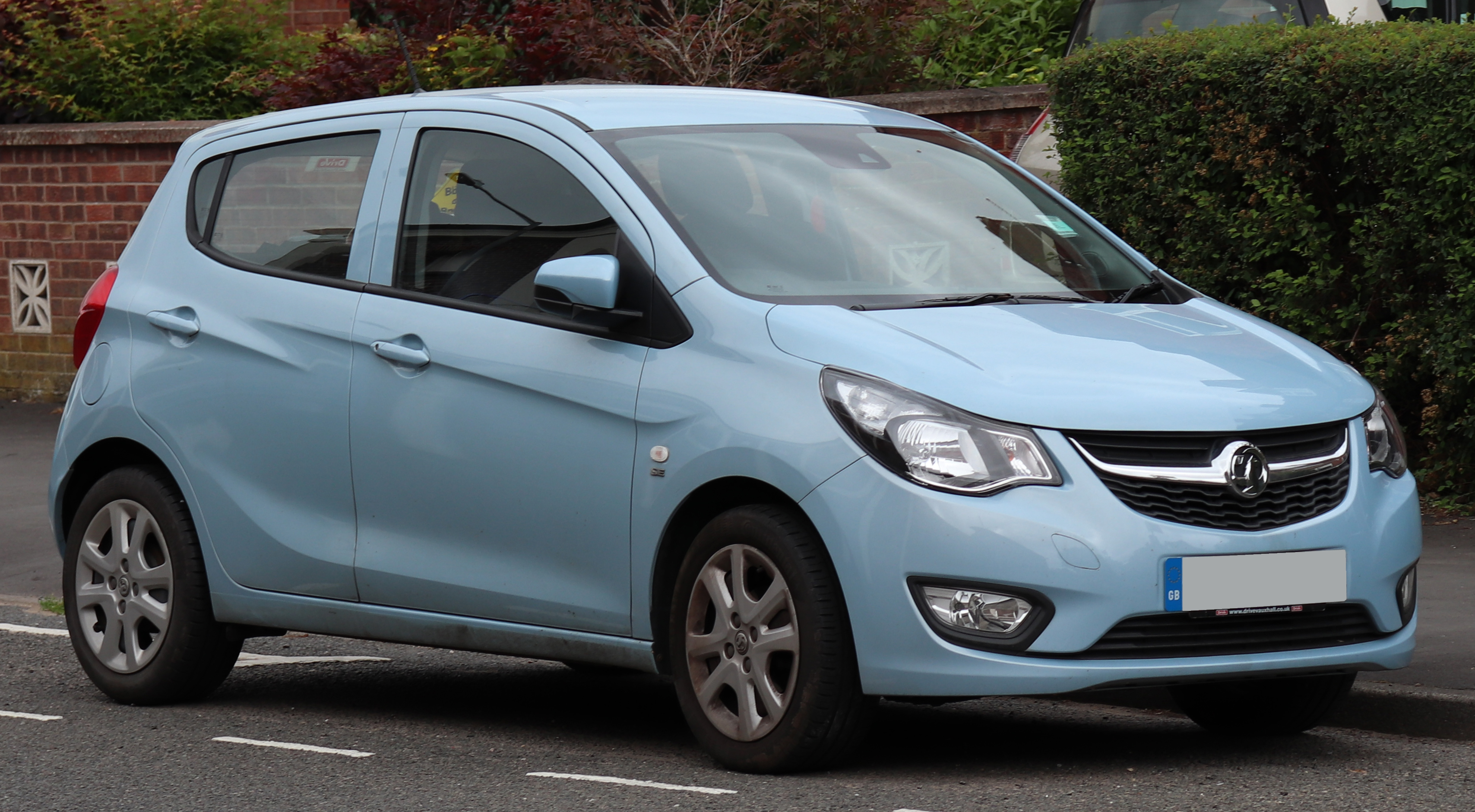
- 2016 Vauxhall Viva SE

Overview
- Manufacturer: GM Korea
- Also called: Vauxhall Viva (UK)
- Production: 2015–2019
- Assembly: South Korea: Changwon
- Designer: Mark Adams; Quentin Huber (Karl Rocks)

Body and chassis
- Class: City car (A)
- Body style: 5-door hatchback
- Layout: Front-engine, front-wheel-drive
- Platform: Gamma II
- Related: Chevrolet Spark (M400); VinFast Fadil (Vietnam)

Powertrain
- Engine: 1.0 L GM B10XE I3 (petrol)
- Transmission: 5-speed manual 5-speed automatic

Dimensions
- Wheelbase: 2,385 mm (93.9 in)
- Length: 3,675 mm (144.7 in)
- Width: 1,698 mm (66.9 in)
- Height: 1,476 mm (58.1 in)
- Kerb weight: 939 kg (2,070 lb)

Chronology
- Predecessor: Opel Agila
- Successor: Opel Corsa F

The Opel Karl is a city car with a hatchback manufactured by GM Korea and marketed by Opel as a rebadged and restyled variant of the fourth-generation Chevrolet Spark (M400), replacing the Suzuki-sourced Agila in Opel's range. Named after Adam Opel's eldest son Carl, the city car was discontinued following the sale of Opel to PSA Group in 2019. General Motors marketed a rebadged variant in the United Kingdom as the Vauxhall Viva, resurrecting an old nameplate from 1963 to 1979.

== Overview ==
The Karl is a rebadged and restyled variant of the fourth-generation Chevrolet Spark, manufactured in South Korea. With fuel consumption reaching 4.3 L/100 km (66 mpg_{‑imp}), the Karl's 1.0 L (999 cc) three-cylinder direct injection engine making 55 kW (75 PS) is from the GM engine family. Dimensionally very similar to its predecessor, it is 115 mm (4.5 in) lower, making it almost the same size as the more expensive three-door Opel Adam.

Equipment includes six airbags, ESC with hill start assist, Tyre Pressure Monitoring System (TPMS), electric power steering, cruise control, rear parking sensors, lane departure warning, automatic climate control, start-stop system, a seven-inch display with IntelliLink and OnStar systems, and optional - heated front seats, heated steering wheel, electric sunroof and 16-inch alloy wheels.

The Opel Karl was not sold in all European markets. It was not regularly available in Norway, Sweden, CIS countries, Malta, Eastern Balkans (including Bulgaria and Romania), Greece, Turkey, nor Cyprus.

The Karl had its second world premiere held in Rijeka, Croatia, in 2015. In October 2018, it was announced that the production of the Karl and Viva would be discontinued by the end of 2019.

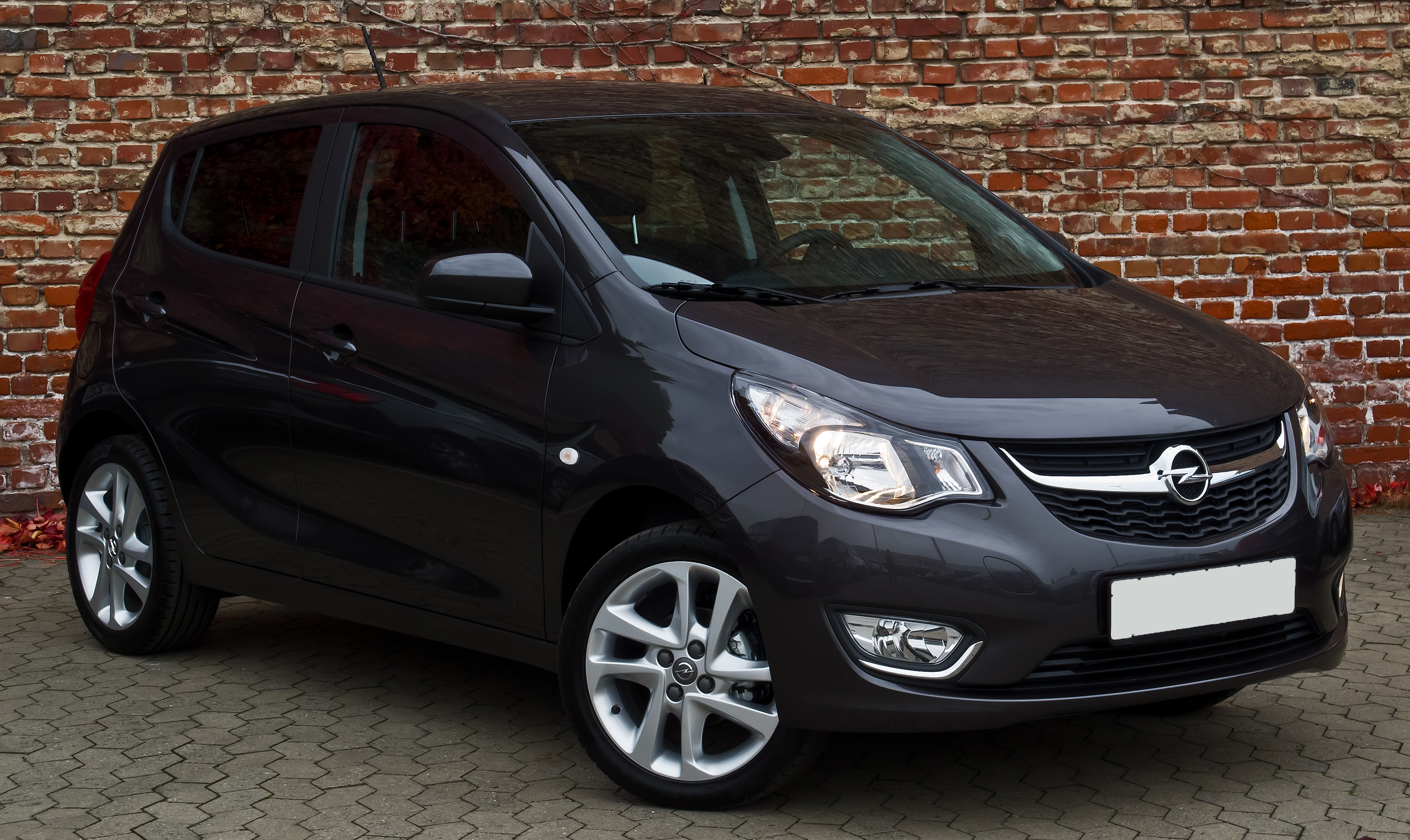
Opel Karl in Germany (front-right view)

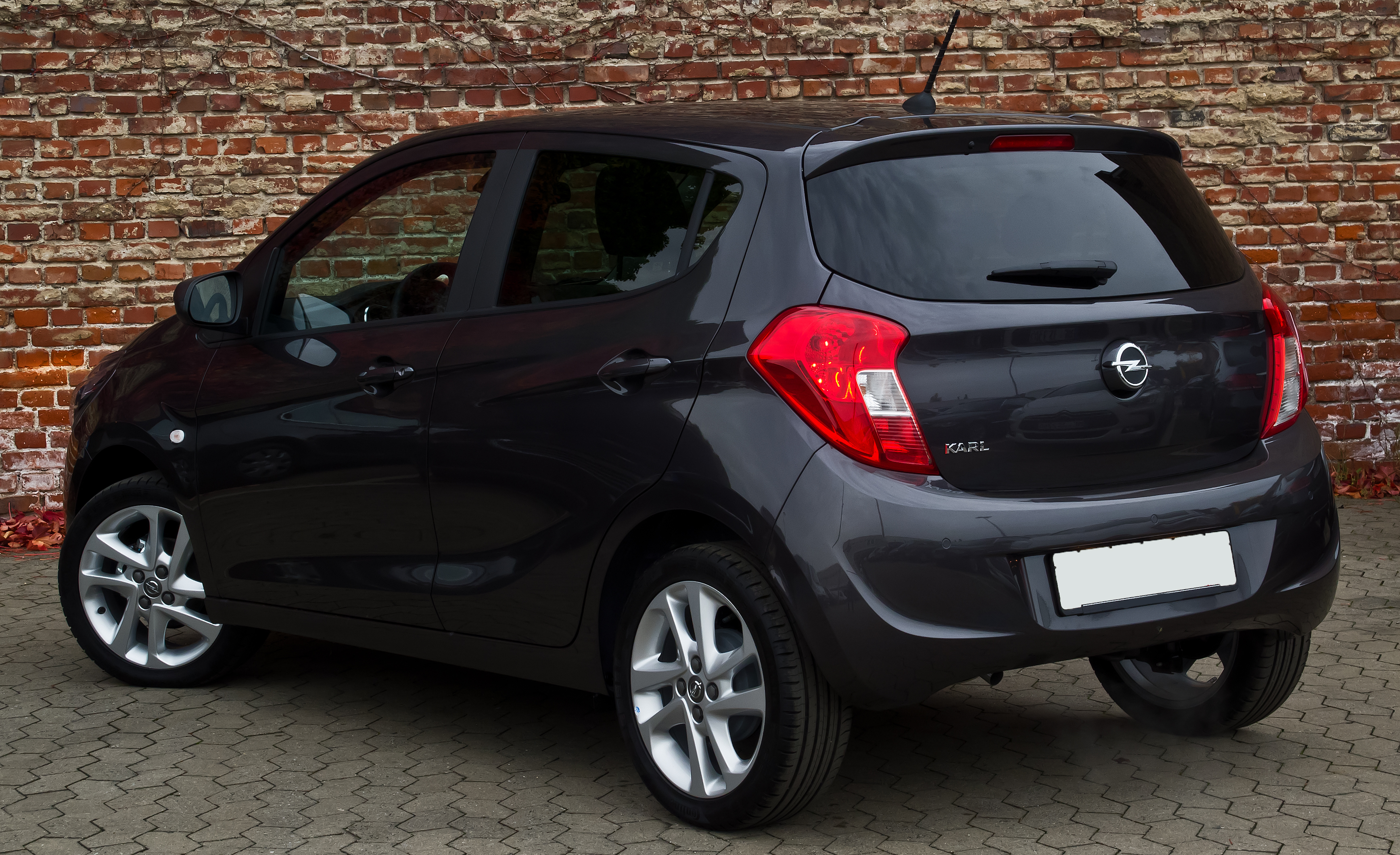
Opel Karl in Germany (rear-left view)

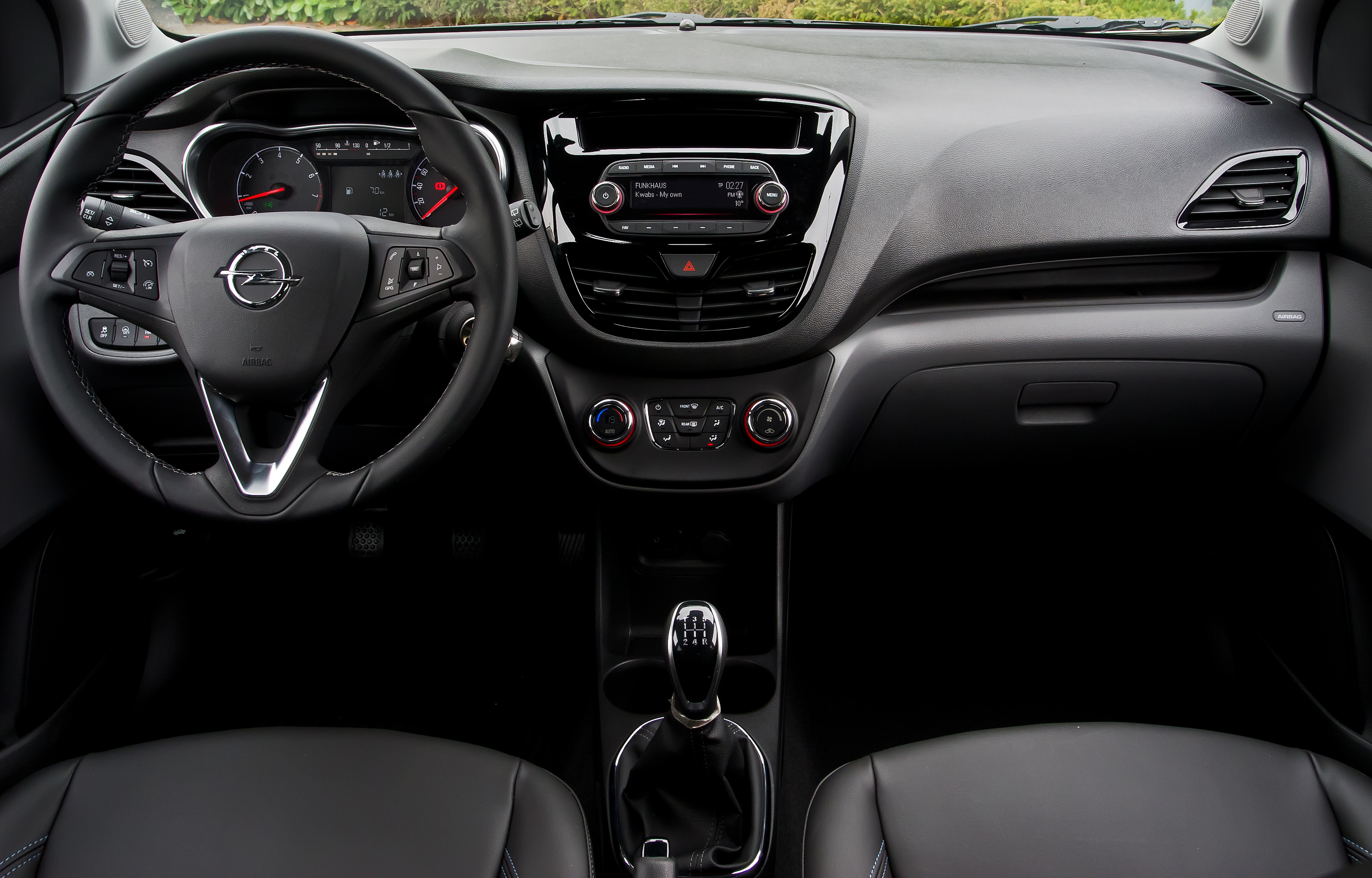
Interior

== Vauxhall Viva ==
The Viva range includes the base SE model, the SE A/C (which has air conditioning as standard, hence the name) and the top SL.

The range has a high level standard specification compared to similar vehicles from other manufacturers, including a lane departure warning system, cruise control, speed limiter, trip computer (instant MPG, average MPG, average speed, stopwatch and trip computer), tyre pressure monitoring system, electronic stability program and traction control, front fog lamps and cornering lamps.

The SL offers digital climate control, partial leather trim and alloy wheels. Options include an electronically operated glass sunroof, a touch screen entertainment system (replacing the 300/300BT stereo unit) and a "Winter Pack" comprising heated seats, steering wheel, and door mirrors.

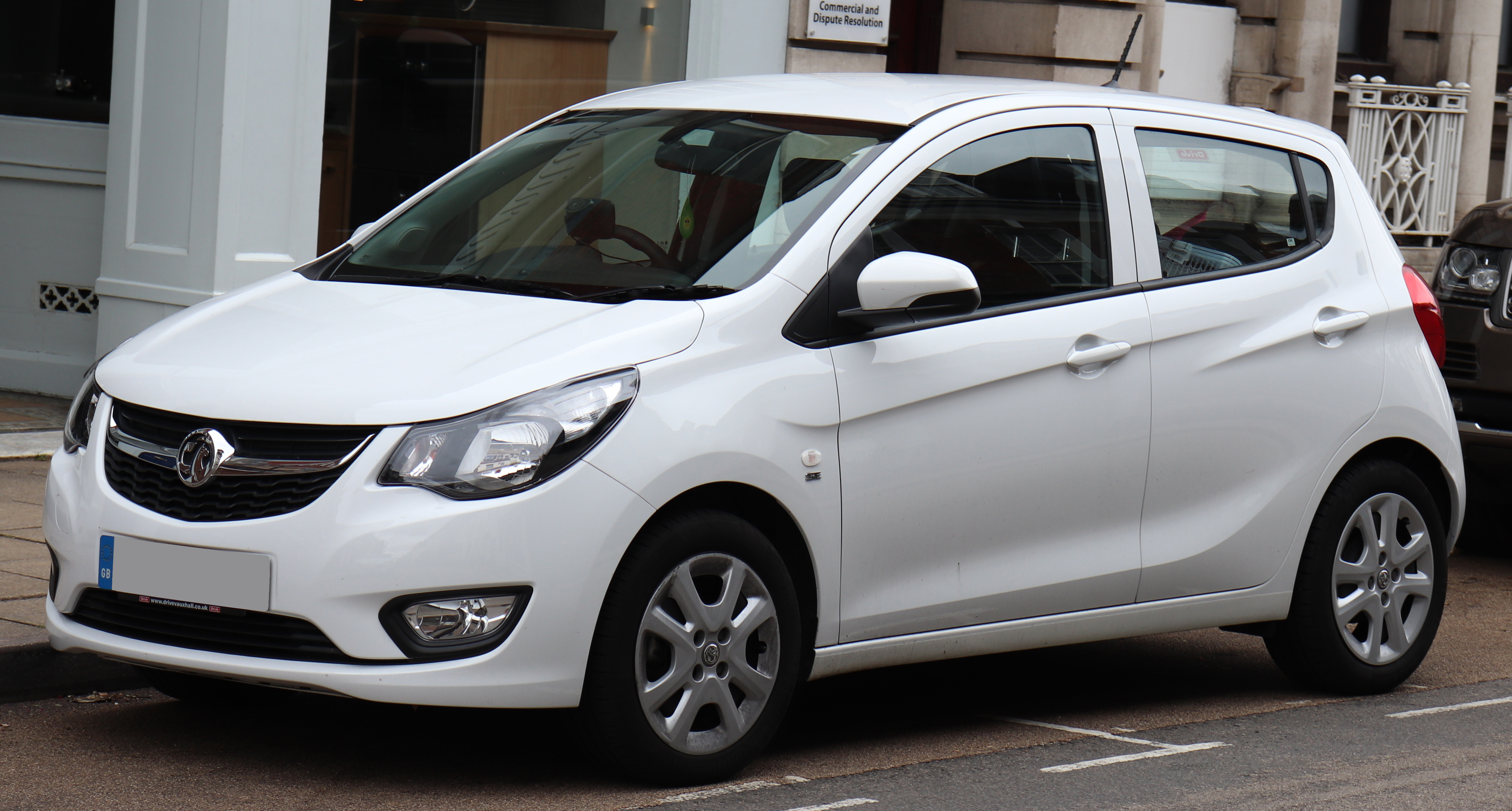
2016 Vauxhall Viva SE (UK)

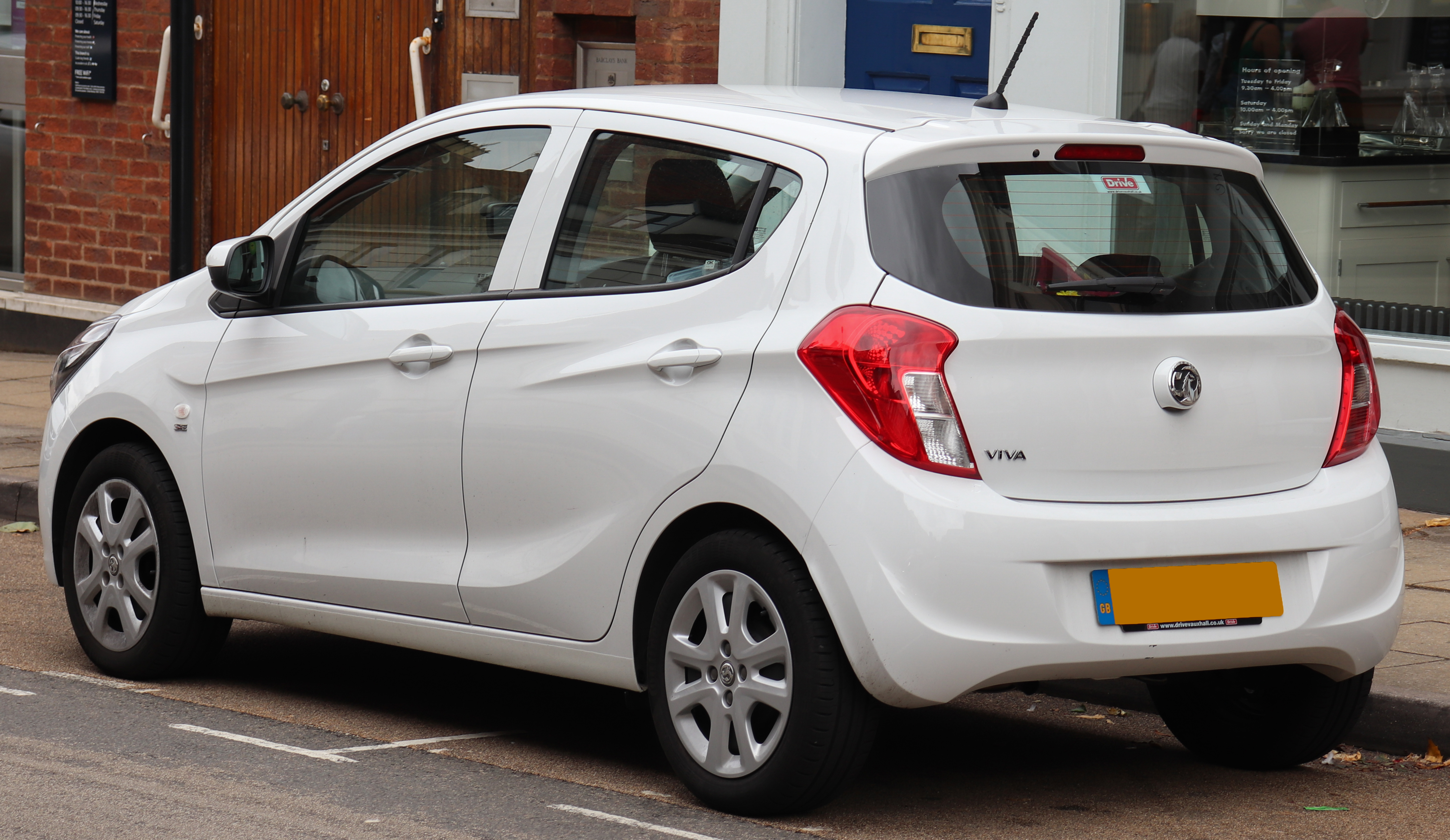
2016 Vauxhall Viva SE (UK)

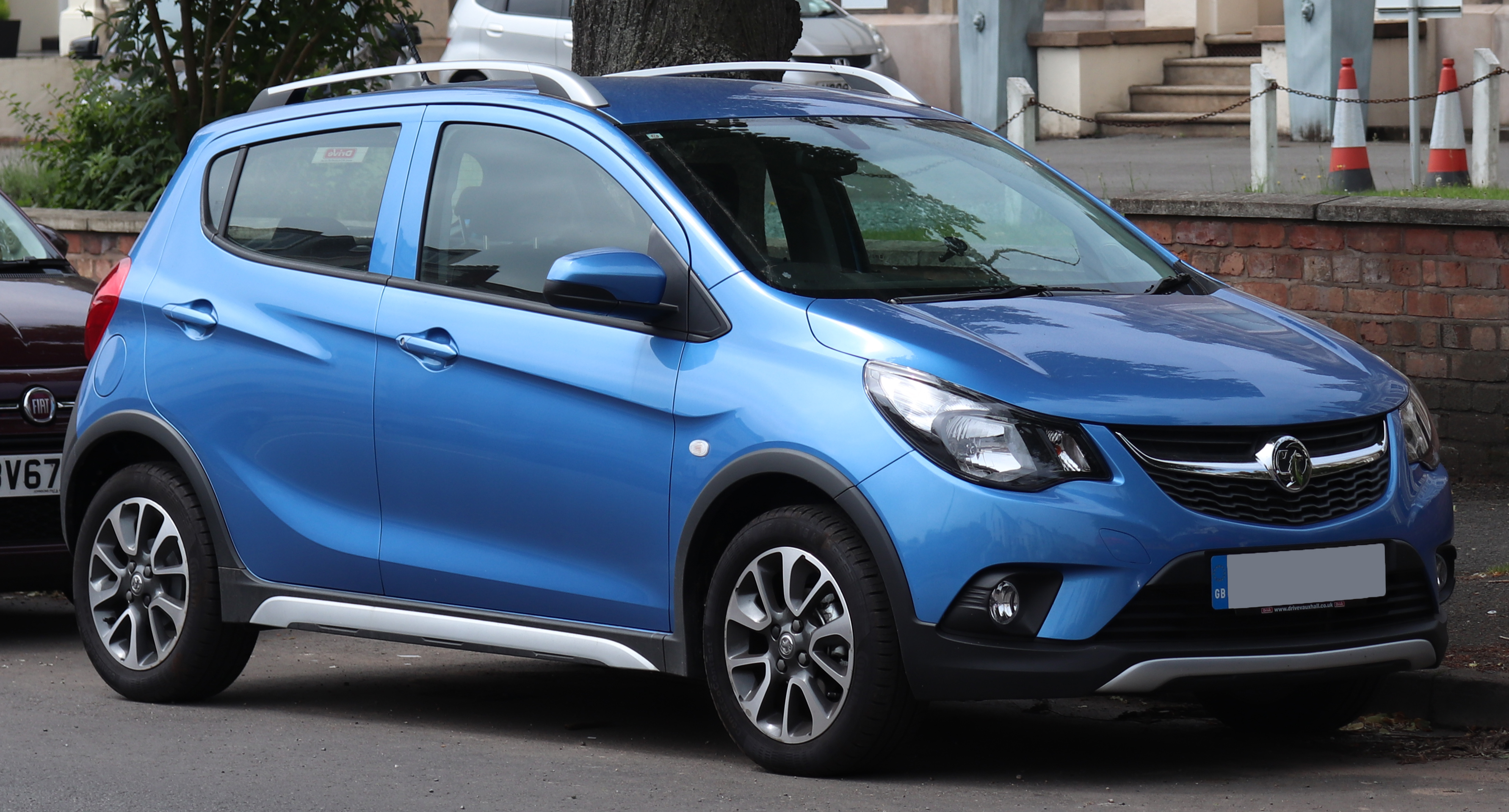
2018 Vauxhall Viva Rocks (UK)

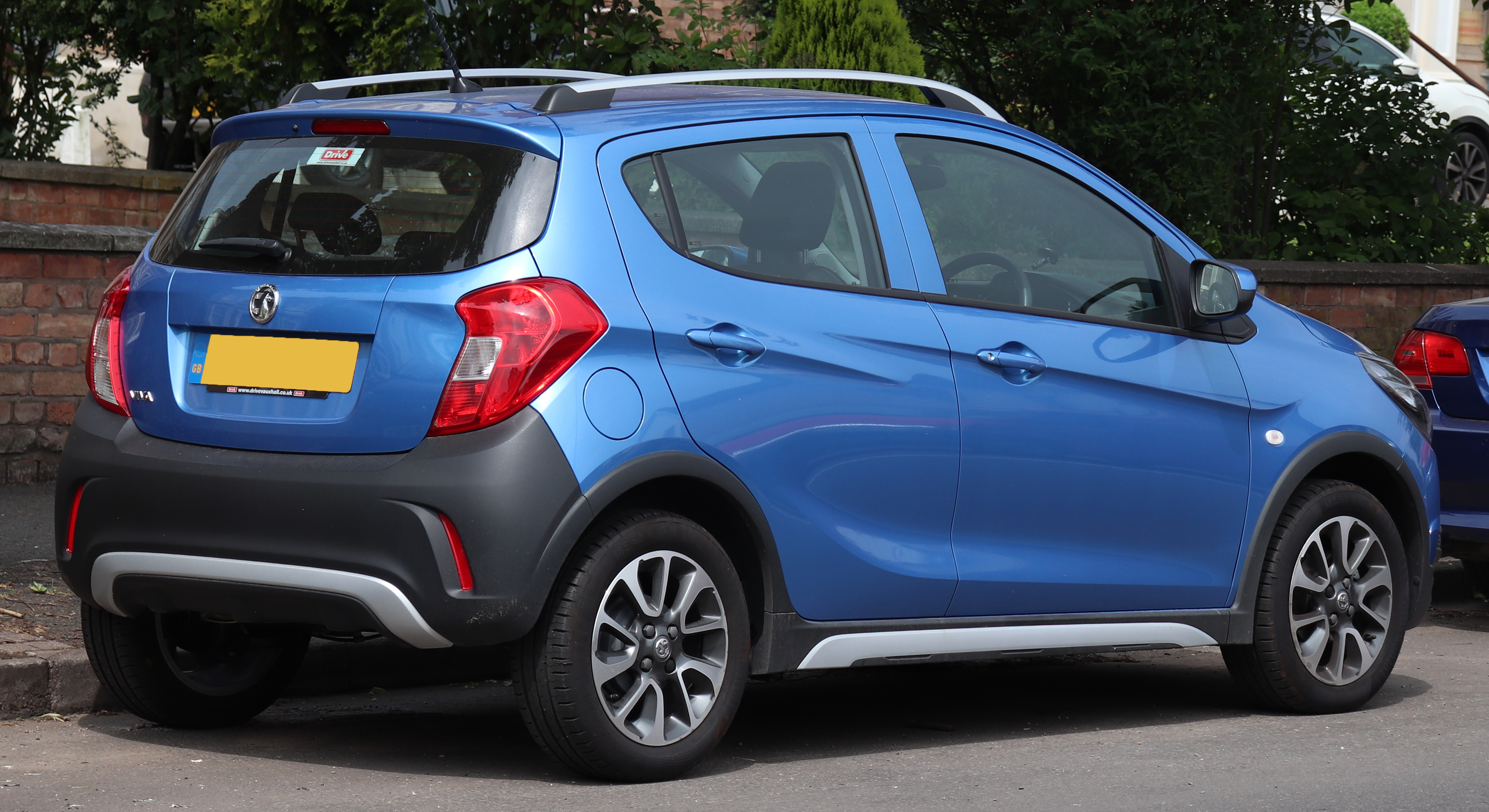
2018 Vauxhall Viva Rocks (UK)

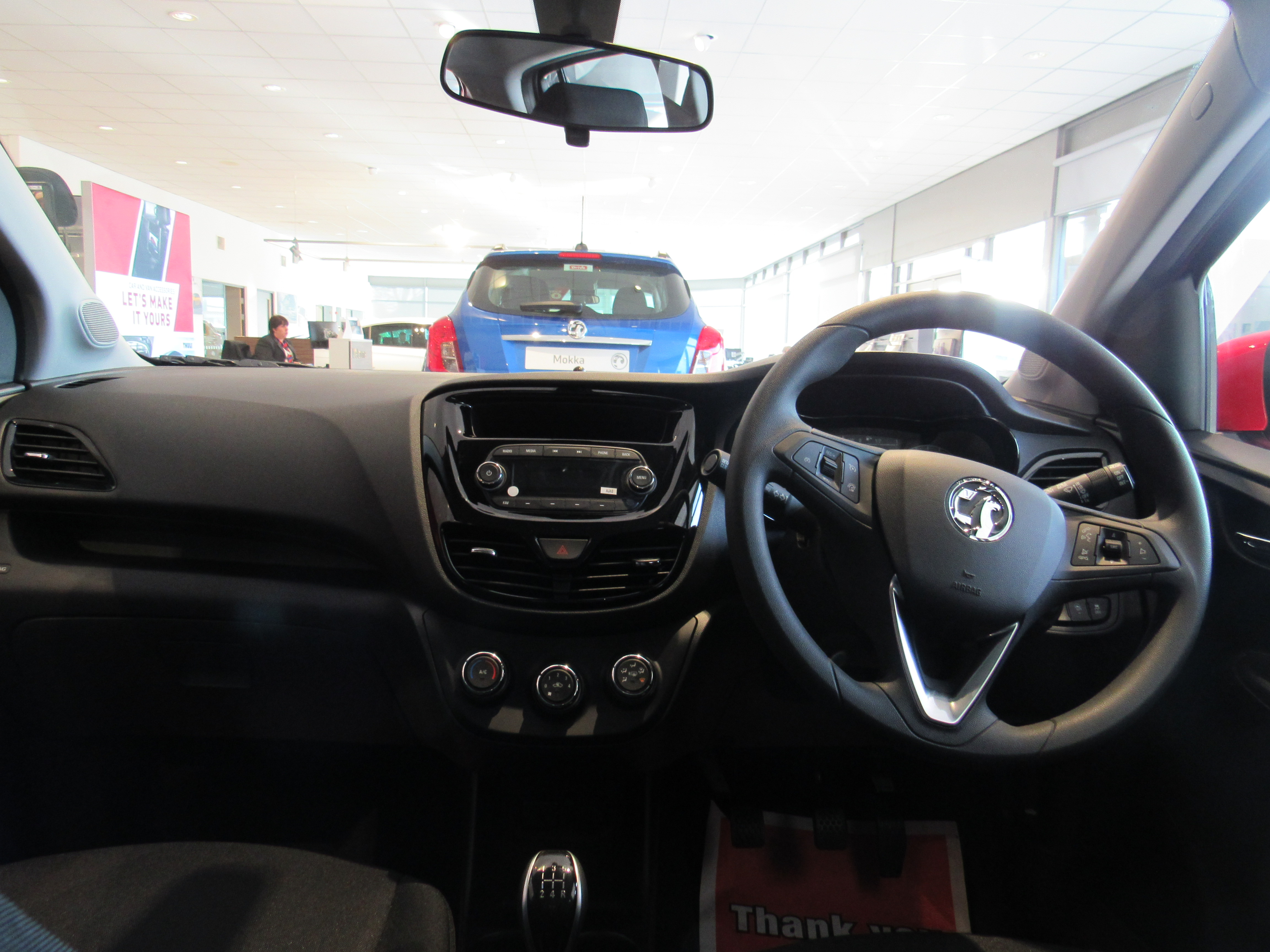
Interior

== Sales ==
Year	Europe	Vietnam
Year	Karl/Viva	VinFast Fadil
2014	11	
2015	28,638	
2016	57,458	
2017	49,516	
2018	48,292	
2019	47,504	
2020		18,316
2021		24,128
