= Buick Bengal =

Concept car developed by Buick

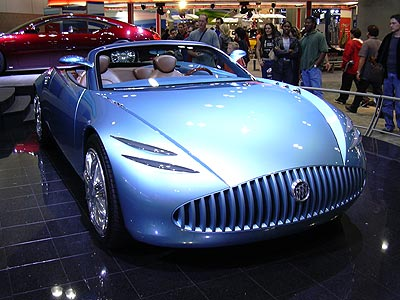

Overview
- Manufacturer: Buick (General Motors)
- Model years: 2001
- Designer: Dave Lyon

Body and chassis
- Class: Concept roadster
- Body style: 2-door roadster

Powertrain
- Engine: 3.4 L V6 (250 hp)
- Transmission: 6-speed Manual transmission

Chronology
- Successor: Buick Velite (concept)

The Buick Bengal was a concept roadster designed and built by Buick. It was first shown to the public at the 2001 North American International Auto Show in Detroit, Michigan.

== History ==
The Bengal was an attempt to rejuvenate the Buick line, and make it seem more appealing to younger people. It was powered by a supercharged 3.4L 250 hp (186 kW) V6, which was mated to a six speed manual transmission. The transmission was mounted ahead of the engine, to allow a more forward placement of the front wheels to improve handling.

Though a 2-seater roadster in general design, the rear decklid can be lifted to reveal two extra seats. One of the most desirable features of the Bengal is its voice activated controls. The car is able to distinguish over 100 commands given to it by voice, which can operate various things from the headlights, windshield wipers, and convertible top, to the heater, navigation system, seat adjustments, and cruise control. The system was named Quiet Servant and it was developed by Visteon Corporation. The dashboard is free of traditional gauges, everything instead is displayed on demand on a single flat panel screen.

In 2001 Buick claimed they wanted to put the Bengal into production, but plans were shelved until 2004 when they revealed the Velite concept, which is a more realistic roadster design.
