= Oldsmobile Aerotech III =

Concept car by Oldsmobile

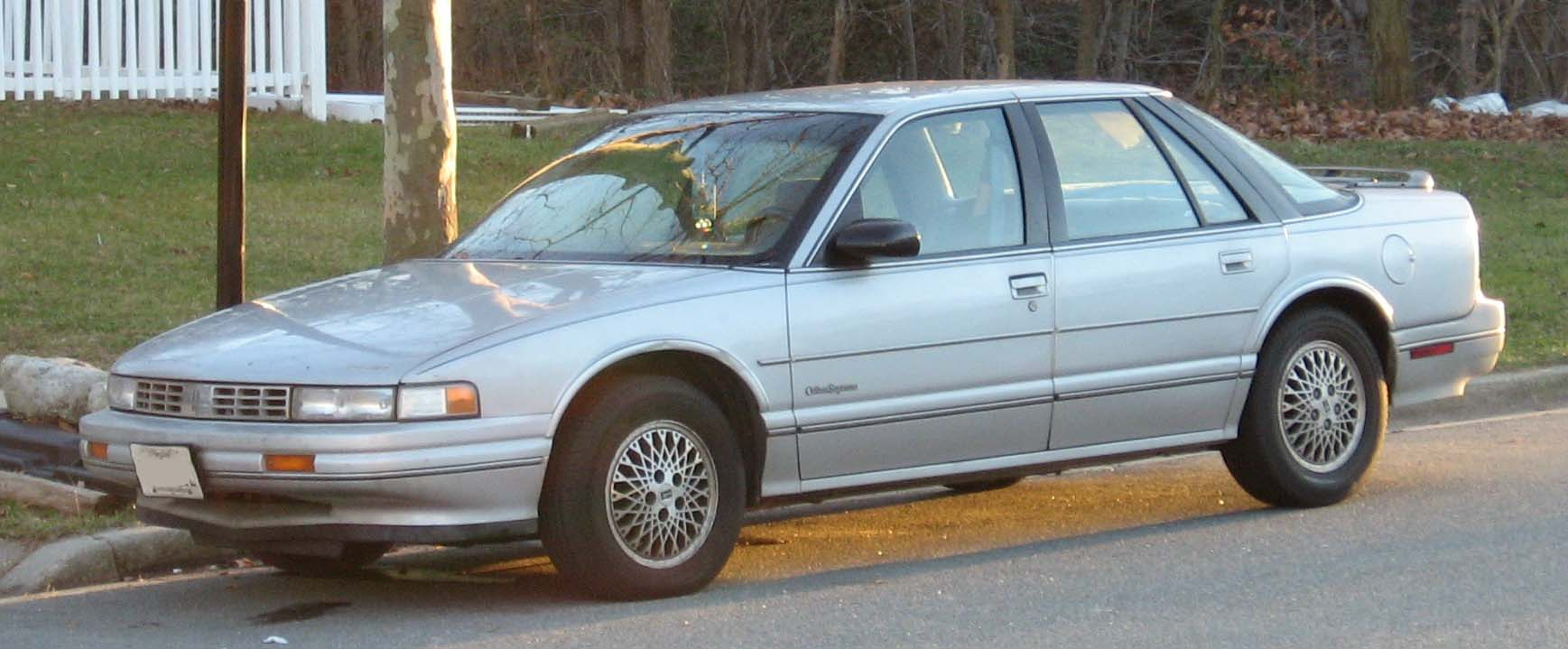
The Oldsmobile Aerotech III was intended to preview the upcoming 1990 Oldsmobile Cutlass Supreme sedan.

The Oldsmobile Aerotech III was one of three concept cars by Oldsmobile, presented in 1989. It was a four-door sedan based heavily on the Cutlass Supreme coupe, and was built to foreshadow the new Cutlass Supreme sedan, which was planned to be released the following year. More of its styling cues (most obviously the front fascia), were present when the Cutlass Supreme got a minor facelift for 1992.

Among the Aerotech III's "concept" features were digital instrumentation, head-up display, four leather-trimmed reclining bucket seats with a center console which ran the whole length of the interior cabin. This center console also had four built-in cupholders and a cooler.

The car was powered by a 230 horsepower (170 kW) supercharged Quad 4 engine.

== See also ==
- Oldsmobile Aerotech
- Oldsmobile Aerotech II
