= Oldsmobile Series 22 =

Car model

The Series 22 Special was a four-seat passenger car produced by the Oldsmobile Division of GM in 1910 and 1911. It was the first car engineered by Oldsmobile after it became a division of GM and began sharing a platform with the Buick Model 10. It became the entry-level model for Oldsmobile, replacing the discontinued 1909 Model 20 and the 1909 Model D, while Oakland Motor Car Company became GM's entry level brand as Chevrolet didn't join GM until 1917.

== History ==
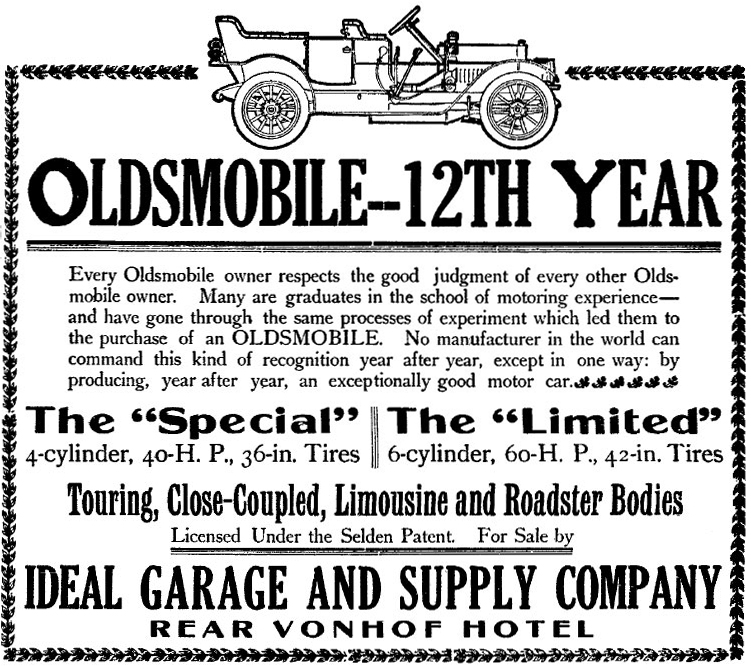
1910 Oldsmobile Special and Limited advertisement

The Series 22 Special was equipped with a side-valve, inline 336 cu in (5,506 cc) four-cylinder engine developing 40 bhp. The engine was installed in the front, driving the rear wheels through a transmission shaft. The gearbox had three forward gears, with the gearshift lever positioned to the right of the driver.

The brake pedal came into contact with the drum brake on the rear wheels. The Series 22 had a wheelbase of 118 in (2,997 mm) and was offered as a 5 passenger touring car, 4-door landaulet or 4-door sedan. The previously offered 2-door roadster was now given its own designation called the Series 25.

1,525 Series 22 were manufactured in 1910, and 1000 were built in 1911. It was replaced in 1912 by the Series 40, in touring car and roadster body styles.

== See also ==
- Cadillac Model Thirty
- Buick Model 10
- Oakland Four
- List of Oldsmobile vehicles
