= Oldsmobile Alero =

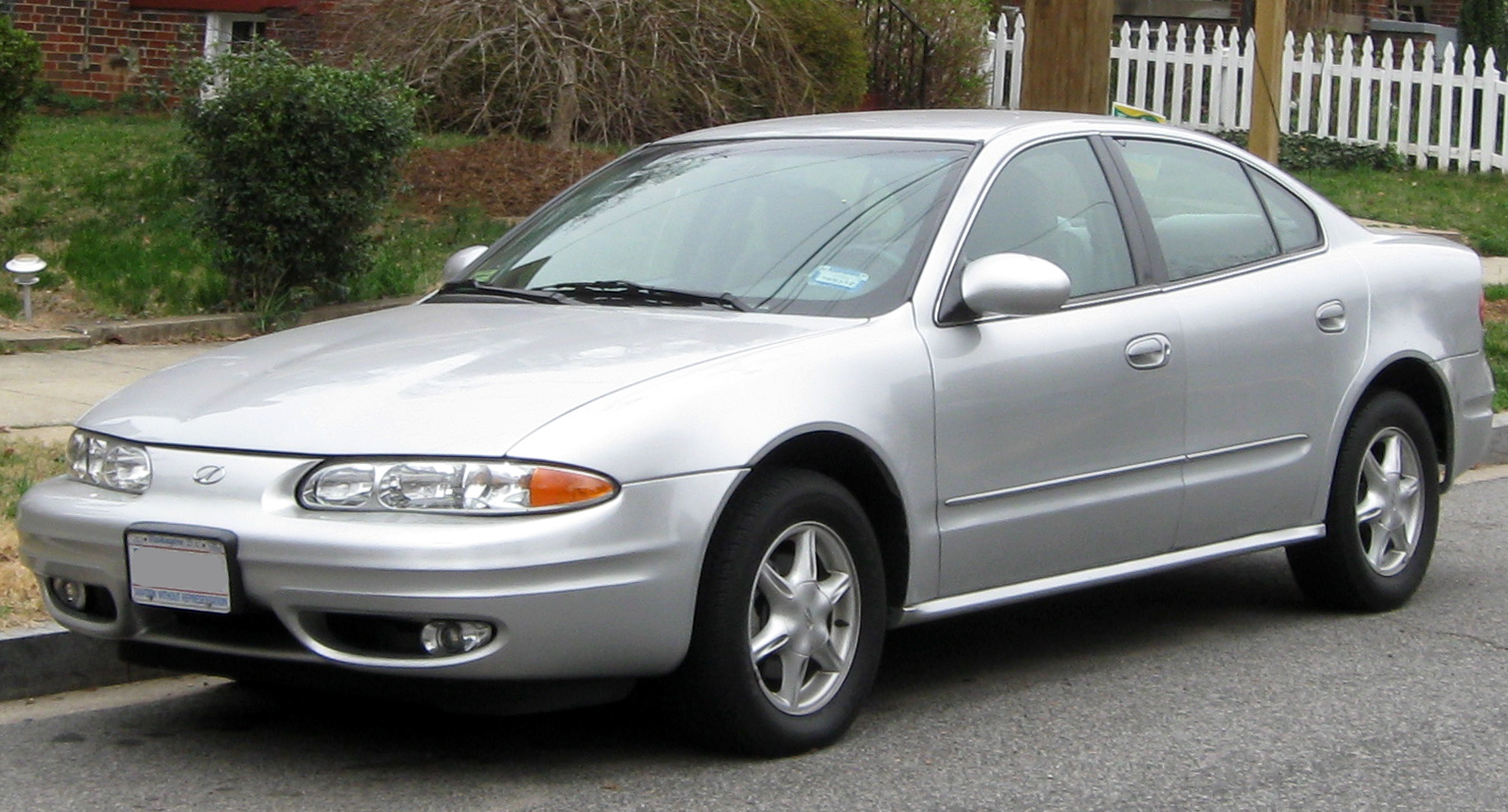

Overview
- Manufacturer: Oldsmobile (General Motors)
- Also called: Chevrolet Alero (Europe and Israel)
- Production: April 1998 – April 29, 2004
- Model years: 1999–2004
- Assembly: United States: Lansing, Michigan (Lansing Car Assembly)
- Designer: Dave Lyon

Body and chassis
- Class: Compact car
- Body style: 2-door coupe 4-door sedan
- Layout: Transverse front-engine, front-wheel drive
- Platform: N-body/GMX130
- Related: Chevrolet Malibu; Oldsmobile Cutlass; Pontiac Grand Am

Powertrain
- Engine: 2.2 L Ecotec L61 I4; 2.4 L LD9 I4; 3.4 L LA1 V6
- Transmission: 5-Speed Getrag F23 manual 4-speed 4T40-E automatic 4-speed 4T45-E automatic

Dimensions
- Wheelbase: 107 in (2,718 mm)
- Length: 186.7 in (4,742 mm)
- Width: 70.1 in (1,781 mm)
- Height: 54.5 in (1,384 mm)
- Curb weight: 2,997–3,124 pounds (1,359–1,417 kg)

Chronology
- Predecessor: Oldsmobile Achieva
- Successor: Chevrolet Evanda (export models)

The Oldsmobile Alero is a compact car that was produced by General Motors for its Oldsmobile division. Introduced in 1998 as a 1999 model, the Alero was the replacement for both the Achieva and Cutlass. The Alero was Oldsmobile's last new model nameplate, and — on April 29, 2004 — was also the last Oldsmobile manufactured.

== History ==
The design of the Alero was originally previewed in 1997 with the Alero Alpha concept car, a V6-powered sport coupe that featured many design elements seen in the production Alero as well as some that were never meant for production. Its appearance was a revival of "coke bottle styling", popular during the 1960s and 1970s.

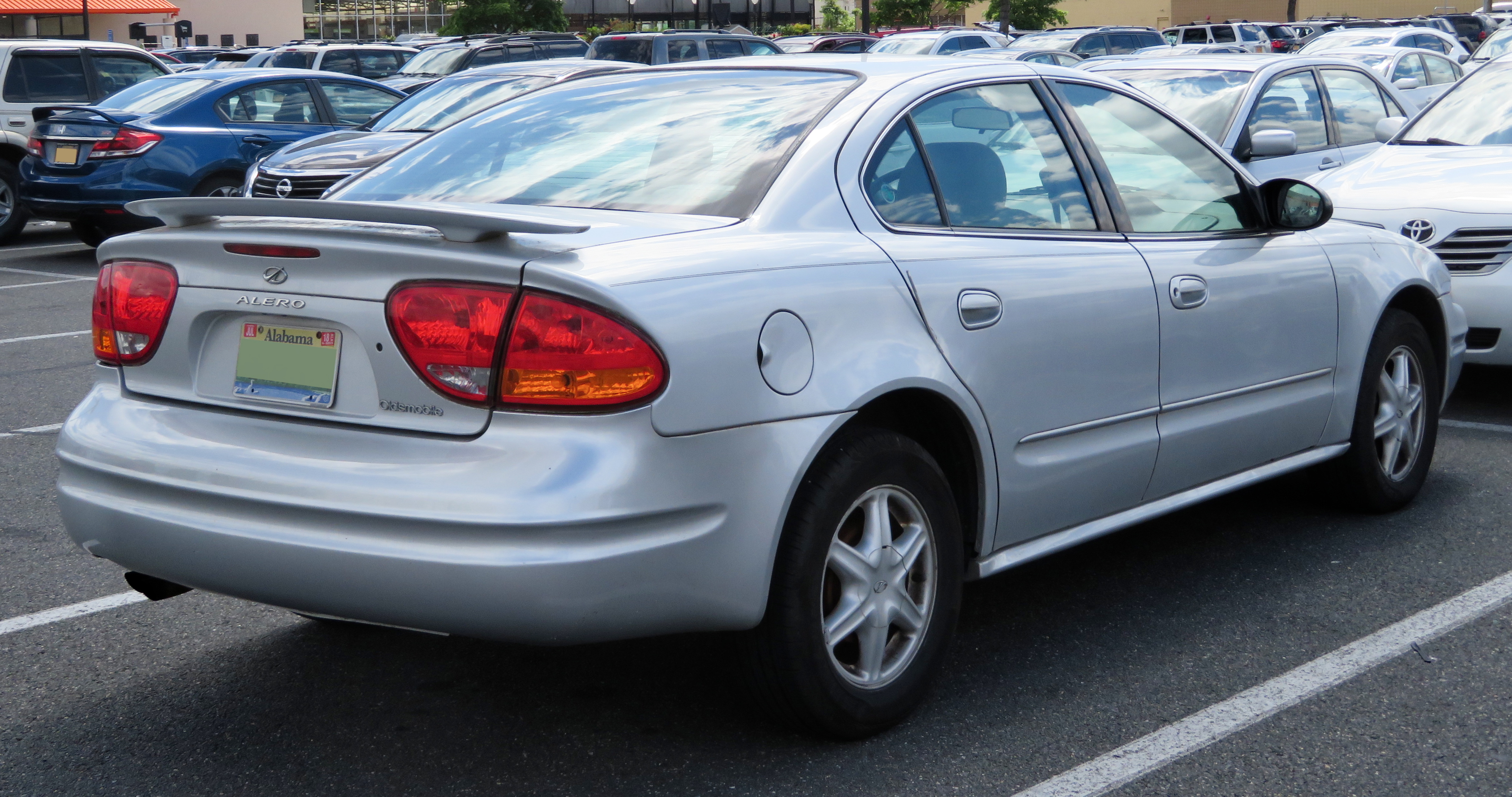
Oldsmobile Alero sedan rear

The Alero was sold either as a 4-door sedan or as a 2-door coupe. It shared its chassis and many parts, including engines, with the Pontiac Grand Am. All Aleros came in base GX, mid-level GL, or high-end GLS trim; the GL trim was split into three levels: 1, 2, and 3.

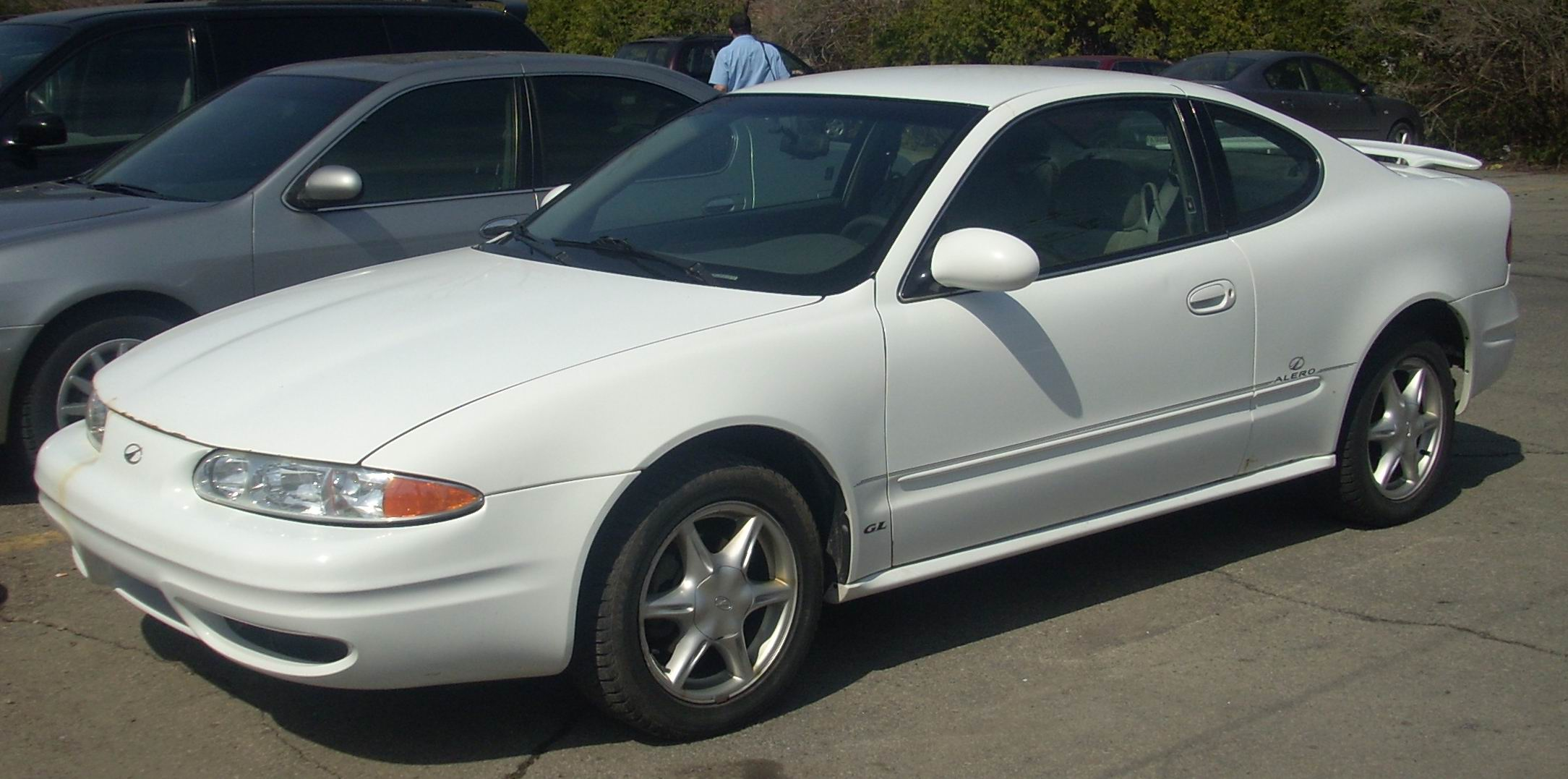
Oldsmobile Alero coupe

The Alero experienced minimal changes during its 5-year run. Most of these changes were either in choice of engines or options. In 2003, the Alero's daytime running lights were changed from high-beam to low-beam.

The Alero's production ended with a special Final 500 Edition. These last 500 Aleros featured custom logos inspired by vintage Oldsmobile logos, dark cherry metallic paint, and a plate featuring the car's number out of 500. The final Alero Final 500 Edition (#500 of 500), a GLS 4-door, also happened to be the final Oldsmobile ever built, and was signed under its hood by the employees of the General Motors Lansing plant. The final car left the Lansing Assembly Plant on April 29, 2004, and was then given to the R.E. Olds Transportation Museum. On December 15, 2017, this car was sold at auction for $42,000 to a dealer in Florida.

A preview of the planned replacement for the Alero was seen in 2001 with the unveiling of the Oldsmobile O4 concept, designed by Bertone. The car was an open-top 4-seater with European styling featuring some Oldsmobile traits, and powered by the latest Ecotec I4 engine. The name had multiple meanings, including "Oldsmobile 4-Seater" as well as implying 2004 as a planned date for production.

However, the O4 concept was unveiled a few weeks after General Motors announced that they would be phasing out the Oldsmobile brand, meaning that production possibilities of the O4 would never be realized. Because of this, a second generation Alero was never built and the car was phased out with the Oldsmobile brand in 2004.

=== Export markets ===
The Alero was also sold in select countries in Europe and in Israel between 1999 and 2001 as the Chevrolet Alero, and was only available as a sedan. The car still featured its Oldsmobile badges even though sold under the Chevrolet brand, but since most European consumers would not recognize the Oldsmobile badging, Chevrolet badges were added to the grille and rear fascia for the 2000 model year. The Alero featured Chevrolet emblems throughout its entire run in Israel. The Alero was replaced in Europe, Israel, and Canada by the GM Daewoo-sourced Chevrolet Evanda.

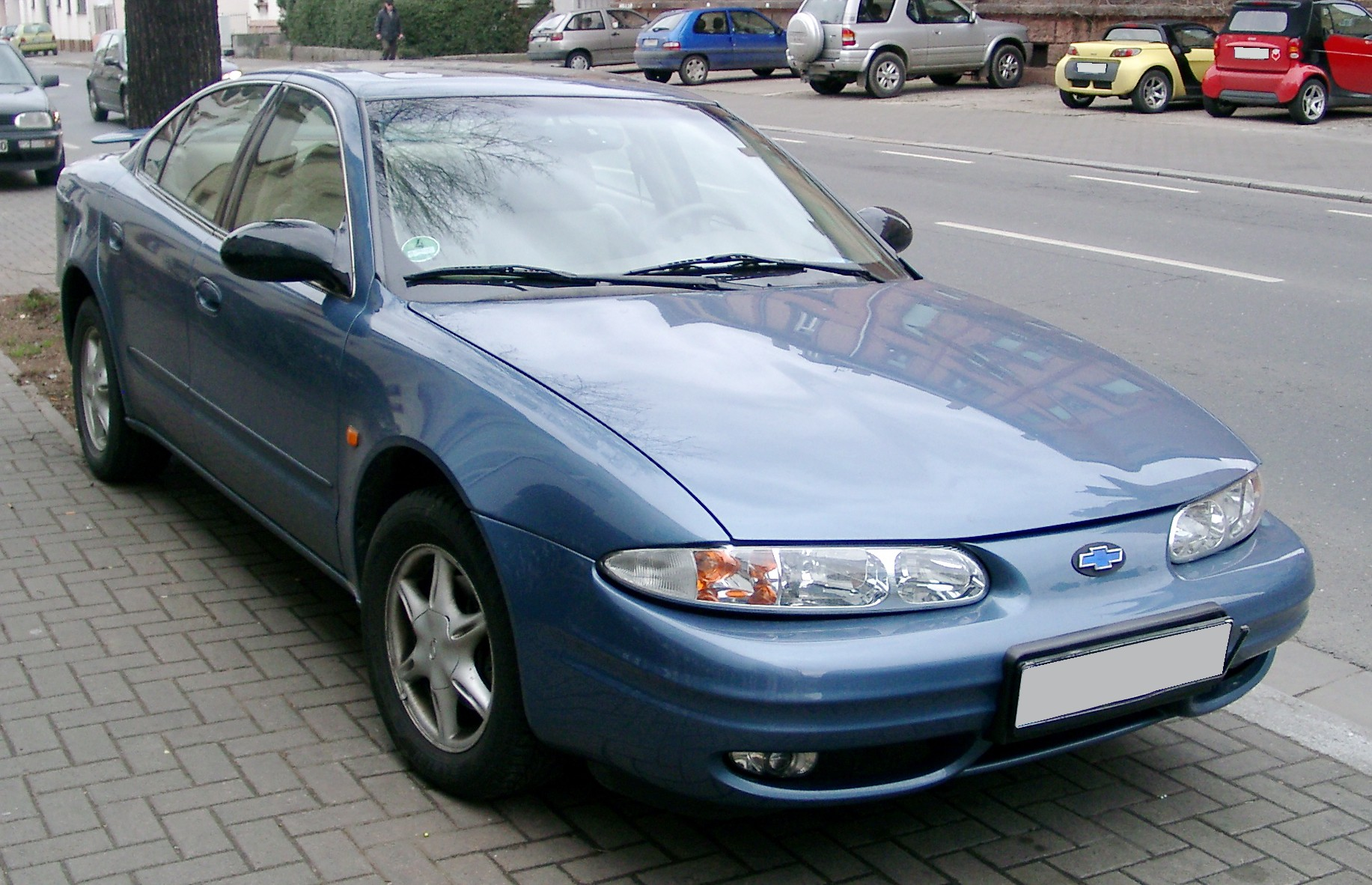
Chevrolet Alero (Europe)

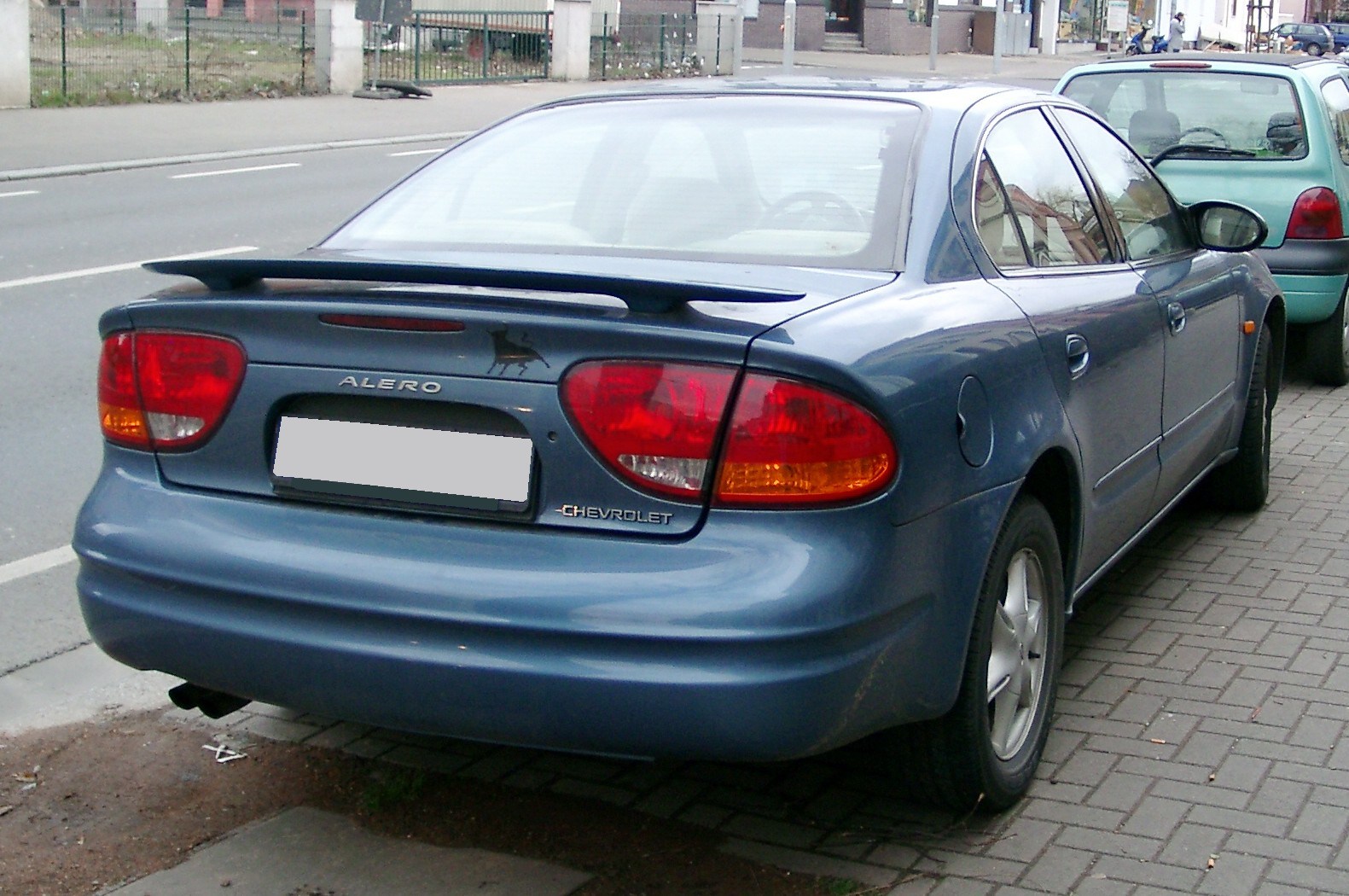
Chevrolet Alero (rear view)

== Trim levels ==
During its production, the Alero was available in four trim levels, all available in coupe or sedan body styles:

The GX was the most basic trim level of the Alero. It included such features as a 2.4 L inline four-cylinder engine, 5-speed manual transmission, an AM/FM stereo (later, AM/FM stereo with single-disc CD player) with a four-speaker sound system, 15-inch black-painted steel wheels with decorative wheel covers, manual windows, power door locks, full instrumentation, air conditioning, velour door panel inserts, and cloth seating surfaces. The 3.4 L V6 engine available on all other Alero trim levels was not available on the base GX trim level.

The GL was the midrange trim level of the Alero. It added the following features to the base GX trim level: an AM/FM stereo with cassette player (not applicable for later models), power windows, and 16-inch alloy wheels. The 3.4 L V6 engine was available as an option, though was standard equipment on the GL2 trim level. The GL1 trim level also offered the V6 engine option.

The GLS trim level was the "luxury" trim level of the Alero. It added the following features to the already well-equipped GL trim level: an AM/FM stereo with cassette and single-disc CD player (later, an MP3-decoding single-disc CD player was added), an eight-speaker "premium" sound system with amplifier, keyless entry, power driver seat, leather upholstery and a security system. The 3.4 L V6 engine was standard for this trim level.

== Engines ==
Years	Engine	Power	Torque
2002–2004	2.2 L Ecotec L61 I4	140 hp (104 kW)	150 lb⋅ft (203 N⋅m)
1999–2001	2.4 L LD9 I4	150 hp (112 kW)	155 lb⋅ft (210 N⋅m)
1999–2004	3.4 L LA1 V6	170 hp (127 kW)	200 lb⋅ft (271 N⋅m)

== Variant prototypes ==
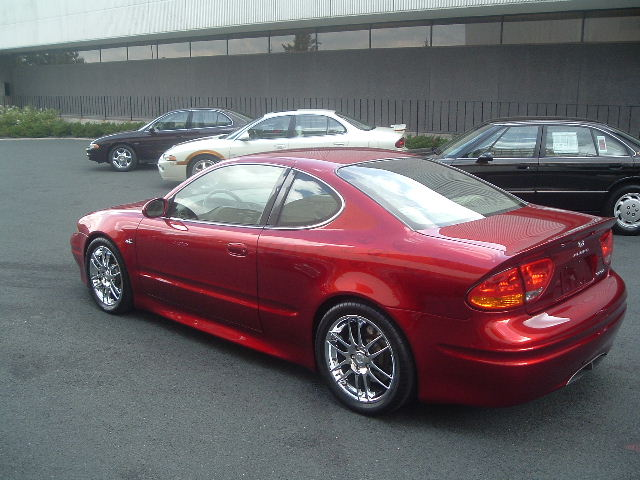
Oldsmobile Alero OSV

General Motors commissioned the construction of Alero prototypes either for testing or to gather public opinion on possible future plans for the Alero. These variants include:

- Alero OSV - "Oldsmobile Speciality Vehicle", an experiment in an aftermarket parts brand for Oldsmobile. Based on the coupe it featured a custom body kit, a supercharged four-cylinder engine, custom interior, and special cherry red paint with ghosted Oldsmobile emblems in the rear quarter panels.
- Alero OSV II - Another experimental vehicle, this time featuring an LX5 DOHC 3.5 L V6 (used in the Oldsmobile Intrigue and Aurora) and featured custom dark green paint.
- Alero 442 - A set of show cars based on the Alero coupe fitted with a body kit similar in design to the Oldsmobile 442. Each Alero 442 show car had a unique color, including white with gold stripes and white with pink stripes.
- Alero California - A custom built version of the Alero coupe featuring parts including a large rear wing, racing seats, sport tires, and custom graphics painted in brown and yellow.
- Alero Convertible - An experiment in the possibility of creating an Alero with a convertible soft top to help broaden the appeal of the car to young buyers. The Oldsmobile O4 concept also hinted that the next generation Alero could have had a convertible model.
- Alero Pace Car - Built by General Motors as part of their fleet of Oldsmobile safety cars for the Indy Racing League, featuring custom yellow, blue and white checkered flag graphics.

== Safety ==
The Insurance Institute for Highway Safety (IIHS) gave the 1999–2005 Grand Am (which was built on the same platform as the 1999–2004 Alero) a Poor rating in its frontal crash test for its marginal structural integrity, a possible head injury, a potential right leg injury, and poor dummy control.

The following are 2003 National Highway Traffic Safety Administration (NHTSA) crash test ratings for the Alero.

Coupe

- Frontal driver:
- Frontal passenger:
- Side driver:
- Side rear passenger:
- Rollover:

Sedan

- Frontal driver:
- Frontal passenger:
- Side driver:
- Side rear passenger:
- Rollover:

== Sales ==
Year	Sales
1999	142,242
2000	137,140
2001	129,726
2002	98,979
2003	109,773
2004	79,796
