= Oldsmobile O4 =

Overview
- Manufacturer: Oldsmobile (General Motors)
- Also called: GM O4 (after the brand was phased out)
- Production: 2001 (concept car)

Body and chassis
- Class: Sport compact car
- Body style: 4-door convertible
- Layout: Front-engine, front-wheel-drive
- Doors: Suicide doors
- Related: Opel Astra

The Oldsmobile O4 was a front-wheel drive concept car designed by Oldsmobile in 2001. The O4 was a 4-door convertible that was aimed at a younger demographic. The O4 displayed features that would have been included on the next generation Oldsmobile Alero, had it not been cancelled.

== Overview ==
Many of the O4's mechanical components originated from the Opel Astra, a German small family car. The O4 had a 4-cylinder engine that produced 190 hp (142 kW), along with a manual transmission. The roof featured twin targa tops made of carbon fiber that could be stowed behind the rear passenger seats. In addition, the rear window retracted into a compartment located behind the rear passenger seats. The Oldsmobile O4's doors have a manner of front conventional doors and rear small suicide doors.

The O4 was also noted for its "info ring" which replaced the traditional instrument cluster. The info ring was inspired by the Palm Pilot and similar devices. The "info ring" had 10 switches that operated all of its functions. Media and other information such as movies, maps, and telephone numbers were able to be stored and displayed via Sony memory stick. The O4 was also equipped with General Motors' OnStar service.

== Namesake ==
The "O" in O4 stood for "Oxygen" while the "4" represented the car's seating capacity.

== Doors ==
The Oldsmobile O4's doors open in a manner of front conventional doors and rear small suicide doors. The Oldsmobile O4 has 2 silver door handles on the front doors while it does not have door handles for the rear doors.

== Cancellation ==
Just weeks before the O4's unveiling, General Motors announced its phasing out of the Oldsmobile brand. By the time of the O4's unveiling, the O4 was called the GM O4, with the "Oldsmobile" marque removed.
