= Oldsmobile Recon =

Overview
- Manufacturer: Oldsmobile (General Motors)
- Production: 1999 (Concept car)

Body and chassis
- Class: Compact crossover SUV
- Body style: 5-door SUV
- Layout: Front-engine, all-wheel-drive
- Related: Saturn Vue

Powertrain
- Engine: 3.0L V6

The Oldsmobile Recon was a 1999 concept car built by Oldsmobile. It was a compact crossover SUV that featured 5 doors, 5 seats, a dual panel panoramic sunroof and rear suicide doors. Another unique feature was a reconfigurable instrument panel. The Recon was all-wheel-drive. It also featured a 3.0L V6 engine. The Recon never became a production model; the most likely reason is Oldsmobile's discontinuation in 2004. However, GM's first true compact SUV, the 2002 Saturn Vue does bear a slight resemblance to the Recon.
