= Oldsmobile Alero Alpha =

Concept Vehicle

The Oldsmobile Alero Alpha was a 1997 concept car built by Oldsmobile. The Alero Alpha was a 2-door coupe and its design was inspired by the earlier Tube Car and Antares concepts, as well as the Aurora production car. Many of its design elements were seen in the 1999 production version, which was simply called "Alero". Like the Alero Alpha, the Alero was available as a 2-door coupe, plus a 4-door sedan. The Sedan Version was sold under the Chevrolet Brand in several European countries and in Israel.
