= Oldsmobile Expression =

Concept car

The Oldsmobile Expression was a 1990 concept vehicle built by Oldsmobile. The Expression was a 4-door wagon that featured fiberglass exterior panels and 6 passenger (2+2+2) seating. Among other features showcased were: rain-sensing windshield wipers, in-car vacuum cleaner, TV/VCR with a built in Nintendo Entertainment System, and unique four-wheel steering.
