= Buick Four =

Car model

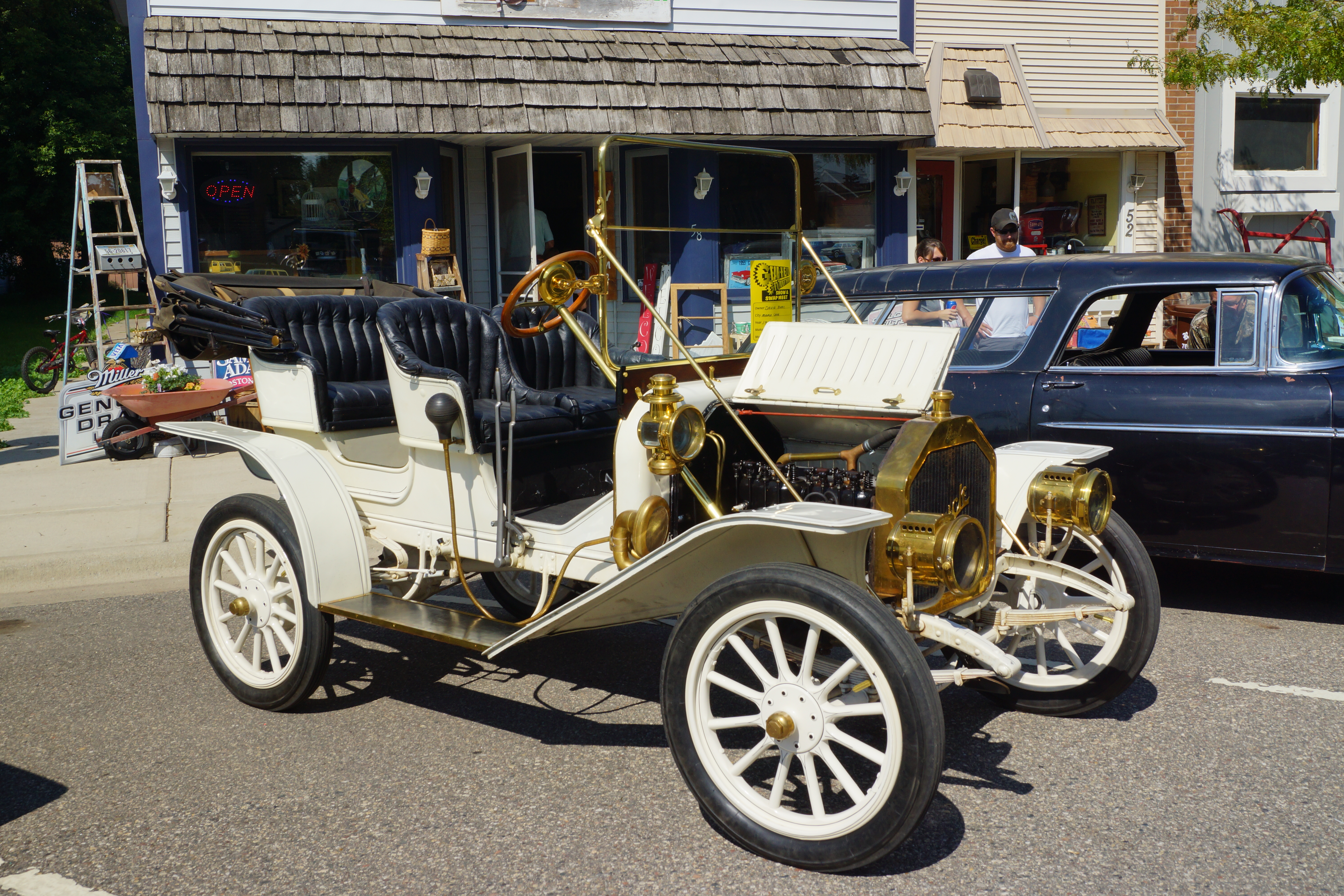
- 1909 Buick Model 10

Overview
- Manufacturer: Buick (General Motors)
- Model years: 1909–1918
- Assembly: United States: Flint, Michigan (Flint Wagon Works)

Body and chassis
- Class: Luxury car
- Layout: Front-engine, rear-wheel-drive
- Related: Janney Automobile

Powertrain
- Engine: 165 cu in (2.7 L) Buick Straight-four engine OHV
- Transmission: 3-speed synchromesh manual

Dimensions
- Wheelbase: 92 in (2,337 mm); 165 in (4,191 mm)

Chronology
- Predecessor: Buick Model B
- Successor: Buick Six

The Buick 4 was a series of passenger cars produced by the Buick Division of GM from 1909 through 1918, and was available as a touring car, phaeton or roadster. It was available with the Buick Model B as a larger alternative offering a larger engine and better durability. It became the junior sedan in 1914 when the Buick Six was introduced.

== History ==
The Model 10 (1908–1910) was equipped with an overhead valve, in-line 165 cu in (2,703 cc) four-cylinder engine developing 40 bhp. The engine was installed in the front, driving the rear wheels through a transmission shaft. The gearbox had three forward gears, with the gearshift lever positioned to the right of the driver. The brake pedal came into contact with the Drum brake on the rear wheels. The Model 10 had a wheelbase of 88 in (2,235 mm) and was offered as a 5-passenger touring car, 4-door landaulet or 4-door sedan, manufacturing 23,100. The Model 10 was an improvement of the previously developed car made by Janney Motor Company and acquired by Buick. The Model 32 (roadster) and Model 33 (touring car) were built in 1911. The only changes were the wheelbases at 89 in (2,261 mm) for the roadster and 100 in (2,540 mm) for the touring car. 1,150 Model 32 and 2,000 Model 33 were manufactured. It had a listed retail price of US$1,000 ($34,554 in 2025 dollars).

The Model 34 (short wheel base roadster) 91 in (2,305 mm), Model 35 (long wheelbase touring car) at 102 in (2,584 mm), and Model 36 (long wheelbase roadster) were manufactured in 1912, with 1,400 Model 34, 6,050 Model 35 and 1,600 Model 36.

The 1913 Model 24 roadster replaced the previous Model 34 and 36, while the Model 25 replaced the Model 35 touring sedan, and shared a wheelbase at 105 in (2,667 mm), while the mechanicals were unchanged from previous years, producing 2,850 Model 24 and 8,150 Model 25.

The model designations changed again for 1914, now identified as the B-24 roadster and B-25 Touring sedan, with 3,126 B-24 roadsters and 13,446 B-25 assembled, while the dimensions and mechanical features unchanged, aside from a standard folding windshield.

For 1915, the roadster was the C-24 and the touring sedan was the C-25, manufacturing stayed the same while 3,256 C-24 roadsters and 19,080 C-25 touring cars were built.

The Buick Four series was discontinued in 1918, revised for 1922, 23 and 24, and dropped again. The next Buick offering with a four-cylinder engine was the 1980 Buick Skylark, which had a four-cylinder engine as an option.

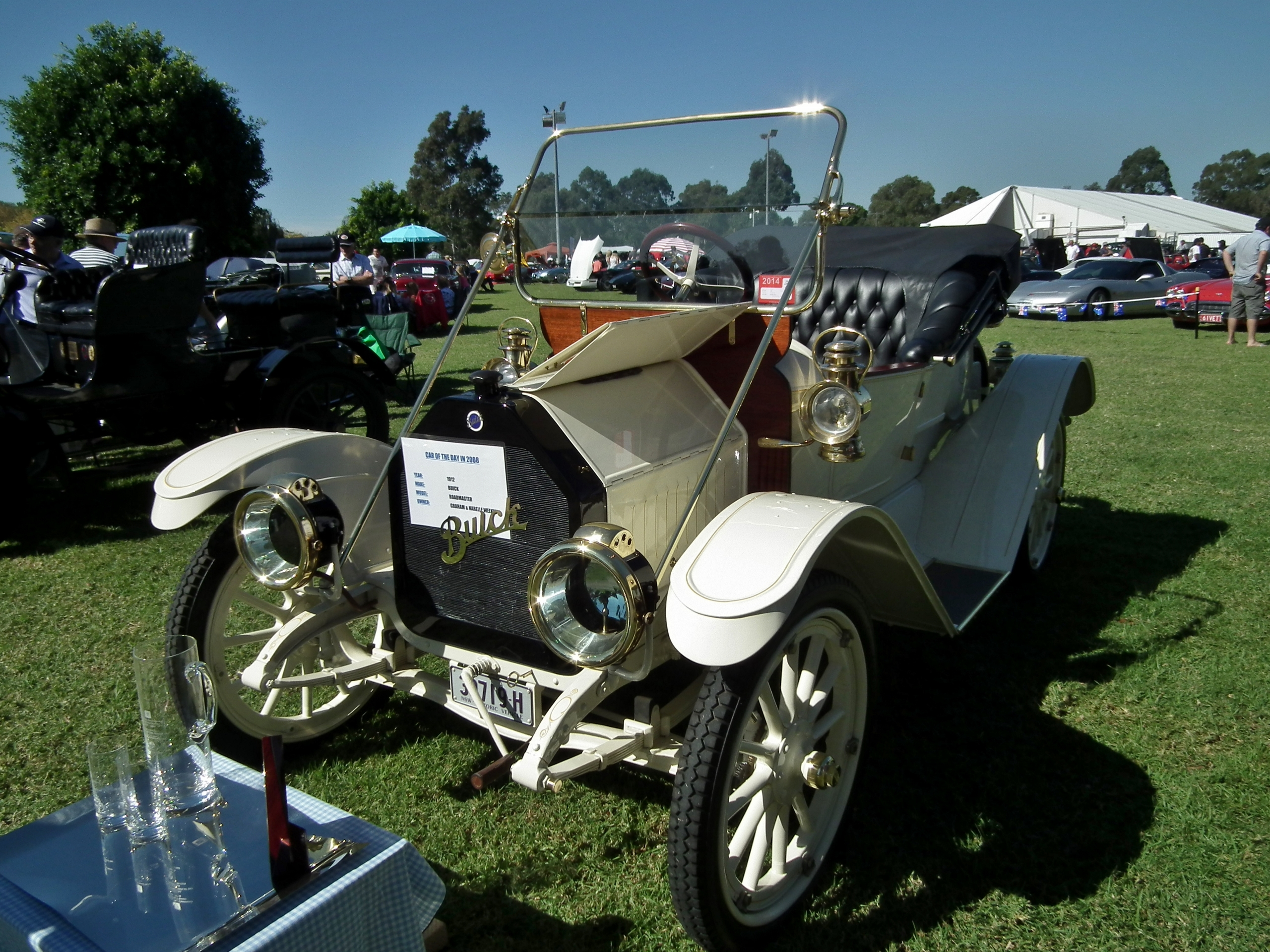
1912 Buick Model 36 roadster

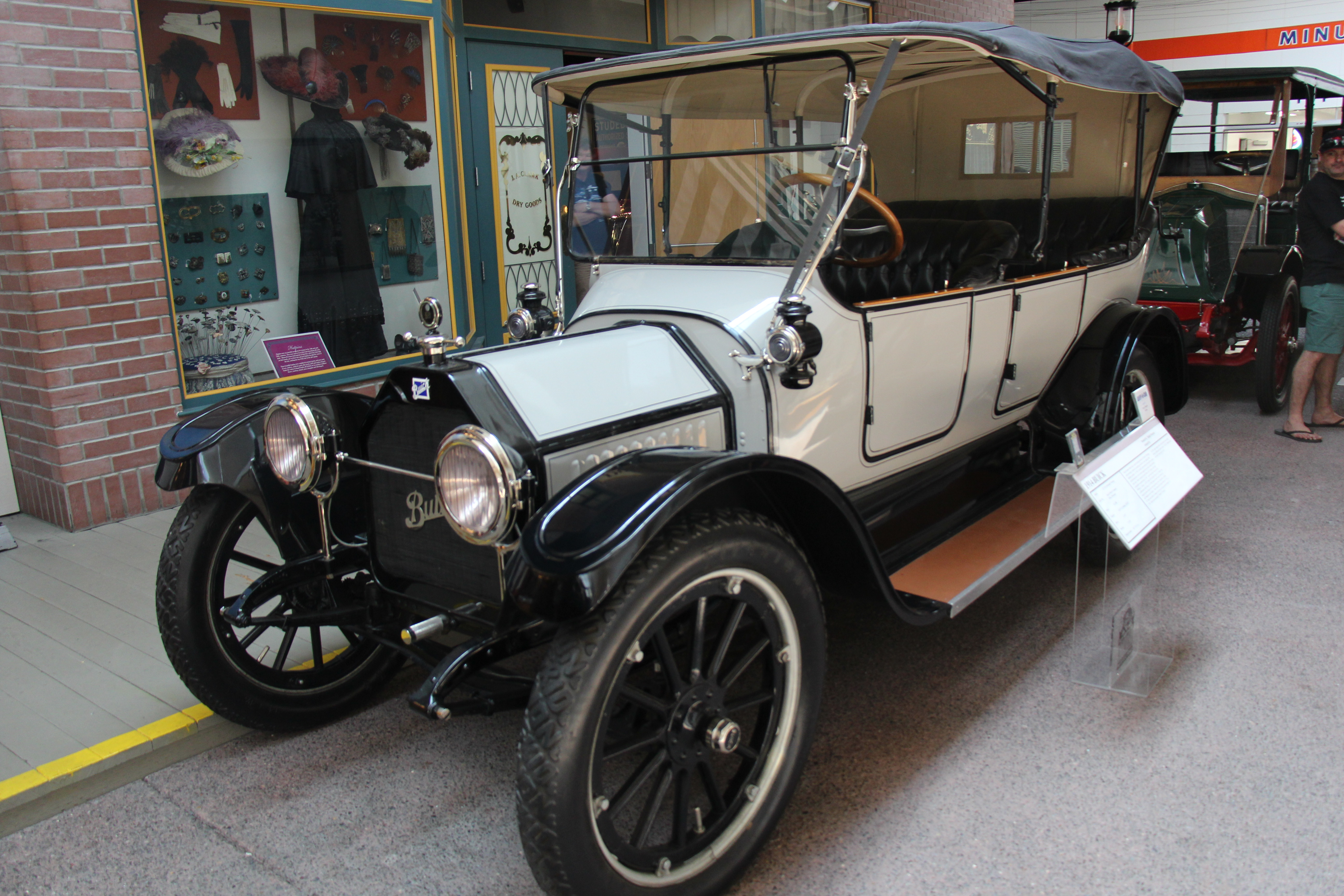
1914 Buick Model B-25 Touring Sedan

== See also ==
- List of Buick vehicles
- Cadillac Model Thirty
- Oldsmobile Series 22
- Oakland
