= Oldsmobile Series 60 =

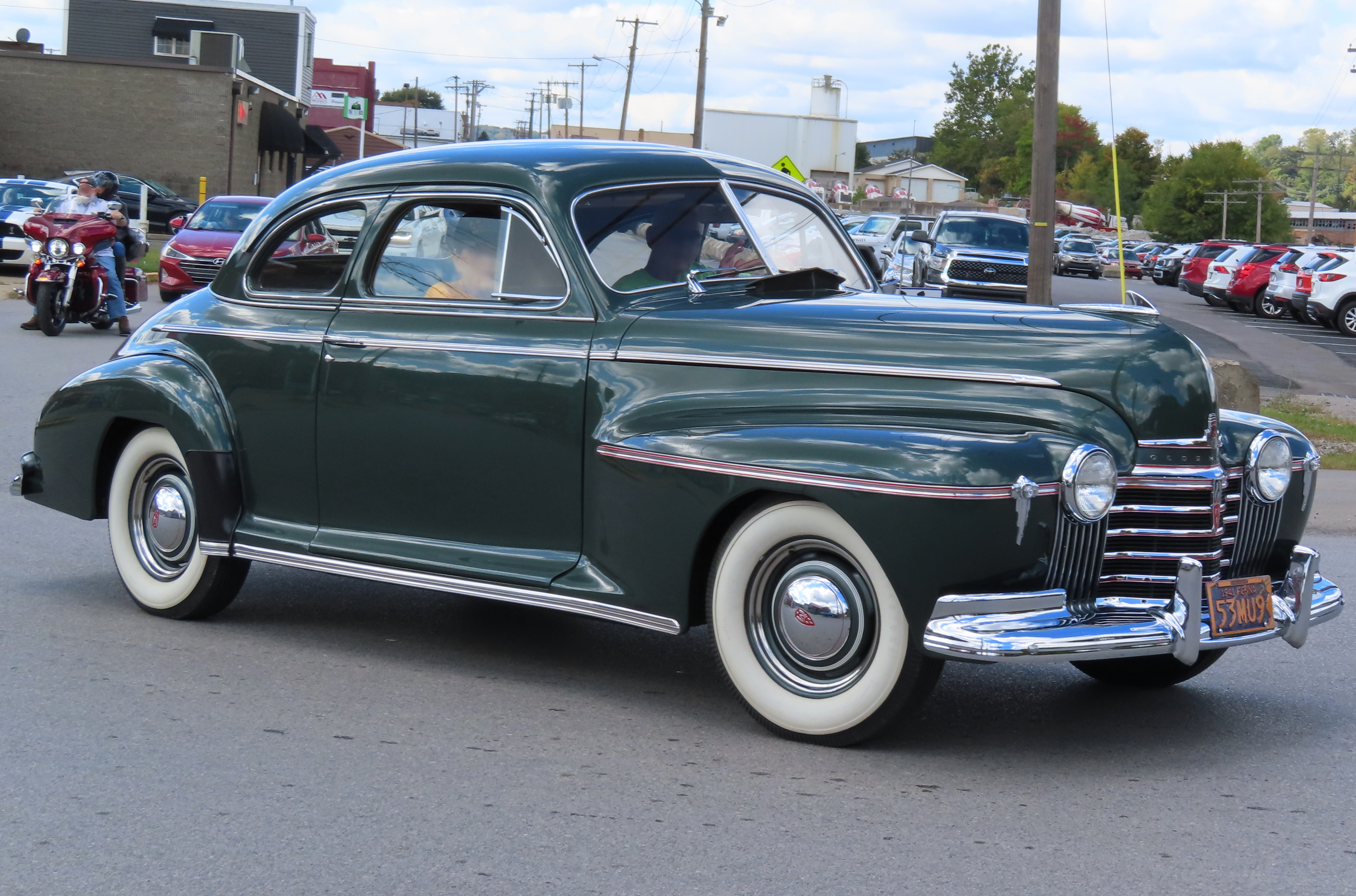
- 1941 Oldsmobile Special 66 Club Coupe

Overview
- Manufacturer: Oldsmobile (General Motors)
- Production: 1938–1948

Body and chassis
- Class: Full-size car
- Layout: FR layout
- Platform: A-body

Chronology
- Predecessor: Oldsmobile F-Series 60
- Successor: Oldsmobile Omega (entry-level product)

The Series 60 "Special" is a full-size car made by Oldsmobile from the 1939 through the 1948 model years. It was their entry-level model using the GM "A" body platform, giving Oldsmobile an entry-level product with more standard features that would be optional on Chevrolet and Pontiac vehicles using the same platform. Initially, the engine size used was the company's flat head 6 cylinder, while senior models would use the flat head 8 cylinder. For marketing purposes, the Oldsmobile Series 60, or the Oldsmobile 66, took advantage of the national highway U.S. Route 66 established in 1926. It was with this generation that all GM vehicles experienced increased width dimensions to accommodate three passengers on the front bench seat and an additional three passengers on rear bench seat installed vehicles. This was accomplished with the deletion of running board thereby adding additional room inside the passenger compartment and upgrading the floor mounted gearshift to a steering column installed transmission gear selector for the Hydramatic automatic transmission.

== 1939–1940 ==
First generation
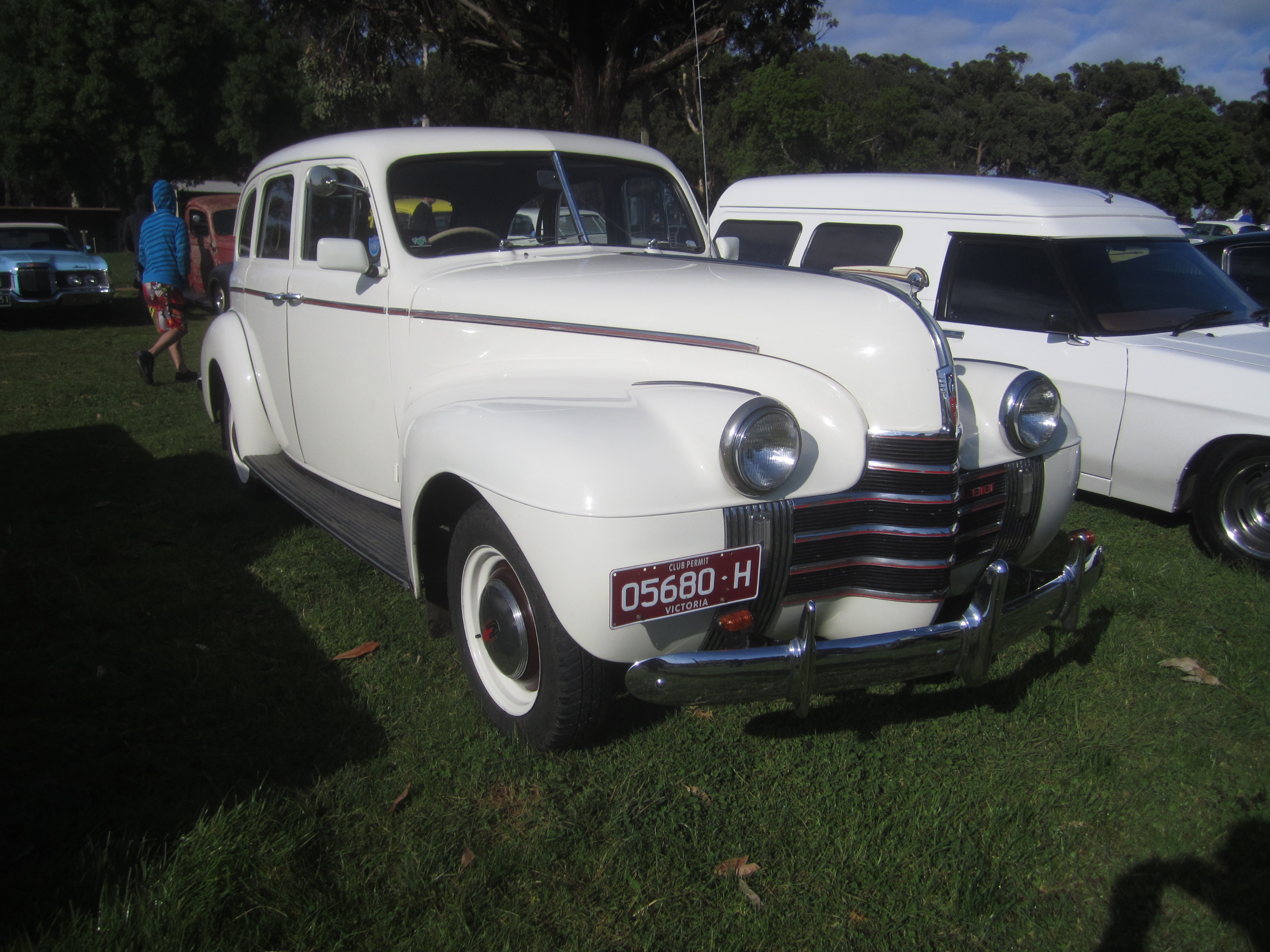
- 1940 Oldsmobile 66 Special Sedan

Overview
- Model years: 1939–1940
- Assembly: (main plant); United States: Lansing, Michigan (Lansing Car Assembly) (branch assembly); Linden, New Jersey; South Gate, California; Osaka, Japan
- Designer: Harley Earl

Body and chassis
- Body style: 2-door business coupe 2-door club coupe 2-door sedan coupe 4-door sedan 2-door convertible 4-door station wagon
- Platform: A-body
- Related: Pontiac Deluxe; Chevrolet Special Deluxe; Chevrolet Master Deluxe; Chevrolet Master 85

Powertrain
- Engine: 215 cu in (3.5 L) Oldsmobile I6; 230 cu in (3.8 L) Oldsmobile I6
- Transmission: 3-speed synchromesh manual 4-speed Hydra-Matic automatic

Dimensions
- Wheelbase: 1939: 115.0 in (2,921 mm); 1940: 116.0 in (2,946 mm)
- Length: 1939: 189.0 in (4,801 mm); 1940: 197.8 in (5,024 mm)
- Height: 1939: 66.0 in (1,676 mm); 1940: 65.0 in (1,651 mm)
- Curb weight: 3,100–3,700 lb (1,400–1,700 kg)

Naming standards were in flux at Oldsmobile during the late 1930s and 1940s. From 1932 through 1938 Oldsmobile had two series: "F" and "L". The Series F came with a straight-six engine and the Series L came with a longer body and a straight-eight engine. The Series F was replaced by the Series 60 in 1939 and the Series L was replaced with the Series 70, with the Series 70 being powered by the straight-six and the straight-eight respectively. The Series 60 used the GM A-body and the Series 70 used the B-body. The Series 60 also shared a naming convention with the more upscale Buick Series 40, also called the Buick Special as the entry-level product for Buick.

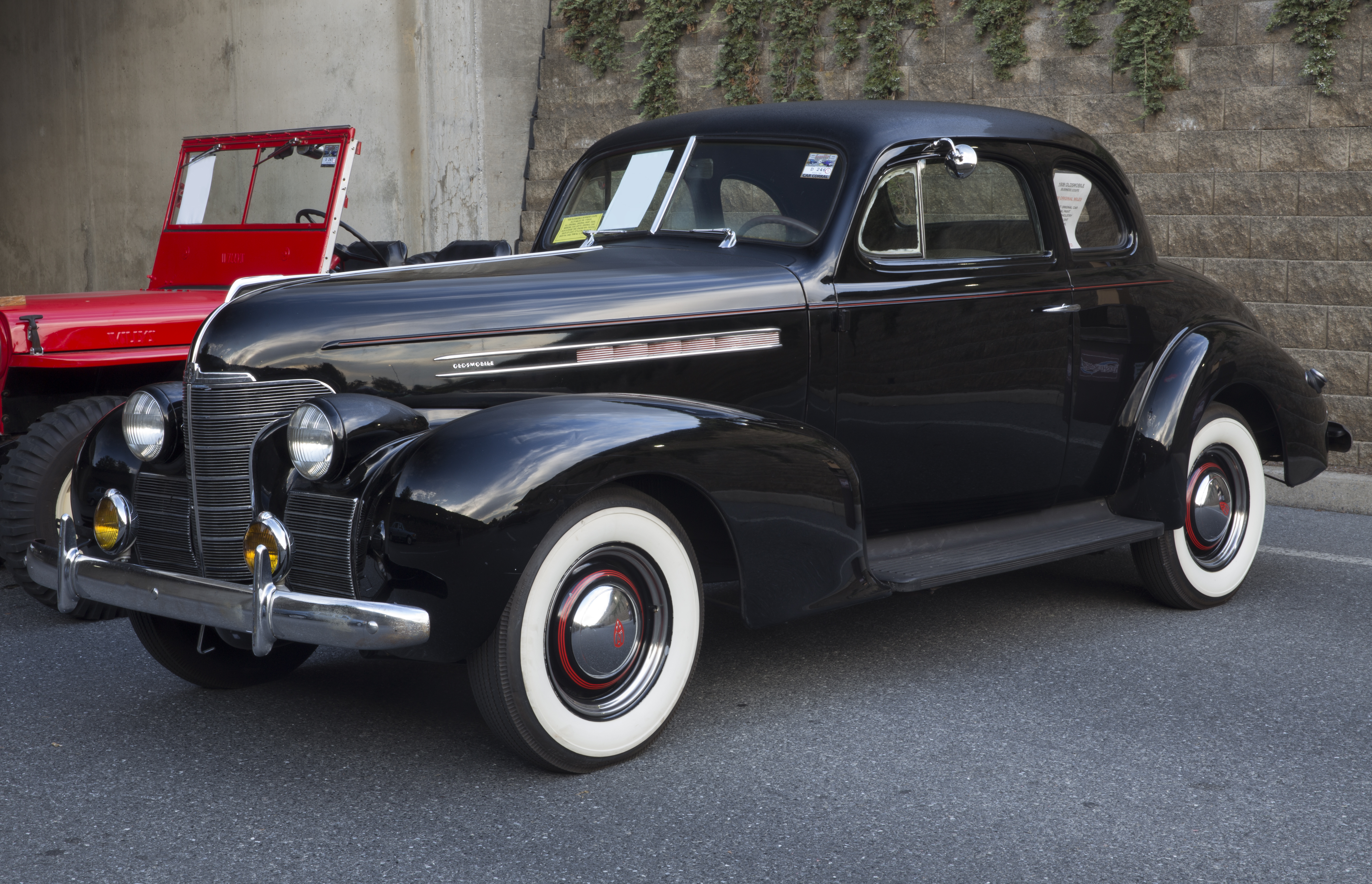
1939 Oldsmobile 66 Special Business Coupe

The Series 60 occupied the entry-level position for Oldsmobiles sold in the United States from 1939 through the 1948 model years. They were trimmed in an entry-level fashion and, in parts and components, the Series 60 models were closely related to Chevrolets and Pontiacs. Naming conventions used by GM since the 1910s for all divisions used alphanumeric designations that changed every year. Oldsmobile starting after the war changed their designations and standardized them so that the first number signified the chassis platform, while the second number signified how many cylinders.

The 1939 Oldsmobiles were available with the "Automatic Safety Transmission", and was a semi-automatic, in that it still used a clutch to engage the planetary gearbox and then shifted automatically. The Hydramatic transmission, a fully clutch-less automatic transmission, debuted in the 1940 model year.

In 1939, four body styles were available: a business coupe with no rear seat, a club coupe with two rear fold-away jump seats, a two-door sedan with a full rear seat and a four-door sedan which shared its roofline with the two-door sedan. The wheelbase was 115 inches. The backs of the front seats were rounded and padded for protection of the rear seat occupants. A 216CID 90 hp (67 kW) I6 was used.

In 1940, the even larger C-body was introduced to Oldsmobile and it alone was powered by the straight-eight. In order to differentiate it from the previous year's Series 80 it was named the Series 90 (there was no Series 80 that year). The series were also given names for the first time that year with the Series 60, 70, and 90 being called the Special, Dynamic, and Custom Cruiser respectively.

Two body styles were added to the model line up in 1940: a two-door convertible and a four-door station wagon with an optional wooden body showing 633 were manufactured and a listed retail price of US$1,042 ($23,946 in 2025 dollars). In addition, a full rear seat was added to the club coupe, although it still did not share the roofline of the somewhat roomier two-door sedan. A deluxe equipment package was also new that year.

== 1941–1948 ==
Second generation
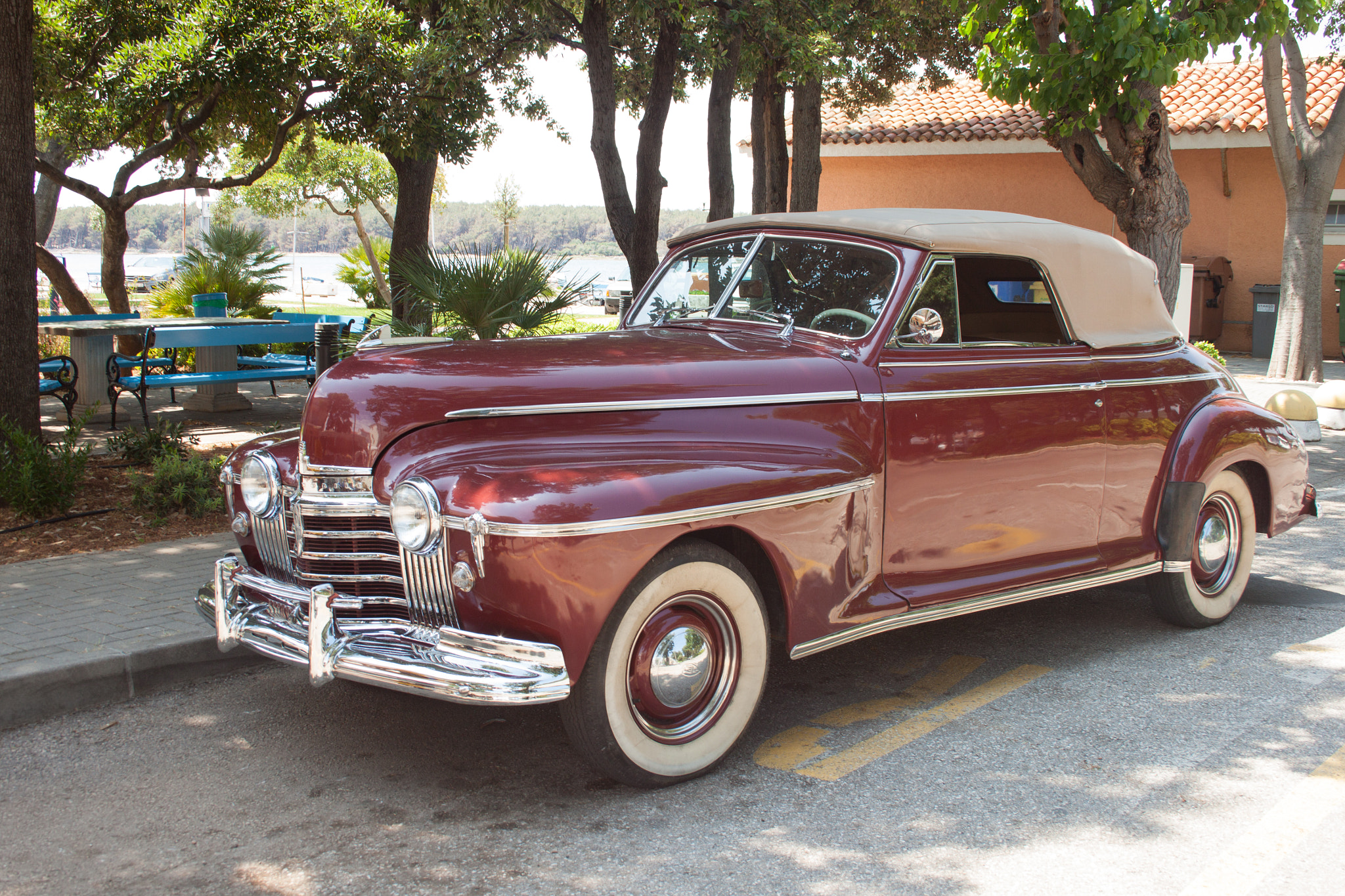
- 1941 Oldsmobile Special Convertible

Overview
- Model years: 1941–1942, 1946-1948
- Assembly: (main plant); United States: Lansing, Michigan (Lansing Car Assembly) (branch assembly); South Gate, California; Kansas City, Kansas; Framingham, Massachusetts; Linden, New Jersey new locations in 1947; Wilmington, Delaware; Atlanta, Georgia; Pagewood, New South Wales
- Designer: Harley Earl

Body and chassis
- Body style: 2-door business coupe 2-door club coupe 2-door sedan coupe 2-door club sedan coupe 4-door sedan 2-door convertible 4-door station wagon
- Layout: FR layout
- Platform: A-body
- Related: Pontiac Torpedo; Chevrolet Special Deluxe; Chevrolet Master Deluxe; Chevrolet Fleetline; Chevrolet Fleetmaster; Chevrolet Stylemaster

Powertrain
- Engine: 238 cu in (3.9 L) Oldsmobile Straight-six engine 257 cu in (4.2 L) Oldsmobile Straight-eight engine
- Transmission: 3-speed synchromesh manual 4-speed Hydra-Matic automatic

Dimensions
- Wheelbase: 119.0 in (3,023 mm)
- Length: 204.0 in (5,182 mm)
- Curb weight: 3,300–4,000 lb (1,500–1,800 kg)

In 1941, both engines were offered on each Oldsmobile series so to differentiate between the two the second digit was used to denote the number of cylinders, so the Special 60 was replaced with the Special 66 and 68'. The only way to get an eight-cylinder engine on the GM A body from 1941 to 1948 was to buy an Oldsmobile Special 68 or a Pontiac Deluxe Torpedo Eight.

In 1941, the Series 60 wheelbase was increased to 119 in. Two models were produced, the 66 which used a 238 in^{3} (3.9 L) straight-six engine and the 68 which used a new 257CID 110 hp (82 kW) (4.2 L) straight-eight. All Series 60s came with a three-speed column shift manual, or the optional four-speed Hydramatic automatic. Both options could be paired with either engine choice. Because of the column shift and new wider runningboard-less "torpedo" styling three passengers could now be accommodated comfortably in front. It used full instrumentation.

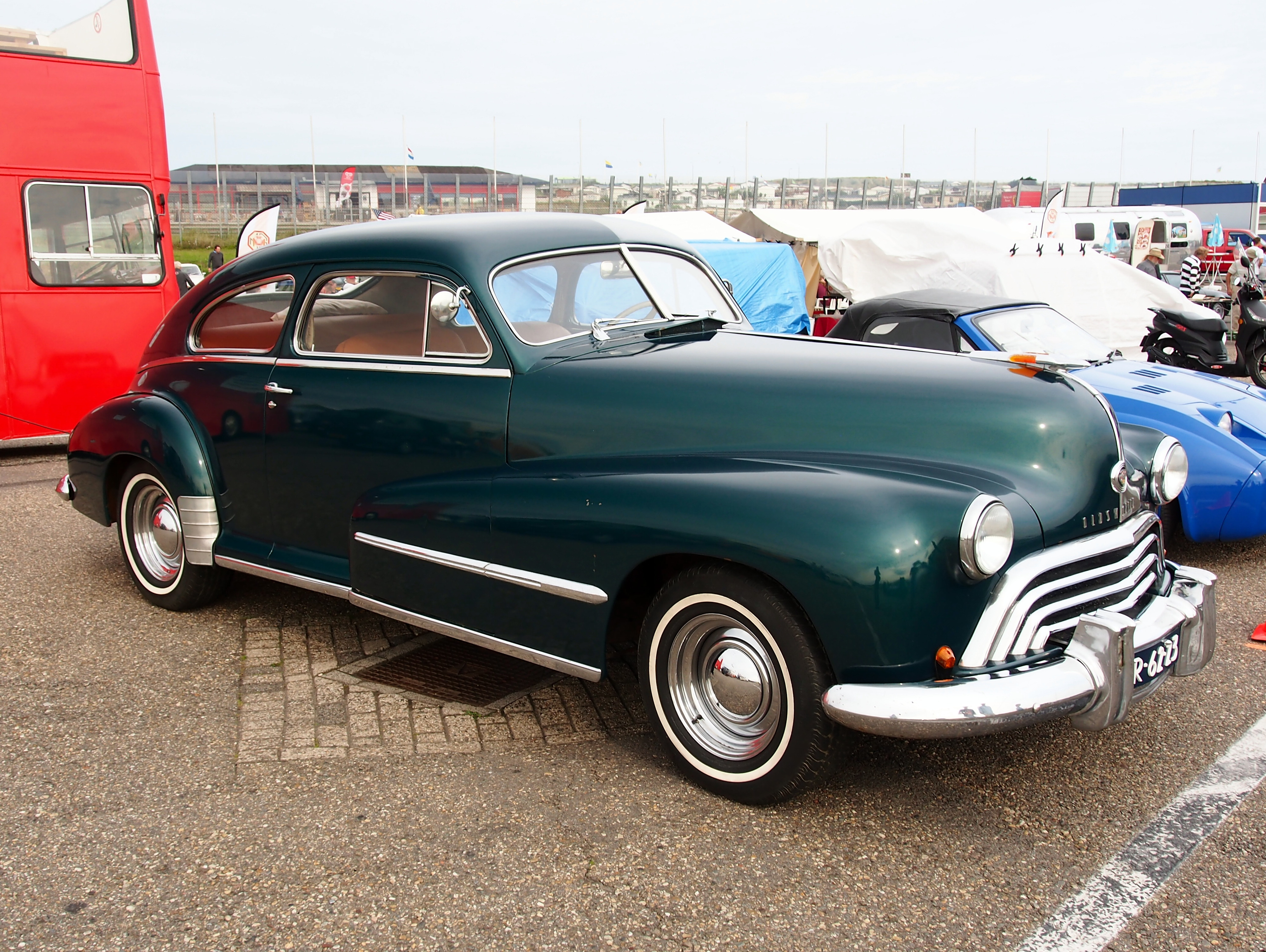
1948 Oldsmobile Club Sedan.

In 1941 the lineup consisted of a three-passenger two-door business coupe without a rear seat, a six-passenger two-door club coupe with a rear seat, a two-door sedan, a four-door "bustle back" sedan which shared its roof line with the two-door sedan, a four-door eight-passenger wood-bodied station wagon and a three-passenger two-door convertible. Except for the convertible and station wagon, all were available in either standard or deluxe trim. The station wagon was listed with a retail price of US$1,176 ($25,742 in 2025 dollars).

In 1942, Oldsmobile stayed with its Special 60 series on the bottom of a three series format. As with all automakers production was halted early in the year due to the war, both a six- or eight-cylinder motor could be ordered. Now extremely rare, both a convertible and a station wagon were available. A new body style was a six-passenger two-door club sedan fastback.

Production was delayed from 1942 until 1945 due to manufacturing efforts being devoted to World War II defense production. Before production was interrupted, to celebrate the company's 44th anniversary at the time, all Oldsmobiles were installed with a small badge on the grille with "B44" attached. This was not a model designation.

In 1946, the Special 60 series was again Oldsmobile's lowest priced group of cars. Special 60s had only six-cylinder power, although the eight-cylinder was offered in other years. The business coupe and the two-door sedan were discontinued. Interiors were a tan mixture pattern cloth. Standard tire size was 6.00 x 16 inches. Leather interiors were offered on convertibles. Technical features included electro-hardened aluminum pistons, full-pressure lubrication and automatic choke with fast idle mode. In 1946, dual windshield wipers were standard.

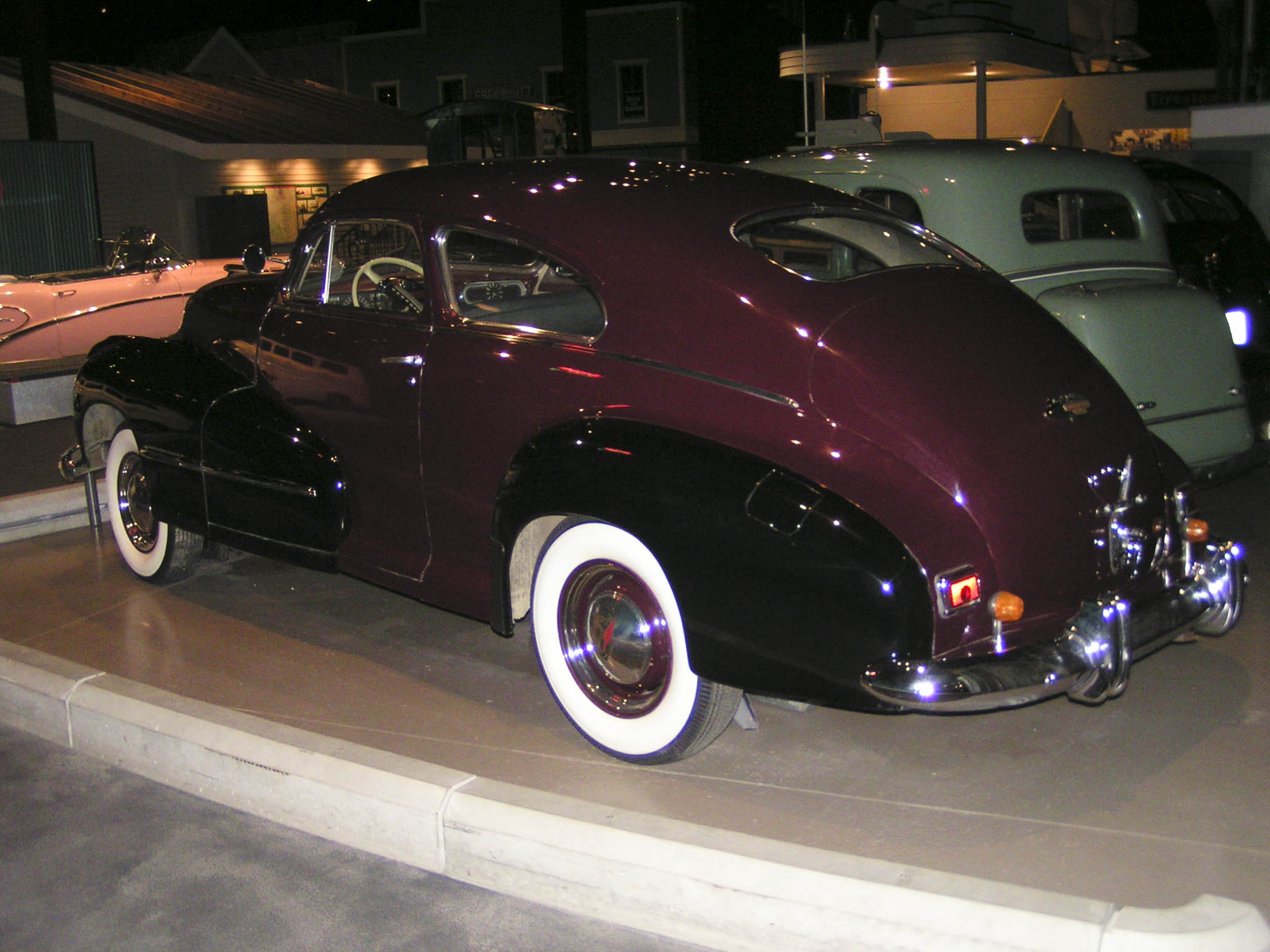
1947 Oldsmobile 66 Club Coupe

In 1947 more models were offered on the low-priced Special 60 series than the other two Oldsmobile series. The eight-cylinder engine returned to the Special 60 series and there were again 66 and 68 versions of each body style offered. Standard equipment included: safety glass, spare wheel and tire, dual horns, vacuum booster pump and cigarette lighter. The standard interior fabric was tan mixture cloth. Standard tire size was 6.00 x 16 inches. Horsepower grew to 100 for the six and 110 for the eight. It also had a 37 ft (11 m) turning circle.

The 66 and 68 were renamed the Dynamic 66 and 68 in 1948, sharing the designation with the Series 70. The Dynamic 60 series were the smallest Oldsmobiles available and offered the greatest variety or body styles. Both six-cylinder and eight-cylinder engines were available and were designated 66 and 68. Standard 60 Series equipment included: dual horns, dual sun visors and a cigarette lighter. The deluxe equipment package added foam rubber seat cushions, deluxe steering wheel, deluxe instrument cluster, clock and chrome wheel trim rings. Standard tires were 6.00 x 16 inches. Upholstery was Bedford cord or broadcloth.

The Series 60 model designation was retired after 1948, the L-head six-cylinder was then increased in displacement to 257 cu in (4.2 L) and was used only in the Oldsmobile 76 which was discontinued in 1950. A limited number were put through production in 1950, but only five exist today.

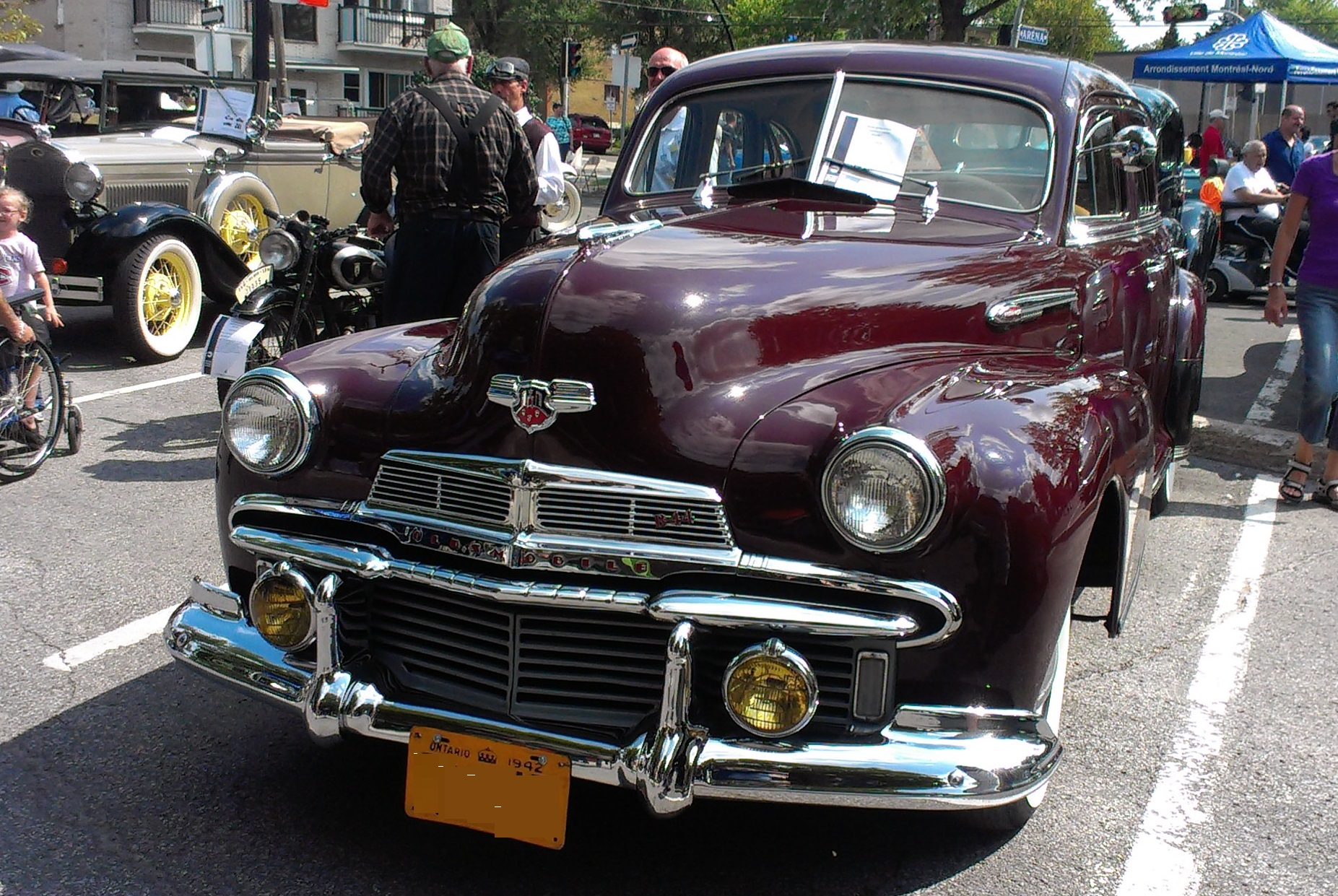
1942 Oldsmobile Special 66 or 68 4-door sedan

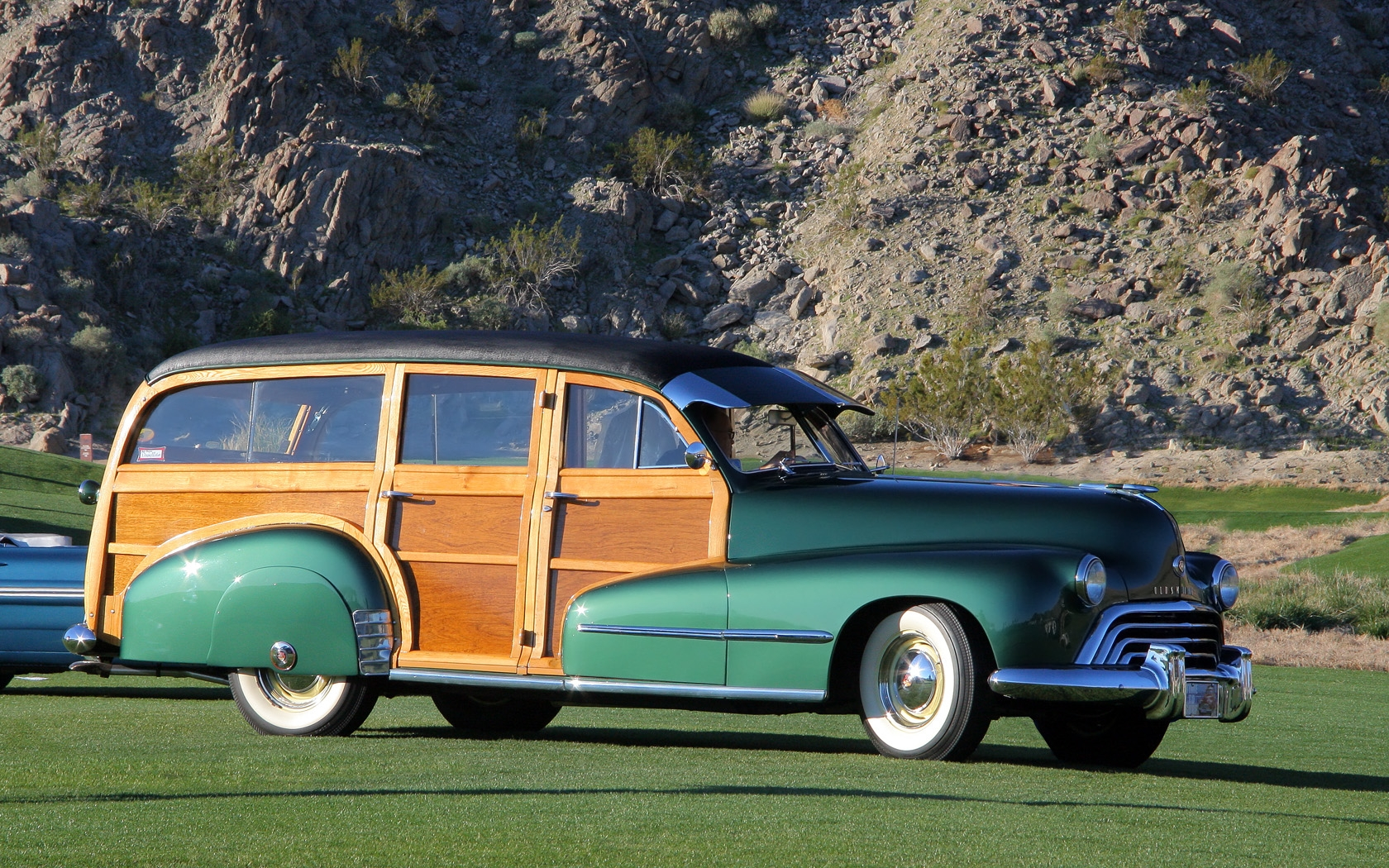
1948 Oldsmobile 66 station wagon

== Australian production ==
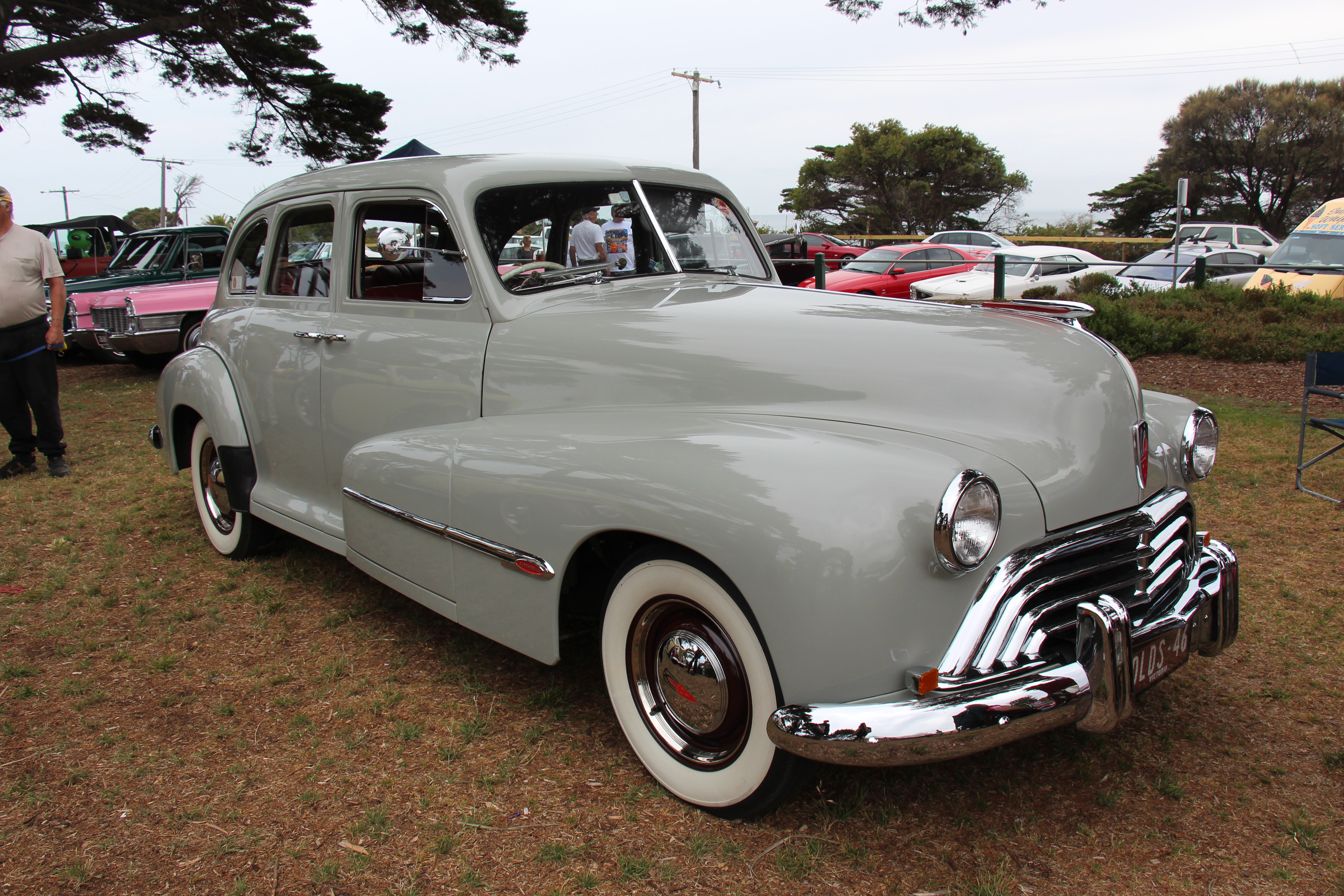
1946 Oldsmobile Ace

The Series 60 was also produced from 1946 to 1948 by General Motors-Holden's in Australia, where it was marketed as the Oldsmobile Ace. Local bodies were fitted and these cars are completely different from the scuttle back and were the last GM cars to feature "suicide doors" (hinged at the back).

== South African production ==
Cars were exported to South Africa in complete knock down (CKD) form for local assembly.
