= Oldsmobile F-Series =

Pre-WWII passenger car

Oldsmobile Six F-Series
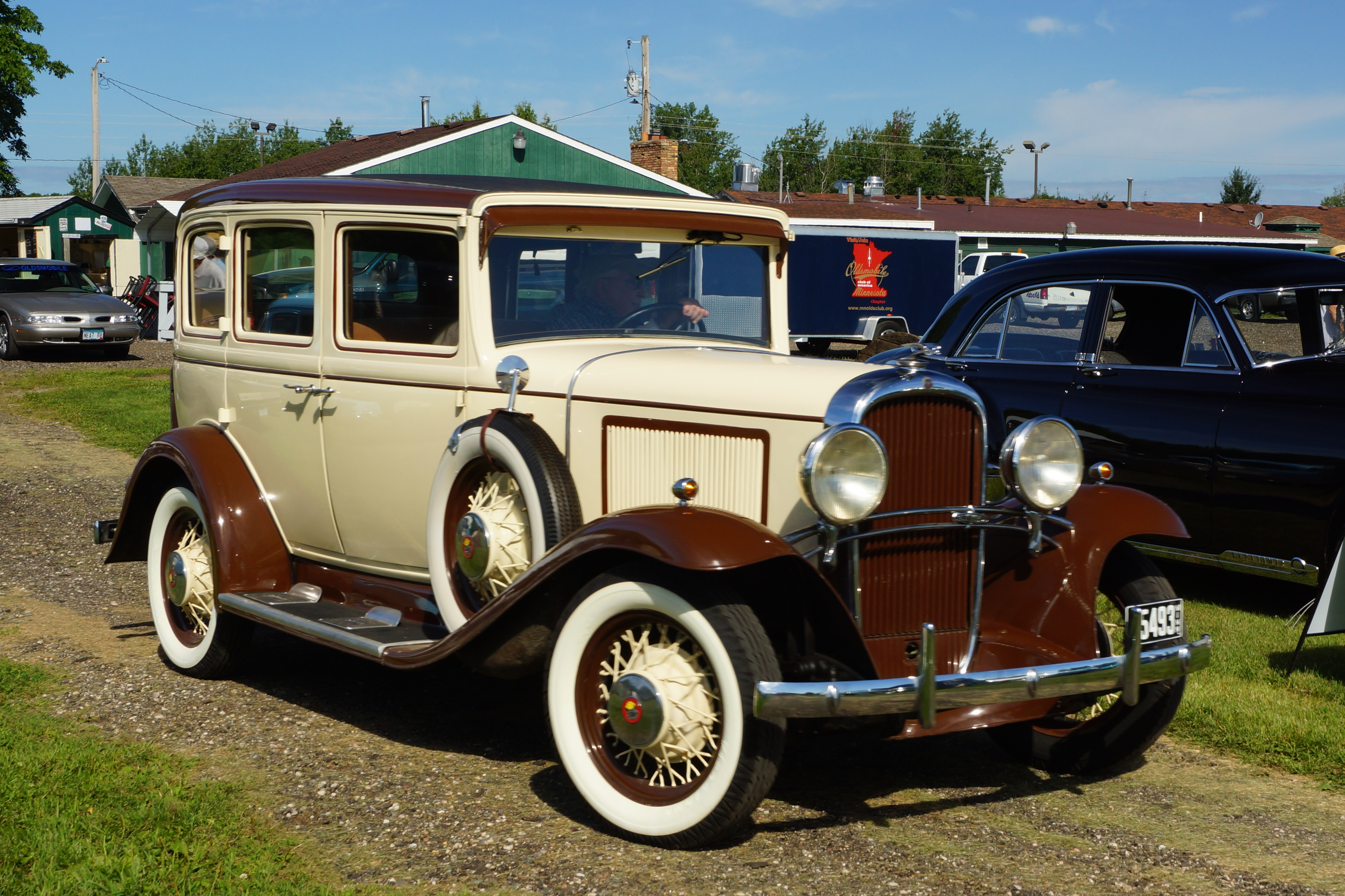
- 1931 Oldsmobile F-31 4-door sedan model# 31-FS

Overview
- Manufacturer: General Motors
- Production: Fisher Body; Detroit, Michigan
- Model years: 1928–1938
- Assembly: (main plant); United States: Lansing, Michigan (Lansing Car Assembly) (branch assembly); Linden Assembly; Linden, New Jersey (starting 1937); South Gate Assembly; South Gate, California (starting 1937)

Body and chassis
- Body style: Roadster; Two-door coupe; Four-door sedan
- Layout: FR layout
- Platform: GM B platform

Powertrain
- Engine: Oldsmobile straight-6 engine
- Transmission: Automatic Safety Transmission (1937-1939); 3-speed manual transmission

Chronology
- Predecessor: Olds Six Model 30-E
- Successor: Olds Series 60; Olds Series 70

The Oldsmobile F-Series was a pre-WWII passenger car built from the 1928 through 1938 model years. The first generation continued the tradition of adding a series number for each model year; F-28, F-29, F-30 and F-31. The second generation, signified by a completely new bodystyle appearance was built from 1932 through 1938, all having been manufactured in Lansing, Michigan. 1926 saw the introduction of GM's most recognized business model, the use of common platforms shared amongst the brands, and Oldsmobile and Buick shared the GM B platform. The F-Series was shared with the Buick Master Six and was also known as the Oldsmobile Six which was introduced as a name earlier in 1913.

The F-Series was Oldsmobile's entry-level product using the Oldsmobile straight-6 engine, and was GM's mid-priced volume leader, offered in several body styles on a common wheelbase, while the Oldsmobile L-Series, with an Oldsmobile Straight-8 engine, was the top level vehicle with a longer wheelbase. It replaced the Oldsmobile Model 30 introduced in 1923, and was replaced by the Oldsmobile Series 60 and Oldsmobile Series 70 introduced in 1938. It was exported to Japan as a knock down kit and assembled at Osaka Assembly in Osaka, Japan.

== First generation (F-28, F-29, F-30, F-31, F-32) ==
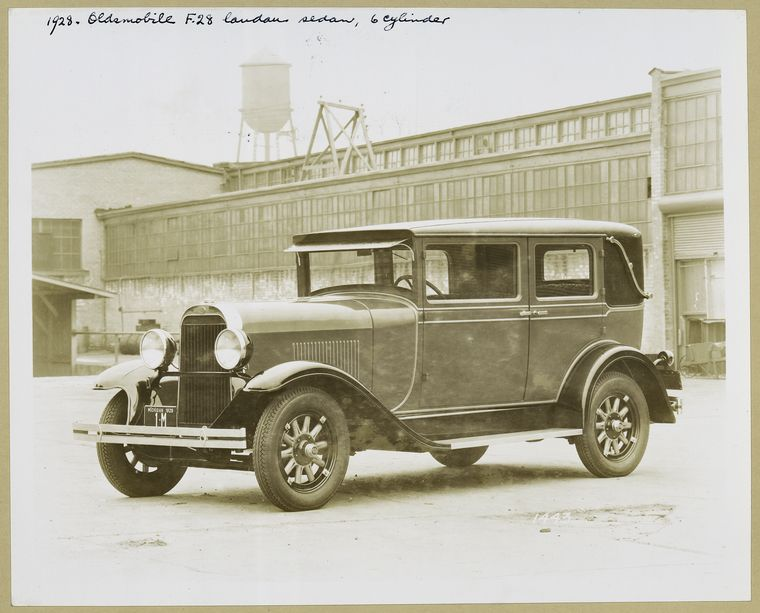
1928 Oldsmobile F-28 Landau Sedan

The F-Series was equipped with a side-valve, in-line 197 cu in (3,228 cc) six-cylinder engine developing 55 bhp. The Model 30 had a wheelbase of 113–114 in (2,858–2,883 mm) and was offered as a touring car, roadster, closed body sedan, coupe and landaulet. All four wheels now offered as standard equipment drum brakes on all four wheels. It offered a technical advancement that the three-speed manual transmission was now synchronized, and all bodystyles were now wider than previous generations, with an overall length of 173 in (4,394 mm). For the 1929 model year, the landaulet was replaced with the "Patrician" appearance package on the sedan. For 1931 the touring car bodystyle was cancelled permanently.

Oldsmobile had been positioned as dependable, minimal adornment, while reliable, using tested technology used in engines, suspension and driver controls in previous models. When the F-Series was introduced, twelve different body styles were offered in an array of colors using automotive lacquer by Duco (a DuPont brand product). The choices were roadsters with optional rumble seats, touring sedans, closed body coupes, sedans, with a "Deluxe" term for higher content models on closed body coupes and sedans, while the top level choice was the Deluxe Landau Sedan. Prices for 1928 started at US$925 ($17,344 in 2025 dollars) for a choice of 2-door 3-passenger coupe or 2-door 4-passenger sedan to US$1,235 ($22,890 in 2025 dollars) for the 4-door 5-passenger Deluxe Landau sedan. Roadsters and touring sedans had the ability to fold the windshield forward on top of the cowl for open air driving.

Starting in 1929, Oldsmobile received a senior level companion brand called Viking. Sales were compared as to which brand customers preferred as Oldsmobile was being reviewed for cancellation. Customers preferred Oldsmobile over Viking and the brand was cancelled in 1931. Chrysler took notice of the popularity of Oldsmobile products and introduced DeSoto that offered similar levels of luxury.

=== See also ===
- 1931 Cadillac Series 355
- 1928 LaSalle Series 303
- 1928 Buick Master Six
- 1928 Oakland Six Model 212 All American
- 1928 Pontiac Six Series 6-28
- 1928 Chevrolet Series AB National

== Second generation (F-33, F-34, F-35, F-36, F-37, F-38) ==
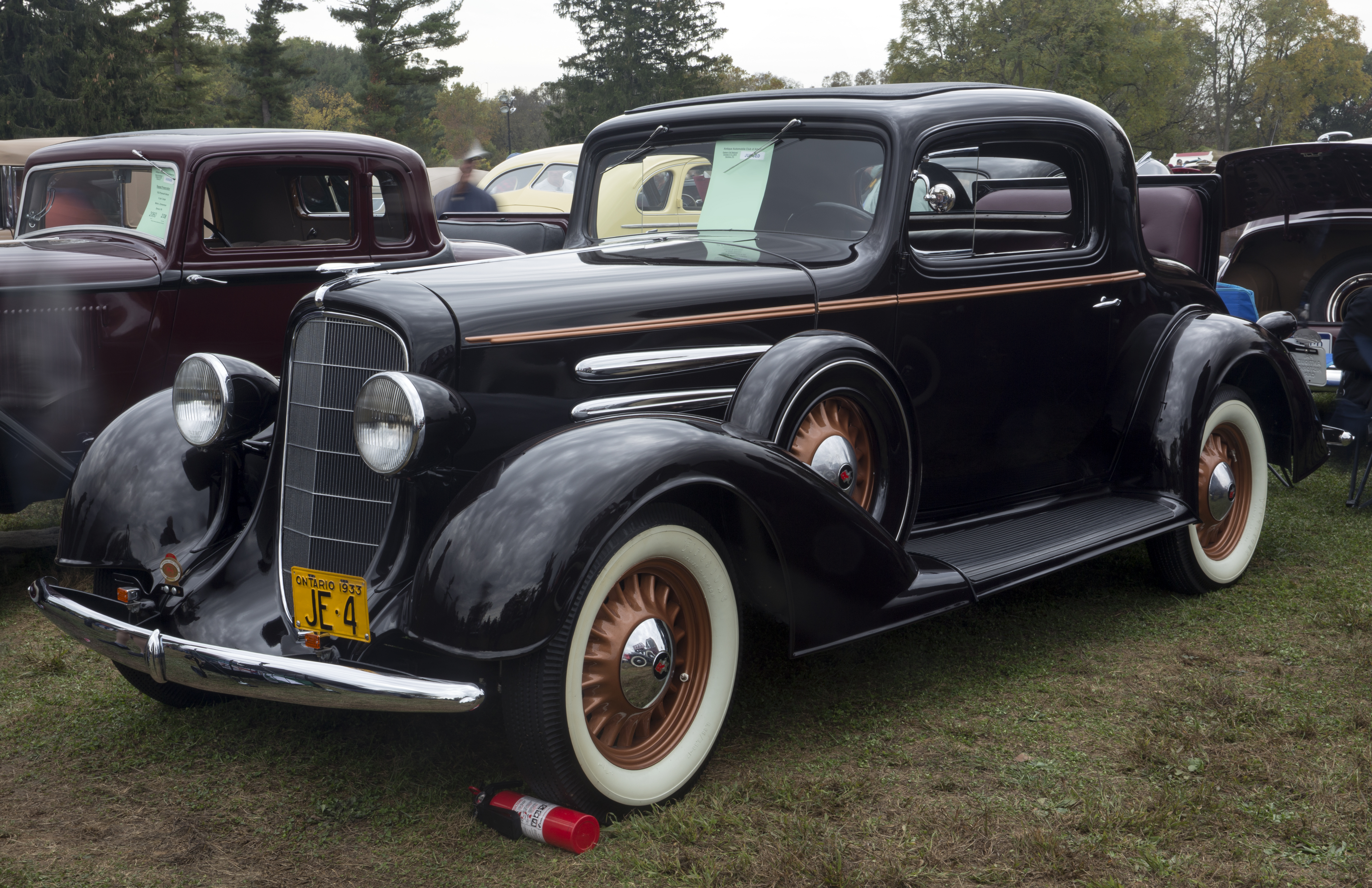
1933 Oldsmobile F-Series Sport Coupe

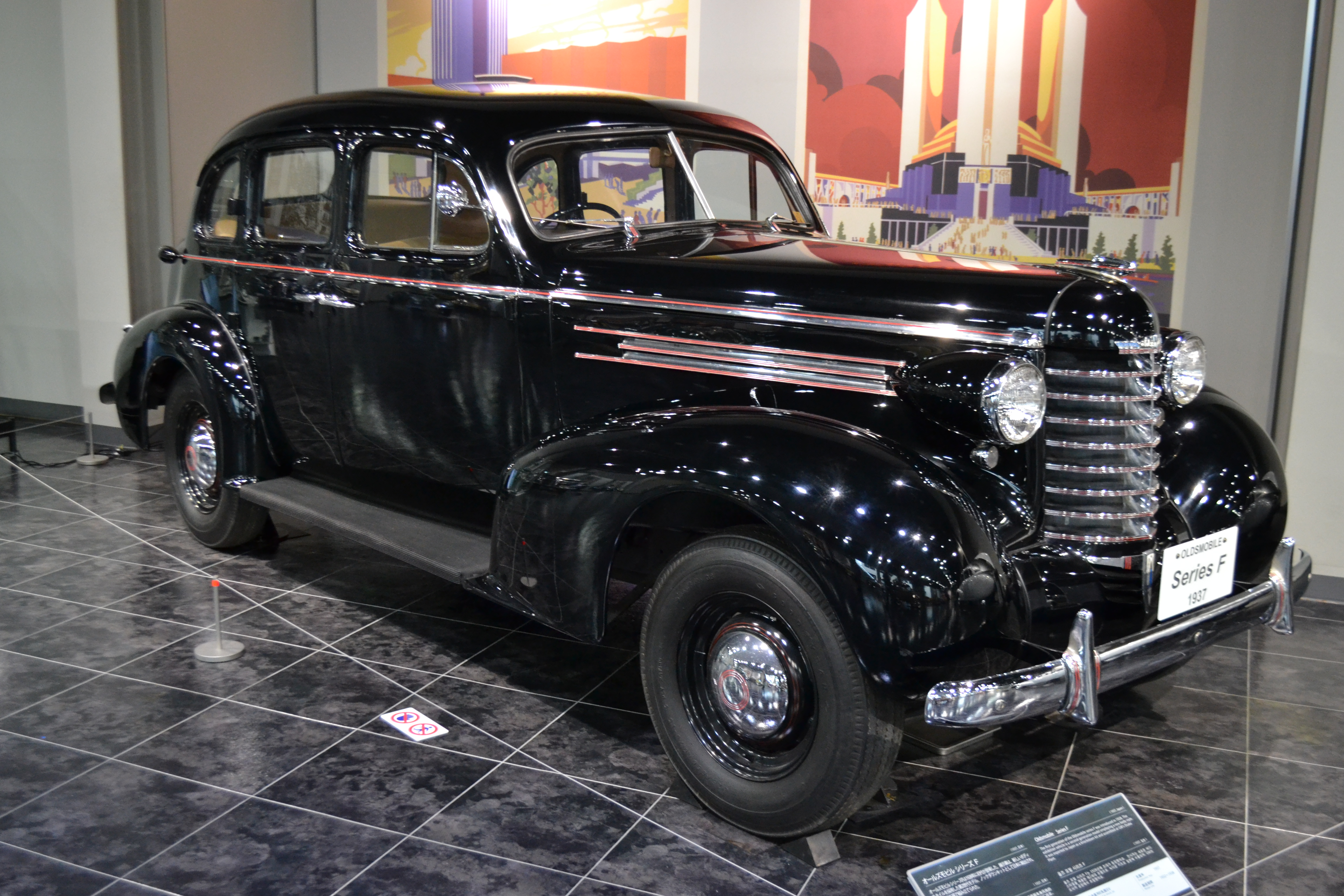
1937 Oldsmobile F-Series Touring Sedan

The 1933 F-Series was introduced with an all new appearance and were equipped with a side-valve, in-line 213 cu in (3,490 cc) Oldsmobile six-cylinder engine developing 74 bhp. This generation had a wheelbase of 117 in (2,960 mm) and was offered as an open top roadster, closed body sedan, coupe and convertible. All four wheels now offered as standard equipment hydraulic drum brakes on all four wheels, and wooden spoked wheels were permanently discontinued with pressed steel discs instead. The 1933 four-door Touring Sedan was listed at $855 ($21,265 in 2025 dollars) and manufactured 5,720.

With the modern appearance of streamlined gaining widely accepted public approval, all bodystyles across GM's vehicles adopted the appearance, as a result of the Art and Color Studio under the leadership of Harley Earl, with an overall length of 179–190 in (4,540–4,837 mm), and in 1936 69,443 Touring Sedans were manufactured which combined to an overall production of 158,291 F-Series. In 1937 when the South Gate, California and Linden, New Jersey facilities were opened, 137,613 F-Series were manufactured which was affected by the Recession of 1937–1938. The Ford Motor Company began to take notice of the popularity of Oldsmobiles and introduced the De Luxe Ford as an upscale alternative which preceded the introduction of Mercury in 1938.

The options for 1937 included a single mounted spare tire in the front fender, bumper guards, a choice of AM radio with a single or twin speakers, a choice of passenger compartment heaters, a choice of clocks that were manually wound or electric, cigar lighter, seat covers, spotlight, dual windshield defroster or an electrically operated defroster with fan, wheel trim rings, wheel discs, deluxe steering wheel, luggage compartment mat, luggage compartment light, fender markers, fog lamps, insect side window screens, winter grille cover and a winter radiator shutter controlled from the instrument panel.

For model year 1938, the F-series was split into two designations; the Series F (60) and Series G (70) and both used a six-cylinder engine. The Series G consisted of the longer wheelbase from the L-series while using the 230 cu in (3,769 cc) six-cylinder engine from the F-series and was renamed the Series 70 in 1940. The 1938 F-Series four-door Touring Sedan was listed at $995 ($22,758 in 2025 dollars) and manufactured 36,484.

=== See also ===
- 1936 Cadillac Series 60
- 1936 LaSalle Series 36-50
- 1935 Buick Special
- 1935 Buick Century
- 1935 Pontiac Six
- 1935 Chevrolet Master
