= Oldsmobile Series 70 =

Car model

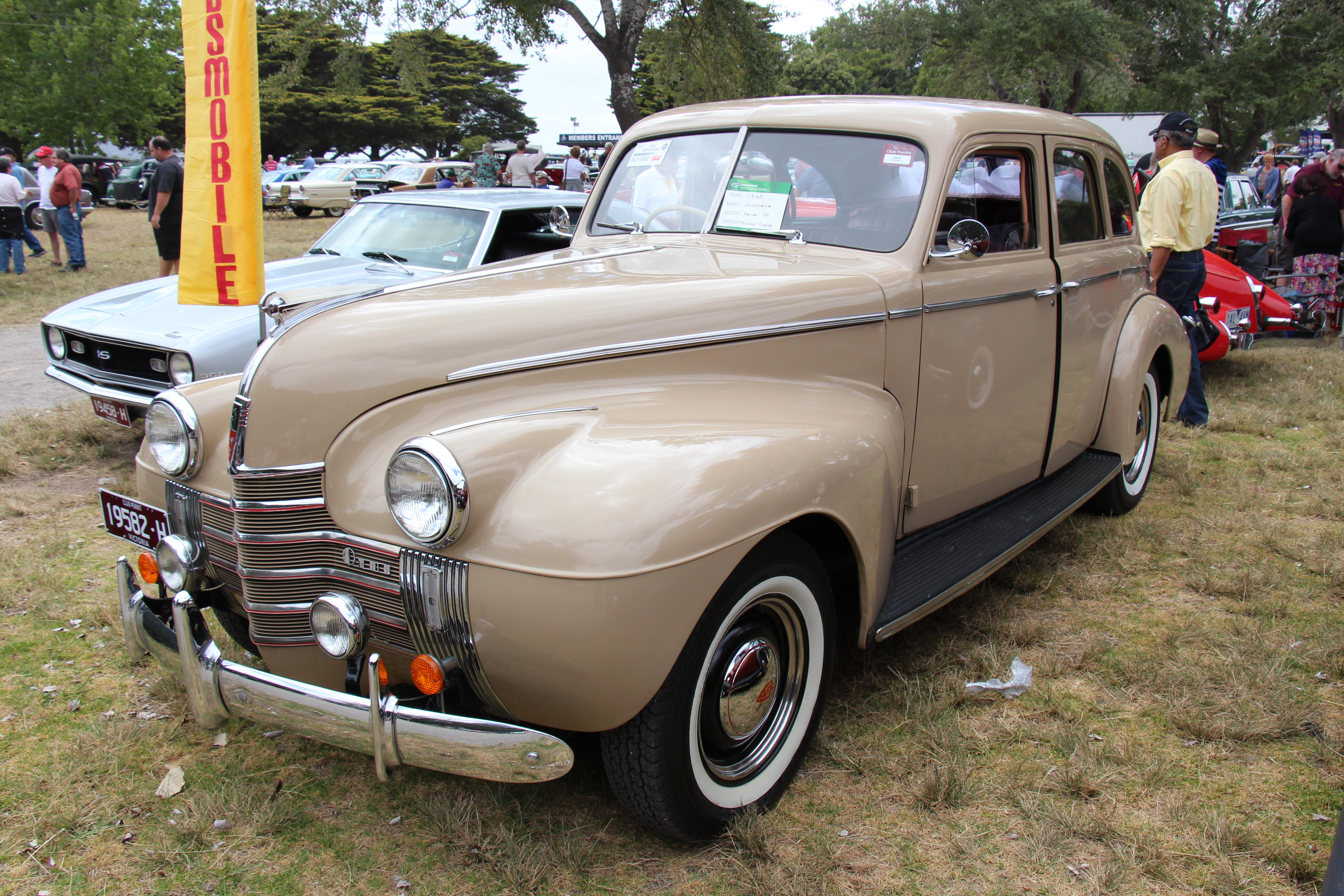
- Oldsmobile Series 70 "Dynamic" sedan

Overview
- Manufacturer: Oldsmobile (General Motors)
- Production: 1938–1950

Body and chassis
- Class: Full-size
- Layout: FR layout

Chronology
- Predecessor: Oldsmobile G-Series 70
- Successor: Oldsmobile Cutlass

The Oldsmobile Series 70 is a full-size midrange automobile produced by Oldsmobile between the 1939 and 1950 model years. Oldsmobiles of this time period were in an upwardly-shaded "middle" position in GM's hierarchy of automobile brands. Chevrolet and Pontiac were the budget priced models, while Buick and Cadillac were the high-end brands. GM would share their "A" body platforms between Chevrolet and Pontiac, and midrange "B" body on Oldsmobile and Buick, while leaving mainstream Cadillacs and senior Oldsmobiles and Buicks (such as the Oldsmobile 98 and Buick Roadmaster and Limited), and even the Pontiac Streamliner, on its top production luxury "C" platform. Leaving its largest and most prestigious D platform to senior Cadillacs and the 1936–1942 Buick Limited.

Competitors from Ford's Mercury and Chrysler's DeSoto brands would give customers a choice to have Oldsmobile levels of luxury, while not paying as much as a comparable Olds. GM would discontinue the budget Oldsmobile Series 60 in 1949 and the Series 70 in 1950, while introducing the Oldsmobile 88 in 1949 to push Oldsmobile upmarket and leaving the lower priced market position to Chevrolet and Pontiac.

It was with the 1940s on that GM vehicles experienced increased width to accommodate three passengers each on front and rear bench seats, accomplished by deleting running boards and moving the floor mounted gearshift to the steering column, including the Hydramatic automatic transmission.

== 1939–1940 ==
First generation
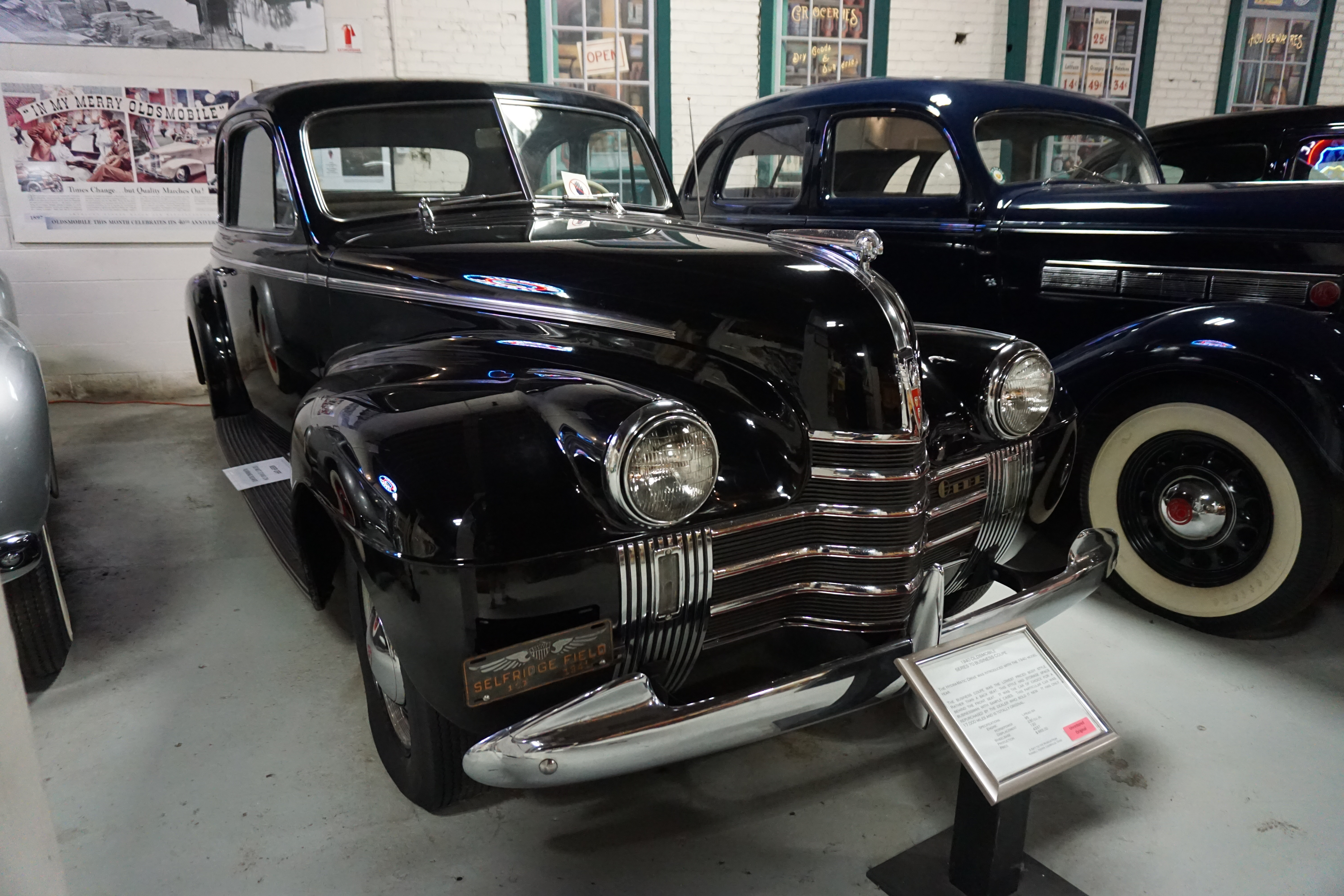
- 1940 Oldsmobile 76 Business Coupe

Overview
- Model years: 1939–1940
- Assembly: (main plant); United States: Lansing, Michigan (Lansing Car Assembly) (branch assembly); South Gate, California; Linden, New Jersey; Osaka, Japan
- Designer: Harley Earl

Body and chassis
- Body style: 2-door Business coupe 2-door Club coupe 4-door sedan 2-door convertible
- Platform: B-body
- Related: Cadillac Series 61; LaSalle Series 50; Buick Century; Buick Special

Powertrain
- Engine: 215 cu in (3.5 L) Oldsmobile Straight-six engine 230 cu in (3.8 L) Oldsmobile Straight-six engine
- Transmission: 3-speed synchromesh manual 4-speed Hydra-Matic automatic

Dimensions
- Wheelbase: 120.0 in (3,048 mm)
- Length: 1939: 197.0 in (5,004 mm); 1940: 199.8 in (5,075 mm)
- Height: 1939: 65.8 in (1,671 mm); 1940: 65.0 in (1,651 mm)
- Curb weight: 3,200–3,500 lb (1,500–1,600 kg)

Naming standards were in flux at Oldsmobile during the late 1930s and 1940s. From 1932 through 1938, Oldsmobile had two series: "F" and "L". Series F came with a straight-6 engine and Series L came with a larger body and a straight-8 engine. Series F was renamed Series 60 in 1939 and Series L was replaced with the Series 70, with the two Series being powered by the straight-6 and the straight-8 respectively. The Series 60 used the GM A-body and the Series 70 used the B-body.

In 1940, the even larger C-body was introduced to Oldsmobile and it alone was powered by the straight-8. In order to differentiate it as Oldsmobiles senior level vehicle it was named the Series 90 while remaining below the Buick Special. The series were also given names for the first time that year with the Series 60, 70, and 90 being called the Special, Dynamic, and Custom Cruiser respectively. The Hydramatic transmission, a fully clutchless automatic, debuted in October 1939 for 1940 Oldsmobiles.

== 1941–1948 ==
Second generation
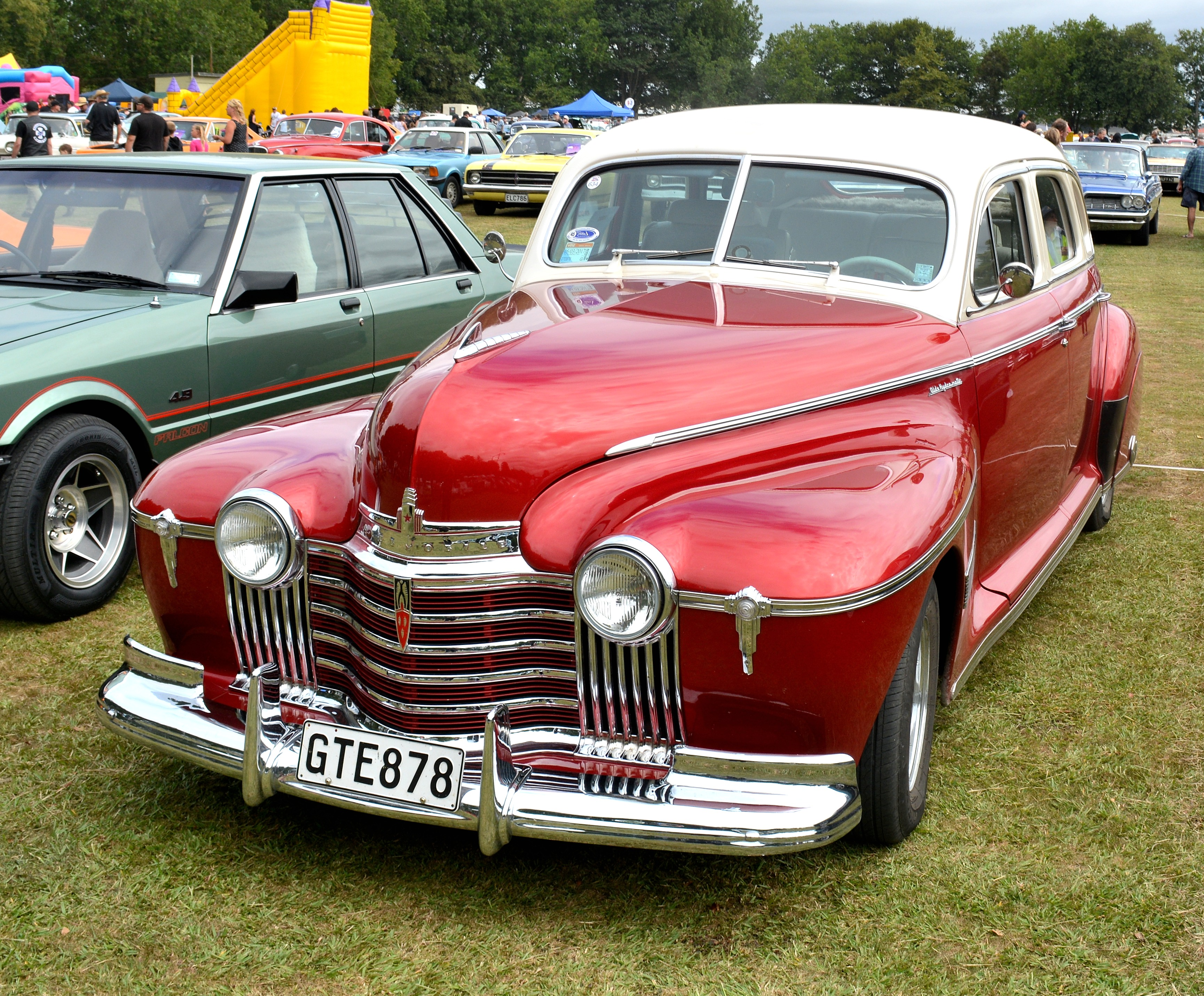
- 1941 Oldsmobile Dynamic Cruiser sedan

Overview
- Model years: 1941–1942, 1946-1948
- Assembly: (main plant); United States: Lansing, Michigan (Lansing Car Assembly) (branch assembly); South Gate, California; Linden, New Jersey new locations in 1946; Kansas City, Kansas new locations in 1947; Wilmington, Delaware; Doraville, Georgia "Atlanta" new locations in 1948; Framingham, Massachusetts
- Designer: Harley Earl

Body and chassis
- Body style: 2-door Business coupe 2-door Club coupe 4-door sedan
- Platform: B-body
- Related: Cadillac Series 61; Buick Century; Buick Special; Pontiac Streamliner Torpedo; Pontiac Streamliner

Powertrain
- Engine: 238 cu in (3.9 L) Oldsmobile Straight-six engine 257 cu in (4.2 L) Oldsmobile Straight-eight engine
- Transmission: 3-speed synchromesh manual 4-speed Hydra-Matic automatic

Dimensions
- Wheelbase: 125.0 in (3,175 mm)
- Length: 1941: 211.0 in (5,359 mm); 1942: 212.0 in (5,385 mm); 1946: 214.0 in (5,436 mm); 1947–48: 213.0 in (5,410 mm)
- Width: 76 in (1,930 mm)
- Height: 65.2 in (1,656 mm)
- Curb weight: 3,500–3,700 lb (1,600–1,700 kg)

In 1941 both straight six- and straight eight-engines were offered on each series, so to differentiate between the two the second digit was used to denote the number of cylinders, so the Dynamic 70 was replaced with the Dynamic 76 and 78, and the Custom Cruiser 90 was replaced with the Custom Cruiser 96 and 98. In 1942 sales literature started referring to the Series 70 as the Dynamic Cruiser 76 and 78, and Oldsmobile dropped the six cylinder Series 90 model, leaving only the Custom Cruiser 98.

Production was delayed from 1942 until 1945 due to World War II. To celebrate the company's 44th anniversary, all limited production 1942 autos received a small "B-44" badge on their grille.

In 1946 the Dynamic Cruiser Series 70 was Oldsmobile's mid-priced model, and offered both a 2-door Club Sedan and 4-door Sedan.

Electrical equipment was modest as the cars of this time only used a 6-volt system. The standard equipment offered Bedford cord or broadcloth upholstery, front seat retractable center armrests, rubber floor mats, painted woodgrained instrument panel, dual sun visors, dual electric windshield wipers, and an automatic choke for the carburetor for easier starts for a cold engine. The DeLuxe trim package came with carpeted inserts in the rubber floor mats, a deluxe instrument with full gauges, a retractable center armrest for the rear seat, the E-Z-I anti-glare rear view mirror and an electric clock. the Standard Series 70 had 16" wheels while the DeLuxe had 15" wheels as standard equipment.

Some optional equipment included a choice of a 6-tube or DeLuxe 7-tube radio, electric clock, plastic steering wheel, rear window wiper for both sedans, and auxiliary driving lights.

List price for the Dynamic 70 4-door Sedan was US$1,568 ($25,888 in 2025 dollars). with 25,528 units sold. The Dynamic 70 DeLuxe 4-door Sedan sold for US$1,678 ($27,704 in 2025 dollars), with 5,118 sold.

1947 was Oldsmobile's fiftieth anniversary and other than some new two-tone exterior paint options, the standard and optional equipment and features were carried over from previous years. A heater and windshield defroster was added to the options list for US$32 ($461 in 2025 dollars). New branch assembly locations were added at Atlanta and Wilmington.

The Dynamic Cruiser series proved Oldsmobile’s most popular, with 38,152 2-door Club Sedans and 30,841 4-door Sedans were built, more than the Special 60 Series or the larger Custom Cruiser 98. The Dynamic 76 was produced in Australia with fewer than 120 thought to have been produced during 1947.

In 1948, when the Series 60 was renamed the Dynamic the "Cruiser" tag was dropped from the Series 70 and it was once again named the Dynamic 76 and 78.

== 1949–1950 ==
Third generation
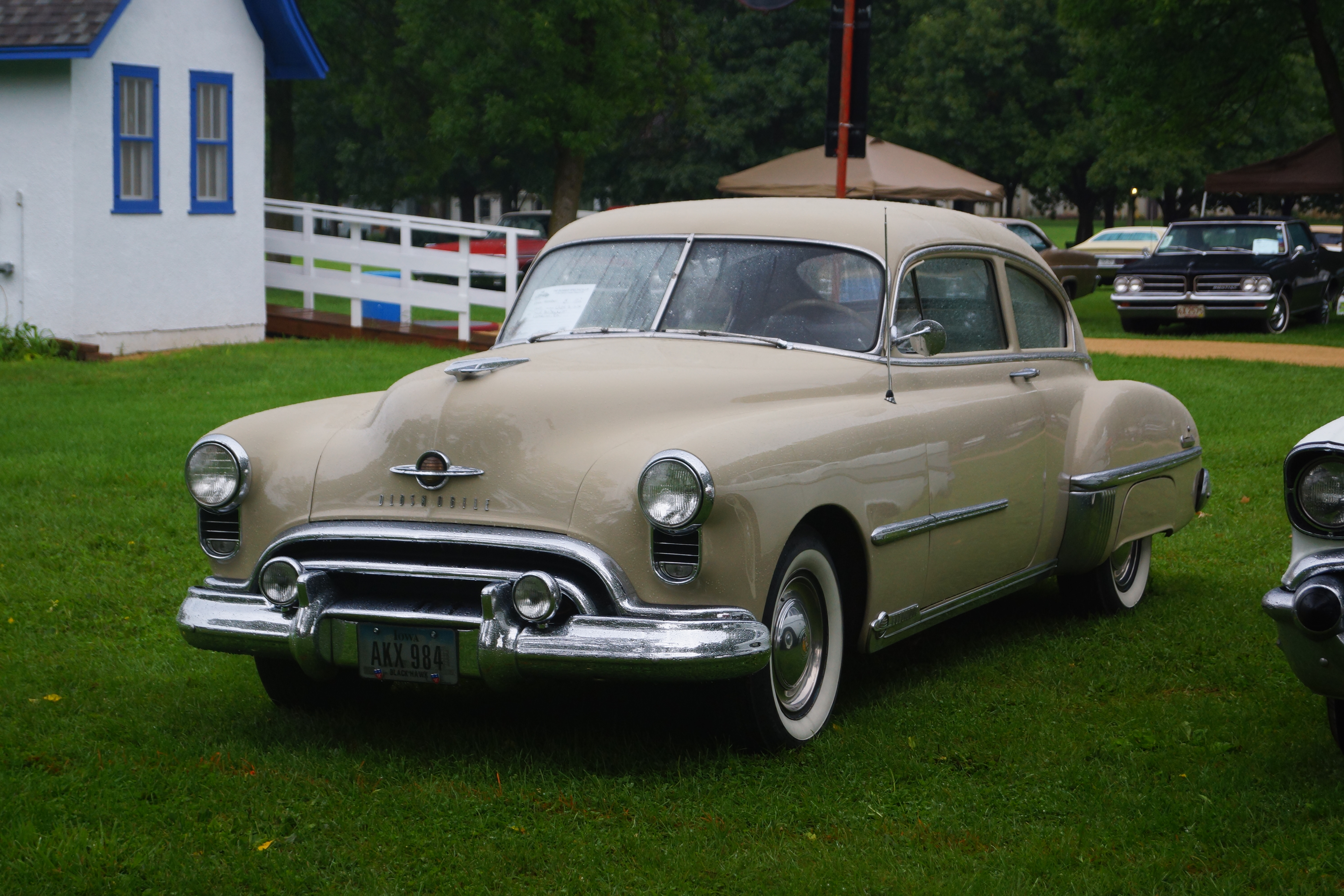
- 1949 Oldsmobile Seventy-Six Club Sedan with 88 rocker ornament and 98 door moulding

Overview
- Model years: 1949–1950
- Assembly: (main plant); Lansing, Michigan (branch assembly); South Gate, California; Wilmington, Delaware; Doraville, Georgia "Atlanta"; Kansas City, Kansas; Framingham, Massachusetts; Linden, New Jersey
- Designer: Harley Earl

Body and chassis
- Body style: 2-door Club coupe 2-door Holiday hardtop 4-door sedan 2-door convertible 4-door station wagon
- Platform: A-body
- Related: Buick Special; Oldsmobile 88; Pontiac Streamliner

Powertrain
- Engine: 257 cu in (4.2 L) Oldsmobile I6
- Transmission: 3-speed synchromesh manual 4-speed Hydramatic automatic

Dimensions
- Wheelbase: 119.5 in (3,035 mm)
- Length: 202.0 in (5,131 mm)
- Width: 75.2 in (1,910 mm)
- Curb weight: 3,500–3,800 lb (1,600–1,700 kg)

The all new postwar Futuramic styling that had debuted on the C-body Oldsmobile 98 in 1948 was brought to Oldsmobile's 1949 A-body, which it also shared with Pontiac and Chevrolet. The new name Seventy-Six, with the numbers now spelled out, became Oldsmobile's entry-level model with the discontinuation of the Series 60. Its wheelbase grew to 119.5 inches (3,040 mm), and the car was only available with the Oldsmobile straight-6 engine.

The straight-8 78 model was retired with the 1949 introduction of the new Oldsmobile overhead-valve Rocket V8 powered 88, which absorbed the 78’s “Futuramic” A-body platform shared with the Seventy-Six.

In its final year, the 1950 Seventy-Six continued to offer the DeLuxe trim package (also available on the station wagon), while the Holiday hardtop coupe (produced by welding a steel roof onto the Seventy-Six convertible)was briefly offered. Only 144 standard coupes and 394 with the DeLuxe trim package were sold, at a list price of US$2,108 ($28,209 in 2025 dollars). This model is particularly rare today, as it was the only time Oldsmobile offered an upscale hardtop body style with a six-cylinder engine.

The Seventy-Six was available in the following body styles:

- Station wagon
- Convertible
- Holiday hardtop coupé (2-door)
- Club coupé (2-door)
- Club sedan (2-door fastback)
- Town Sedan (4-door fastback)1949 Only
- 2 door Sedan (2-door)1950 only
- 4 door Sedan (4-door)
