= Oldsmobile straight-6 engine =

Automobile engine

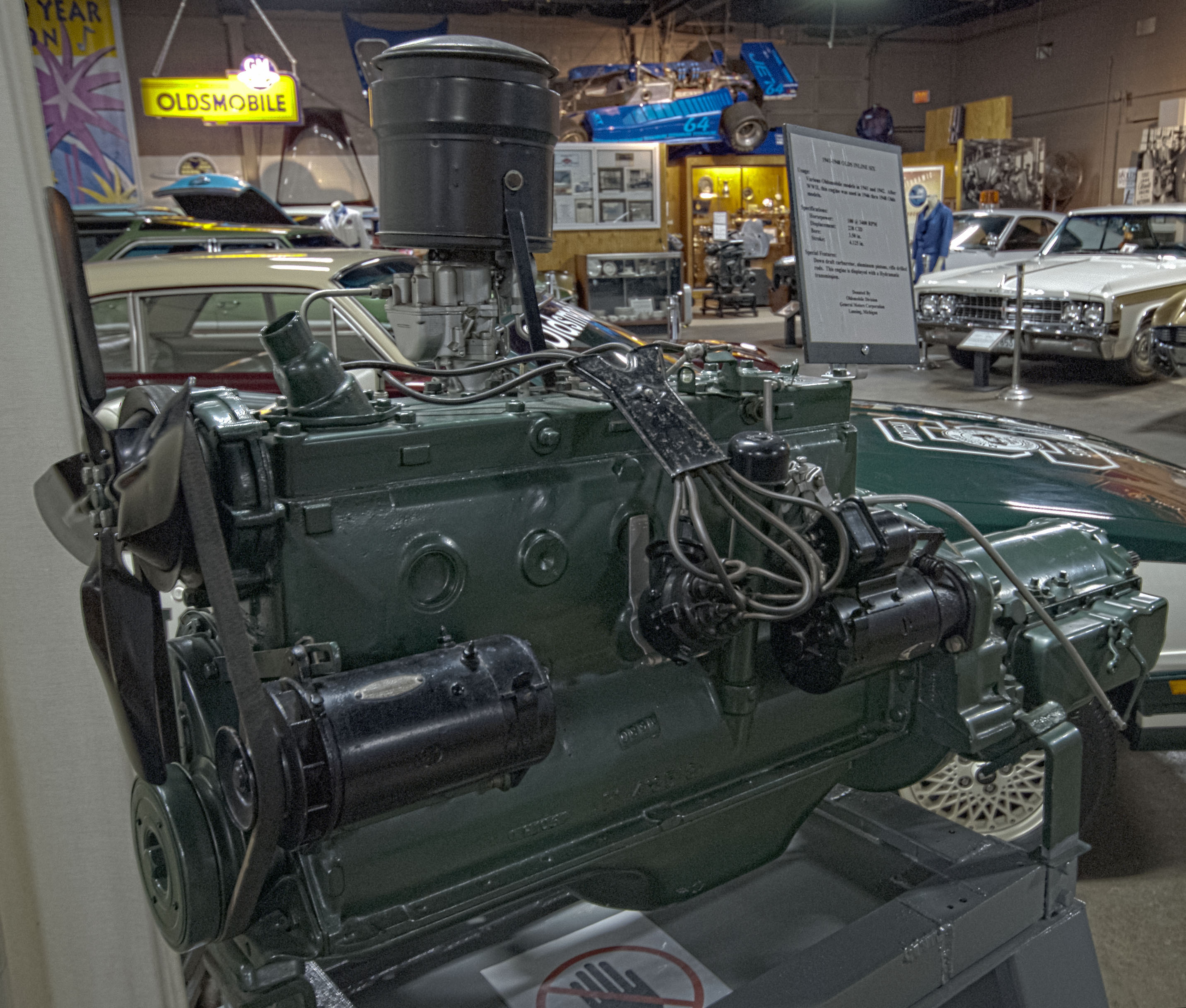
1941 Olds Inline Six 238

Oldsmobile produced a straight-6 automobile engine from 1923 to 1950. It was a conventional side-valve engine of varying capacities and at stages was shared with GMC.

Although the engines changed from year to year there were basically 5 series of Oldsmobile side-valve 6 cylinder engines over the 27 years of production, 1923 to 1927, 1928 to 1931, 1932 to 1936, 1937 to 1948 and 1949 to 1950. The '49 to '50 Big Six was to be the last inline six built by Oldsmobile although there were a few models in the late '60s and early '70s built using the overhead valve Chevrolet Turbo-Thrift engine.

== 505 ==
The 505 cu in (8.28 L) was used by the Oldsmobile Series 23 between 1910 and 1912. It used a T-head engine configuration and made 60 bhp. In 1911 the displacement increased to 706.0 cubic inches (11,569 cc) while remaining at 60 bhp.

== 380 ==
The 380 cu in (6.2 L) was used by the Oldsmobile Model 53 between 1913 and 1915, and made 50 bhp.

== 177 ==
The 177 cu in (2.90 L) was used by the Oldsmobile Model 37 between 1917 and 1921 and made 40 bhp.

== 169 ==
The 169.3 cu in (2.774 L) was used by the Oldsmobile Model 30 between 1923 and 1926. It used a 2 3/4" bore and 4 3/4" stroke and made 40 bhp at 2600 RPM.

== 185 ==
The 185 cu in (3.03 L) was used by the Oldsmobile F-Series for the 1927 model year only and it was basically an over-bored 169. It used a 2 7/8" bore and 4 3/4" stroke and made 44 bhp at 2600 RPM.

== 198 ==
The 197.5 cu in (3.236 L) was used by the Oldsmobile F-Series between 1928 and 1931 in various power outputs. It used a 3 3/16" bore and 4 1/8" stroke, had a compression ratio of 5.2:1 and when released in 1928 made 55 bhp at 2700 RPM.

In 1929 the intake was upgraded from 1" to a 1 1/4" carburetor and power increased to 61 bhp at 3000 RPM. 1931 saw another increase in power to 65 bhp at 3350 RPM.

== 213 ==
The 213.3 cu in (3.495 L) was used by the Oldsmobile F-Series between 1932 and 1936 and also by GMC in their 1936 T-14 and T-16 trucks. It used a 3 5/16" bore and 4 1/8" stroke and on its introduction in 1932 had a compression ratio of 5.3:1 and made 74 bhp at 3200 RPM.

For 1933 the capacity was increased to 221 but reverted to the original displacement the following year, with a higher compression ratio of 5.7:1 made 84 bhp at 3200 RPM.

== 221 ==
The 221.4 cu in (3.628 L) was used by the Oldsmobile F-Series for one year in 1933 and then reverted to using the 213. It had a 3 3/8" bore and 4 1/8" stroke.

This 1933 engine was the first Olds to use removable "shell" bearings in lieu of the earlier poured in place babbit bearings.

== 230 ==
The 229.7 cu in (3.764 L) was used by the Oldsmobile F-Series, Oldsmobile Series 60 and Oldsmobile Series 70 between 1937 & 1940 and also GMC in their 1937 & 1938 T-16, F-16, T-16H and F-16H trucks. It used a 3 7/16" bore and 4 1/8" stroke.

== 216 ==
The 216 cu in (3.54 L) was used by Oldsmobile for only one year in 1939 for the 60 series vehicle. It was basically a de-stroked 230 and used the same 3 7/16" bore but a 3 7/8" stroke.

== 238 ==
The 238 cu in (3.90 L) 238 was used by the Oldsmobile Series 60 and Oldsmobile Series 70 between 1941 and 1948. It used a 3 1/2" bore and 4 1/8" stroke

== 257 ==
The 257 cu in (4.21 L) 257 was used only by the Oldsmobile 76 during the 1949-50 model years. It used a 3 17/32" and 4 3/8" stroke. These engines were known as the "Big Six" and had this description cast into the cylinder head.

== See also ==
- Oldsmobile Straight-8 engine
- Oldsmobile V8 engine
- List of GM engines
