= General Motors B platform =

GM B Platform
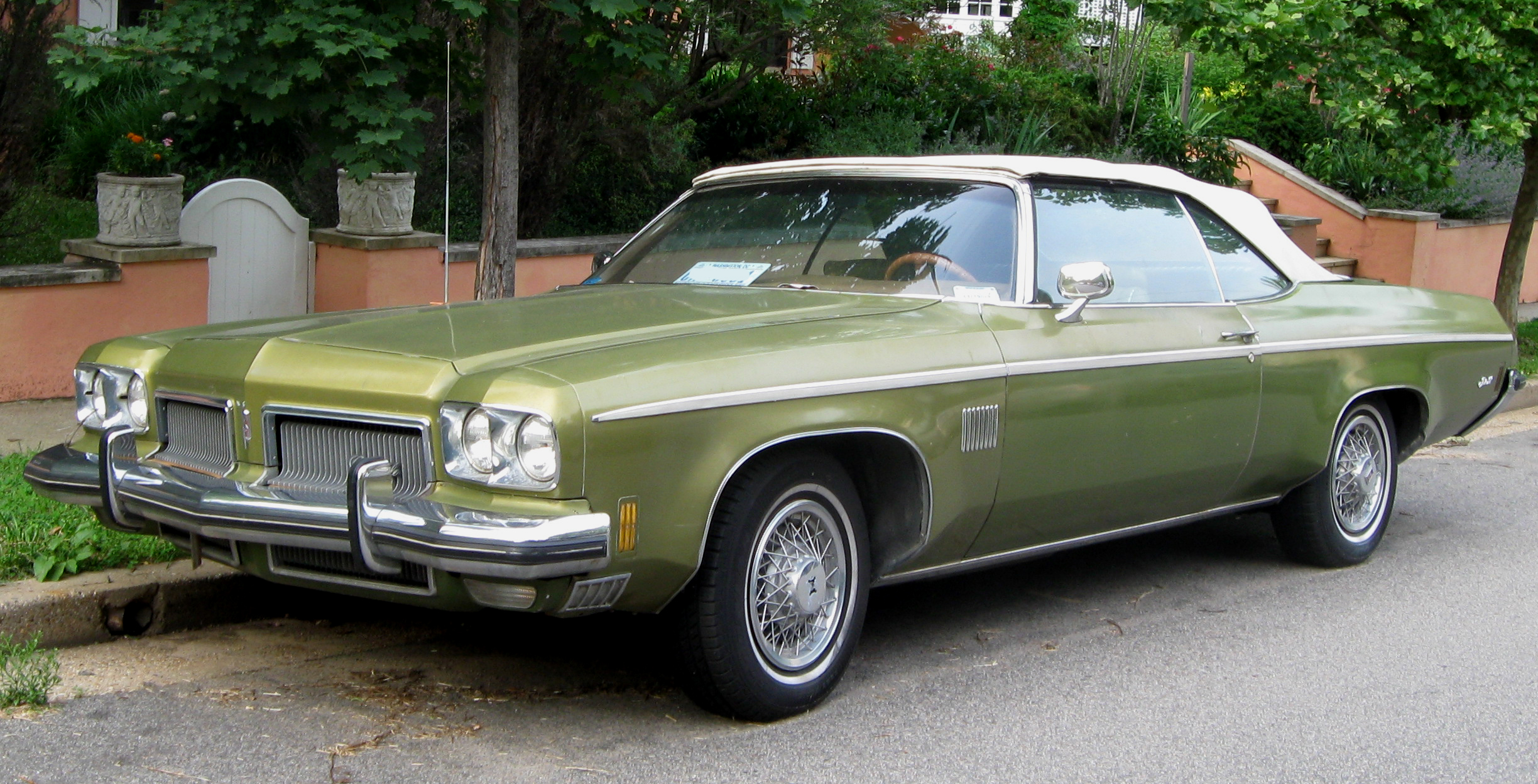
- 1973 Oldsmobile Delta 88 convertible

Overview
- Manufacturer: General Motors; Buick; Pontiac; Chevrolet; Oldsmobile; Cadillac
- Production: 1926–1996

Body and chassis
- Class: Full-size car
- Layout: FR layout

Chronology
- Successor: GM H platform (FWD) (full-size); GM G platform (1995) (full-size); GM W platform (full-size); GM V platform (RWD) (for Chevrolet Caprice sold in the Middle East); GM Zeta Platform (for Chevrolet Caprice sold in both the Middle East & North America and Chevrolet SS for the RWD Impala SS)

The B platform (also known as the B body) is a full-size, rear-wheel drive, body-on-frame car platform, that was produced by General Motors (GM) from 1926 to 1996. Originally made for Oldsmobile and Buick, all of General Motors's five main passenger car makes would use it at some point. It was closely related to the original rear-wheel drive C and D platforms, and was used for convertibles, hardtops, coupes, sedans, and station wagons. With approximately 12,960,000 units built, divided across four marques, the 1965–1970 B platform is the fourth best selling automobile platform in history after the Volkswagen Beetle, Ford Model T, and the Fiat 124 (and its licence-built copies, mainly classic Ladas).

Originally, the B platform was used for Buick and Oldsmobile products, with the A platform for Chevrolet and Oakland, and the C and D platforms devoted to Cadillac. During the General Motors companion make program, Vikings and Marquettes were also manufactured on this platform, as were La Salles from 1936 to 1940. The B platform became GM's base model platform in 1958, when all existing Chevrolet products were upgraded to the B platform.

The B platform was used for the Pontiac Streamliner Torpedo and Streamliner; the Oldsmobile L-Series, Series 70, and Series 88; the Buick Special and Century; the LaSalle Series 50; and the Cadillac Series 60, Series 61, and Series 63.

For the 1959 model year, the previous A- and B-bodies were built on the new B platform that lasted until 1996. During this period, the B was the most modest of GM's three full-sized platforms, slotting below the upscale C and the luxury D. The A platform designation would be resurrected by GM in 1964 for a new series of intermediate-sized cars including the Chevrolet Chevelle, Pontiac Tempest, Oldsmobile Cutlass, and Buick Skylark.

== History ==
The GM B platform was introduced in 1926 with the Buick Master Six, and the Oldsmobile Model 30, and had at least 12 major re-engineering and restyling efforts, for the 1937, 1939, 1941, 1949, 1954, 1957, 1959, 1961, 1965, 1971, 1977, and 1991 model years; along with interim styling changes for 1942, 1969, and 1980 that included new sheetmetal and revised rooflines. The platform was downsized in length by approximately 10 inches in 1977 and reduced in weight by an average of 800 pounds.

In 1991, the platform received its last major redesign, regaining several inches in length and featuring numerous frame improvements and reinforcements, while the shorter wheelbase remained unchanged. The last B-cars rolled off the line in 1996, leaving only Ford producing domestic large rear-wheel-drive sedans until the line was phased out in late 2011, with Chrysler reentering the market with their LX platform in 2005.

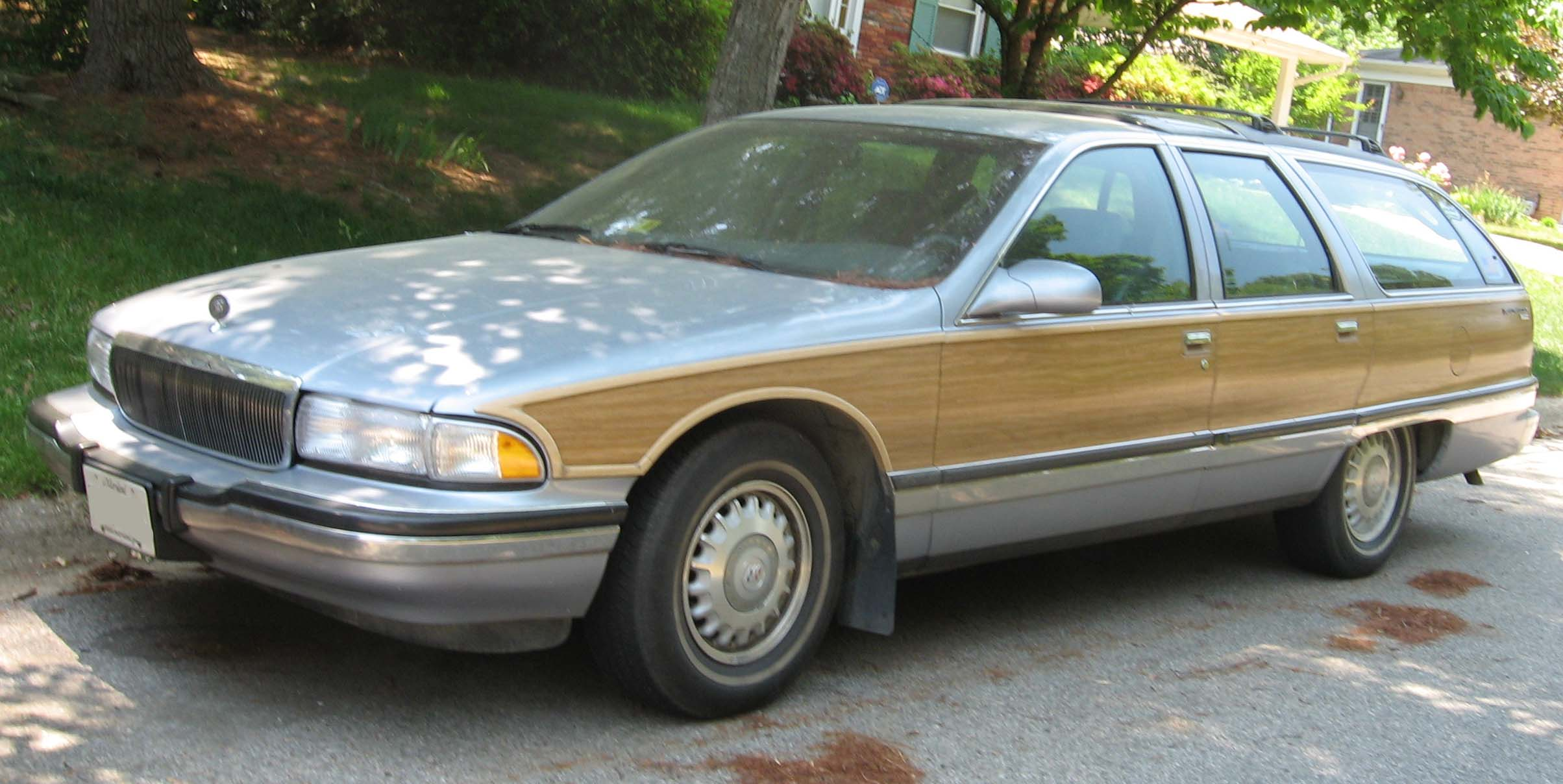
1996 Buick Roadmaster Estate Wagon

Known for being durable and reliable, most B-platform cars used suspensions utilizing coil springs in the front and leaf springs in the rear until 1958, when they switched to coils in the rear; one exception is the 1959–60 Oldsmobile 88, which used coil springs in front and multi-leaf springs in the rear. All B-platform cars since 1965 used perimeter frames with side rails, along with the 1961–64 B-platform Pontiacs and Oldsmobiles. The 1958–60 Buicks and 1959–60 Oldsmobiles used a ladder-type frame, while an X-frame without side rails was used on 1959–60 Pontiacs, 1959–64 Chevrolets, and 1961–64 Buicks.

The B platform was the last platform design to have the gasoline tank filler port behind the license plate after 1958. Exceptions included all station wagons, as well as all 1961–64 cars (which had the tank filler in the rear fender on the driver's side) and 1965 Buicks (which had their fuel filler door above the license plate). Also, the B-platform vehicles from Pontiac, Oldsmobile, and Buick from 1941 to 1948 had the fuel filler door in the rear fender on the driver's side.

By 1986, the Buick LeSabre and Oldsmobile Delta 88 moved to the GM H platform. And in 1991, Chairman Robert Stempel said:

There are some corporate things we're going to drive; we are a front-drive corporation.

He also stated that the rear-wheel-drive 1992 Buick Roadmaster and Chevrolet Caprice had been produced "over my dead body." No direct successor for this platform was made after 1996, when the Roadmaster and Caprice ceased production. However, the Caprice would be revived and built on the Opel-developed V platform for the Middle East but built by Holden, while years later, the Caprice for police use along with the Impala SS successor, the Chevrolet SS, would return to the United States, built on the GM Zeta platform developed by Holden in Australia.

== Use ==
=== Sedans ===
Chevrolet

- 1959–1972 Chevrolet Biscayne
- 1973–1975 Chevrolet Biscayne (sold only in Canada)
- 1958–1975 Chevrolet Bel Air
- 1976–1981 Chevrolet Bel Air (sold only in Canada, as a rebadged Impala)
- 1958–1985 Chevrolet Impala
- 1994–1996 Chevrolet Impala SS
- 1966–1996 Chevrolet Caprice
- 1996 Chevrolet Caprice SS (sold only in the Middle East, as a rebadged Impala SS)

Pontiac

- 1937–1940 Pontiac Deluxe Eight
- 1941 Pontiac Streamliner Torpedo
- 1942–1951 Pontiac Streamliner
- 1959–1981 Pontiac Bonneville
- 1959–1981 Pontiac Catalina
- 1959–1981 Pontiac Parisienne (Canada only)
- 1983–1986 Pontiac Parisienne
- 1959–1966 Pontiac Star Chief
- 1959–1970 Pontiac Strato Chief (Canada only)
- 1960–1961 Pontiac Ventura
- 1962–1981 Pontiac Laurentian (Canada only)
- 1966–1969 Pontiac Grande Parisienne (Canada only)
- 1967–1970 Pontiac Executive
- 1971–1975 Pontiac Grand Ville

Oldsmobile

- 1926–1935 Oldsmobile F-Series
- 1929–1931 Viking
- 1936–1939 Oldsmobile L-Series
- 1939 Oldsmobile G-Series
- 1940 Oldsmobile Series 70
- 1941 Oldsmobile Dynamic 76
- 1941 Oldsmobile Dynamic 78
- 1942–1947 Oldsmobile Dynamic Cruiser 76
- 1942–1947 Oldsmobile Dynamic Cruiser 78
- 1948 Oldsmobile Dynamic 76
- 1948 Oldsmobile Dynamic 78
- 1949 Oldsmobile Futuramic 76
- 1949 Oldsmobile Futuramic 88
- 1950 Oldsmobile 76
- 1950–1956 Oldsmobile 88
- 1951–1964 Oldsmobile Super 88
- 1957 Oldsmobile Golden Rocket 88
- 1958–1966 Oldsmobile Dynamic 88
- 1964–1966 Oldsmobile Jetstar 88
- 1965–1985 Oldsmobile Delta 88
- 1967–1968 Oldsmobile Delmont 88

Buick

- 1926–1935 Buick Master Six
- 1926–1935 Buick Standard Six
- 1930 Marquette
- 1936–1942 Buick Century
- 1954–1958 Buick Century
- 1936–1958 Buick Special
- 1959–1962 Buick Invicta
- 1959–1985 Buick LeSabre
- 1963–1970 Buick Wildcat
- 1971–1973 Buick Centurion
- 1991–1996 Buick Roadmaster

Cadillac

- 1936–1938 Cadillac Series 60
- 1936–1940 LaSalle Series 50
- 1939 Cadillac Series 61
- 1941–1947 Cadillac Series 61
- 1950–1951 Cadillac Series 61
- 1941–1942 Cadillac Series 63

Stutz

- 1979-1981 Stutz IV-Porte
- 1981-1985 Stutz Victoria

=== Two-door only ===
- 1961–1969 Chevrolet Impala SS
- 1961–1966 Oldsmobile Starfire
- 1964–1965 Oldsmobile Jetstar I
- 1962–1968 Pontiac Grand Prix
- 1966 Pontiac 2+2
- 1977–1978 Buick Riviera
- 1959–1960 Chevrolet El Camino coupe utility

=== Station wagons ===
- 1941–1942 Buick Special Estate
- 1954–1958 Buick Century Estate
- 1954–1958 Buick Special Estate
- 1959–1963 Buick Invicta Estate
- 1959–1964 Buick LeSabre Estate
- 1970 Buick Estate
- 1971–1976 Buick Estate (trim between LeSabre and Electra)
- 1977–1979 Buick Estate (with LeSabre trim)
- 1977–1979 Buick Estate Limited (with Electra trim)
- 1980–1989 Buick Electra Estate
- 1980–1989 Buick LeSabre Estate
- 1990 Buick Estate
- 1991–1996 Buick Roadmaster Estate
- 1966–1968 Chevrolet Caprice Estate
- 1969–1970 Chevrolet Kingswood Estate
- 1971–1972 Chevrolet Kingswood Estate (Caprice trim)
- 1973–1976 Chevrolet Caprice Estate
- 1977–1996 Chevrolet Caprice Estate
- 1959–1961 Chevrolet Nomad (Impala trim)
- 1962–1968 Chevrolet Impala
- 1969–1970 Chevrolet Kingswood
- 1971–1972 Chevrolet Kingswood (Impala trim)
- 1973–1976 Chevrolet Impala
- 1977–1985 Chevrolet Impala
- 1959–1960 Chevrolet Kingswood (Bel Air trim)
- 1959–1961 Chevrolet Parkwood (Bel Air trim)
- 1962–1968 Chevrolet Bel Air
- 1969–1970 Chevrolet Townsman
- 1971–1972 Chevrolet Townsman (Bel Air trim)
- 1973–1975 Chevrolet Bel Air
- 1977–1979 Chevrolet Bel Air (sold only in Canada, as a rebadged Impala)
- 1959–1961 Chevrolet Brookwood (Biscayne trim)
- 1962–1968 Chevrolet Biscayne
- 1969–1970 Chevrolet Brookwood
- 1971–1972 Chevrolet Brookwood (Biscayne trim)
- 1949–1950 Oldsmobile 88 station wagon
- 1949–1950 Oldsmobile 76 station wagon
- 1957 Oldsmobile 88 Golden Rocket Fiesta
- 1957–1963 Oldsmobile Super 88 Fiesta
- 1958–1964 Oldsmobile Dynamic 88 Fiesta
- 1971–1976 Oldsmobile Custom Cruiser (trim between 88 and 98)
- 1977–1992 Oldsmobile Custom Cruiser
- 1942–1951 Pontiac Streamliner station wagon
- 1959–1970 Pontiac Bonneville Safari
- 1971–1976 Pontiac Grand Safari (Grand Ville trim)
- 1977–1978 Pontiac Grand Safari
- 1977–1981 Pontiac Bonneville Safari
- 1959–1970 Pontiac Parisienne Safari (Canada only)
- 1977–1981 Pontiac Parisienne Safari (Canada only)
- 1967–1969 Pontiac Grande Parisienne Safari (Canada only)
- 1983–1986 Pontiac Parisienne Safari
- 1959–1970 Pontiac Catalina Safari
- 1971–1976 Pontiac Safari (Catalina trim)
- 1977–1981 Pontiac Catalina Safari
- 1959–1970 Pontiac Laurentian Safari (Canada only)
- 1977–1981 Pontiac Laurentian Safari (Canada only)
- 1987–1989 Pontiac Safari

== See also ==
- List of General Motors platforms
