= Lansing Car Assembly =

American automobile factory

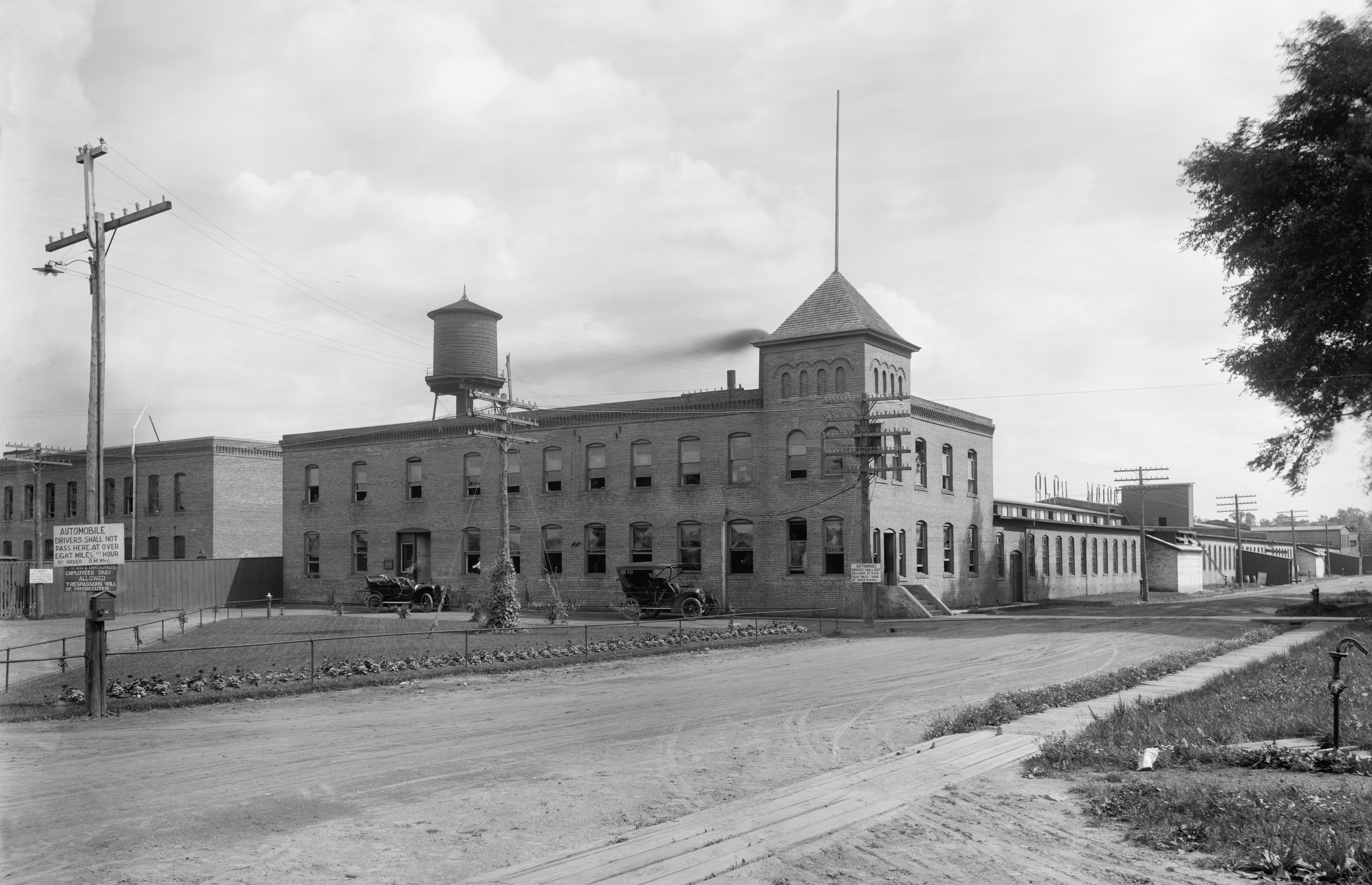
- Olds Motor Works c. 1905–1920
- Operated: 1901–2006
- Location: Lansing, Michigan
- Coordinates: 42.72°N 84.58°W
- Industry: Automotive
- Products: Automobiles
- Owner: Olds Motor Works (1901–1908); General Motors (1908–2006)
- Defunct: May 2006; 20 years ago

Lansing Car Assembly was a General Motors automobile factory in Lansing, Michigan. It contained two elements, a 1901 automobile plant in downtown Lansing, and the 1920 Durant Motors factory on Lansing's Far Westside.

The Lansing plant was the home factory for Oldsmobile, and the longest-operating automobile factory in the United States when it closed on May 6, 2005, and one of General Motors last assembly plants where vehicle bodies were made at one plant, and then trucked to another plant to be finished. General Motors began demolition of the plant in the spring of 2006, and demolition was completed in 2007. A new plant at nearby Lansing Grand River Assembly, which began production in 2001, as well as the Delta Township called Lansing Delta Township Assembly assumed some operations when it began production in 2006.

From the 1940s through the 1980s, it was the main producer of full-size Oldsmobiles (88 and 98), but by the 1990s it was producing compact cars for several GM divisions.

== History ==
Lansing Car Assembly (LCA) began in 1901 when Ransom E. Olds moved his Olds Motor Works company to the city. He set up his plant on the site of the fairgrounds next to the Grand River. This plant in downtown Lansing would later be known as Lansing Car Assembly – Chassis Plant. Engine block and cylinder heads were cast at Saginaw Metal Casting Operations.

=== Body shop (plant #6) ===
The plant along Verlinden Avenue, on Lansing's border with Lansing Township, opened in 1920 as a factory for Durant Motor Works. After the demise of Durant in 1931, the plant remained closed until GM purchased it in 1935. It restarted production for GM's Fisher Body division, later becoming the Buick–Oldsmobile–Cadillac factory. Its final name was Lansing Car Assembly – Body Plant.

The last cars that Lansing Car Assembly produced were the Chevrolet Malibu/Chevrolet Classic, Oldsmobile Alero, and Pontiac Grand Am, which was the final vehicle built there. The plant built the very last Oldsmobile, a 2004 Alero.

LCA was regularly ranked among the most productive automobile assembly plants in North America. In 2002, it was ranked the number one most productive assembly plant in North America by The Harbour Report, the auto industry's leading measurement of plant efficiency.

=== Main plant (plant #1) ===
The main plant was located in downtown Lansing, Michigan, located along Martin Luther King, Jr. Boulevard at the Grand River. It sat on the original site of the Michigan State Fairgrounds. The plant also included the unique "Lansing GM Building 150" which sat in between Martin Luther King, Jr. Boulevard bridges.

It featured two separate assembly lines. Partially completed vehicles were transported by truck from the Body Plant to either the North Line "M" or the South Line "C" for completion. Upon completion, cars were driven off the assembly line and under northbound Martin Luther King, Jr.Boulevard bridge. After final inspection, the cars were placed in staging yards to either be shipped by truck or by rail.

The first factory on site opened in 1902 as part of Olds Motor Works, and became part of General Motors when they bought that company out in 1908. The complex was closed in 2005, finally being demolished in 2007. Harbour Consulting rated it as the sixth most efficient auto plant in North America in 2006.

== Vehicles produced ==
- Oldsmobile Curved Dash (1901–1907)
- Oldsmobile Six (1913–1921)
- Oldsmobile Model 30 (1923–1927)
- Oldsmobile F-Series (1928–1938)
- Oldsmobile L-Series (1928–1938)
- Viking companion brand (1929–1931)
- Oldsmobile Series 60 (1938–1948)
- Oldsmobile Series 70 (1938–1950)
- Oldsmobile Series 80 (1949–1984)
- Oldsmobile Series 90 (1940–1984)
- Oldsmobile Cutlass/Oldsmobile Cutlass Supreme (1961–1984)
- Buick Somerset (1985–1987)
- Oldsmobile Calais/Cutlass Calais (1985–1991)
- Pontiac Grand Am (1985–2005)
- Buick Skylark (1986–1998)
- Oldsmobile Achieva (1992–1998)
- Chevrolet Cavalier coupe (1995–1998)
- Oldsmobile Alero (1999–2004)
- Chevrolet Malibu/Classic (2001–2005)
