= Oldsmobile Model 30 =

Car model

Oldsmobile Six
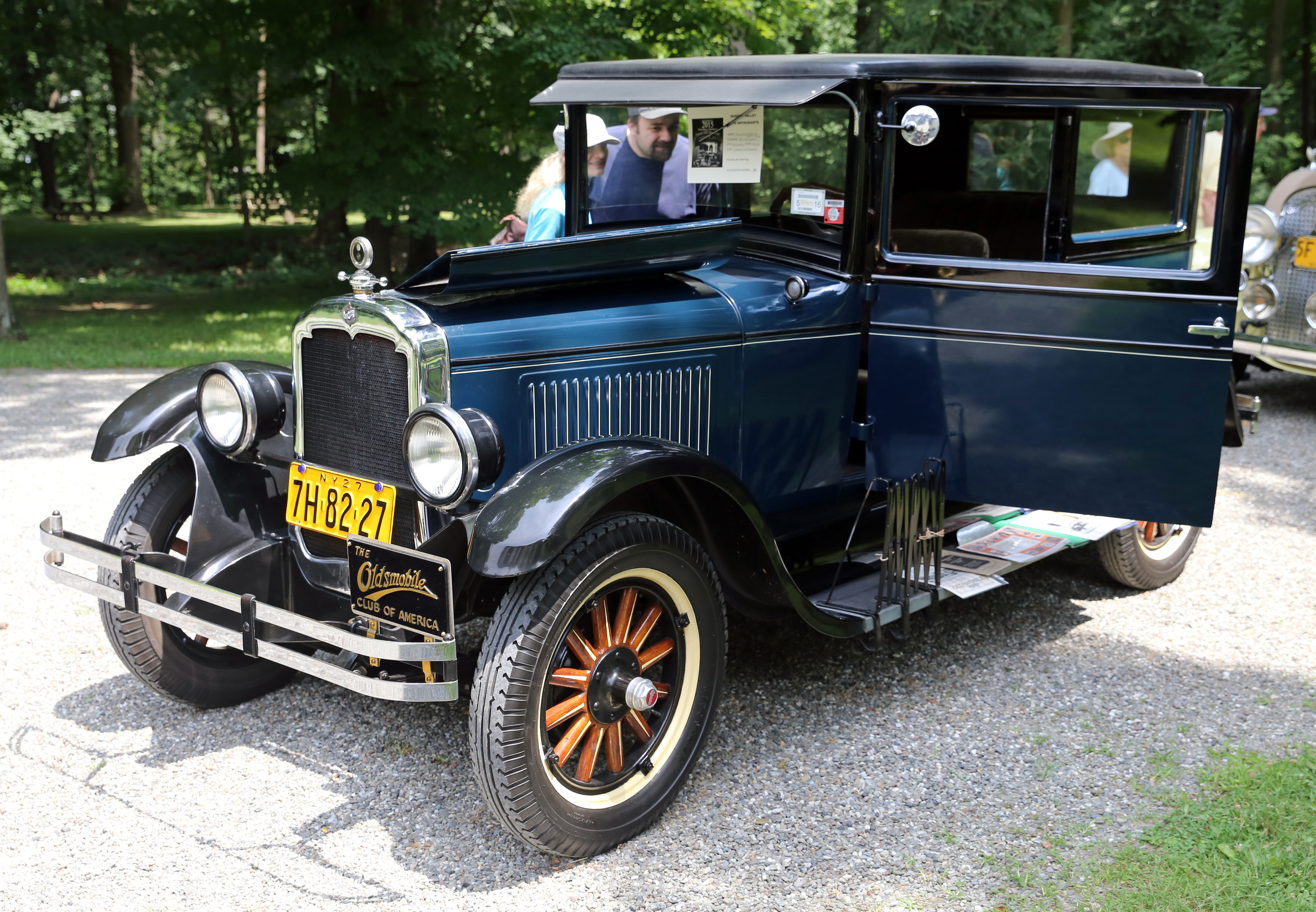
- 1927 Oldsmobile Model 30-ED2S 2-door deluxe sedan

Overview
- Manufacturer: Oldsmobile (General Motors)
- Production: Fisher Body; Detroit, Michigan
- Assembly: United States: Lansing, Michigan (Lansing Car Assembly)

Body and chassis
- Body style: Roadster; Two-door coupe; Four-door sedan
- Platform: GM A platform

Chronology
- Predecessor: Olds Six Series 37B
- Successor: Olds F-Series

The Oldsmobile Model 30, which continued to be known as the Oldsmobile Six, was a motorcar built by General Motors from 1923 through 1927. Each year it was built, it was given a new suffix 30-A, 30-B, 30-C, 30-D and 30-E for the last year of production, all having been manufactured in Lansing, Michigan.

General Motors used the GM A platform, shared with the Buick Standard Six and the Oakland Six, and the yearly changes were the result of a new business philosophy called planned obsolescence. The Model 30 was Oldsmobile mid-level product and introduced the flathead Oldsmobile straight-6 engine, while the Oldsmobile Model 43 with a four-cylinder engine remained the entry level product. When the top level Oldsmobile Light Eight, with the flathead Oldsmobile V8 engine was cancelled in 1923, the Oldsmobile Six became the top level vehicle. It replaced the Oldsmobile Model 37 introduced in 1917, and was replaced by the Oldsmobile F-Series introduced in 1928. In 5 years, 236,474 cars were built.

The growing popularity of GM's brands, like Oldsmobile, contributed to becoming the largest automobile manufacturer when sales overtook the Ford Motor Company during this time period. Coachwork for the various bodystyles were supplied by Fisher Body of Detroit, MI, and starting with the 1923 model year, all GM products adopted a shared appearance, with brand specific unique appearance features. The retail price had dropped considerably from previous years due to the popularity and affordability of the Ford Model T, with the top level sedan at US$1,095 ($20,692 in 2025 dollars).

== History ==
The Model 30-A was equipped with a side-valve, in-line 169 cu in (2,769 cc) six-cylinder engine developing 42 bhp. The Model 30 had a wheelbase of 110 in (2,794 mm) and was offered as a touring car, roadster, closed body sedan, and landaulet. It offered a technical advancement that was well received in that the handbrake lever and the gearshift were now installed in the center of the passenger compartment, while previous generations installed these controls on the outside right of the vehicle, allowing the driver to enter from either the right or left front doors, and the steering wheel was now installed on the left side for the first time.

The Model 30-B was for a brief time the only Oldsmobile offered for 1924 due to the 4-cylinder and 8-cylinder models being temporarily discontinued, and remained mechanically unchanged from the previous year. A 2-door Brougham joined the bodystyles offered.

The Model 30-C offered a modernized radiator, and the formerly nickel plated radiator surround was changed to chrome. Some optional features on previous models became standard items. Coachwork continued to be offered by Fisher Body who was the primary supplier of all GM products at this time, and Duco automotive lacquer paint, introduced by DuPont was the first quick drying multi-color line of nitrocellulose lacquers made especially for the automotive industry.

The Model 30-D offered a rounded hood and forward bulkhead ahead of the windshield, and for the first time, a two-tone paint option was offered. Mechanically it remained unchanged from previous years, and a 4-door landaulet bodystyle was offered. The wheels were now offered as a choice of the standard wooden spokes, with optional wire spokes or solid steel discs.

The Model 30-E offered a larger engine at 185 cu in (3,031 cc), and for the first time drum brakes were offered on all four wheels, while previous generations only offered drum brakes on the rear wheels. Eleven body styles were offered in open and closed configurations with prices starting at US$875 ($16,218 in 2025 dollars) to US$1075 ($19,925 in 2025 dollars).

== See also ==
- 1924 Cadillac Type V-63
- 1927 Buick Standard Six
- 1924 Oakland Six
- 1923 Chevrolet Superior
