= Oldsmobile Six =

Car model

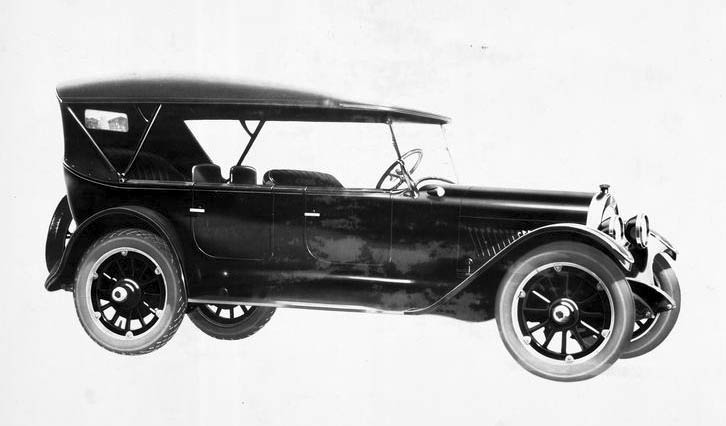
- 1914 Oldsmobile Model 54

Overview
- Manufacturer: General Motors
- Production: Fisher Body; Detroit, Michigan
- Model years: (1913-1915) (1917-1921)
- Assembly: United States: Lansing, Michigan (Lansing Car Assembly)

Body and chassis
- Body style: Roadster; Two-door coupe; Four-door sedan

Chronology
- Predecessor: Olds Series 28
- Successor: Olds Model 30

The Oldsmobile Six, also known as the Model 53, 54 and 55 (1913-1915) then a brief cancellation until it reappeared as the Model 37, 37A and 37B (1917-1921) was a top level sedan along with the Oldsmobile Series 40 junior vehicle produced by GM's Oldsmobile Division and was manufactured at Lansing Car Assembly in Lansing, Michigan. It replaced the Series 28 also known as the "Oldsmobile Autocrat" and was replaced by the Oldsmobile Model 30 in 1927, and shared wheelbases with the Buick Six. It continued to use the T-head engine for two years. The various bodystyles were supplied by Fisher Body of Detroit, MI. It competed with the Chevrolet Series C Classic Six as Chevrolet was an independent company before becoming a division in 1917. Oldsmobile also shared technology with GMC for commercial and industrial products.

== History ==
=== Original six ===
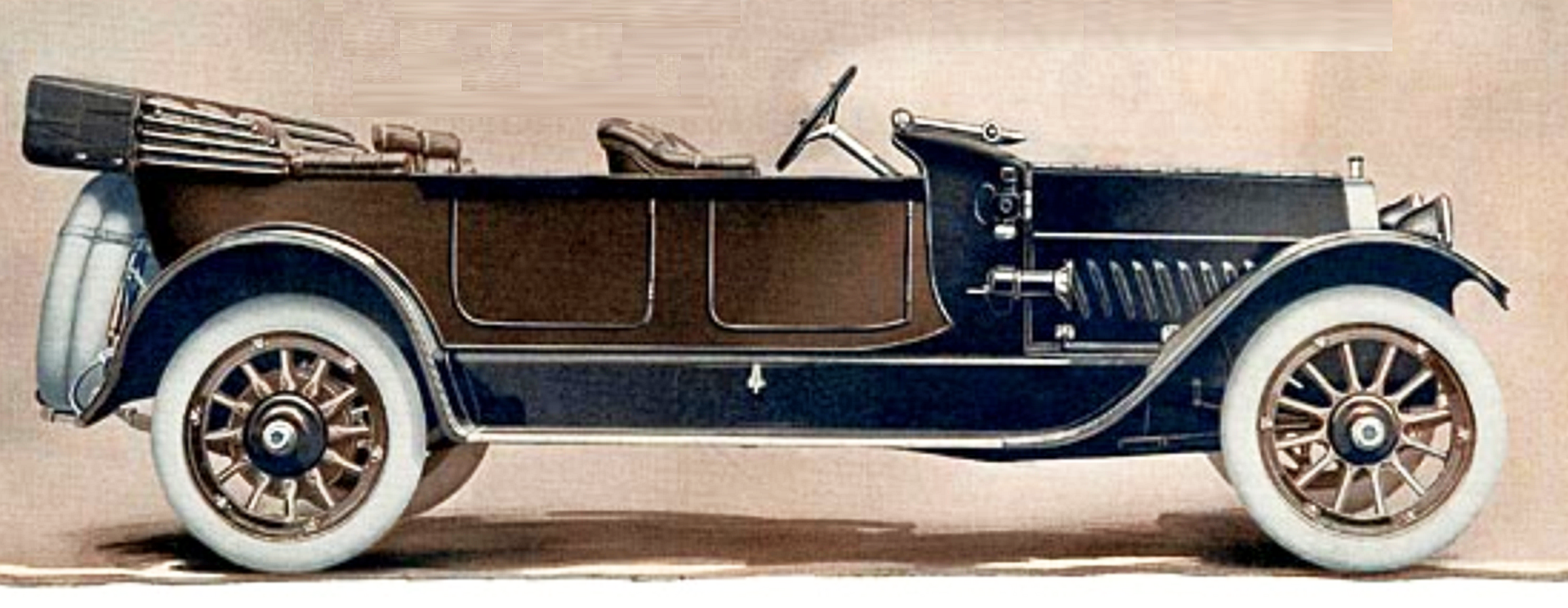
Oldsmobile-Six 1914 Model 54

The Model 53 was equipped with an enormous side-valve, in-line 380 cu in (6,227 cc) six-cylinder engine developing 50 bhp. It had a wheelbase of 132–139 in (3,353–3,531 mm) based on the bodystyle offered of a touring car, phaeton, or a four-door sedan, with the ability to accommodate between five and seven passengers. The Model 54 appearance was essentially unchanged from the Model 53, while the engine displacement increased to 447 cu in (7,325 cc) and the wheelbase was reduced to 132 in (3,353 mm). The retail price for the Model 54 with seven-passenger limousine coachwork was US$4,300 ($138,214 in 2025 dollars) which was close to the price of a Cadillac Type 51 and more than $1000 over a Buick Six. The Model 55 offered the most advancements, changing the steering wheel position from the right to the left side and relocating the handbrake and gearshift from the outside right to the middle of the passenger compartment. Around 500 units of the Six were made in 1913, and around 1,000 in 1914. In 1915 only 114 luxury tourers were made.

=== Reintroduction ===
The Oldsmobile Six was reintroduced in 1917 with a new designation, called the Model 37 as a senior platform to the Oldsmobile Light Eight, and was positioned below Buick where it would remain. The engine displacement was reduced to a more efficient 177 cu in (2,901 cc), and the overall size was reduced with a more manageable 110 in (2,805 mm). For a brief time as the four-cylinder Oldsmobile Model 43 was not offered, the Model 37 was Oldsmobile's entry-level product. 1918 saw the Model 37A with more bodystyle choices, adding a roadster, two-door coupe and four-door sedan, and a naming convention changed designating the Model 37B as closed body sedans and coupes, with a retail price of US$1,850 ($59,464 in 2025 dollars) for the closed body sedan. Starting in 1921, all models were again referred to as Model 37 until it was replaced by the updated Model 30. 59,938 of the 37/37A/37B models were produced in five years. Production was not interrupted when the United States entered World War I starting in 1917.

== See also ==
- Cadillac Type 51
- Buick Six
- Oakland Six
