= Duco =

Trade name for a line of DuPont lacquers

Duco was a trade name for a product line of automotive lacquer developed by the DuPont Company in the 1920s. Under the Duco brand, DuPont introduced the first quick drying multicolor line of nitrocellulose lacquers, made especially for the automotive industry. It was also used in paintings by the American artist Jackson Pollock.

It is now used by Nexa Autocolor — formerly ICI Autocolor and now a division of Pittsburgh-based PPG Industries — as a tradename for automotive enamels in Asia.

"Duco" is still used as an Australian colloquialism for automotive paint. It is currently widely used in the same way in Egypt (دوكو). It was (and partly still is) used in Hungarian as dukkó (noun) and dukkóz (verb). In Romania, the term was in use with the same meaning until 2000.

Duco was the finish applied to the National String Instrument Corporation brand of resonator guitars, c. 1930.

A DuPont Duco nitrocellulosic lacquer was also applied to early Fender Telecaster guitars ("butterscotch" or honey color): that ultra thin finish was a significant contributor to this guitar's specific resonance and sound.

Duco coated is used in the plumbing industry to describe lacquered floor drains and similar products.

== Other uses ==
Duco Cement is a brand of nitrocellulose all-purpose adhesive originally trademarked by DuPont and marketed in the U.S. by ITW Devcon.

An unrelated company with the same name designs and manufactures subsea umbilical cable systems. It is a subsidiary of the Technip Group, under the trademark Technip Umbilical Systems. The name Duco originated from Dunlop and Coflexip, when the Coflexip-Stena Offshore group acquired the subsea umbilical systems activity of the Dunlop group. The company has four locations: Newcastle (UK), Houston (US), Lobito (Angola), and Tanjung Langsat (Malaysia).
