= Oldsmobile straight-8 engine =

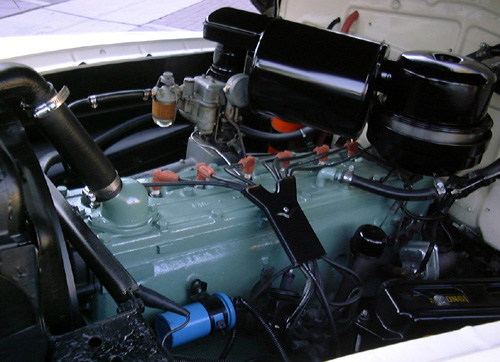
1948 Oldsmobile Straight-8 engine

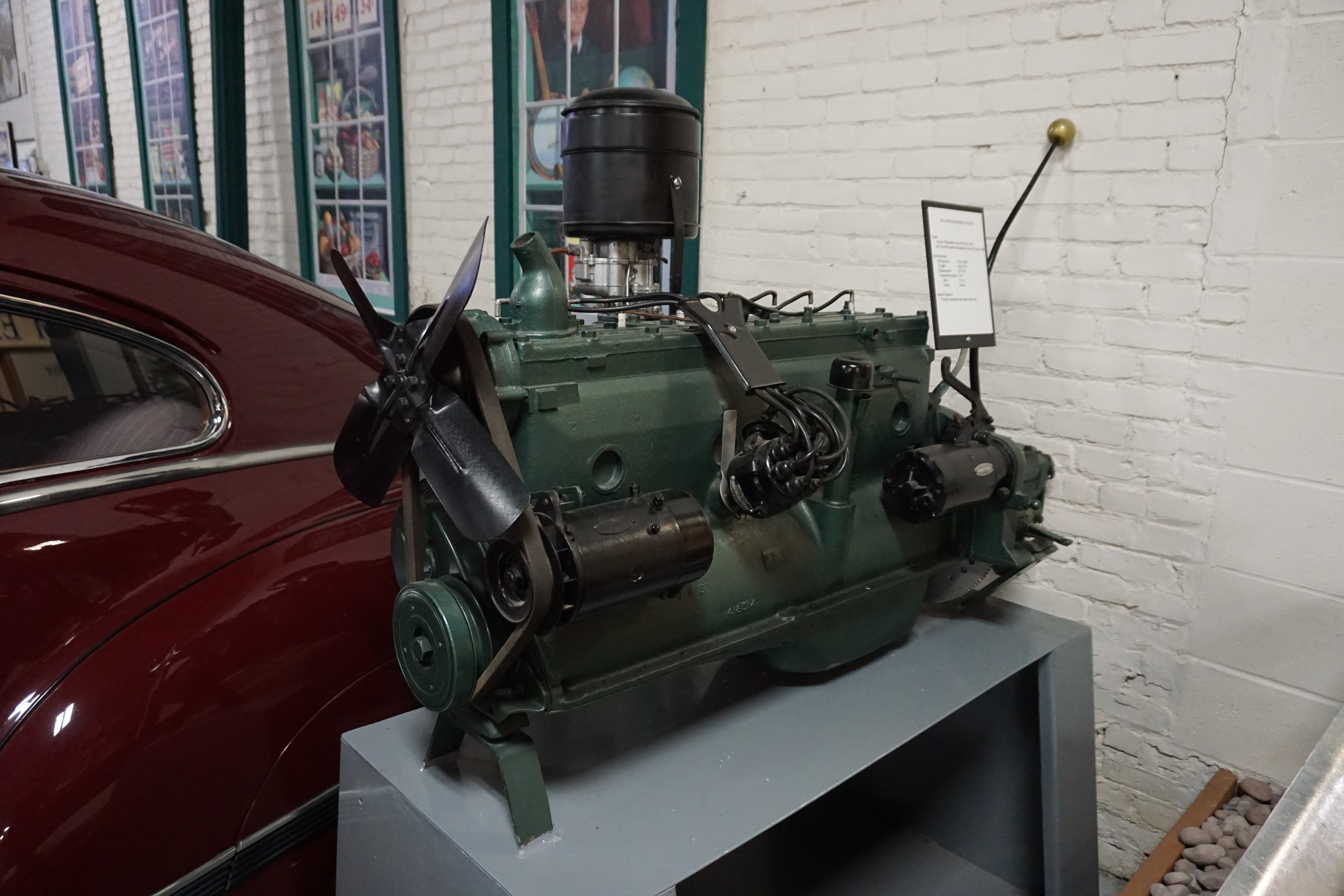
Oldsmobile inline 8 engine at the R. E. Olds Transportation Museum

Oldsmobile produced a straight-8 engine in the 1930s and 1940s. This was the company's top engine choice from 1932 until the 1949 introduction of the overhead valve Rocket V8, and was briefly exclusive to the Oldsmobile L-Series.

== 240 ==
This first version of the Oldsmobile straight-8 was 240.4 cu in (3.9 L). It was a conventional side-valve engine which started off life in 1932 with 87 bhp at 3350 rpm. This initial variant ran for 5 years, from its introduction in 1932 until the larger 257 was introduced in 1937. In 1933 the power was increased to 90 bhp and then to 100 hp in 1935 until its phasing out in 1937. 1933 also saw the introduction of removable "shell" bearings in lieu of the earlier "poured in place" babbit bearings. These early Oldsmobile straight eights have the distributor mounted on the cylinder head whereas the later 257.1 engine has it mounted down on the left side of the engine. This series of engine was shared with the LaSalle during the 1934–1936 period, but its variant had a slightly increased capacity at 248 cubic inches.

== 257 ==
This second variant of the Oldsmobile straight-8 was 257 cubic inches (4.2 L). It was also a conventional side-valve engine with 110 bhp at 3600 rpm, and 210 pound-feet of torque at 2000 rpm. This variant of the 8 cylinder Olds engine ran for 11 years. A later version of the engine raised compression from 6.50 to 7, the result being 115 bhp at 3600 rpm, and 218 pound-feet of torque at 2000 rpm.

== See also ==
- Pontiac straight-8 engine
- Buick straight-8 engine
- Oldsmobile straight-6 engine
- Oldsmobile V8 engine
- List of GM engines
