= Oakland Motor Car Company =

Michigan carmaker and division of General Motors, active 1908-1931

Coordinates: 42.6625501°N 83.2893976°W

Oakland
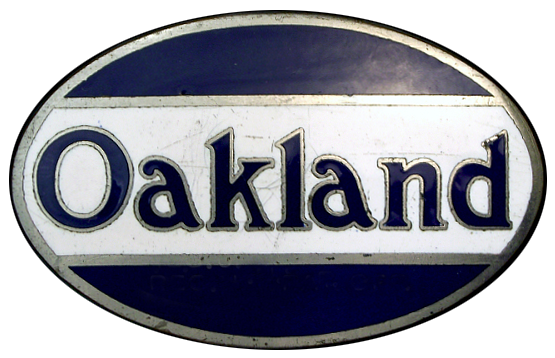
- Type: Private (1907–09); Division (1909–31)
- Industry: Automotive
- Genre: Touring cars Automobile engines
- Founded: 1907; 119 years ago
- Defunct: 1931; 95 years ago
- Fate: Acquired by General Motors in 1909, became a brand, then replaced by Pontiac
- Headquarters: Pontiac, Michigan, United States
- Area served: United States
- Key people: Edward Murphy, President; Alanson Brush, Chief Engineer
- Products: Automobiles; Automotive parts
- Parent: General Motors

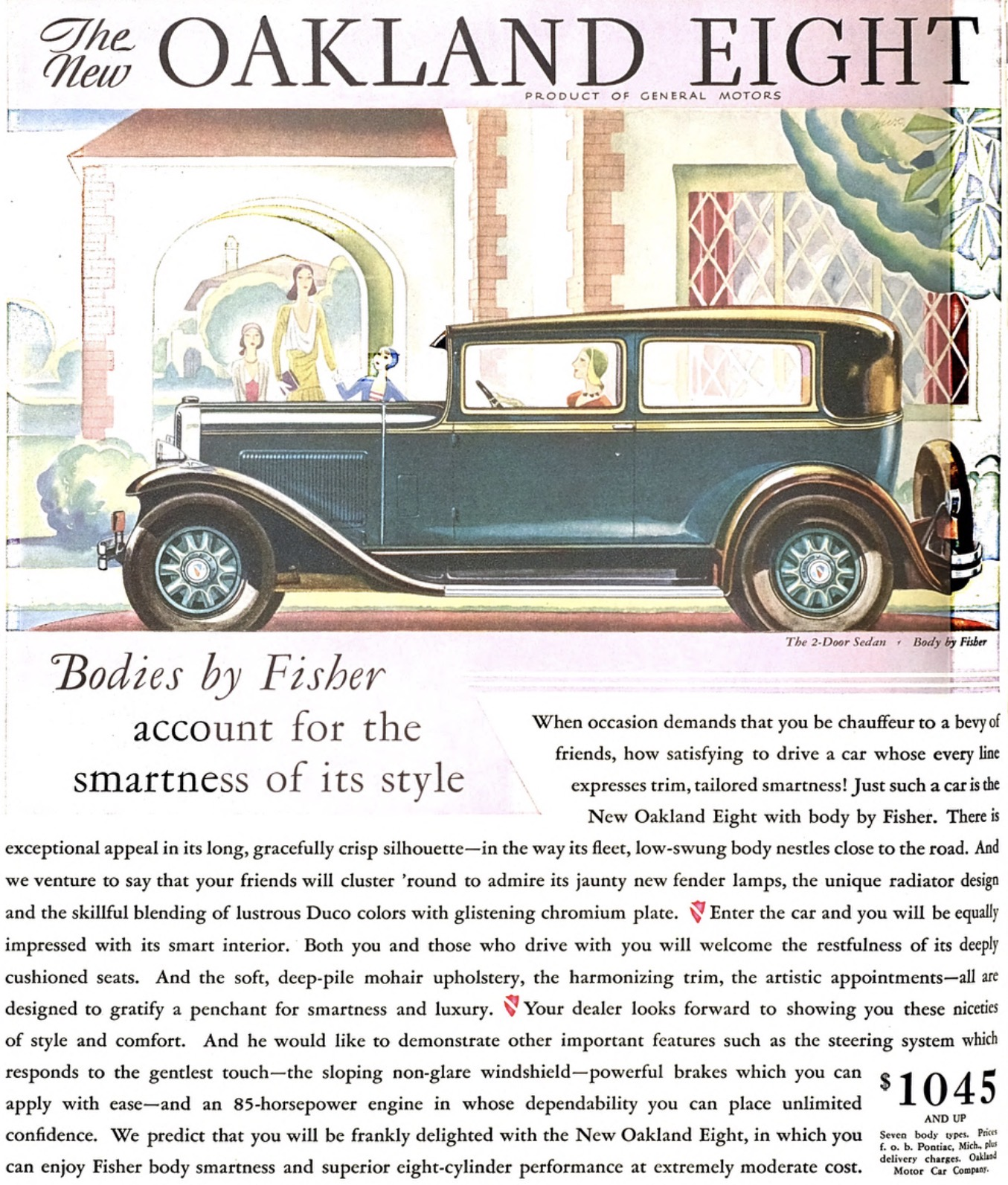
Oakland Eight (1930-1931) Model 101

The Oakland Motor Car Company was an American automobile manufacturer and later division of General Motors in operation from 1907 to 1931. Located in Pontiac, Michigan, it was purchased by General Motors in 1909 and continued to produce modestly priced automobiles until 1931 when the brand was dropped in favor of the division's Pontiac brand.

== Beginning ==
The Oakland Motor Company was created by Edward Murphy, who owned the Pontiac Buggy Company, and Alanson Brush, inventor of the single-cylinder Cadillac and Brush Runabout, who was working as a consultant in Detroit after leaving Cadillac. It was named for Oakland County, Michigan, in which it was based. As originally conceived and introduced, the first Oakland used a design created by Brush and presented to Murphy, who liked the idea and decided to go into business. It included a vertical two-cylinder engine that rotated counterclockwise, originally presented to Cadillac and rejected, and a planetary transmission.

The 1908 Oakland came in five body styles, designated Model A–E, varying from a runabout to a landaulet. A total of 278 vehicles were produced that year.

== GM Division ==
After one year of production, Oakland's principal founder, Edward Murphy, sold half of the company to William C. Durant's General Motors Corporation in early 1909. When Murphy died in the summer of 1909, GM acquired the remaining rights to Oakland. Within General Motors, Oakland was later slotted as their entry-level brand below the more expensive Oldsmobile, Buick, and Cadillac cars. Conventional four-cylinder engined models were introduced shortly after the GM takeover, and GM didn't acquire the volume-priced Chevrolet until 1917, and Oakland found itself competing with the Ford Model T introduced in October 1908. Once GM assumed operations of Oakland, production was moved to the factory that manufactured Cartercar in Pontiac, Michigan, another Durant acquisition that was cancelled while the resources were newly utilized, and the Oakland Model 40 was introduced. Starting with 1910 Oakland was exclusively offering 4-cylinder flathead engines with five different wheelbases and their advertising slogan was "The Car with a Conscience". By early 1920, however, production and quality control problems began to plague the division. In 1921, under new general manager Fred Hannum, a consistent production schedule was underway and the quality of the cars improved, and Oakland vehicles shared the GM A platform used by Chevrolet. One marketing tactic was the employment of a quick-drying bright blue automotive lacquer by Duco (a DuPont brand product), leading to the slogan "True Blue Oakland Six".

=== Oakland Six and V8 ===
In 1913 the Oakland Six was introduced followed in 1916 by the Model 50 365 cu in (6.0 L) flathead V8 engine sourced from Northway Motor and Manufacturing company, and production soared to 35,000 in 1917. The Series 50 V8 used a flathead design shared with the Oldsmobile Light Eight and the Cadillac Type 51. The Model 50 was only available from 1915 to 1917 as a seven-passenger touring sedan on a 127" wheelbase and was listed at US$1,600 ($47,339 in 2025 dollars). The Oakland 34-C of 1921 and 1922 used a six-cylinder engine with 4894 cc with a 71.4 mm bore and 120.6 mm stroke. The wheelbase was 2920 mm. The petrol tank held 50 litres.

In 1930, Oakland reintroduced the Model 101 V8, again using a flathead architecture, on a 117" wheelbase and offered it as a roadster, phaeton, coupe, closed body sedan and sport coupe. Prices were listed at US$895 ($17,249 in 2025 dollars) for the roadster or phaeton to US$1,045 ($20,140 in 2025 dollars) for the Custom Sedan. The Oakland V8 was shared with the Viking V8 which was a companion of Oldsmobile and was the only product sold. 1931 was the last year for the Oakland Model 301 V8 and the only vehicle available was the V8 with very few changes, and was renamed the 1932 Pontiac Series 302 V8. The 1932 V8 had an oversquare bore and stroke of 3.4375 in (87.3 mm) x 3.375 in (85.7 mm) displacing 251 cu in (4.1 L) with a compression ratio of 5.2:1. Horsepower was rated at 85 @3200 RPM using three main bearings, solid valve lifters and a Marvel one barrel carburetor. Unusually, Pontiac switched to the straight-eight for 1933 until it was replaced in 1954.

| Year | Production | Model |
|---|---|---|
| 1908 | 278 | |
| 1909 | 1,035 | |
| 1910 | 4,049 | |
| 1911 | 3,386 | |
| 1912 | 5,838 | |
| 1913 | 8,618 | |
| 1914 | 6,105 | |
| 1915 | 11,952 | |
| 1916 | 25,675 | |
| 1917 | 33,171 | |
| 1918 | 27,757 | |
| 1919 | 52,124 | |
| 1920 | 34,839 | |
| 1921 | 12,852 | |
| 1922 | 19,636 | |
| 1923 | 35,847 | |
| 1924 | 37,080 | |
| 1925 | 44,642 | |
| 1926 | 56,909 | |
| 1927 | 53,009 | |
| 1928 | 40,883 | 212 |
| 1929 | 22,866 | 212 |
| 1930 | 24,443 | 101 |
| 1931 | 8,672 | 101 |

== Pontiac joins Oakland then replaces Oakland ==
As General Motors entered the 1920s, the product ladder started with the price-leading Chevrolet marque, and then progressed upward in price, power, and luxury to Oakland, Oldsmobile, Buick, and ultimately Cadillac. By 1921, over 200,000 Oaklands had been produced. By the mid-1920s, a sizable price gap existed between Chevrolet and Oakland, as well as a wide gap between Oldsmobile and Buick. Also, a product gap existed between Buick and Cadillac. General Motors pioneered the idea that consumers would aspire to buy up an automotive product ladder if a company met certain price points-called the Companion Make Program. To address this, General Motors authorized the introduction of four brands priced and designed to fill the gaps. Cadillac would introduce the LaSalle to fill the gap between Cadillac and Buick. Buick would introduce the Marquette to handle the upper end of the gap between Buick and Oldsmobile. Oldsmobile would introduce the Viking, which took care of the lower end of the same gap.

Oakland's part in this plan was the 1926 Pontiac, a shorter-wheelbase "light six" priced to sell at a four-cylinder car's price point, but still above Chevrolet. Pontiac was the first of the companion marques introduced, and in its first year sold 49,875 units. By 1929, GM sold 163,000 more Pontiacs than Oaklands. The discontinuation of Oakland was announced with the onset of the Great Depression in 1931. Pontiac was the only companion make to survive beyond 1940, or to survive its "parent" make.

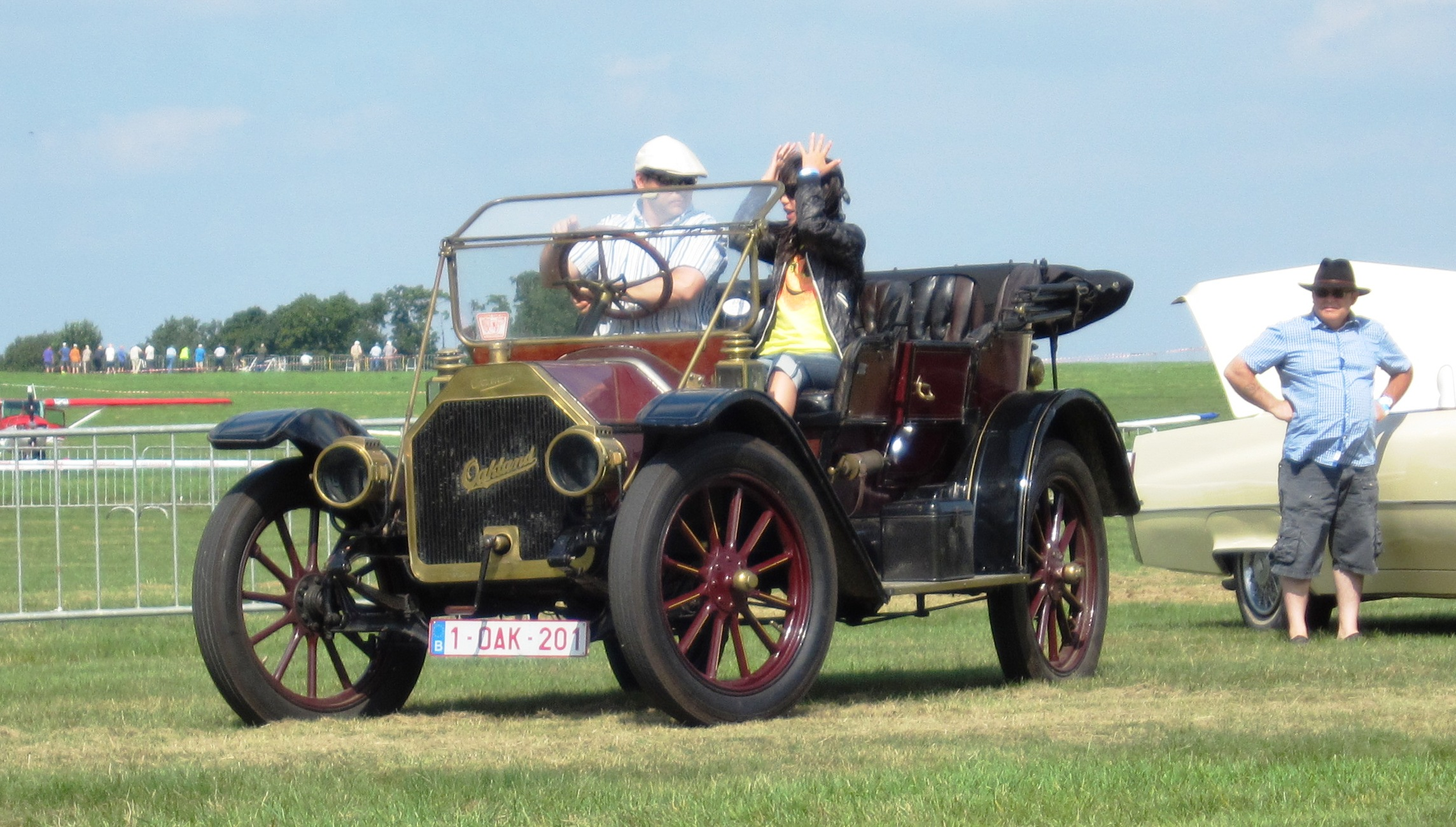
1909 Oakland Model 40

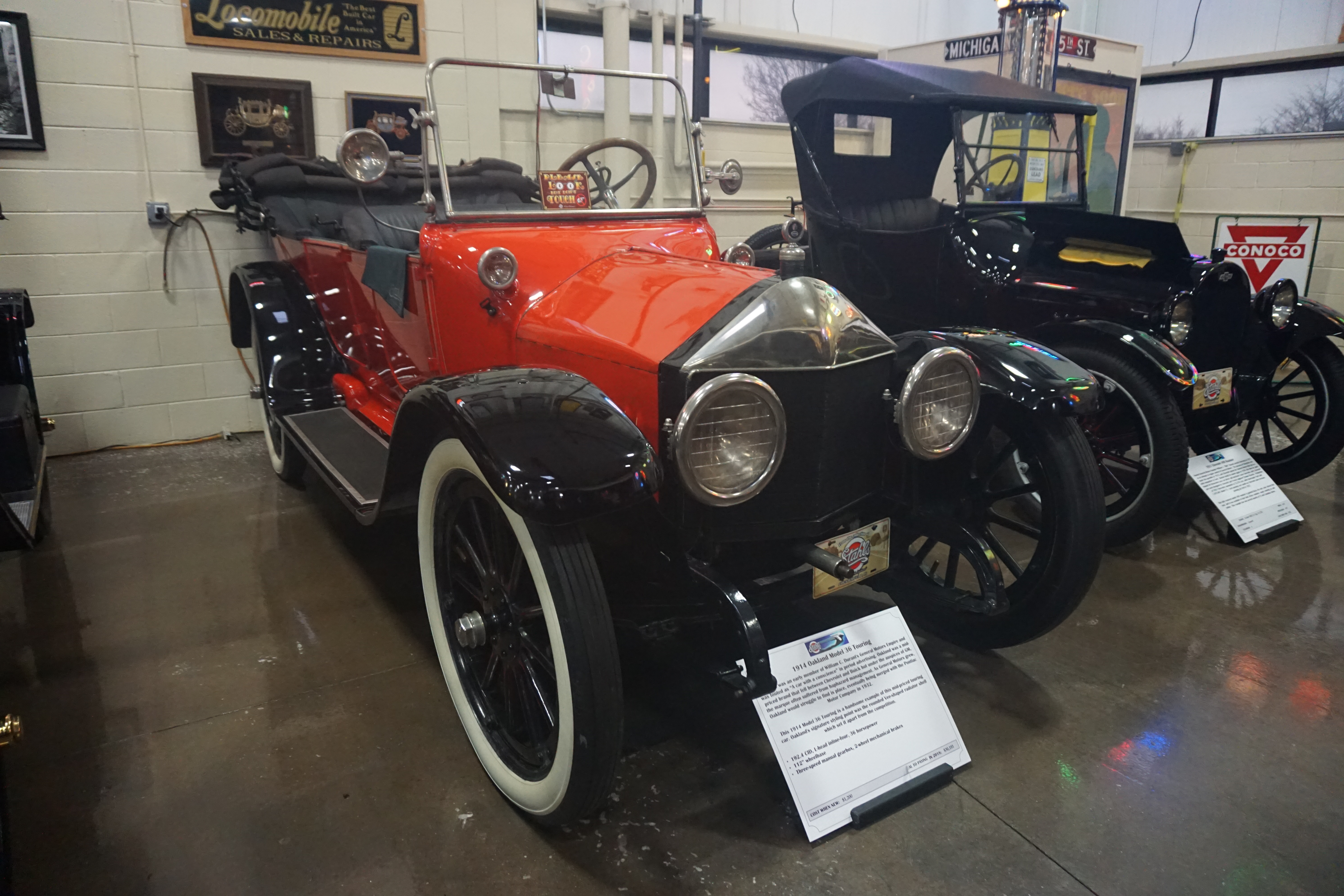
1914 Oakland Model 36 Touring

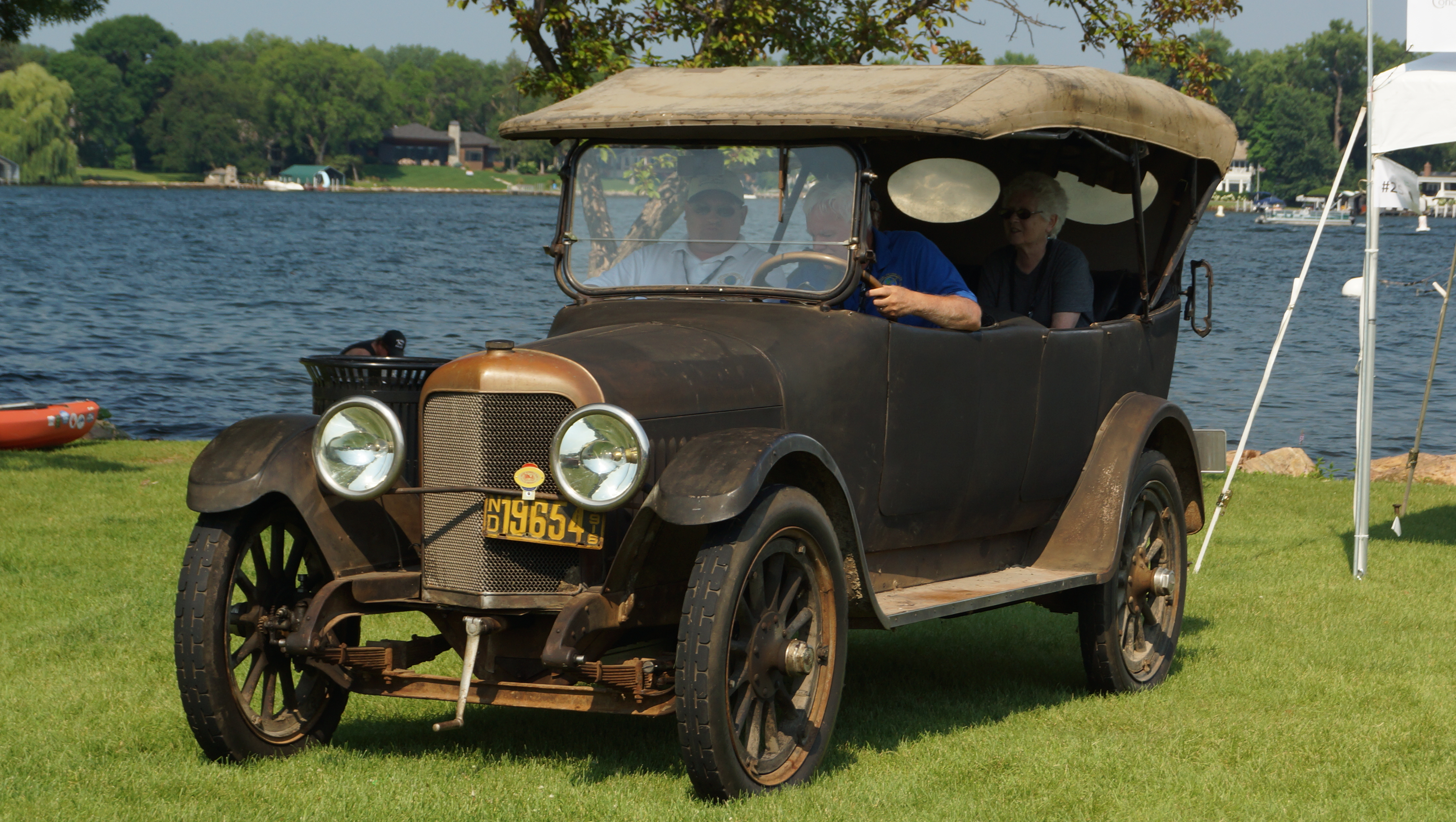
1916 Oakland Model 50 V8

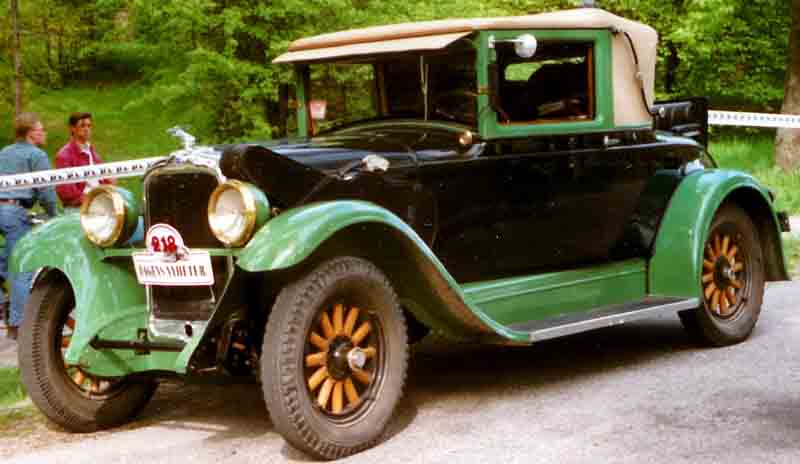
1928 Oakland Model 212 All-American Sport Cabriolet

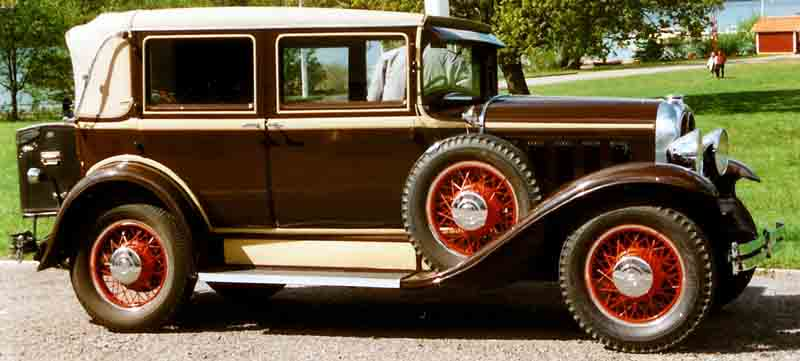
1929 Oakland Model 212 All-American Landaulette Sedan

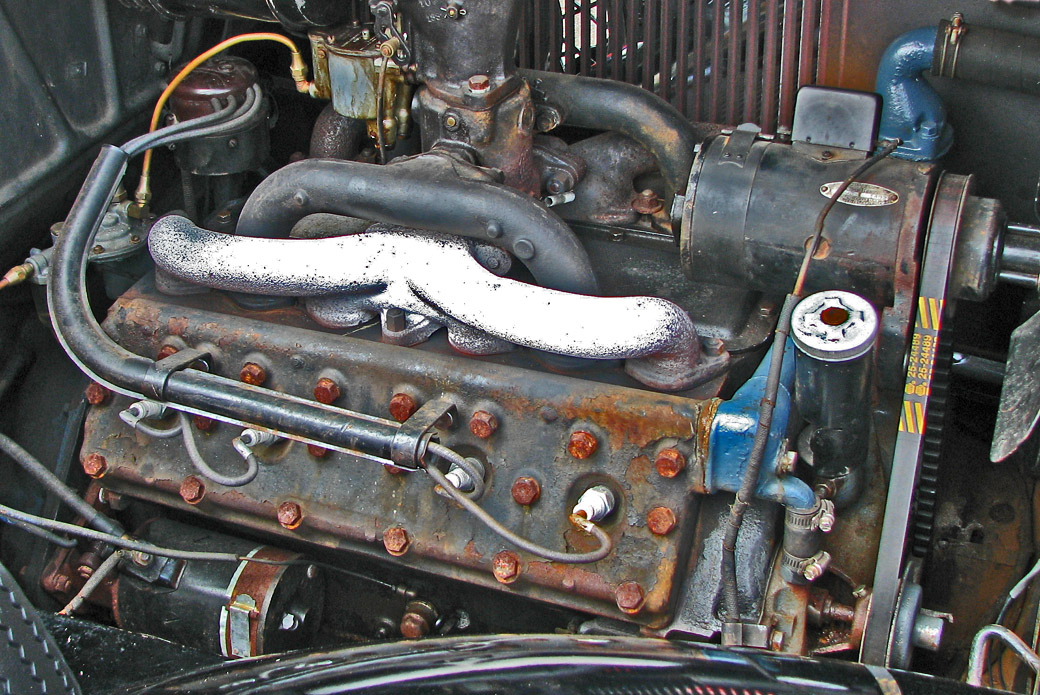
1931 Oakland V8

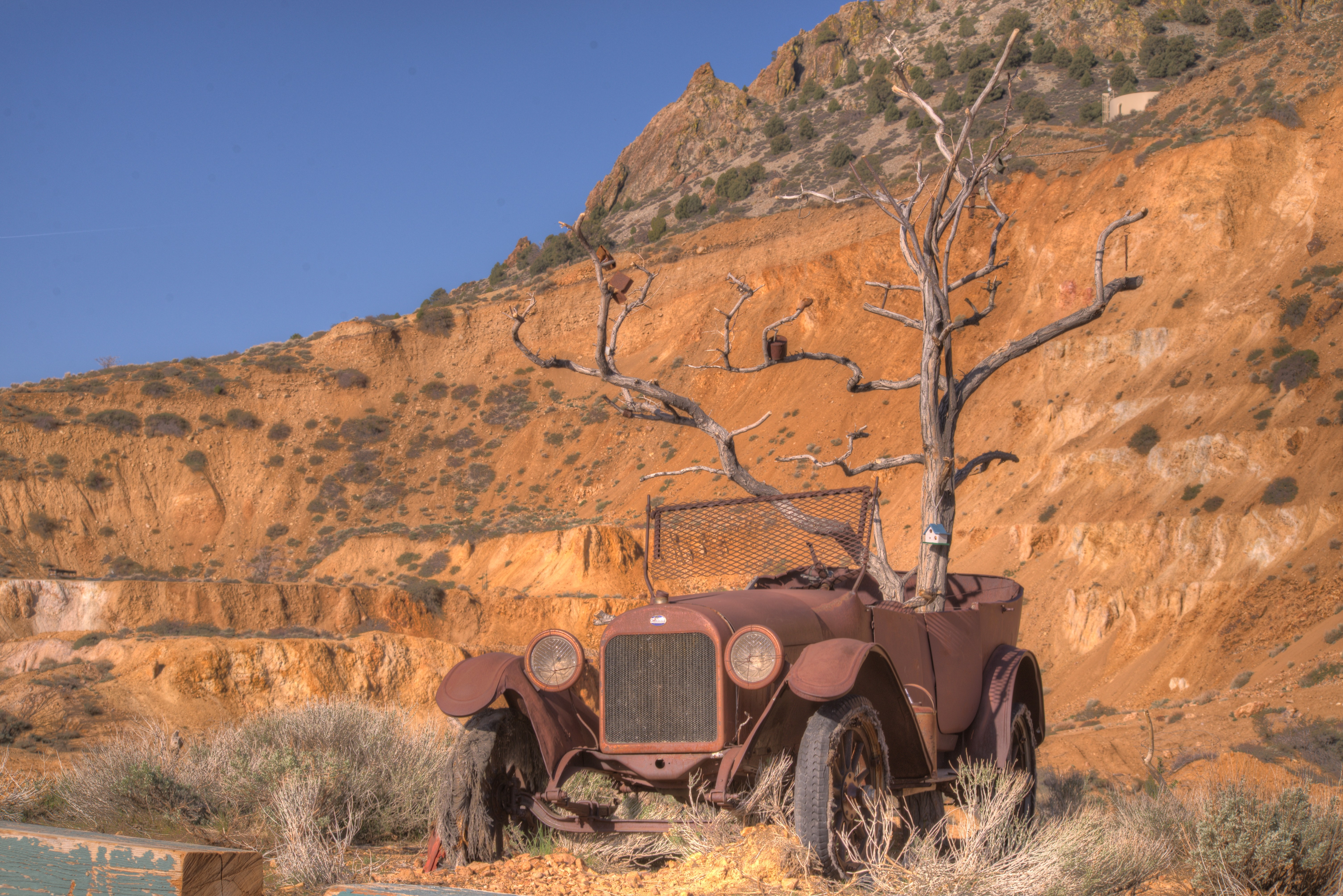
The Oakland Tree in Virginia City, Nevada
