= Oldsmobile Light Eight =

Car model

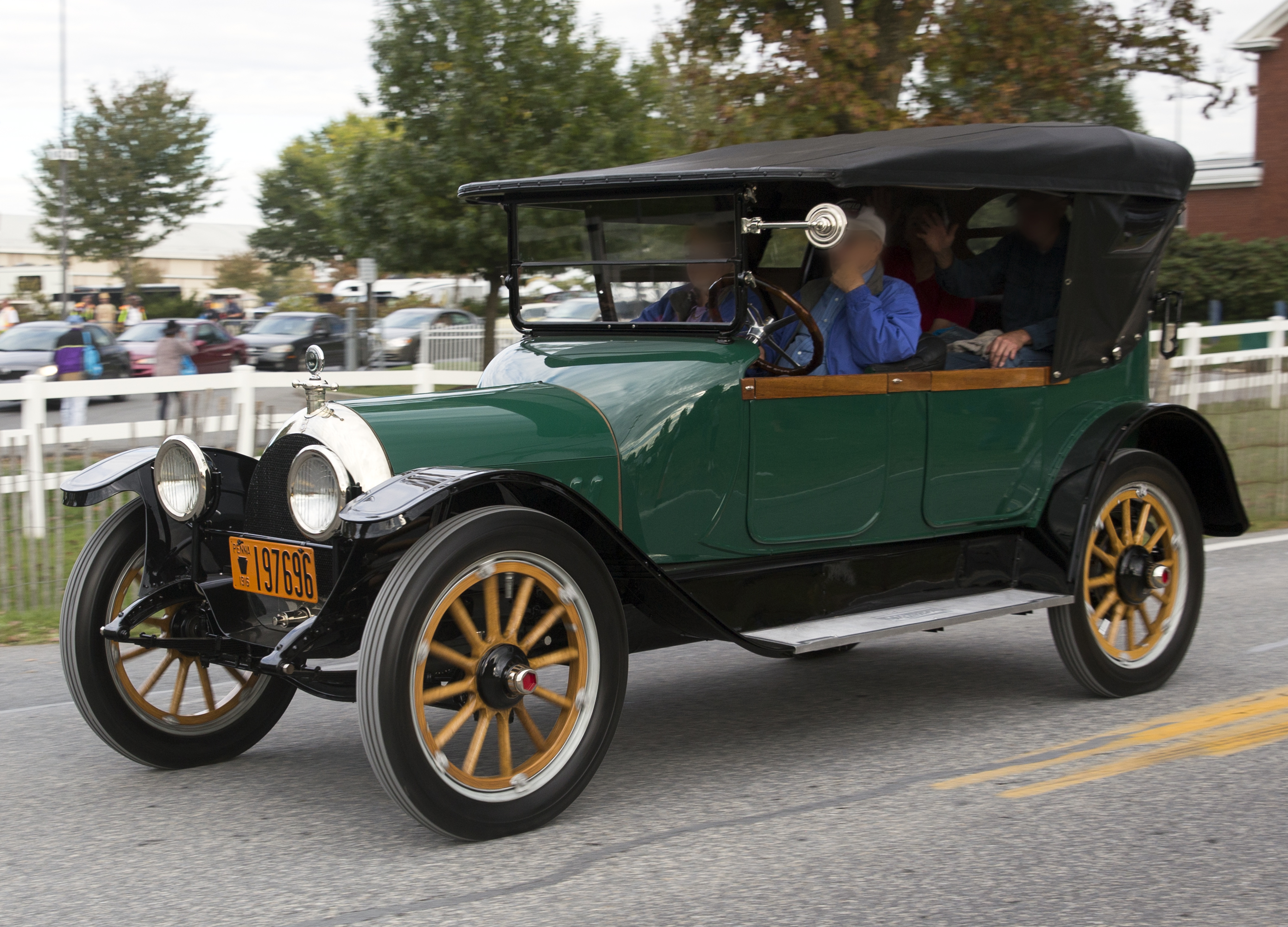
- 1916 Oldsmobile Light Eight Model 44 Touring Sedan

Overview
- Manufacturer: Oldsmobile (General Motors)
- Production: Fisher Body; Detroit, Michigan
- Assembly: United States: Lansing, Michigan (Lansing Car Assembly)

Body and chassis
- Body style: Roadster; Two-door coupe; Four-door sedan

Chronology
- Successor: Oldsmobile L-Series

The Oldsmobile Light Eight was an automobile produced by the Oldsmobile Division of General Motors in roadster, two-door coupe, four-door sedan from between 1916 and 1923. It was powered by a sidevalve V8 engine, the maker's first, and shared with the 1916 Oakland Model 50.

The Light Eight was an all new platform, and was produced at the Lansing Car Assembly, with its engine sourced from Northway Engine Works. and coachwork supplied by Fisher Body. It shared wheelbases with the Buick Six, and was more expensive than the market favorite Ford Model T, but offered the durability of a V8 and a wider range of bodystyles.

The Light Eight was replaced by the General Motors Companion Make Program Viking introduced in 1929 and the Oldsmobile L-Series.

== First Generation Model 44, 45, 45A ==
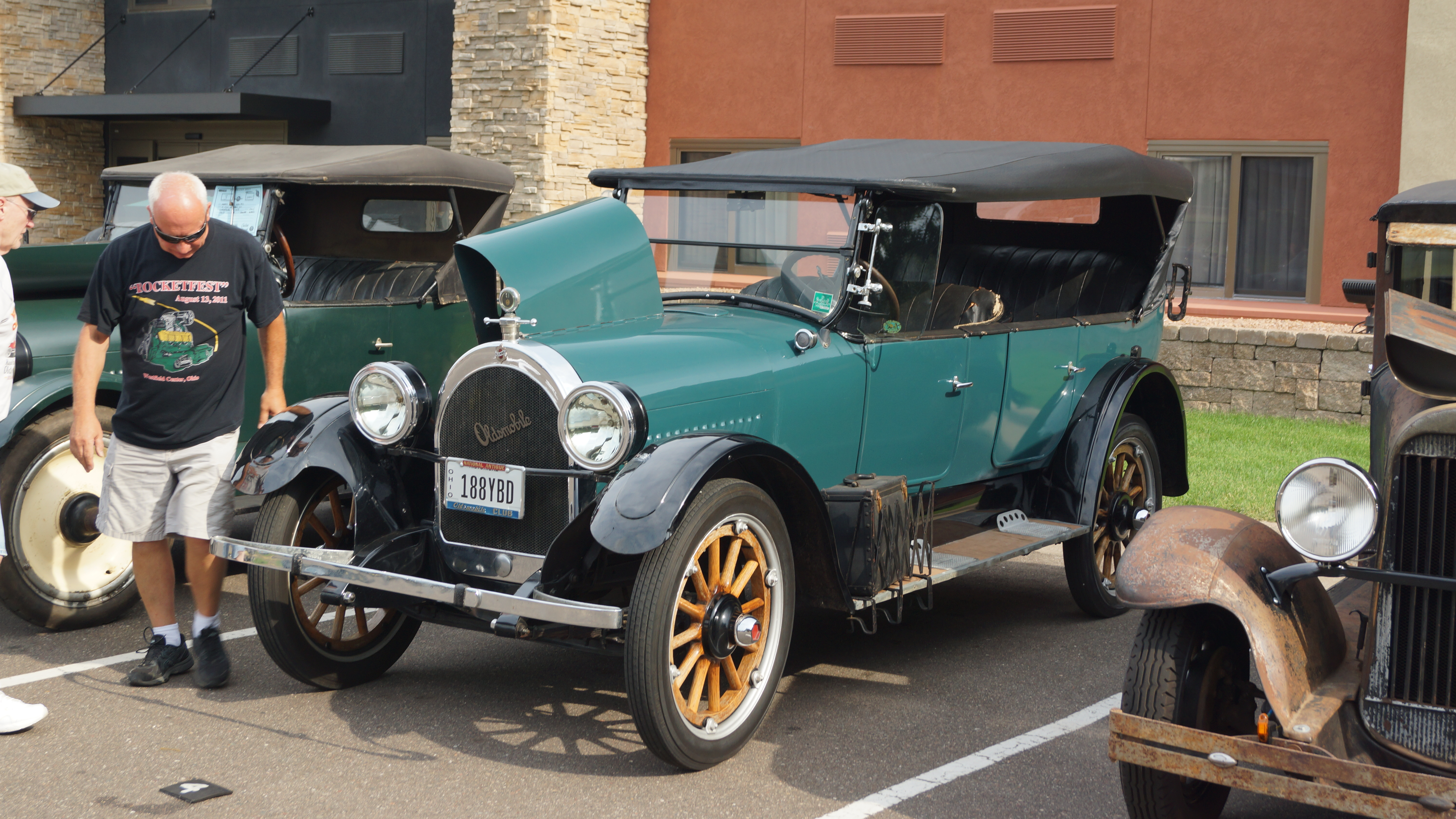
1918 Oldsmobile Touring Sedan

The 1916 Model 44 was equipped with a Northway designed side-valve, 246 cu in (4,031 cc) V8 developing 40 bhp. The engine had a bore and stroke of 2.875 in (73.0 mm) x 4.75 in (120.7 mm) displacing 246 cu in (4.0 L). Horsepower was rated at 40 @2000 RPM using two main bearings.

This generation had a wheelbase of 120 in (3,048 mm) and was offered as a closed body sedan, roadster, coupe and convertible on a chassis it shared with the Oldsmobile Model 43. Mechanical brakes were installed on the rear wheels using hickory wooden spoked wheels. The touring car and roadster didn't have side windows, while the convertible and sedan were offered as closed body options built by Fisher Body and side windows installed that retracted into the doors. The 1917 Model 45 saw an improvement to the engine that developed 58 bhp, while the 1918 Model 45A added 7 seat capacity to the touring sedan. In 1919, only the open sided roadster and touring sedan were offered. Sales were a success, having sold 35,203 in four years. Retail price for a 4-door sedan was US$1,595($47,192 in 2025 dollars), while the Oldsmobile Six Model 37 sedan was listed at retail price of US$1,850 ($59,464 in 2025 dollars).

== Second Generation Model 45B, 46 ==
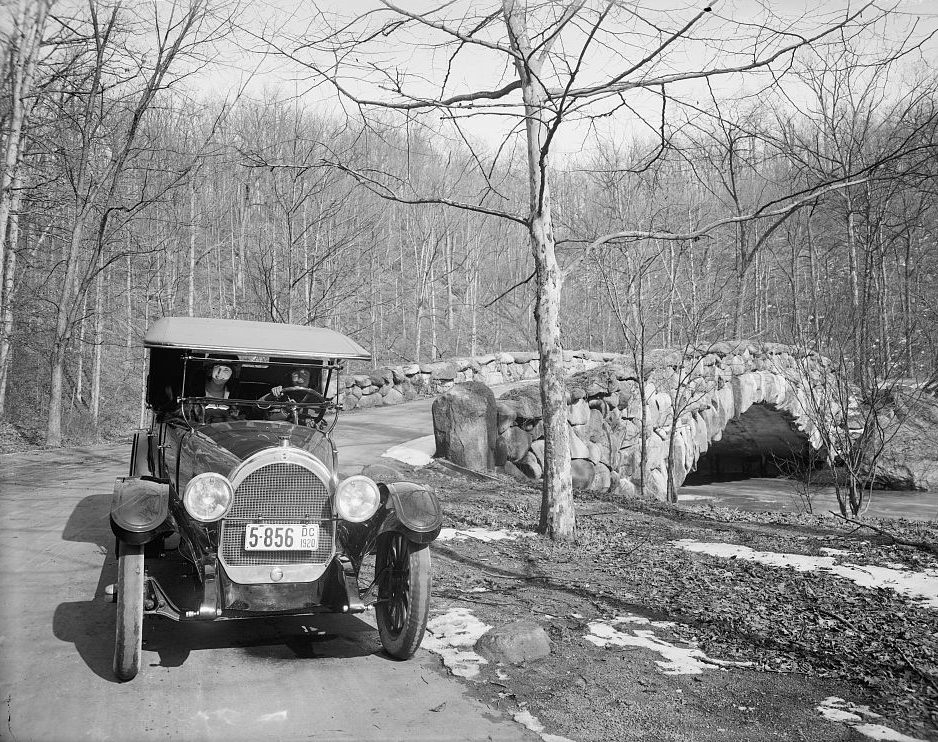
1919 Oldsmobile Model 45B Touring Sedan

The 1919 Model 45B was offered with a longer wheelbase of 122 in (3,099 mm) as a longer version of the 45A with the same side-valve, 246 cu in (4,031 cc) V8 and was introduced as the Pacemaker Series. For 1920, the shorter wheelbase model was discontinued, and the longer 45B was available only as either open sided touring sedan or the closed body 4-door sedan that could seat 5-7 passengers, and identified as the Thorobred Series. The Model 46 appeared in 1921 and 1922 with minor changes but mechanically unchanged. The Hillbillies truck, featured in almost every episode of The Beverly Hillbillies, was a cut-down 1921 Oldsmobile Model 46 Roadster.

== Third Generation Model 47 ==
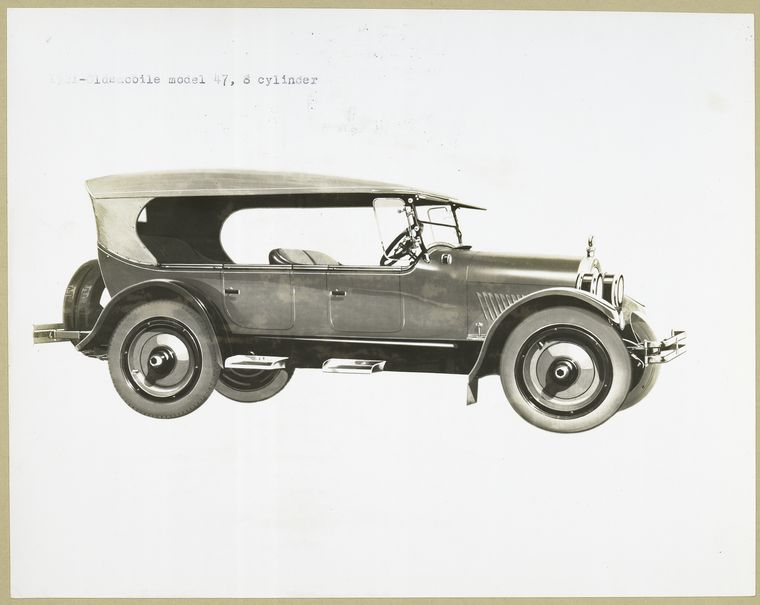
1921 Oldsmobile Model 47 Touring Sedan

The 1921-23 Model 47 was offered with a short wheelbase of 115 in (2,921 mm) with an Oldsmobile designed side-valve, 233 cu in (3,818 cc) V8 and was changed to an aluminum block with a bore and stroke of 2.875 in (73.0 mm) x 4.5 in (114.3 mm). Horsepower was rated at 63 @2000 RPM using two main bearings, along with the longer wheelbase version. For 1922, the roadster bodystyle returned along with the popular touring sedan and closed body sedan. The 1923 model saw the cancellation of the long wheelbase. The sidevalve V8 was replaced by the Oldsmobile Straight-8 engine and the division wouldn't offer another V8 until 1949.

== See also ==
- Cadillac Type 51
- Buick Six
- Oakland Six
- Chevrolet Series FB
