= Rainier Motor Car Company =

Defunct American motor vehicle manufacturer

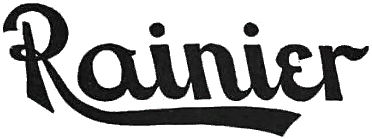
- The Pullman of Motor Cars
- Type: Private (1905–09); Subsidiary (1909–11)
- Industry: Automotive
- Genre: luxury passenger car
- Founded: 1905; 121 years ago
- Founder: John T. Rainier
- Defunct: 1911; 115 years ago
- Fate: Purchased by General Motors, discontinued in 1911
- Headquarters: Flushing, Queens, United States
- Key people: John T. Rainier, James G. Heaslet, Paul Lineberger
- Products: Automobiles, parts
- Parent: General Motors

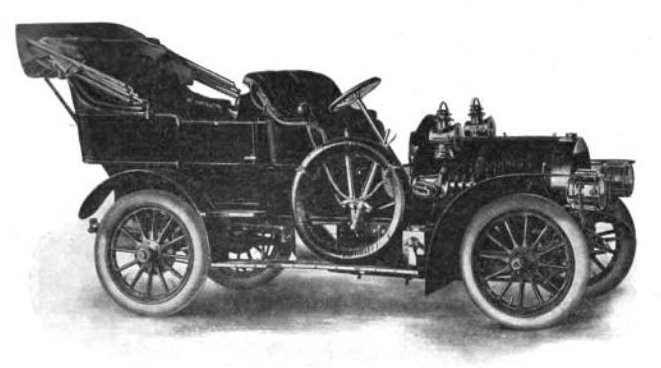
1906 Rainier Model B from advertisement

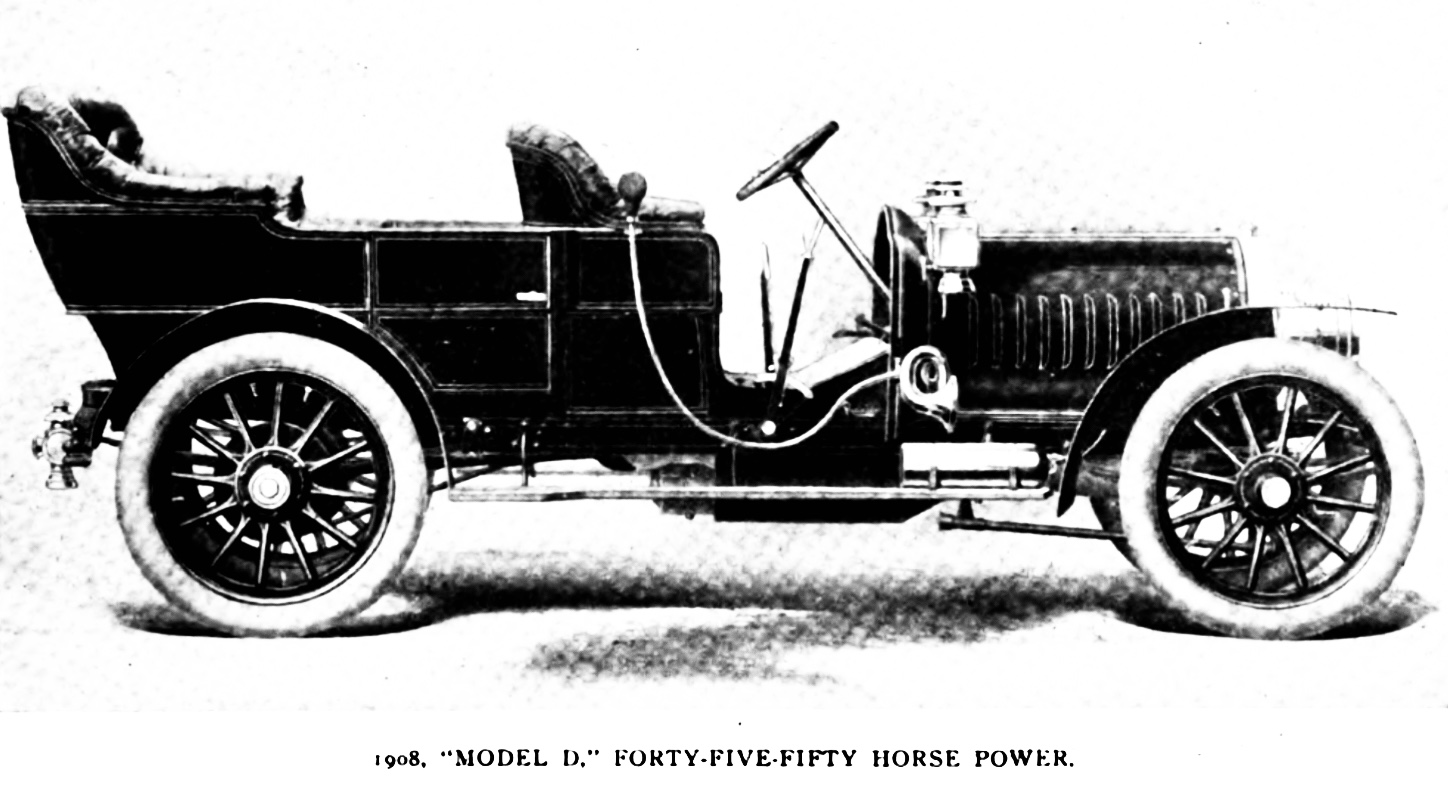
1908 Rainier Model D from advertisement

Rainier advertisement (1918)

Rainier Motor Car Company was an American automobile manufacturer founded in 1905 by John T. Rainier in Flushing, New York and from 1908 produced in Saginaw, Michigan. The company specialized in manufacturing large and luxurious automobiles. In 1909, the company was bought by General Motors who maintained the brand until 1911.

== History ==
Rainiers were big, conventional and solidly built powerful automobiles. They earned local success with hill climbs and mountain races. The company was also one of the first who offered a limited one-year guarantee on "use without repair expenses".

They were first headquartered in John Rainier's dealership for Vehicle Equipment (V .E.) Automobiles. James G. Heaslet became chief engineer for Rainier, a position which he held for the whole time of production.

Rainiers received their final assembly in Flushing. Chassis were delivered by the Garford Company of Elyria, Ohio which specialized in automobile components and built chassis for several car manufacturers, most prominently Studebaker.

During 1907 it became obvious that Garford and Studebaker would intensify their cooperation and that delivery of frames for Rainier was not secure. Rainier decided to build its cars completely in-house. A new plant was erected in Saginaw, Michigan which already was considered an early center of automobile manufacturing. It opened in time for the production of 1908 models.

Rainier during the Panic of 1907 was hit by a cash shortage. After the assembly of 300 automobiles in Saginaw, Rainier was petitioned into involuntary bankruptcy because as General Manager Paul Lineberger explained, there was not enough cash to meet wages and material cost, even though assets were in excess of liabilities. The company was auctioned on January 25, 1909, and went for $20,000 to attorney George C. Comstock who represented John Rainier. John Rainer could not raise the money to save his business, and William C. Durant bought it from Comstock for General Motors.

GM organized the Marquette Motor Company in Saginaw to manufacture the Rainier and parts for the other recently acquired luxury car, the Welch Motor Car Company and it's less expensive companion make, the Welch-Detroit. Marquette business was under the control of GM's Buick Motor Company management. In September, 1910, Durant had to leave GM after financial trouble arose after his aggressive policy of acquisitions of many companies.

GM management practiced a course of consolidation which led to the demise of several makes including the Welch. The Rainer automobile was produced until 1911, then production of the Welch-Detroit, was transferred from Pontiac, Michigan to Rainier's Saginaw factory.

For 1912 a last attempt was tried by developing new models that used parts of both the Welch-Detroit Model S, 45/50 HP, and the Rainier Model F, 50 HP. They were marketed as the Marquette 40 HP and 45 HP, respectively, and sold for prices that started at $3,000 and $4,000. The very last cars were then offered as Peninsular, but production ceased at the end of 1912.

GM would use the brand name Marquette again for a junior Buick automobile in 1930, and would use the "Rainier" name on the rebranded Oldsmobile Bravada/Buick Rainier when Oldsmobile was discontinued in 2003.

John T. Rainier set up the Rainier Motor Truck Company in New York City soon after he returned from Saginaw in 1910. The Rainier Motor Corporation was organized in 1916 and moved back to Flushing in 1917. Rainier trucks were produced until 1927.

== Gallery ==
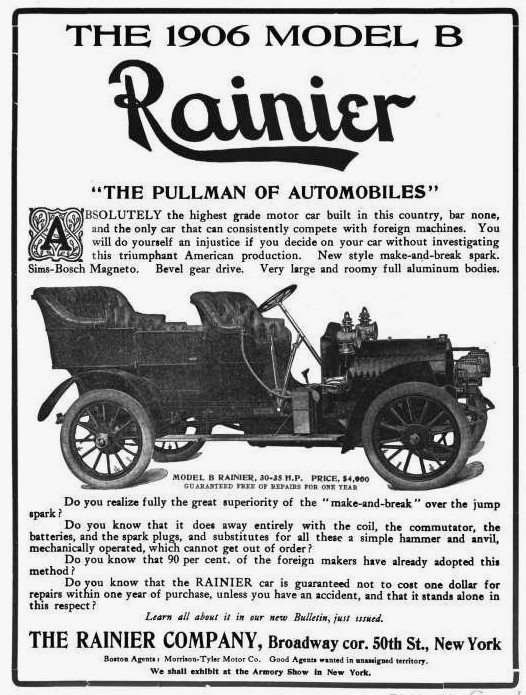
1906 Rainier Model B advertisement

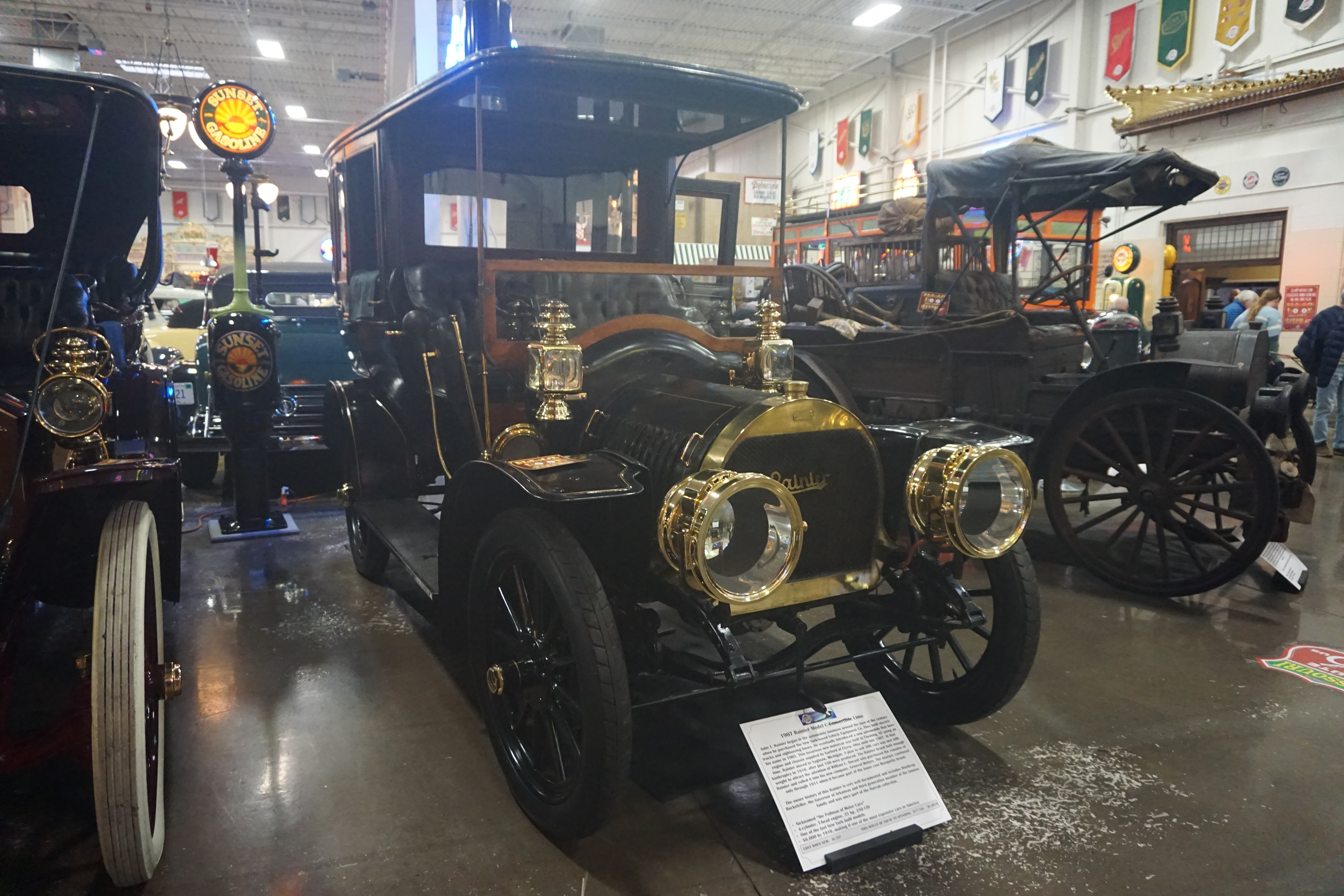
1907 Rainier Model C Limousine at Stahls Automotive Collection

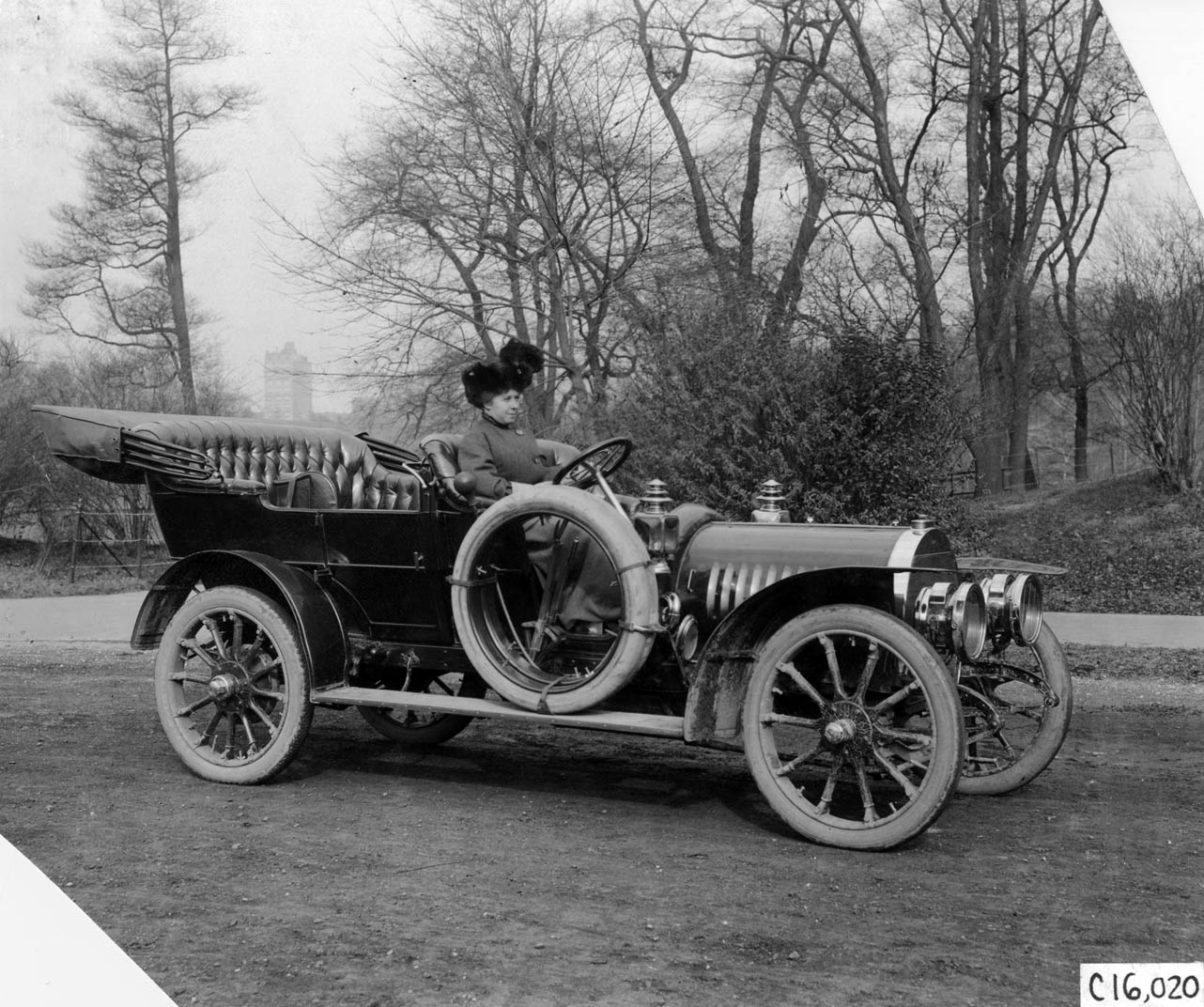
Racing driver, Joan Newton Cuneo with a 1908 Rainier Model D

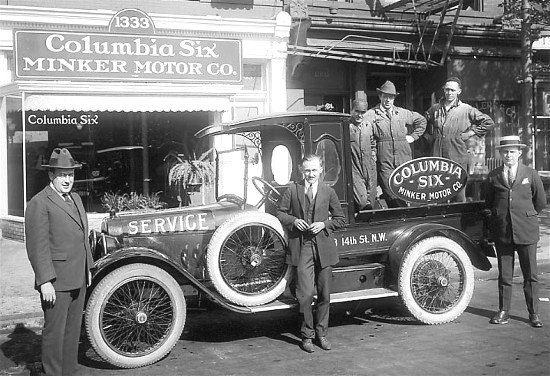
A 1910 Rainier with a service body for Minker Motor Co.

== Model overview ==
Series	Designation	Wheelbase	Coachwork	base price in US$
1905-06	Model A; 22/28 HP	98	Touring car, 5-pass.	3,500
1906	Model B; 30/35 HP	104	Town Car, 7-pass.	4,000
1907	Model C; 30/35 HP	104	Touring car, 5-pass.	4,250
1907	Model C; 30/35 HP	104	Landaulet, 7-pass.	4,250
1908-09	Model D; 40/50 HP	104	Touring car, 5-pass.	4,500
1908-09	Model D; 40/50 HP	104	Limousine, 7-pass.	5,500
1910	Model F; 50 HP	119	Enclosed Touring car, 7-pass.	4,500
1910	Model F; 50 HP	119	Touring car, 7-pass.	4,500
1910	Model F; 50 HP	119	Baby Tonneau, 5-pass.	4,500
1910	Model F; 50 HP	119	Close-coupled Touring Car, 5-pass.	4,500
1910	Model F; 50 HP	119	Limousine, 7-pass.	5,750
1910	Model F; 50 HP	119	Landaulet, 7-pass.	5,850
1911	Model F; 50 HP	120	Roadster, 2-pass.	4,250
1911	Model F; 50 HP	120	Close-Coupled Touring car, 4-pass	4,250
1911	Model F; 50 HP	120	Special Touring car, 7-pass.	4,250
1911	Model F; 50 HP	120	Regulation Touring car, 7-pass.	4,500
1911	Model F; 50 HP	120	Close-Coupled Touring car, 5-pass.	4,500
1911	Model F; 50 HP	120	Limousine, 7-pass.	4,600
1911	Model F; 50 HP	120	Landaulet, 7-pass.	4,600
