= Viking (automobile) =

Defunct American vehicle brand from General Motors

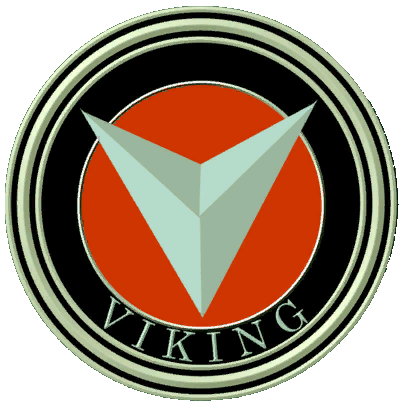
- Product type: Automobile
- Produced by: Oldsmobile (General Motors); Lansing Car Assembly; Lansing, Michigan
- Country: U.S.
- Introduced: 1929
- Discontinued: 1931; 95 years ago
- Markets: U.S.

Viking was a brand of automobiles manufactured by General Motors as a supplement to the Oldsmobile division for model years 1929 to 1931 and used the GM B platform. It was shared with the Oakland Model 301 for 1930 and 1931.

== Overview ==
Viking was part of Alfred Sloan's companion make program introduced to help span gaps in General Motors’ pricing structure, and was manufactured by GM's Oldsmobile division. Viking was one of four makes introduced by General Motors, the other lines (and their GM divisions) being Pontiac (Oakland), Marquette (Buick) and LaSalle (Cadillac). Of the four makes, Viking was the only one priced higher than its "parent" make, and took the role of senior luxury sedan for Oldsmobile until replaced by the Oldsmobile L-Series. It took over the senior luxury position from the Oldsmobile Light Eight.

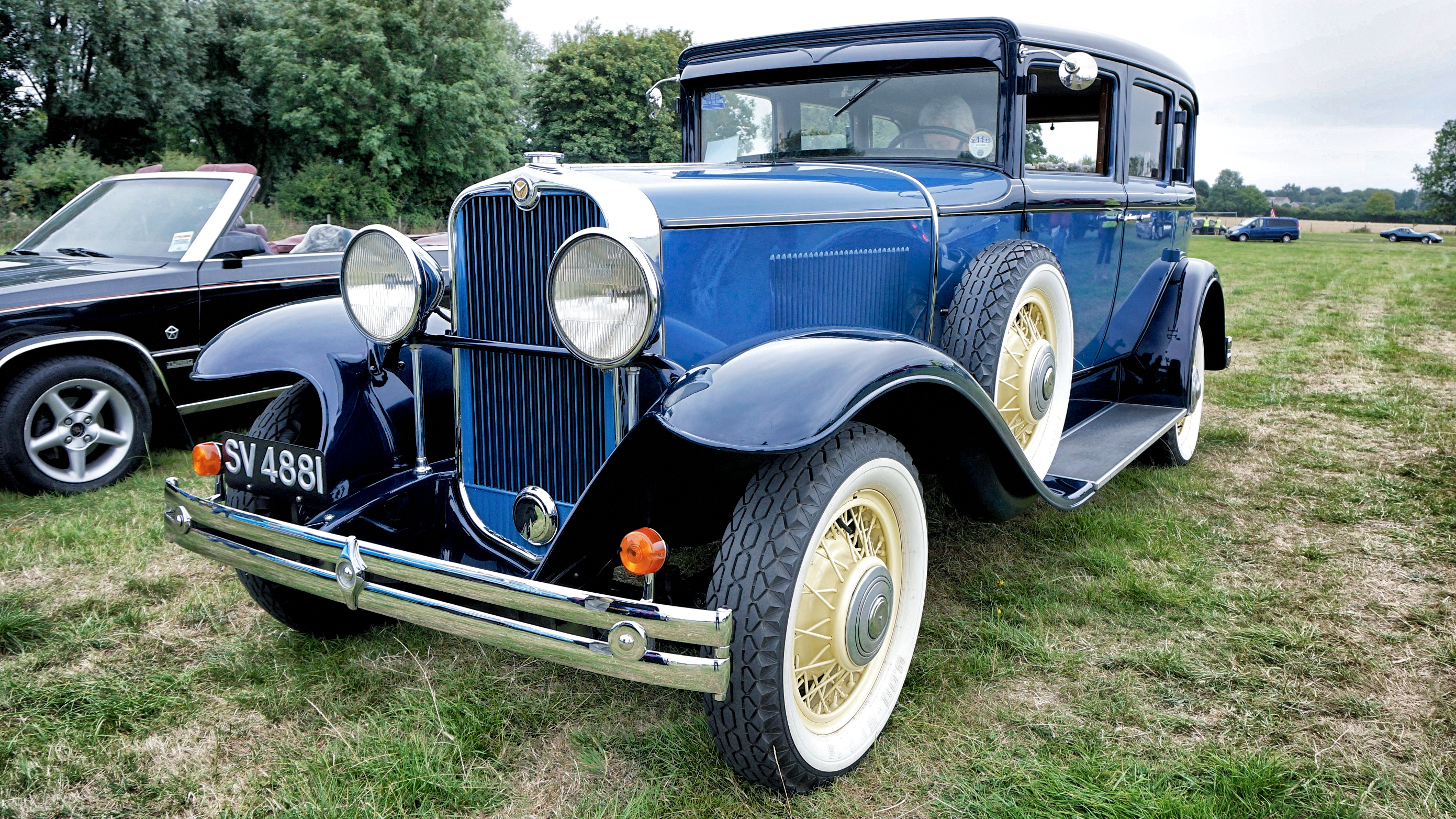
1930 Viking Sedan

Riding on a 125 in (3,175 mm) wheelbase with steel semi-elliptic springs and a 44.5 ft (14 m) turning circle, Vikings were powered by a 90° bank angle 260 cu in (4.3 L) flathead monobloc V8 engine that produced 81 hp (60 kW), the first automobile using this type of engine construction, and was shared with the Oakland V8. The monobloc architecture was later adapted for use in Cadillac and LaSalle. Vikings were available as a convertible coupé with rear deck seat, a 4-door sedan, and a close-coupled 4-door sedan in both standard and deluxe trim packages. The front seat and the steering wheel were adjustable.

Viking production for 1929 was 4,058 units and 1930 2,813, and retail prices were listed at US$1,595 ($29,906 in 2025 dollars) for any of the three body styles. GM discontinued the Viking and the Marquette at the end of the 1930 model year, preferring to bet on Oldsmobile and Buick, which had better consumer awareness. However, an additional 353 units were assembled using existing parts and marketed as 1931 models. Oldsmobile would not use a V8 engine until the Oldsmobile Rocket V8 in 1949.
