= Joan Newton Cuneo =

American racing driver (1876–1934)

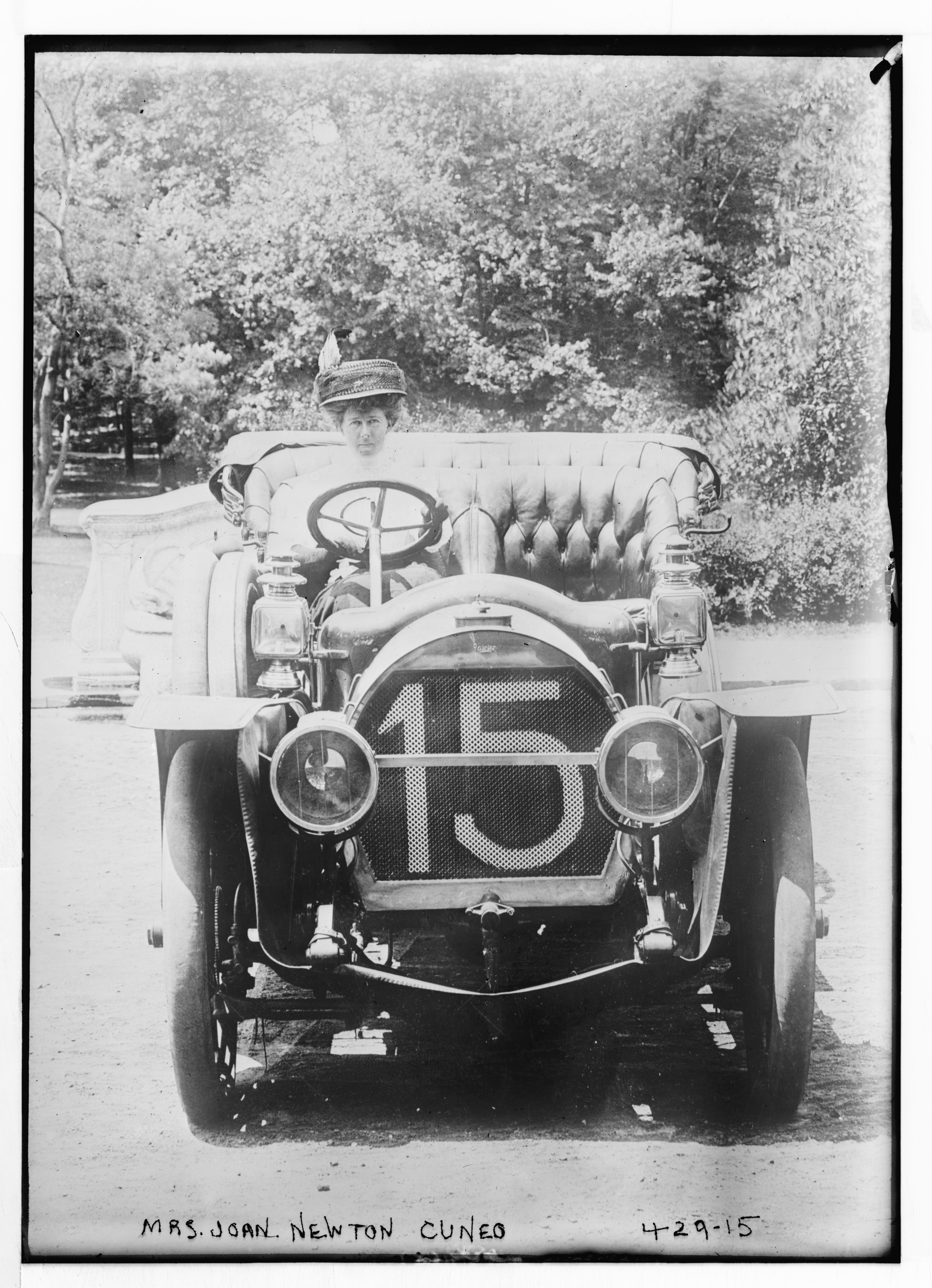
- Cuneo in 1915
- Born: Joan Carter Newton; July 22, 1876; Holyoke, Massachusetts, U.S.
- Died: March 24, 1934 (aged 57); Ontonagon, Michigan, U.S.
- Occupation: Racing driver
- Years active: 1905-1912
- Spouse(s): Andrew Cuneo (m. 1898-1915); James Francis Sickman (m. c. 1923-1934; her death)
- Children: 2

Joan Newton Cuneo (born Joan Carter Newton, July 22, 1876 – March 24, 1934) was an American racing driver. Between 1905 and 1912, she was successful in races against both male and female racers until the racing associations restricted races to men only. After women were banned from organized racing, she concentrated on setting women's speed records. Cuneo was a strong advocate for women drivers and an advocate for the Good Roads Movement in the United States. Until recently, she had received only a brief mention in automotive history "as the woman who got women banned from racing."

== Early life ==
Joan Carter Newton was born on July 22, 1876, in Holyoke, Massachusetts, the youngest of four daughters born to Leila Vulte and John Carter Newton. By the standards of the time, John Newton, a self-made millionaire, treated her more like a son than a daughter. He allowed Joan to drive a steam train and a six horse team. She became an expert horsewoman and bicyclist. As she grew older, her parents sent her to several boarding schools, reportedly to become a Victorian lady.

In 1898, Newton married Andrew Cuneo, the adopted son of millionaire banker and slum lord Antonio Cuneo. The couple had two children, Antonio (A. Newton Cuneo (b. 1899) and Maddalena (Dolly) Cuneo (b. 1901), in the first three years of their marriage. In 1902, their relationship began to change when Andrew Cuneo bought his wife a 1902 Locomobile. She soon became interested in racing.

== Career as a "driver of large racing cars" ==
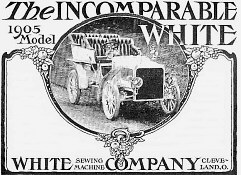
1905 advertisement for White Company automobile

In 1905, Cuneo purchased a 1905 White Motor Company steam car. She learned about the mechanical side of automobiles from the mechanic/chauffeur Louis Disbrow, whom her husband hired for her. Disbrow was a neighbor who had recently escaped conviction for murder. He was from a wealthy family and had experience with autos, as his brothers owned a nearby automobile agency. For the next four years, Disbrow would be Cuneo's riding mechanic, going with her to many races, as well as on three Glidden Tours. Andrew Cuneo also went along to many of these events, but would often leave after a few days to attend to his business affairs.

By 1905, the New York papers were full of automobile related events. One of the most talked about was the Glidden Tour, a brain child of Colonel Jasper Glidden, intended to popularize the auto while proving its reliability on a strenuous tour of several states on the difficult, unpaved roads of the time. Cuneo, only 5'2" and already an experienced driver, was eager to participate and sent in her application. It was promptly rejected by the American Automobile Association, the sanctioning body for the tour, because only male drivers were allowed. Cuneo, already a member of the AAA, sent her application back, saying that nowhere in the rules did it state that women were excluded. The AAA reluctantly allowed her to enter.

== Accident ==
Cuneo entered the 1905 Glidden, with three passengers, her husband Andrew, mechanic Louis Disbrow, and his sister, and set off in her 1905 White car. At least four other White cars were entered in the tour, including one driven by Walther White, the president of the company.

Cuneo was enjoying the first day's drive when she saw the car in front of her inexplicably stop and start to back up at the entrance to a narrow bridge. There were no brake lights in 1905. Cuneo tried to evade the car but there was little room to maneuver. The wheels of the White car ran off the bridge, and the car and its passengers fell off the bridge and landed in the stream bed below. The White was a sturdy machine and started up after it was righted by nearby spectators and workmen. Its passengers suffered only bruises and were unfazed by their experience. Cuneo was able to drive her car up out of the ditch and the foursome continued on their way. However, the battered White eventually gave out on the final day of the tour despite repairs by a local blacksmith. Cuneo's accident, however, made headlines throughout the Northeast and would actually launch her career as a racer.

== Her first races ==
Shortly after the Cuneos got back to their Long Island home, several newspapers contacted Joan Cuneo and encouraged her to enter a competition being held on the beach at Atlantic City, New Jersey. She shipped her car to the beach and came in second in a one-mile race on Labor Day weekend in September 1905. Cuneo then entered the race at the Duchess County Fair held at Poughkeepsie NY later that month. This was her first attempt at track racing. She said later, "I had my first experience at track racing...it was a case of love at first sight and my love for track racing grew each time I drove around one." She met Barney Oldfield for the first time at this race. Her experience at Poughkeepsie was frustrating, and she expressed disappointment with her slow time of 1:22:5 for an exhibition mile to set a new women's record. She was unable to finish the 5-mile handicap race she had entered (competing against male drivers), as she had car trouble. Ironically, after fixing the car, she was arrested for speeding on the way home.

== Setting speed records ==
In 1905, many male drivers, including Barney Oldfield and Ralph De Palma, drew crowds at local tracks when they attempted to set a new speed record for one, five, or even ten miles. Cuneo was often limited to exhibition runs because of her sex, but she gained fame by setting a number of speed records. Unlike Dorothy Levitt, her British contemporary who drove factory prepared cars, Cuneo always drove her own personal cars, although they were stripped down to the bare essentials for racing. After women were banned from racing, several of her male competitors trusted her to drive their race cars in order to set yet another women's speed record. In 1906, Cuneo honed her racing skills at a variety of tracks, usually one-half to one mile flat dirt ovals more often used for horse racing. There were no purpose-built automobile race tracks until the Indianapolis Motor Speedway was completed in 1909.

She also competed in popular amateur automobile events called gymkhanas. These were obstacle course events for cars instead of horses. Drivers had to drive around and over obstacles and inclines, sometimes in reverse. At the Danbury Fair in 1906, Cuneo was driving full speed in a gymkhana with two women passengers when the car caught fire. The passengers bailed out the back of the car but she calmly shut off the engine and turned off the gas before jumping out. Although she suffered painful burns and singed hair, she shrugged off the event as nothing unusual.

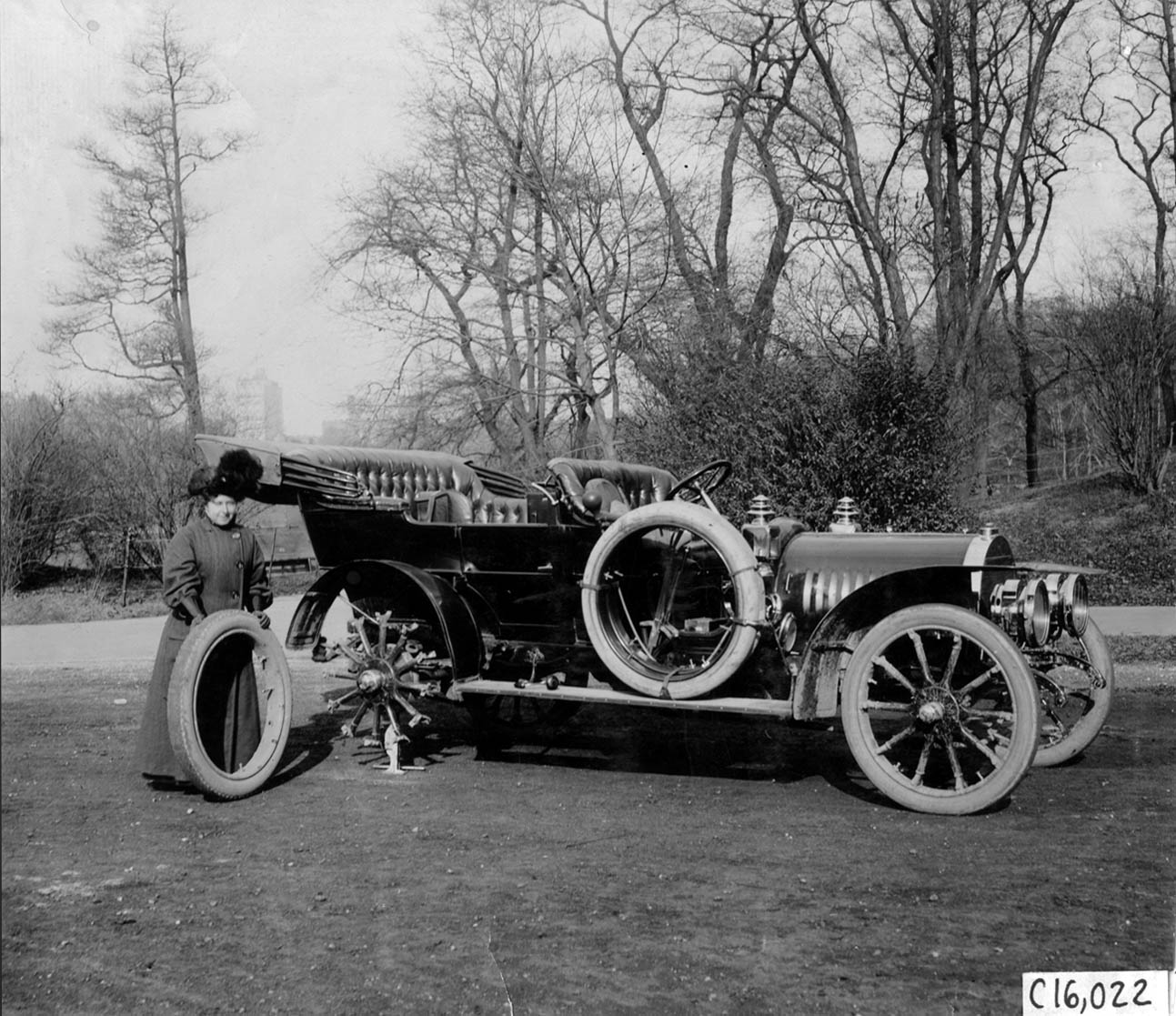
Cuneo changing a tire on her 1908 Rainier car

Cuneo had become an experienced driver who could muscle a car without power steering and minimal suspension and brakes on the poor roads of the time as well as rough dirt tracks. In 1907, she finished third in a hundred-mile race, with a time of two hours and 23 minutes, driving a Rainier. Many who interviewed her were surprised to meet a small woman with a steady gaze and low voice instead of a powerful Amazon.

As Cuneo gained skill as a driver, she also became more involved in the care and maintenance of her cars. Cuneo believed that in the years since she had learned to drive, autos had improved mechanically, and the main problem now was blow-outs. The tires of that era had little resemblance to those of today; all had a tube as well as an outer casing and were time-consuming to change. It would take many years before tires caught up to mechanical improvements. Her 1908 Rainier car was equipped with Fisk bolted-on tires with removable rim, a new invention at the time. Instead of removing the whole tire frame, Cuneo could replace the rim in just a few minutes. She also wished for a self-starter. As she said, "It took both knack and strength and one can tell only by one's automobile sense whether more knack or more strength is needed at the precise moment."

== Mardi Gras Races ==
In the summer of 1908, Cuneo reached the high point both of her racing career and celebrity. Driving a Rainier car, she completed the 1908 Glidden Tour with a perfect score, for which she was presented with a Gorham sterling silver plaque by the Rainier motor company, engraved with scenes of her vehicle during the race and inscribed "as a token of appreciation for her skill, energy and pluck in successfully piloting Ranier Car No.15 and finishing with a perfect score".

She set more speed records and had her entry accepted for a number of races to be held at the New Orleans Fair Grounds track in February 1909. The promoters of these races hoped to add one or two women's events to create additional publicity. Cuneo entered nearly all the races, including those supposed to be for males only. When the time came, they did not forbid her to race, perhaps because no other women showed up to compete against her. As a result, during the course of the three-day event, she defeated some of the leading male racers including Bob Burman and George Robertson, and finished second to Ralph De Palma in a fifty-mile race. De Palma was considered the best racer of the day. The resulting flurry of news articles trumpeting her success came just as the Contest Board of the American Automobile Association had decided to ban women from any competition they sanctioned, including the Glidden Tours. Cuneo was furious, but there was little she could do. The men of the Contest Board, most of whom she knew well, turned her away whenever she tried to enter an AAA event. Although never a vocal proponent of women's rights, Cuneo felt strongly that women should be allowed to compete if they had the ability and desire, and she had already demonstrated that she had plenty of both. Although she thought of taking the Contest Board to court, she realized it would be futile as its male officials had closed ranks against her.

== Life after banishment ==
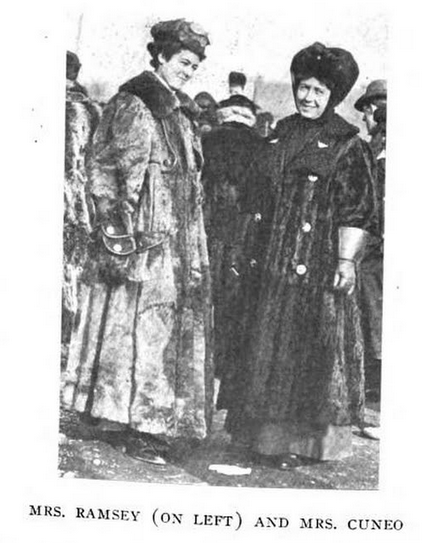
Alice H. Ramsey and Joan N. Cuneo, from a 1909 publication

After the new rules went into effect, Cuneo still competed in events that were not sanctioned by the AAA, and set several unofficial women's speed records. She wrote articles on motoring for magazines and was a spokesperson for the Good Roads movement as well as orphans' charities in New York. However, she would never again have the opportunity to do what she wanted most: compete against the best male drivers of the time. She still loved fast driving and collected the speeding tickets to prove it.

Her glamorous life in New York slowly ground to a halt as Andrew Cuneo's bank and businesses came close to failure. In 1915 her marriage ended in divorce due to Andrew's scandalous involvement with a showgirl, actress and artist's model, Yvette de Von.

By 1916, Cuneo no longer made the national news. In 1917, she and her daughter Dolly moved to Deerfield Valley, Vermont. In 1923, she followed her childhood sweetheart James Francis Sickman to Ontonagon, a small town in the upper peninsula of Michigan where she lived until her death in 1934. She eventually married Sickman and was heavily involved in improving the lives of Ontonagon's residents. Cuneo's obituary in the Ontonagon newspaper did not mention her racing career, and her death on March 24, 1934, merited only a brief paragraph in the New York Times.

== Legacy ==
In 2016, a collection of some of Cuneo's trophies still owned by her descendants was sold at auction. The collection included the 1908 Gorham sterling silver plaque and trophies won at the 1909 Mardi Gras Speed Carnival, and the Hugh Chalmers Trophy won during the Women's Motoring Club New York-Philadelphia Run in January 1909.
