= Oldsmobile L-Series =

Pre-WWII American passenger car

Oldsmobile Eight F-Series
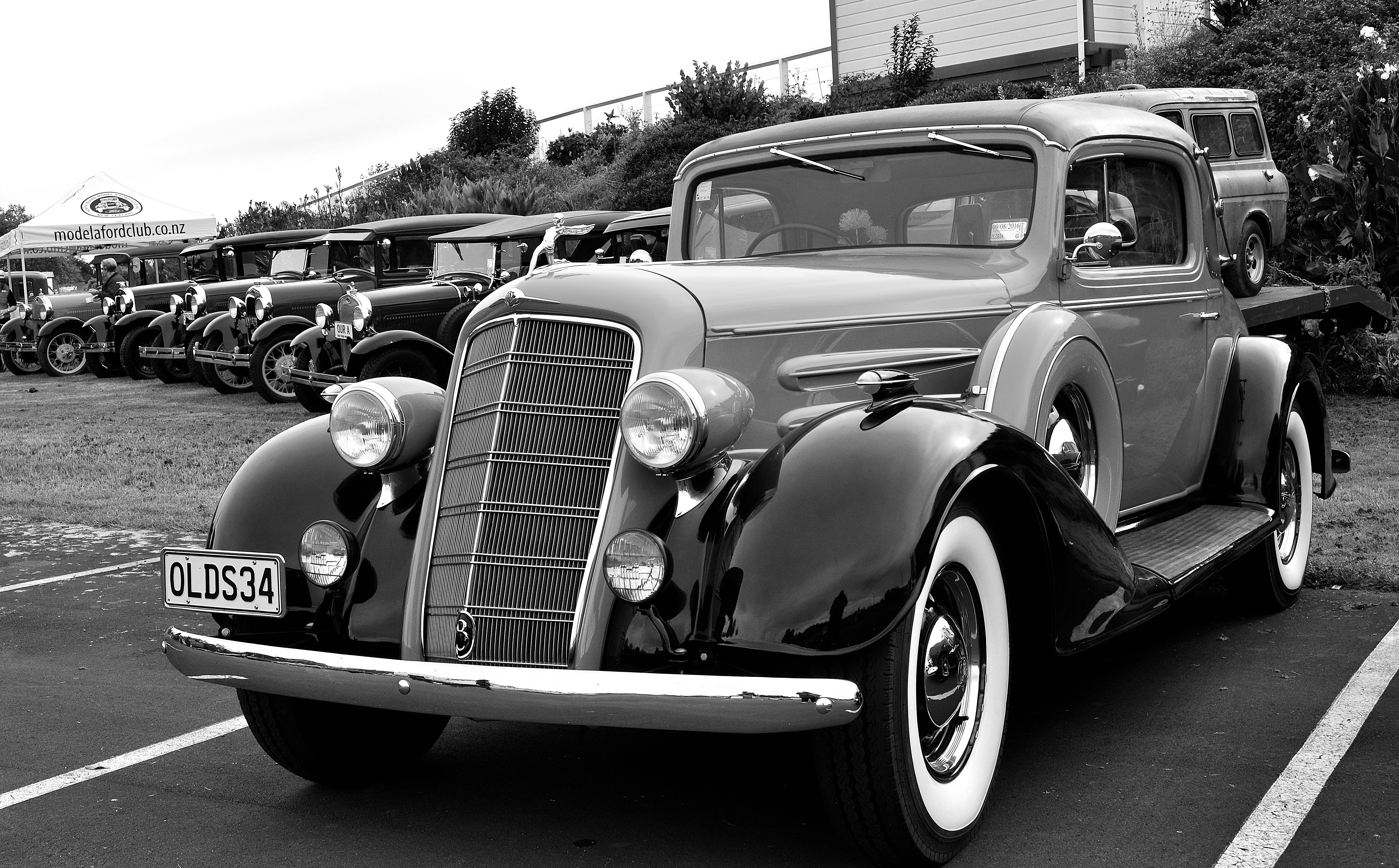
- 1934 Oldsmobile Eight L- Series Sport Coupe

Overview
- Manufacturer: Oldsmobile (General Motors)
- Production: 1932–1938
- Assembly: Fisher Body, Detroit, Michigan (main plant); United States: Lansing, Michigan (Lansing Car Assembly) (branch assembly); Linden Assembly, Linden, New Jersey (starting 1937); South Gate Assembly, South Gate, California (starting 1937)

Body and chassis
- Body style: Roadster; Two-door coupe; Four-door sedan
- Layout: Front engine, rear drive
- Platform: B-body

Powertrain
- Engine: 240.4 cubic inches (3.9 L) Oldsmobile straight-8 engine
- Transmission: Automatic Safety Transmission (1937-1939); 3-speed manual transmission

Chronology
- Successor: Olds Series 80; Olds Series 90

The Oldsmobile L-Series, or the Oldsmobile 8, was built from the 1932 through 1938. Oldsmobile had not offered a full-sized luxury flagship since the cancellation of the Oldsmobile Light Eight in 1923, and the Viking upscale companion brand to Oldsmobile did not sell very well, being cancelled after two years. The 1933 model introduced a completely new body style influenced by the "streamlined" appearance, and it was shared with all GM brands due to GM's Art and Color Studio headed by Harley Earl. The appearance showed influences of Chrysler and Lincoln-Zephyr vehicles, and all Oldsmobiles were manufactured in Lansing, Michigan. Due to the popularity of the Oldsmobile F-Series, Oldsmobile recognized an opportunity to sell a similar sized alternative to the Buick Super, the Cadillac Series 355, and the "junior" companion brand LaSalle a platform the L-Series shared on the GM C platform. It was replaced by the Oldsmobile Series 90 introduced in 1938, and it was exported to Japan as a knock down kit and assembled at Osaka Assembly in Osaka, Japan.

== L-32 through L-38 ==
The L-Series was equipped with a side-valve, 240 cu in (3,933 cc) straight eight-cylinder engine developing 87 bhp. This generation had a wheelbase of 116–124 in (2,959–3,150 mm) and was offered as a closed body sedan, coupe and convertible. All four wheels now offered as standard equipment hydraulic drum brakes, and in 1933 wooden spoked wheels were permanently discontinued with pressed steel discs instead. With the modern appearance of streamlined gaining widely accepted public approval, all bodystyles across GM's vehicles adopted the appearance, with an overall length of 179–200 in (4,540–5,069 mm). The retail price listed for a 1938 L-38 4-door Trunked Sedan was US$1,107 ($25,320 in 2025 dollars). 1933 was the first year all GM vehicles were installed with optional vent windows which were initially called “No Draft Individually Controlled Ventilation” later renamed "Ventiplanes" which the patent application was filed on Nov. 28, 1932. It was assigned to the Ternstedt Manufacturing Company, a GM subsidiary that manufactured components for Fisher Body

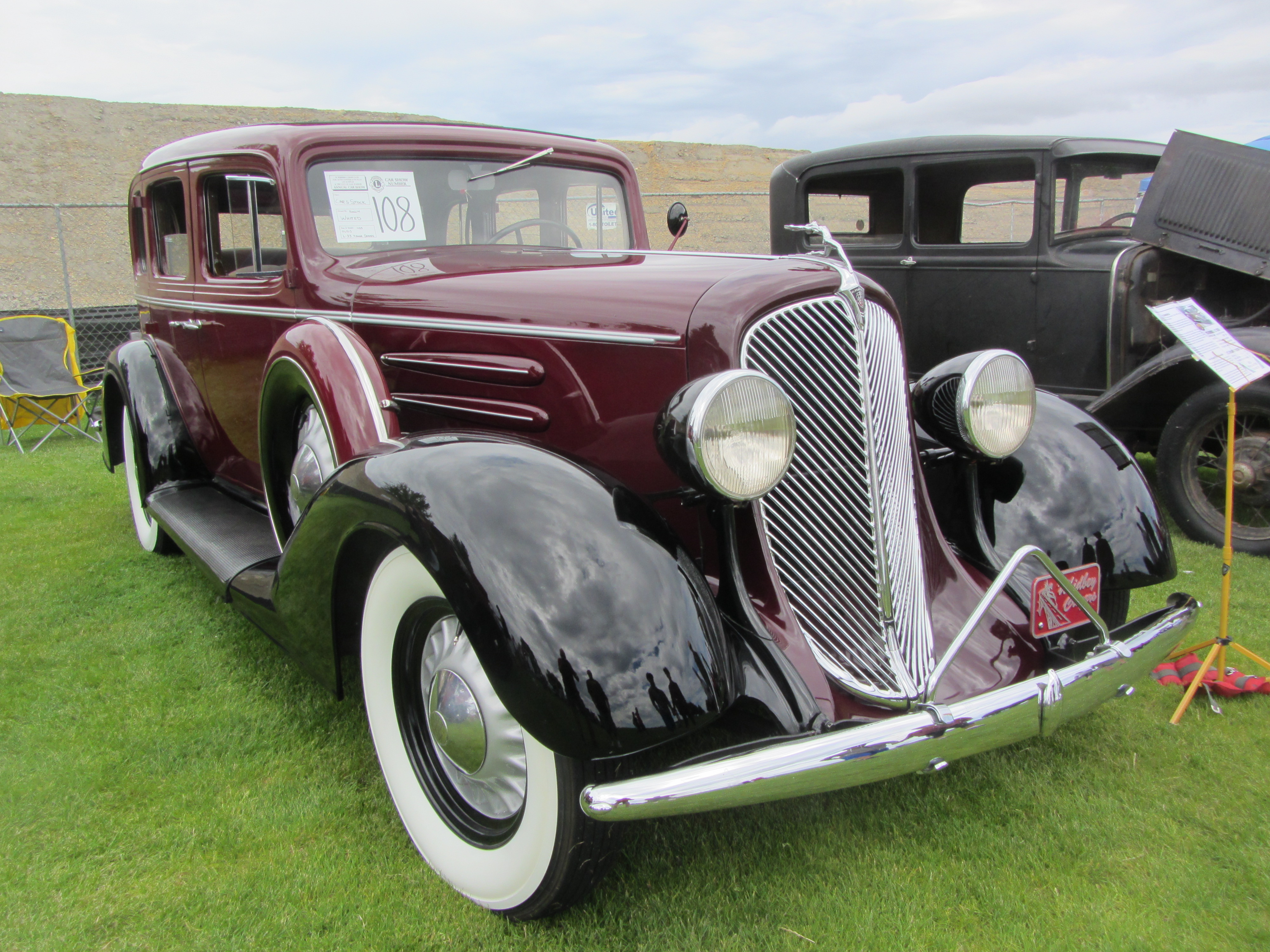
1933 Oldsmobile Eight L-Series Model L-33 Touring Sedan

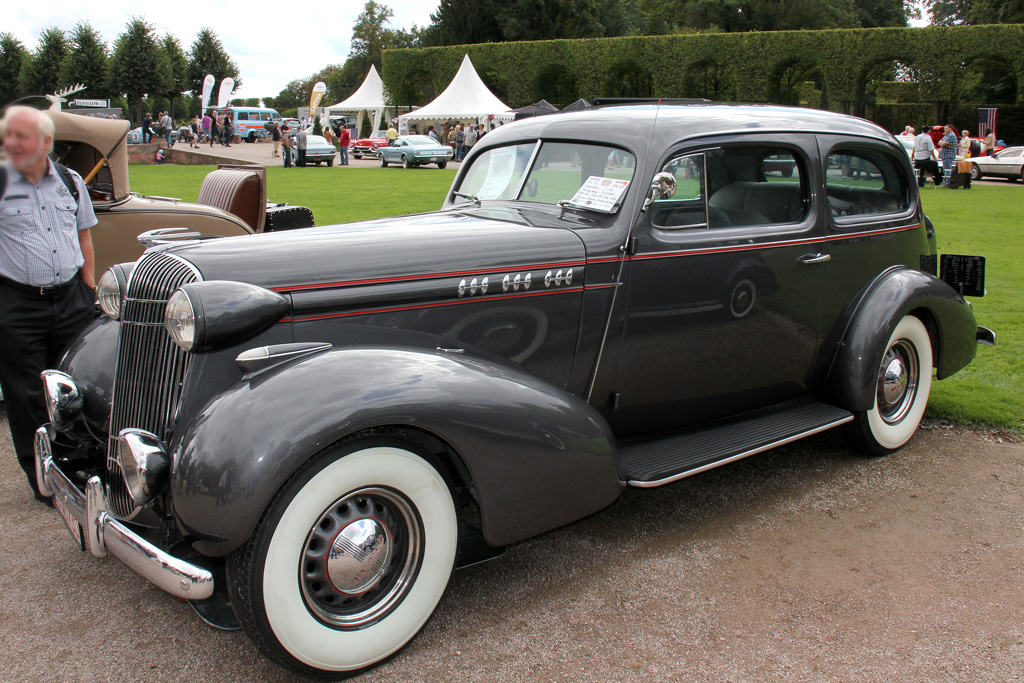
1936 Oldsmobile Eight L-Series Model L-36 2-door Trunked Sedan

=== See also ===
- 1935 Buick Roadmaster
- 1935 Cadillac Series 355
- 1936 Cadillac Series 60
