= General Motors companion make program =

Automotive marques

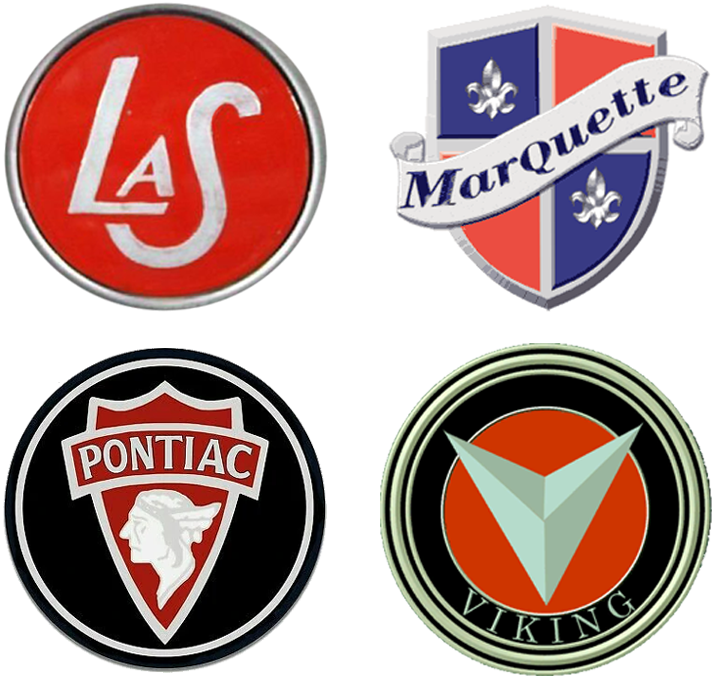
- The four brands that were part of the companion make program
- Date: 1926–2010
- Location: U.S.
- Type: Automobile branding
- Motive: Launching new brands to supplement GM's current marques
- Organised by: General Motors
- Participants: LaSalle; Marquette; Pontiac; Viking

In the late 1920s, American automotive company General Motors (GM) launched four companion makes to supplement its existing lineup of five-passenger car (Note: GMC, also owned by GM, makes light trucks and not cars.) brands, or makes. (Note: The words brand, make, and marque are synonymous in the automotive industry. They are distinguished from a company, which can produce several makes, as well as a model, which is a specific style of automobile produced by a make over a set period of time.) The companion makes were LaSalle, introduced for the 1927 model year to supplement Cadillac; Marquette, introduced in 1929 for 1930 (Note: It is common practice in the American automotive industry to introduce a model year's automobile during the previous calendar year.) to supplement Buick; Pontiac, introduced for 1926 to supplement Oakland; and Viking, introduced for 1929 to supplement Oldsmobile. GM's fifth existing brand, Chevrolet, did not receive a companion make. With the exception of Viking, each of the companion makes were slotted below their "parent make" in GM's pricing hierarchy.

GM had pioneered the idea of having a ladder of brands, arranged in order by price, to appeal to consumers with different incomes. This contributed to GM's rise to automotive dominance in the 1920s at the expense of Ford. By the late 1920s, GM felt that there were excessive gaps in this ladder. President Alfred P. Sloan devised the companion makes in order to fill those gaps. The companion makes were also intended to increase the sales of their respective divisions by selling cars that cost less to produce.

The program is generally considered a failure. Sales of Vikings and Marquettes were low during the Great Depression and the brands were discontinued by 1931. LaSalle lasted longer, weathering the Depression until it too ceased production after 1940. Pontiac had a different fate; its popularity led to the discontinuation of Oakland after 1931. Pontiac was the only GM marque produced for a significant amount of time that was not an outside acquisition; it was discontinued in 2010 in the aftermath of the Great Recession.

== Background and concept ==
General Motors (GM) was founded in 1908 by William C. Durant as a holding company for Buick, which had been founded by David Dunbar Buick in 1903 and controlled by Durant since 1904. Durant intended for GM to replicate his business model as a horse-drawn coachbuilder, where he had found success by quickly acquiring outside companies in order to produce various coaches at different price points.

The three companies Durant initially purchased for General Motors were Oldsmobile, Oakland, and Cadillac, all of which he had bought more or less arbitrarily. (Note: Oldsmobile, which had been founded in 1896, was bought by GM in 1908. Oakland, which had entered the automotive business in 1907, joined GM within a year of GM's founding. Cadillac, which had been formed from the remains of the Henry Ford Company in 1902, was purchased by GM in June 1909.) That, combined with his having over-leveraged the fledgling company in making these acquisitions, saw Durant expelled from GM in 1910 at the behest of its creditors, who were reeling from the Panic of 1910–1911. Durant created Chevrolet shortly thereafter; he ultimately used the new company to regain control of GM in 1918.

Finding himself president of GM once more, Durant fell back into old patterns; by 1920 he had grown the number of GM divisions from five to seven. GM stock, meanwhile, had fallen precipitously during Durant's second stint as president, and by 1920 the GM board decided they had had enough. In November of that year Durant was forced out of GM for the last time, at which point the company was almost bankrupt. He was replaced as GM president by Pierre du Pont of DuPont.

One of du Pont's main assistants was GM vice president Alfred P. Sloan. Sloan recognized that GM was ineffectively utilizing its various brands to fight against Ford, which at the time commanded more than half of the automobile market. Of all the GM vehicles available at the time, none were a competitive alternative to the immensely popular Ford Model T; the GM marques themselves also lacked a coherent framework that would make it easy for buyers of entry-level models to upgrade to a more premium car within the GM fold. Instead of complementing each other, different GM brands found themselves competing for the same customers, ultimately cannibalizing sales for GM as a whole.

While du Pont believed that direct competition with the Model T would be GM's best opportunity to gain market share, Sloan instead decided to pursue Durant's idea, albeit without crediting Durant, of a "car for every purse and purpose". Sloan discontinued Scripps-Booth and sold the Sheridan brand, then reorganized the remaining five marques into a price hierarchy that positioned Chevrolet as the most entry-level line, Oldsmobile, Oakland, and Buick, as the mid-tier brands, and Cadillac as the flagship marque. However, the order of the marques' pricing was fluid, and by 1929 Oldsmobiles were cheaper than Buicks and Oaklands.

The idea of pricing cars on a ladder – in concert with other innovations by GM at the time, including providing credit to prospective car buyers – was tremendously successful in expanding GM's market share during the 1920s. The company surpassed Ford in market share in 1927, the same year that the Model T was discontinued in favor of the updated Model A.

== Launch ==
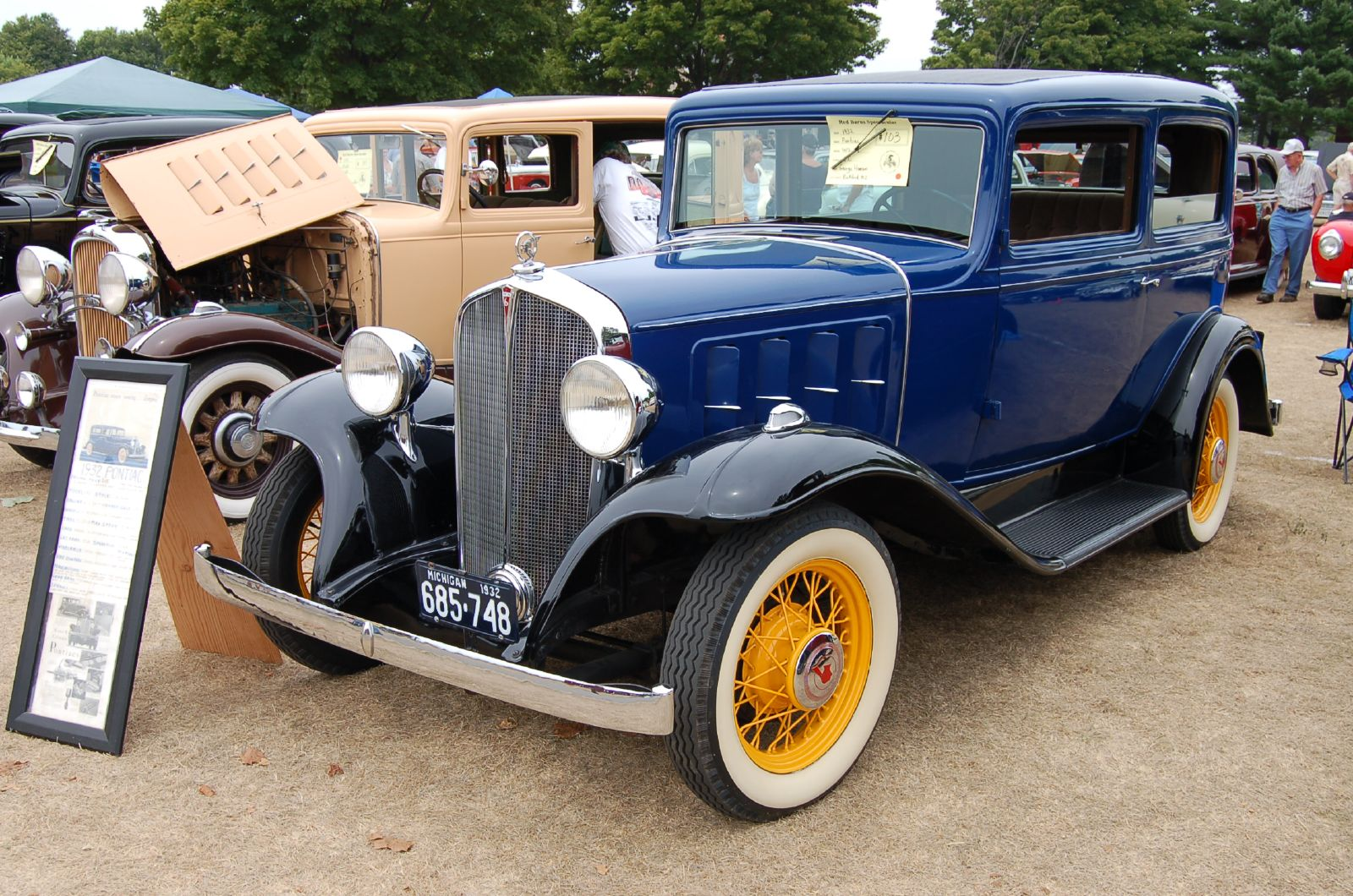
A 1932 Pontiac. Established in 1926 as a companion of Oakland, it was the first marque released as part of the companion make program

Sloan, who had replaced du Pont as GM president in 1923, decided to create various "companion makes" to fill the variety of gaps that had developed in the original pricing hierarchy. These companion makes, introduced within GM's existing divisions as opposed to being treated as independent marques, were intended to increase sales of the parent division while costing less to produce.

Oakland introduced Pontiac at the 1926 New York Auto Show as a low-priced model for the 1926 model year, followed by a sales meeting at the Commodore Hotel. The name dated to 1893 as a coachbuilding business that had been the predecessor of Oakland's automotive ventures, and was an homage to both its factory in Pontiac, Michigan, and the Native American chief of the same name. Touted as "the Chief of the Sixes" for its six-cylinder inline engine, it was designed from scratch by Ben H. Anibal, who had previously been Cadillac's chief engineer, to the order of Oakland's general manager Al R. Glancy. By the 1929 model year, its flathead engine was able to make 60 brake horsepower (bhp) (45 kW). The chassis had a wheelbase of 110 inches (2,800 mm), and the car was available in such body styles as a roadster, phaeton, coupe, convertible, two- or four-door sedan, or landaulet.

In early 1926, Lawrence P. Fisher, the general manager of the Cadillac division, visited a Los Angeles Cadillac dealership run by Don Lee that also made custom cars for Hollywood actors and producers. The director of the custom car operation, Harley Earl, would turn boxy factory automobiles into sleek low-riding roadsters, something that thrilled Fisher. Fisher hired Earl in spring 1926 to design a sleek low-priced vehicle to be introduced by Cadillac in 1927 known as the LaSalle. Sloan was sufficiently impressed by the result that he made Earl head of a special design division of GM, established in June 1927. The LaSalle itself was introduced in March 1927 for the 1927 model year. By the 1929 model year it had a V8 engine with a newly-introduced synchromesh transmission. It came with a wheelbase of either 128 in (3,300 mm) or 134 in (3,400 mm); the former was available as a roadster and various forms of phaeton, while the latter was available in various forms of convertible, various forms of coupe, or various forms of sedan.

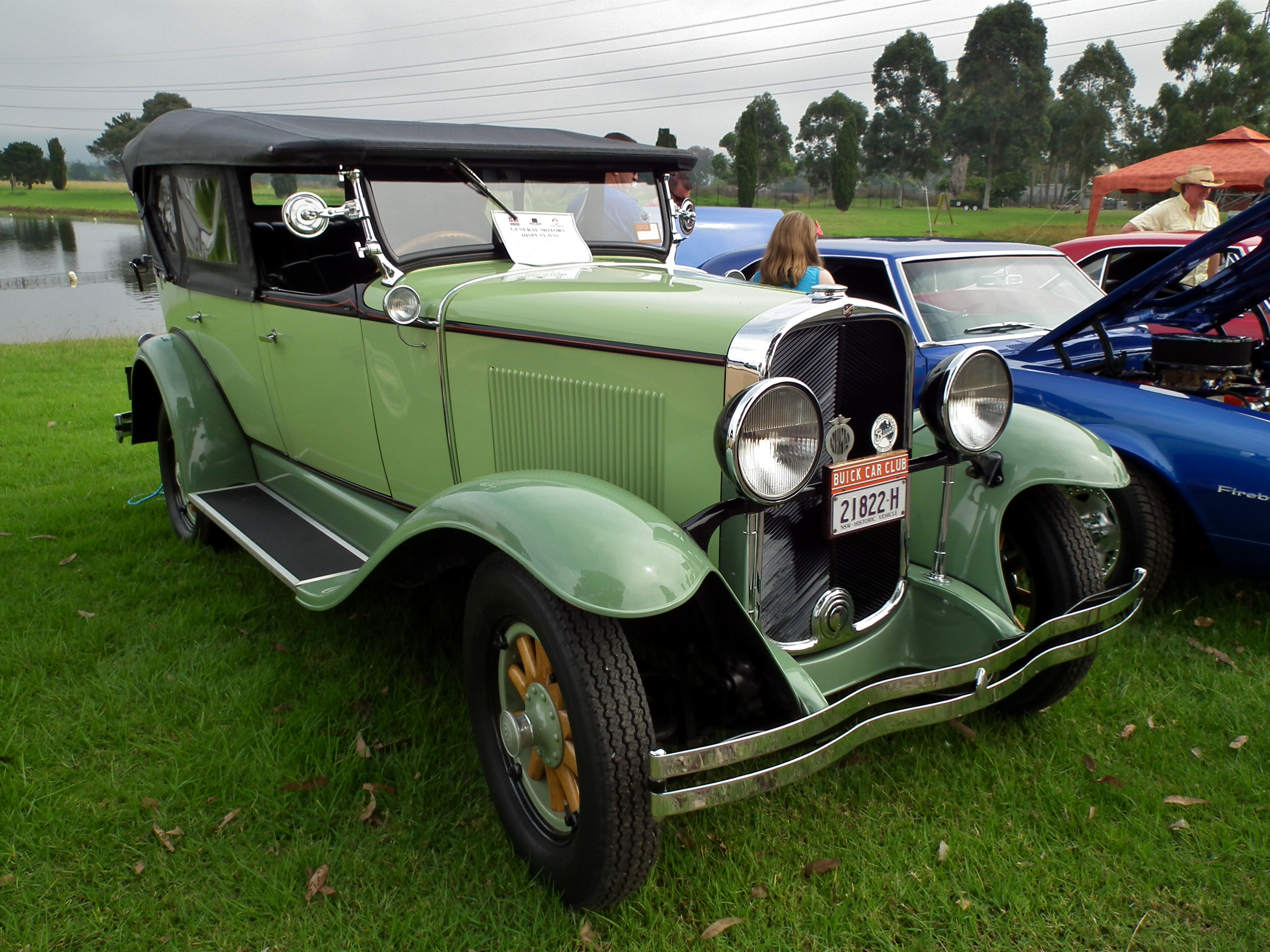
1930 Marquette, a brand as an alternative to Buick

Oldsmobile introduced the Viking in March 1929 for the 1929 model year. The Viking served as the upscale counterpart of Oldsmobile's F-29 model, which had a 62 bhp (46 kW) six-cylinder inline engine. The Viking, by contrast, had a monoblock 81 hp (60 kW) V8 engine. Its logo, a stylized "V", stood for both "Viking" and "V8". It resembled the LaSalle in appearance, had a 125 in (3,200 mm) wheelbase, and was available as a convertible, a close-coupled sedan, or standard sedan. It was initially priced at $1,595, (Note: $23,700 in 2019) but by the end of 1929 had become worth $1,695. (Note: $25,200 in 2019) During his 1930 visit to the United States to attempt a land speed record in the Silver Bullet, British racer Kaye Don used a Viking for casual driving and to test the terrain of his record attempt. A retrospective noted it as a "fine car" that "doubtless...would have survived" but for the Great Depression.

After Buick sales had declined in the previous several years and following the successes of Pontiac and LaSalle, Buick introduced Marquette to showrooms on June 1, 1929, for the 1930 model year. Unlike Buick, which was noted for its overhead valve engine, the Marquette had a flathead six-cylinder engine based on Oldsmobile's. A prominent selling point was its fine engineering and craftsmanship; its engineers remarked that one could drive it at 60 mph (97 km/h) without damaging the engine, and one was driven from Death Valley to Pikes Peak without any issues. Other standard features included an air cleaner and a large muffler. Having a 114 in (2,900 mm) wheelbase with its engine making 67 hp (50 kW), it was offered as a roadster, phaeton, one of two styles of coupe, or one of two styles of sedan. It possessed distinctive styling, with a portly shape that led to its sobriquet of "the pregnant Buick" and a herringbone radiator, to distinguish it from other GM makes.

General Motors marques as of 1929, in descending order of price and with parent marques duly noted (Note: All figures are for the 1929 model year except for the Marquette, which is for the 1930 model year. Prices do not include optional features of each automobile.)
Make	Price range in 1929	Price range in 2022 dollars
Cadillac	$3,295 – $6,700	$49,100 – $99,800
LaSalle (Cadillac)	$2,295 – $5,125	$34,200 – $76,300
Buick	$1,195 – $2,145	$17,800 – $31,900
Viking (Oldsmobile)	$1,595	$23,700
Oakland	$1,145 – $1,375	$17,000 – $20,500
Marquette (Buick)	$900 – $1,000	$13,400 – $14,900
Oldsmobile	$875 – $1,035	$13,000 – $15,400
Pontiac (Oakland)	$745 – $895	$11,100 – $13,300
Chevrolet	$525 – $725	$7,800 – $10,800

== Demise and legacy ==
The beginning of the Great Depression made the Viking unprofitable for Oldsmobile, which had enough trouble selling its own models that were just under half the price, and it was discontinued at the end of 1930. Existing parts were assembled into the final Vikings for the 1931 model year. The Depression was similarly unkind to Marquette, which, having failed to resuscitate Buick's sales, was discontinued at the end of the 1930 model year, after about 35,000 units were made and mere months after dealerships had been mailed signs to put up advertising their presence. Two factors working against the Marquette were its flathead engine, which irked fans of Buick's overhead valve philosophy, and its six-cylinder engine, which was incompatible with Buick's decision to offer only eight-cylinder cars for 1931. After its discontinuation, the Marquette's body design was used in Buicks. The production tools for the engine were exported to Germany and used by Opel, GM's European subsidiary, for their Blitz truck.

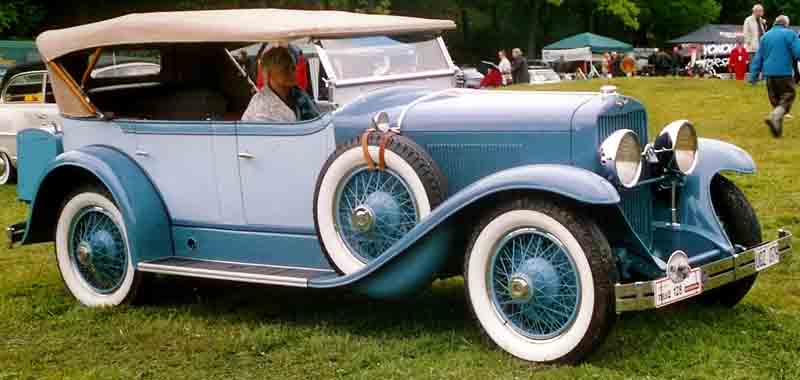
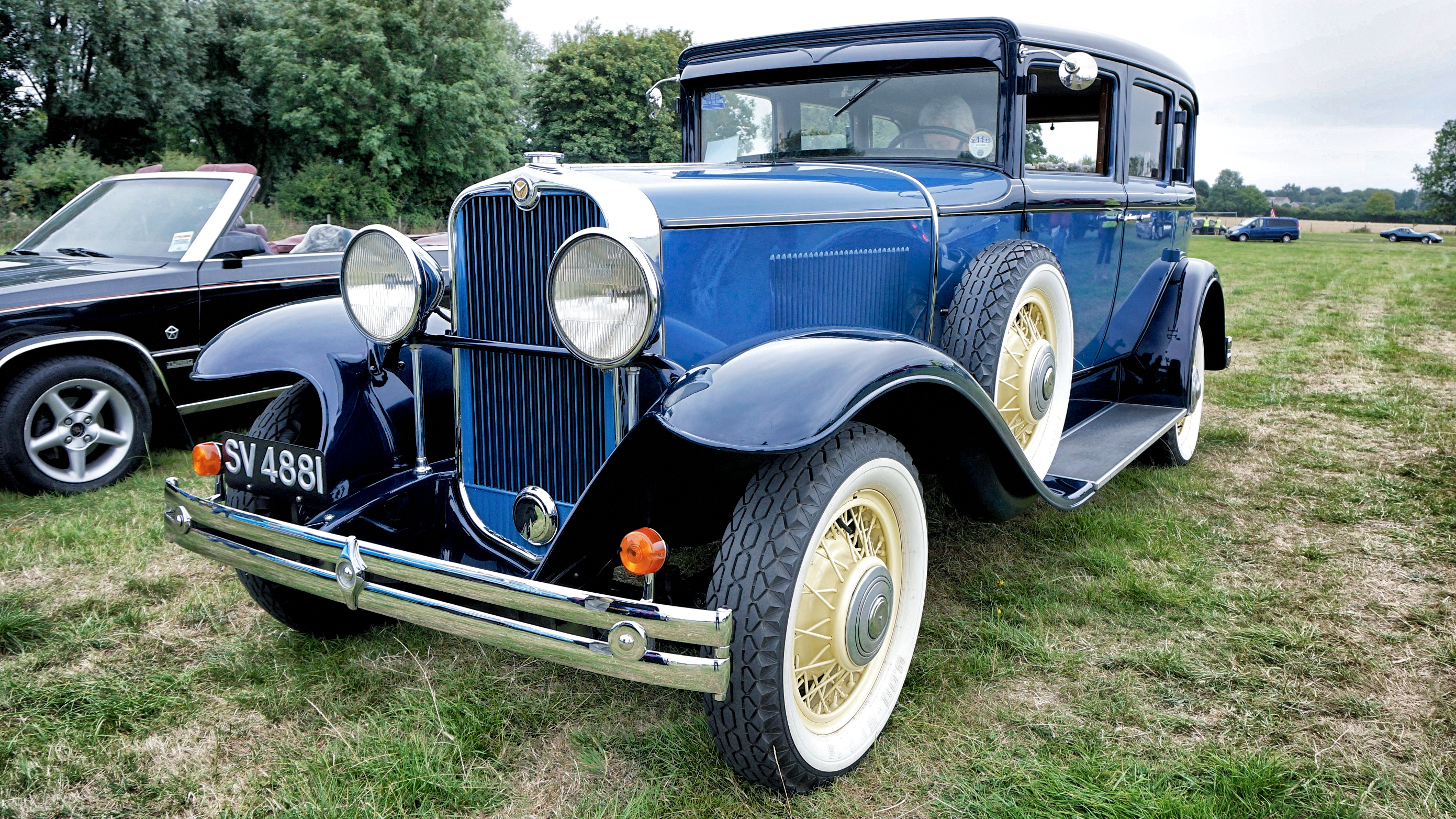
LaSalle (left) survived until 1940, while Viking (right) only lasted until 1931

LaSalle fared better; initially selling a quarter of the Cadillac division's output, it narrowly outsold the Cadillac brand in 1929 and its sales contributed to the survival of the division during the Depression. Nevertheless, as the economy improved throughout the 1930s, LaSalle's niche dried up as the gap between Buick and Cadillac narrowed. In its final model year of 1940, LaSalles comprised about 65 percent of Cadillac's total output, but it was replaced in 1941 by the Cadillac Series 61. The LaSalle name has been occasionally floated for revival; a 1955 concept car was titled the "LaSalle II", and the name reappeared in 1963 and 1975 as proposals for what eventually became the Buick Riviera and Cadillac Seville, respectively. Earl, having gotten his start with the 1927 LaSalle, was later acclaimed as the "dean of design" of automobiles.

Pontiac had the opposite destiny. Selling more than 75,000 units in 1926, Pontiac saw a rise to 140,000 units in 1927 and more than 200,000 in 1928. Oakland was discontinued in 1931, a victim of the Depression; its final model, which had been based on the Viking V8, became the Pontiac V8 for 1932. Pontiac earned the distinction of being the only GM make that was not an outside acquisition that survived for a significant amount of time. The marque remained in production until 2010, when it was discontinued in the aftermath of the Great Recession as part of GM's reorganization from recession-caused bankruptcy.

The companion make program as a whole was described by automotive historian Bill Vance as a "short-lived experiment" in a retrospective of the Marquette. Vance unfavorably compared the program to Sloan's earlier paring down of GM's line after the Durant ouster. A report on the Viking referred to the program as "several 'in-between' cars introduced by General Motors while the Twenties still roared and the stock market hadn't crashed."

== See also ==
- List of GM factories

== Works cited ==
- Farber, David R. (2002). Sloan Rules: Alfred P. Sloan and the triumph of General Motors. Chicago: University of Chicago Press. ISBN 9780226238043.
- Auto editors of Consumer Guide (1985). Great Cars of the Forties. New York: Beekman House. ISBN 9780517479322.
- Kimes, Beverly Rae (1989). Standard Catalog of American Cars, 1805–1942. Iola, Wisconsin: Krause Publications. ISBN 0-87341-478-0.
- Ludvigsen, Karl E.; Burgess Wise, David; Laban, Brian (1979). The Encyclopedia of the American Automobile (1982 ed.). New York: Exeter. ISBN 9780896731325.
