= Marquette (automobile) =

Automobile manufacturer

Coordinates: 43.417778°N 83.964444°W

Marquette Motor Car Company
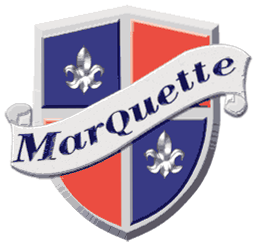
- Type: Subsidiary
- Industry: Automotive
- Predecessor: Rainier Motor Car Company
- Founded: 1909
- Founder: William C. Durant
- Defunct: 1912; 114 years ago
- Fate: Company closed in 1912. The "Marquette" brand was later revived for Buick in 1929
- Headquarters: Saginaw, Michigan, U.S.
- Products: Luxury vehicles
- Parent: General Motors (1909–12)

Marquette was an American automobile manufacturer established by General Motors in 1909 after the purchase of the Rainier Motor Car Company. The Marquette Company did not last long and in 1912 GM announced the company would be closed.

The Marquette brand had been used before by the Berwick Auto Car Company in 1904, and then by the Buick division of GM for a car series released in 1929. The brand was then discontinued by GM and has not been used since.

== History ==
=== Company ===
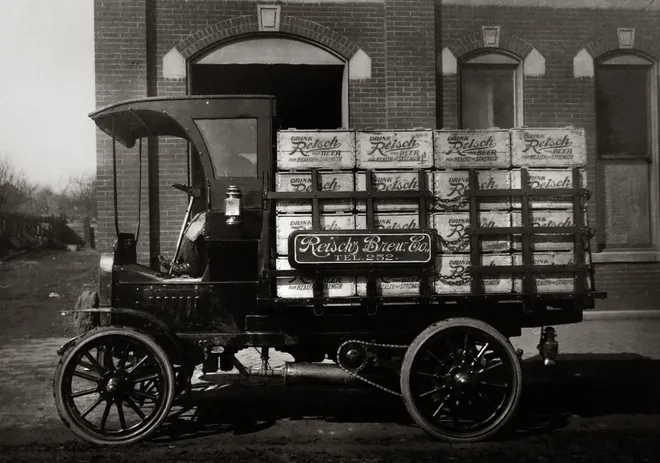
A 1906 Marquette truck from when Marquette was a Berwick name. This truck was used to deliver Reisch beer.

The name Marquette was first used for an automobile when the Berwick Auto Car Company of Grand Rapids, Michigan, frequently took it as a model designation for their electric car in 1904.

One of the General Motors founders, William Durant, bought the Rainier Motor Car Company in May 1909. Rainier was in severe financial trouble at the moment of the purchase. Following that, a new company, the Marquette Motor Company was established in Saginaw, Michigan, to continue production of the luxurious 'Rainier' motor car until 1911. They manufactured parts for another luxury make belonging to General Motors, the Welch Motor Car Company (1903–1911), and its lower-priced sister car, the Welch-Detroit (1910–1911).

Management was controlled by Buick officers. After Durant left GM for the first time in September 1910, it tried to make both the Rainier and the Welch profitable with the Marquette, a new make was introduced. It produced two car lines, both with huge 4-cylinder engines. The 40 hp line, essentially an improved and elongated Rainier (122 instead of 120 in. wheelbase), was available in four open body styles:

- Model 22 2-passenger runabout
- Model 24 4-passenger tourabout
- Model 25 5-passenger touring
- Model 27 7-passenger touring

The chassis had a wheelbase of 122 inches. Each sold for US$3,000. ($103,661 in 2025 dollars)

The 45 hp line consisted of one model only, the Model 28 7-passenger touring. It had a wheelbase of 119 inches, and sold for $4,000. ($138,214 in 2025 dollars

This reorganization was not successful, and GM announced the end of the Marquette in 1912. It appears that some of the last pre-war Marquettes were labeled "Peninsular". The plant then closed in 1913. During World War I, the plant was reopened and used to manufacture mortar shells for the US Ordnance Corps, then was repurposed for engine block casting when operations at Northway Motor and Manufacturing Division ended in 1925. The factory was repurposed as Chevrolet Saginaw Parts Plant which made many different types of parts and closed in 1983 and was demolished in 1984. Located on corner of 6th & Washington Avenues.

=== Buick brand ===
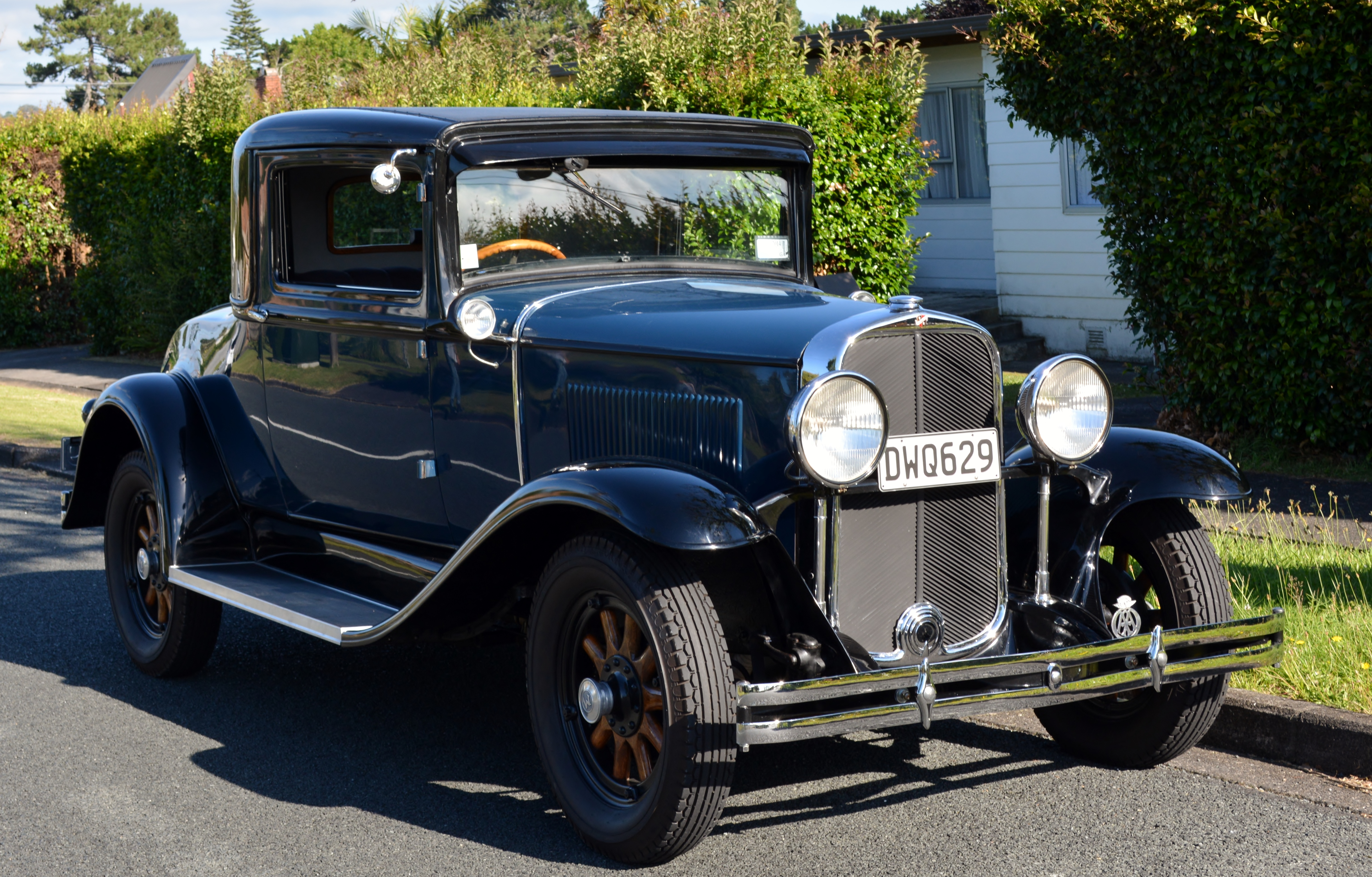
1930 Marquette

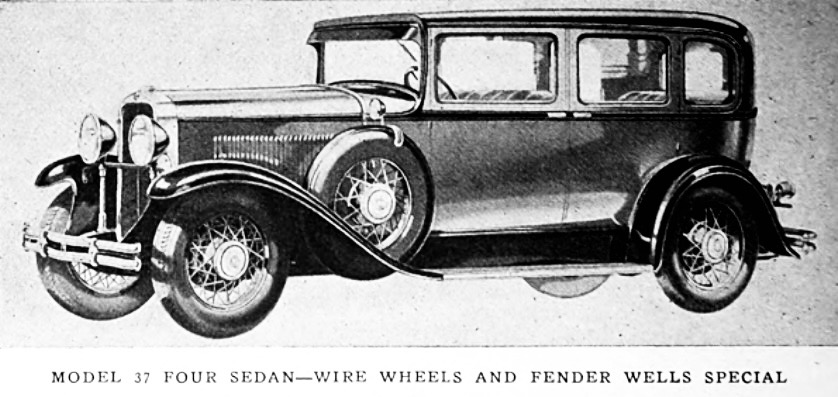
Marquette Model 37

The Marquette nameplate was revived when the Buick division of General Motors launched their junior brand for model year 1930. Along with Viking, LaSalle, and Pontiac, the Marquette was conceived to span a price gap in General Motors' market segmentation plan, and shared the GM B platform with the Buick Standard Six and Buick Master Six. Marquette was placed below Buick, but above Viking which was to be sold in Oldsmobile dealerships. The Marquette arrived in dealer showrooms on June 1, 1929.

The Marquette line rode on an 114 in (2,896 mm) wheelbase and was powered by an L-head straight six 212.8 cu in (3.5 L) producing 67 hp (50 kW) which was uncharacteristic of Buick products using overhead valves. Marquette was built to sell in the $1,000 range, and was available in a single car range. This Series 30 consisted of six body styles:

- Model 30 Two-Door Sedan
- Model 34 Sport Roadster
- Model 35 Phaeton
- Model 36 Business Coupe (2 pass.)
- Model 36S Special Coupe (2/4 pass.)
- Model 37 Sedan

The Marquette's most distinctive styling feature was its herringbone grille. Reviewers at the time described it either looking like a small Oldsmobile or small Cadillac.

Compared to Oldsmobile's Viking, which enjoyed a total production run of only 7,224 over three model years (1929, 1930, 1931) Marquette produced 35,007 vehicles in the U.S. during its brief one year life span; additionally, GM Canada turned out another 6,535 Marquettes.

Despite its promising first year sales, two factors worked against the Marquette. The first involved Oldsmobile, which lost sales to Marquette; the second was that Buick executives did not feel that enough Marquettes were sold to warrant the extra burden on the bottom line given the state of the economy. Buick gave no advance warning of the termination of the Marquette; just four months before the shutdown, 4,000 Marquette signs were shipped to dealers in the hope of better days ahead. The entry-level position held by Marquette was replaced by the new entry-level Buick Special.

After the shutdown of Marquette, the engine production tools were shipped to Germany, where it was used to power the original Opel Blitz. This was the first link between Opel and Buick, a sporadic tie-up which was to last until General Motors finally severed ties with Opel in the 21st century.
