= Buick =

Premium division of General Motors

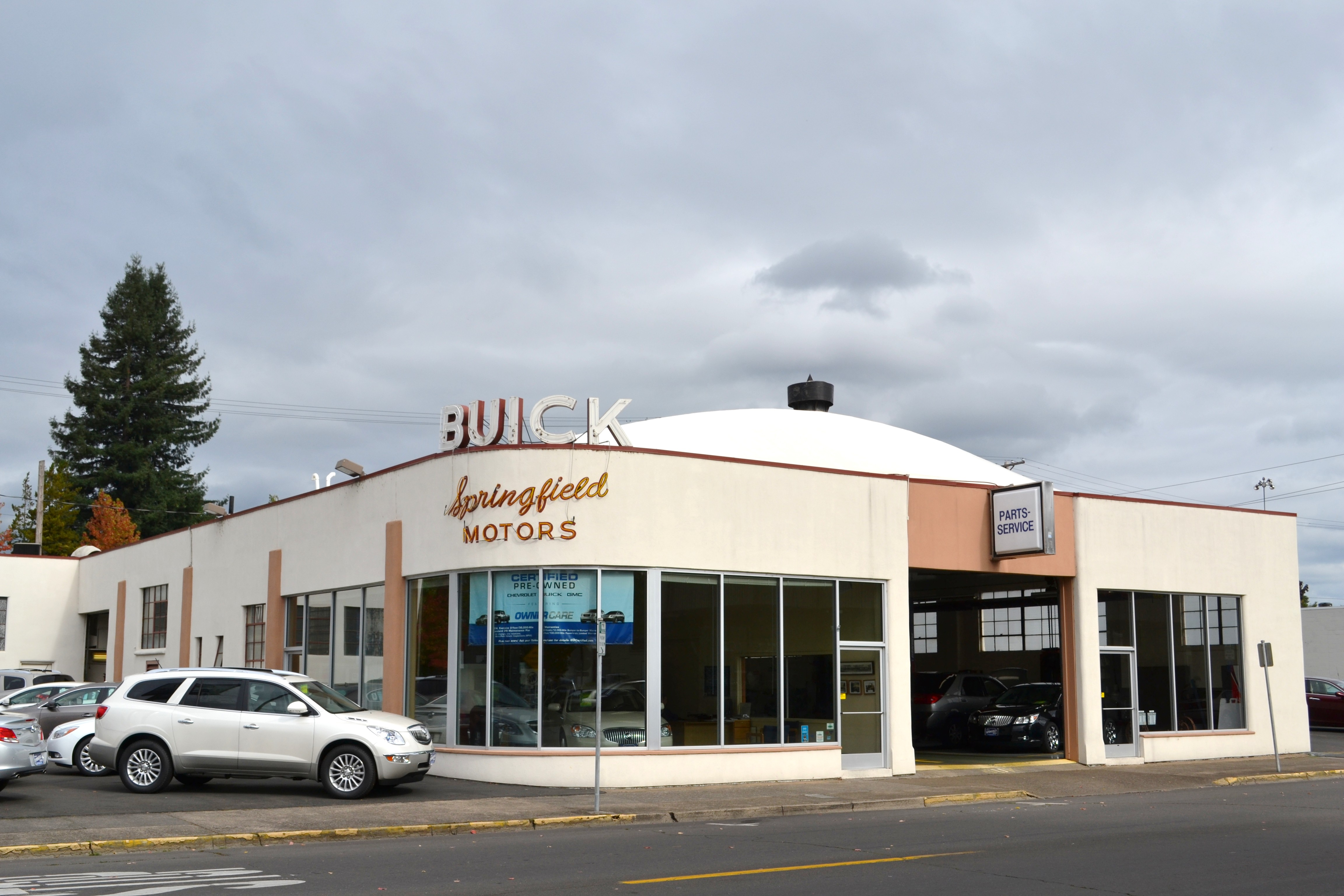
- Buick dealership in Springfield, Oregon
- Formerly: Buick Auto-Vim and Power Company (1899–1903); Buick Motor Company (1903–1908)
- Type: Division
- Industry: Automotive
- Founded: December 1899; 126 years ago
- Founder: David Dunbar Buick
- Headquarters: Detroit, Michigan, U.S.
- Area served: North America; Mainland China
- Key people: Michael Mcphee (vice president)
- Brands: Electra (EV)
- Parent: General Motors
- Website: buick.com

Buick (/ˈbjuːɪk/; BYOO-ik) is a division of the American automobile manufacturer, General Motors (GM). Started by automotive pioneer David Dunbar Buick in 1899, it was among the first American automobile brands and was the company that established General Motors in 1908. Before the establishment of General Motors, GM founder William C. Durant had served as Buick's general manager and major investor. With the demise of Oldsmobile in 2004, Buick became the oldest surviving American automobile brand.

GM positions Buick as a premium automobile brand in its portfolio, above the mainstream Chevrolet brand and below the luxury Cadillac division, although many vehicles share underlying platforms. In North America, Buick vehicles are typically sold alongside GMC vehicles, another premium marque, at multi-brand dealerships.

== History ==
=== Early years ===
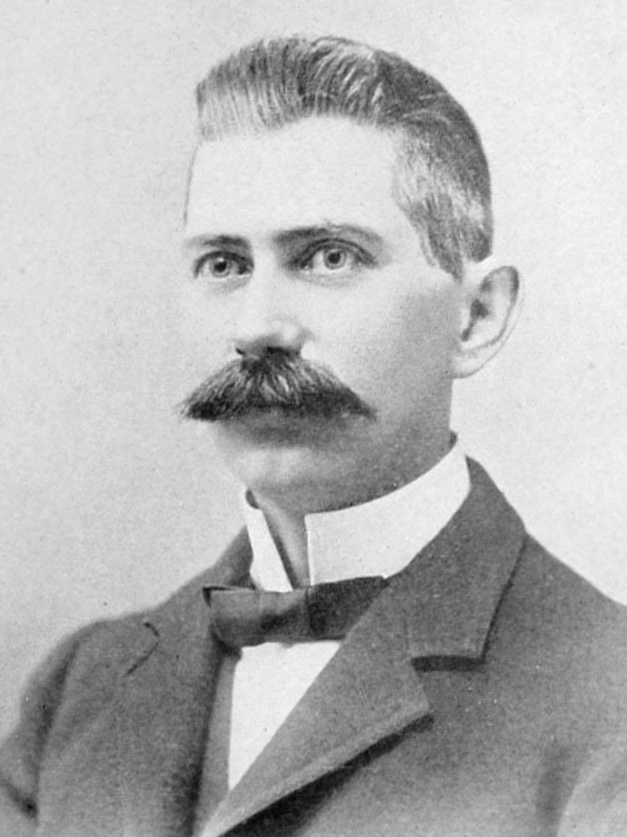
David Buick, founder of the Buick Motor Company

Buick is one of the oldest automobile brands in the world and is currently the oldest in the United States still active today. Autocar, founded in 1897, is the oldest motor vehicle manufacturer in the Western Hemisphere; while originally an automobile maker, Autocar now builds heavy trucks. Oldsmobile, also an early automaker founded in 1897, is now defunct; Studebaker was founded in 1852, but did not begin producing automobiles until 1902; Henry Ford produced his first car in 1896 but did not start the Ford Motor Company until 1903, and during the period in between was involved with other automobile manufacturers such as Cadillac, founded in 1902.

The first two Buick automobiles were made in 1899 and 1900 at the "Buick Auto-Vim and Power Company" by chief engineer Walter Marr, but company owner David Dunbar Buick was reluctant to begin making automobiles, being satisfied with stationary and marine engine production, so Marr left Buick in 1901 to found his own automobile company under his own name. His replacement was Eugene Richard, who applied for a patent in 1902 for Marr's valve-in-head (overhead valve) engine, which patent, number 771,095, was awarded to Richard in the name of Buick in 1904. In 1903, the third Buick automobile was made, this time by Richard, but in 1904 Buick, whose company was now called "Buick Motor Company", moved from Detroit to Flint, Michigan, and Richard stayed behind. Marr was rehired in Flint as chief engineer, to begin making automobiles in production. That year, 37 Buick automobiles were made, production increasing to 750 in 1905, 1,400 in 1906, 4,641 in 1907, and 8,820 in 1908, taking the number one spot away from close competitors Ford, Maxwell and Olds Motor Works. Buick proclaimed themselves the largest car manufacturer in the world this year.

David Buick incorporated his company as the Buick Motor Company on May 19, 1903, in Detroit, Michigan. Buick had been financed by a friend and fellow automobile enthusiast, Benjamin Briscoe, who in September 1903 sold control of the business to James H. Whiting, of Flint Wagon Works, in Flint, Michigan. Whiting moved Buick to Flint, to a location across the street from his factory, with the idea of adding Buick's engines to his wagons. David Buick stayed on as a manager and re-hired Walter Marr as chief engineer. The engine Buick and Marr developed for this automobile was a two-cylinder valve-in-head engine of 159 cubic inches, with each cylinder horizontal and opposed to the other by 180 degrees.

Whiting built only a few automobiles in 1904, the Model B, before running out of operating capital, causing him to bring in William C. Durant that year as a controlling investor. Durant built a few more model B's in 1904, stepped up production for the model C in 1905, and spent the next four years turning Buick into the biggest-selling automobile brand in the US.

During the 19th century, Durant had made his fortune as co-owner, also in Flint, with Josiah Dallas Dort, of the Durant-Dort Carriage Company, which by 1904 was the largest carriage-making company in the country and one of the largest in the world. Durant moved most Buick production to the former Durant-Dort Imperial Wheel plant in Jackson, Michigan in 1905. Buick continued car production in Jackson through 1907, when Factory #1 was completed in Flint. The Jackson plant continued production with Buick trucks through 1912. David Buick sold his stock upon departure in 1906, making him a wealthy man, but he died in modest circumstances 25 years later. In 1907, Durant agreed to supply motors to R. S. McLaughlin in Canada, an automaker, and in 1908 he founded General Motors.

Between 1899 and 1902, two prototype vehicles were built in Detroit, Michigan by Walter Lorenzo Marr. Some documentation exists of the 1901 or 1902 prototype with tiller steering similar to the Oldsmobile Curved Dash.

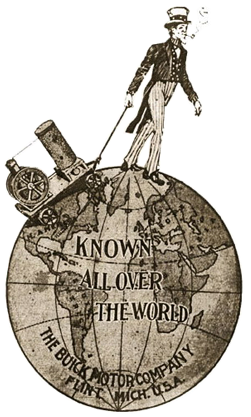
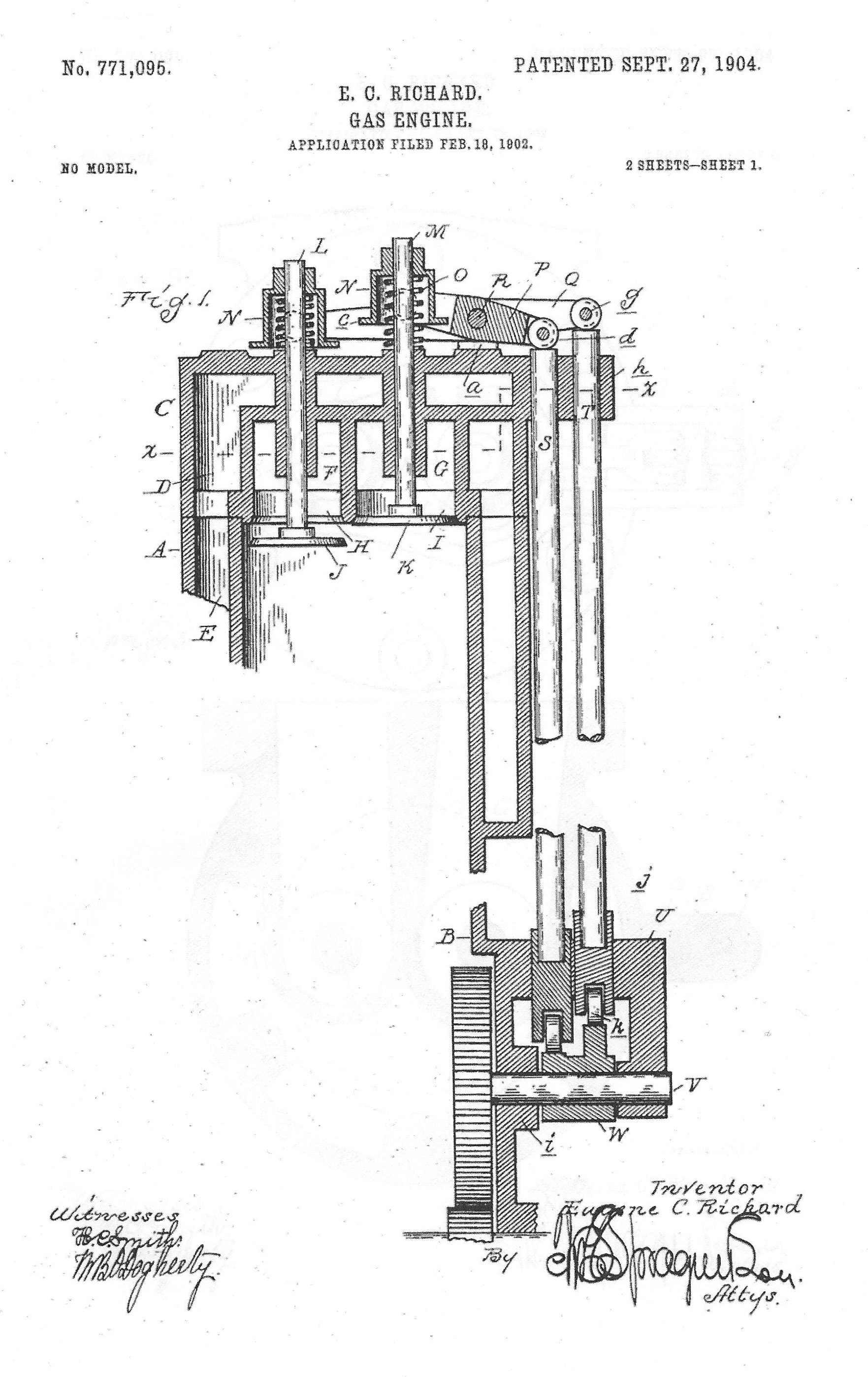
(Left); the first logo of Buick (1904), with an image of the Uncle Sam and the legend "known all over the world"; (right): Valve-In-Head (OHV) engine, illustration from 1904 patent, Buick Manufacturing Company

In mid-1904, another prototype was constructed for an endurance run, which convinced Whiting to authorize the production of the first models offered to the public. The architecture of this prototype was the basis for the Model B.

The first Buick made for sale, the 1904 horizontally opposed 2-cylinder engine Model B, was built in Flint, Michigan at a re-purposed factory that was known as the Flint Wagon Works. There were 37 Buicks made that year, none of which survive. There are, however, two replicas in existence: the 1904 endurance car, at the Buick Gallery & Research Center in Flint, and a Model B assembled by an enthusiast in California for the division's 100th anniversary. Both of these vehicles use various parts from Buicks of that early era, as well as fabricated parts. These vehicles were each constructed with the two known surviving 1904 engines.

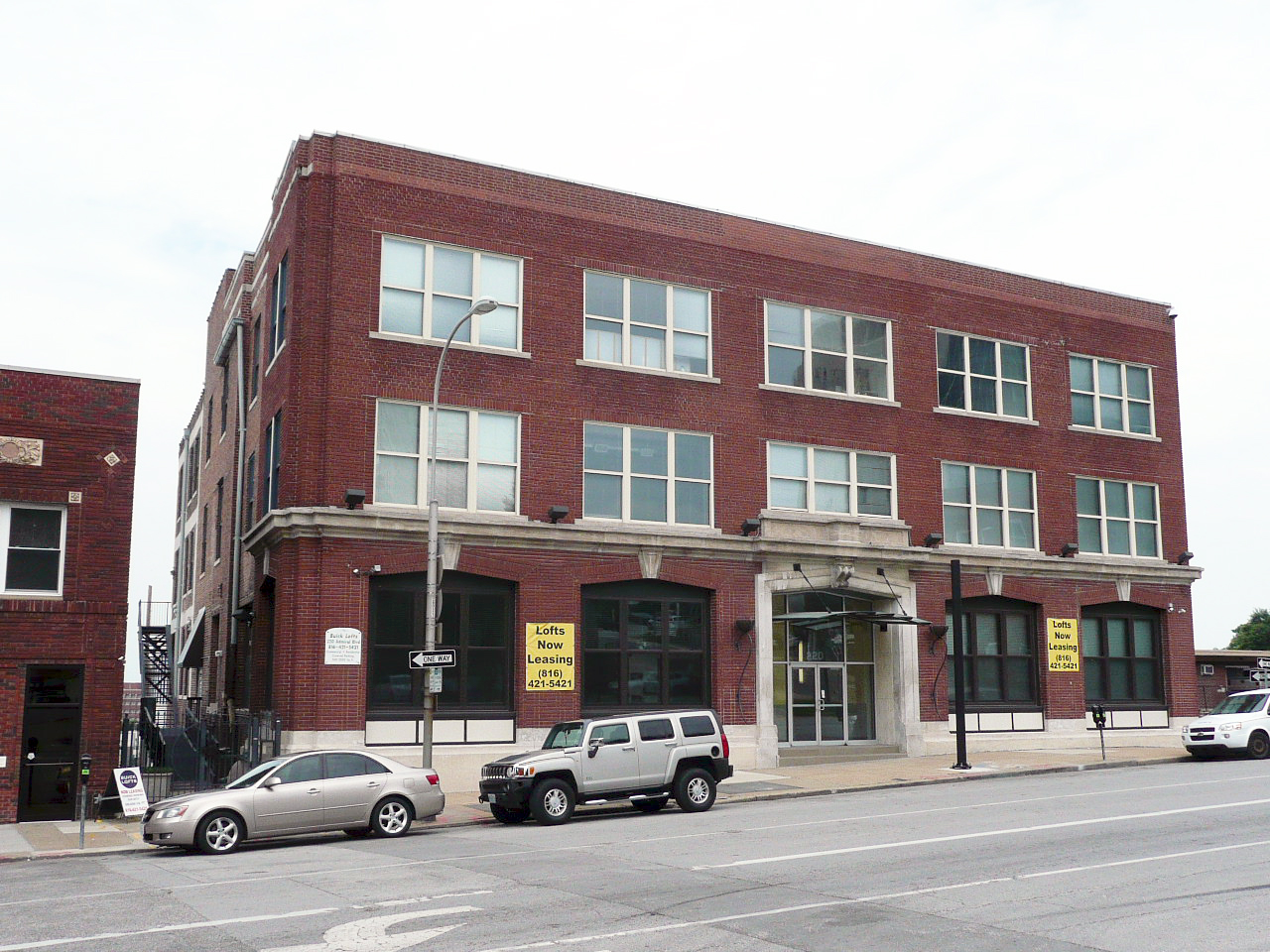
The Buick Automobile Company Building (here pictured in 2015), built in 1907

The early success of Buick is attributed mainly to what it called the valve-in-head engine, now known as the overhead valve (OHV), engine patented by Eugene Richard and developed by Richard, Buick, and Marr. The Model F had a two-cylinder engine, an 87-inch wheelbase, and weighed 1,800 lbs. The creation of General Motors is attributed mainly to the success of Buick, so it can be said Marr and Richard's designs directly led to GM. The power train and chassis architecture introduced on the Model B was continued through the 1909 Model F.

The Model F was similar to the Model G, a lower-priced two-seat roadster, produced from 1906 until 1909. Both the F and G were powered by a 159 cu in (2.6 L) two-cylinder 159 engine producing 22 hp (16 kW; 22 PS) along with a 2-speed transmission as well as mechanical brakes on the rear wheels.

The flat-twin engine is inherently balanced, with torque presented to the chassis in a longitudinal manner. The engine was mounted amidships.

Billy Durant was a promoter, and Buick soon became the largest carmaker in America. Durant embarked on a series of corporate acquisitions, calling the new firm General Motors. At first, the manufacturers comprising General Motors competed against each other, but Durant ended that. He wanted each General Motors division to target one class of buyers. Buick was positioned below the Cadillac brand. To save on resources, Buick vehicles shared a common platform, called the GM A platform, that was shared with Chevrolet, Oakland, Oldsmobile, and Cadillac.

At first, Buick followed the likes of Napier in automobile racing, winning the first-ever race held at Indianapolis Motor Speedway.

The first full-size Buick to join the smaller Model B was in 1907, when the Buick Model D was introduced with a four-cylinder 255.0 cu in (4,178 cc) T-head engine, installed in the front with rear-wheel drive. This was one of the only cars with side valves that Buick ever made.

==== 1910s–1920s ====
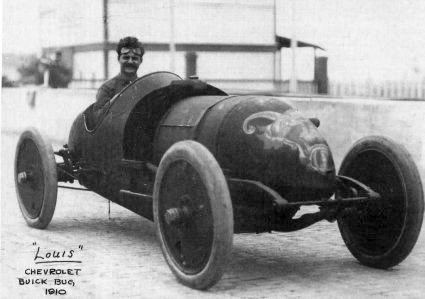
Louis Chevrolet in his Buick 60 Special (aka "Buick Bug") in 1910

In 1910, Buick introduced the Model 10 with an OHV four-cylinder engine followed in 1911, with their first closed-body car, the Buick Six, that followed the same bodystyle that first appeared at Cadillac, and four years ahead of Ford. The car was built at the all-new factory in Flint which later became known as Buick City. Buick during the 1920s made various sized vehicles, with series designations for different years, sometimes using numbers, while later years using lettered designations. One of the larger vehicles, with a straight-six, was the Buick Master Six. The Model 10 was phased out during a restructuring initiated by GM's new leadership that assumed position on November 15, 1910.

In the 1910s and 1920s, Buick was a prestige brand in the Republic of China with the brand driven by or for high-level politicians and the Emperor. The latter imported two Buick cars in 1924, making it the first automobile to enter China. By 1930, Buick claimed one-sixth of the total number of cars in the country. Buick now sells 80% of its production in the People's Republic of China and is a minor player in Taiwan.

In 1929, as part of General Motors' companion make program, Buick Motor Division launched the Marquette sister brand, designed to bridge the price gap between Buick and Oldsmobile. Its styling featured a high peaked hood and radiator shell while its suspension used four, parallel, semi-elliptical springs with Delco-Lovejoy shock absorbers. Marquette was discontinued in 1930. All Buick, Marquette, Viking, and Oldsmobile products shared the newly introduced GM B platform starting in 1926.

==== 1930s ====
Buick debuted two major achievements for the 1931 model year, the OHV Buick Straight-8 engine and a synchromesh transmission in all models but the Series 50. The Eight was offered in three displacements, the 220 cubic inch (bore 2 7/8 in. stroke 4.25 in.), was available in the Series 50 with 77 brake HP. The Series 60 engine was a 272 cu. in. unit (bore 3 1/16 in., stroke 5 in.) giving 90 brake HP. Cadillac had previously introduced the Cadillac Type 51 with a flathead V8 engine in 1915 which made usage of an eight-cylinder engine a luxury feature.

The Series 80 and Series 90 used a 344 cu. in. version (bore 3 5/16 in., stroke 5 in.) for 104 brake HP. Automatic vacuum-operated spark advance was another feature replacing the steering column-mounted spark lever although an emergency lever was now dash mounted. Buick scored another first in 1939 when it became the first company to introduce turn signals, which did not appear on other car brands until almost a decade later. All 1939 models also had a steering column-mounted shift lever.

In the mid-1930s McLaughlin-Buicks were purchased by British monarch Edward VIII. He had a preference for the Canadian built McLaughlin-Buick. Buicks were used for royal transport within Canada, including for King George VI and Queen Elizabeth during the 1939 royal tour of Canada.

In the 1920s and 1930s Cadillac and Buick vehicles were popular with long-distance passenger service operators e.g. the Nairn Transport Company in the Middle East (Baghdad-Damascus).

Buick in the early years

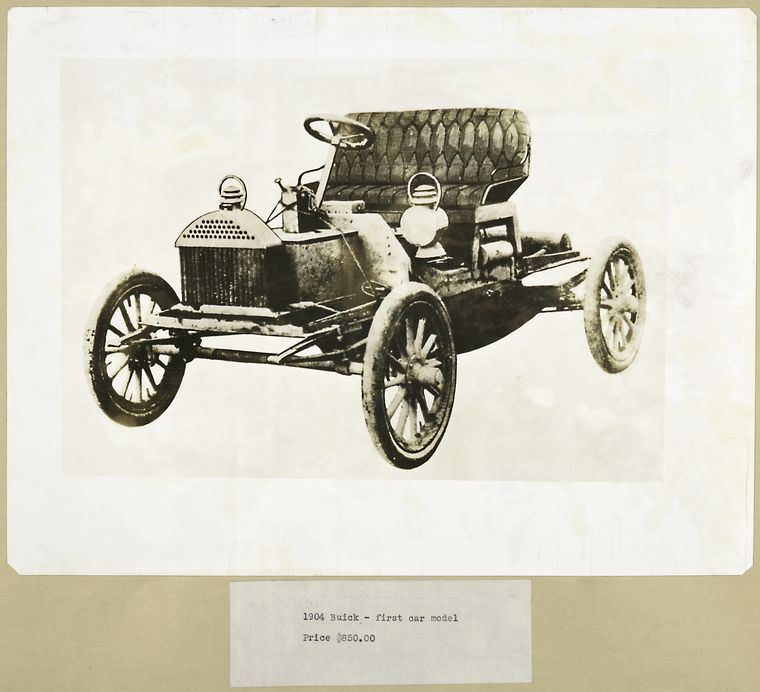
1904 Buick Model B

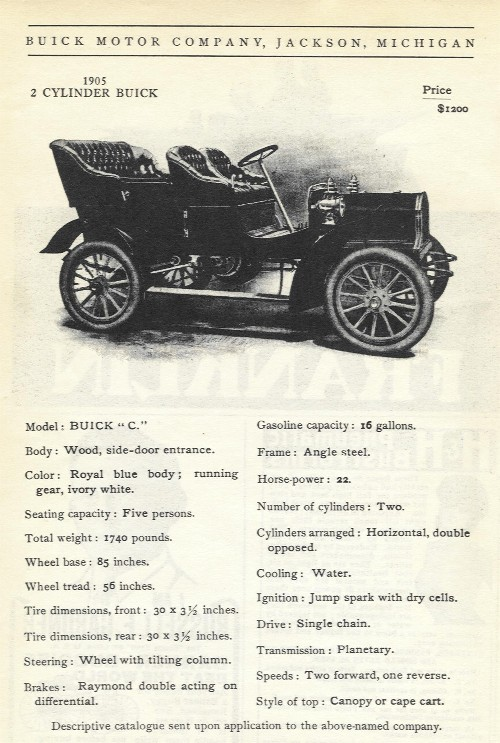
1905 Buick Model C

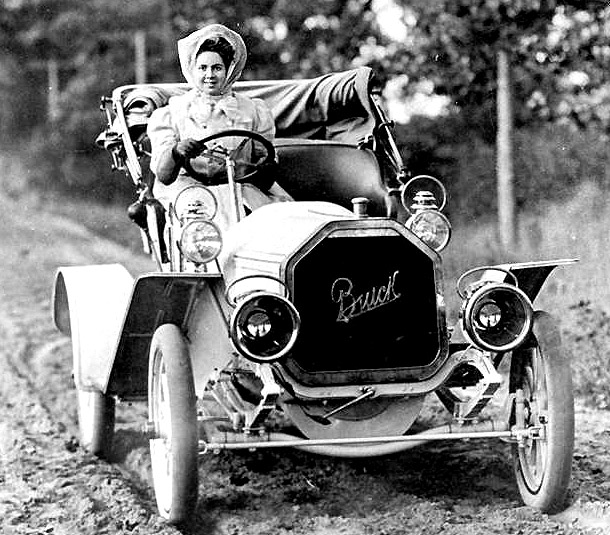
1910 Buick Model 10 Runabout

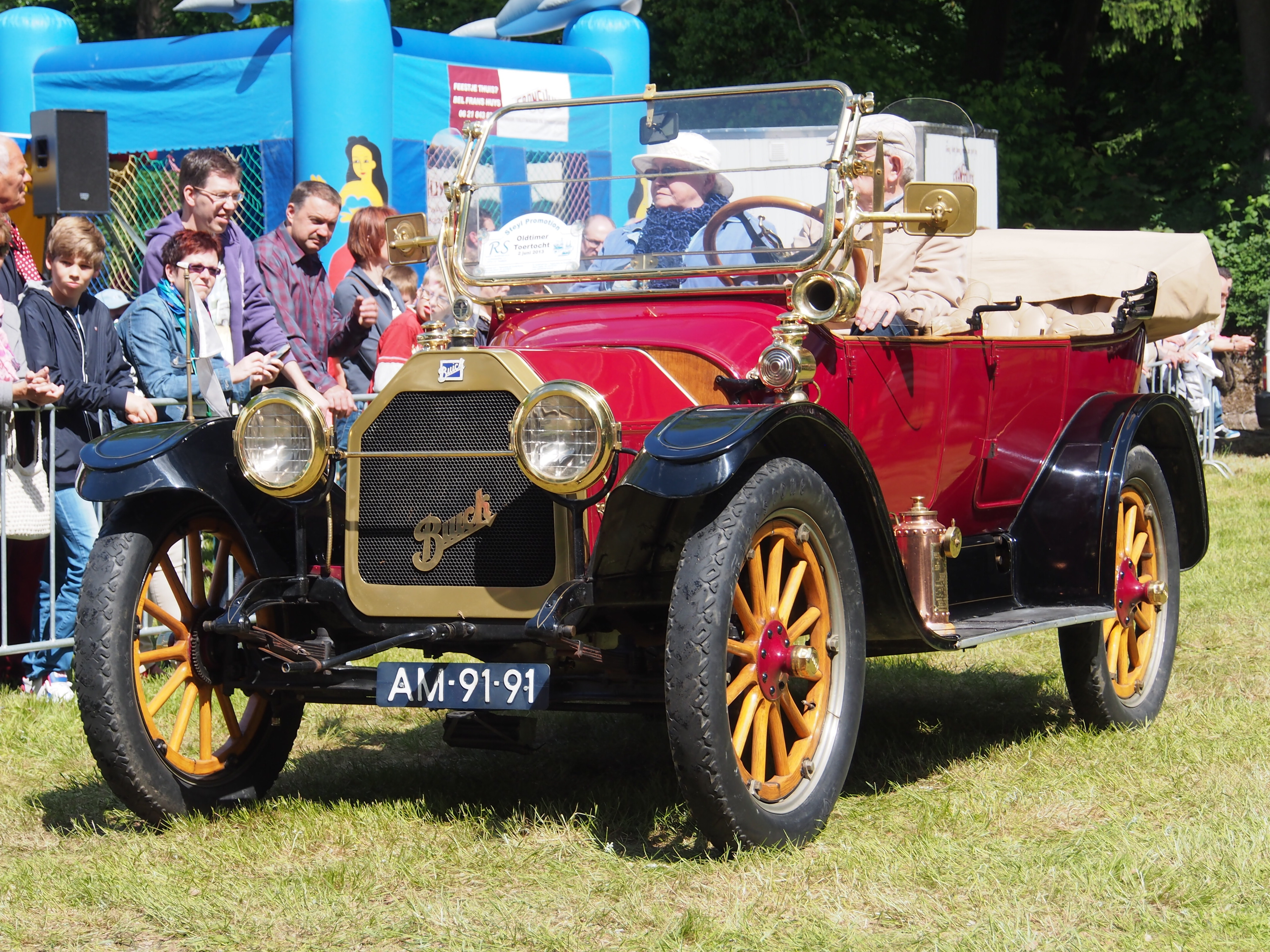
1914 Buick Six Model B-35 phaeton

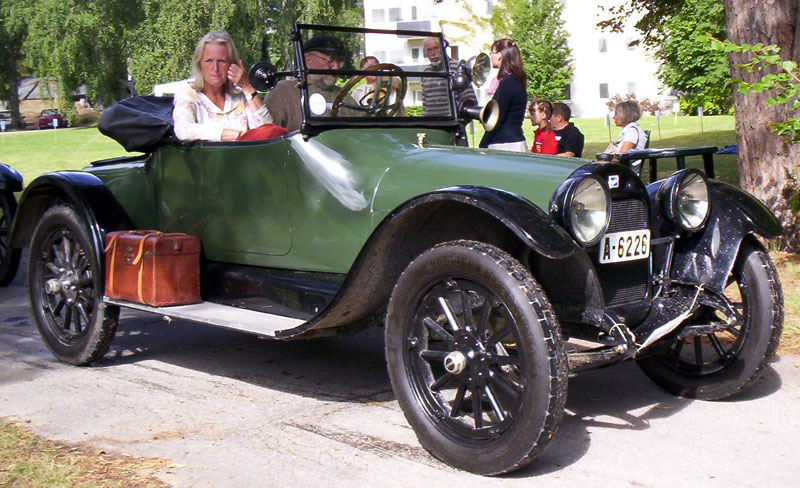
1917 Buick D-35 roadster

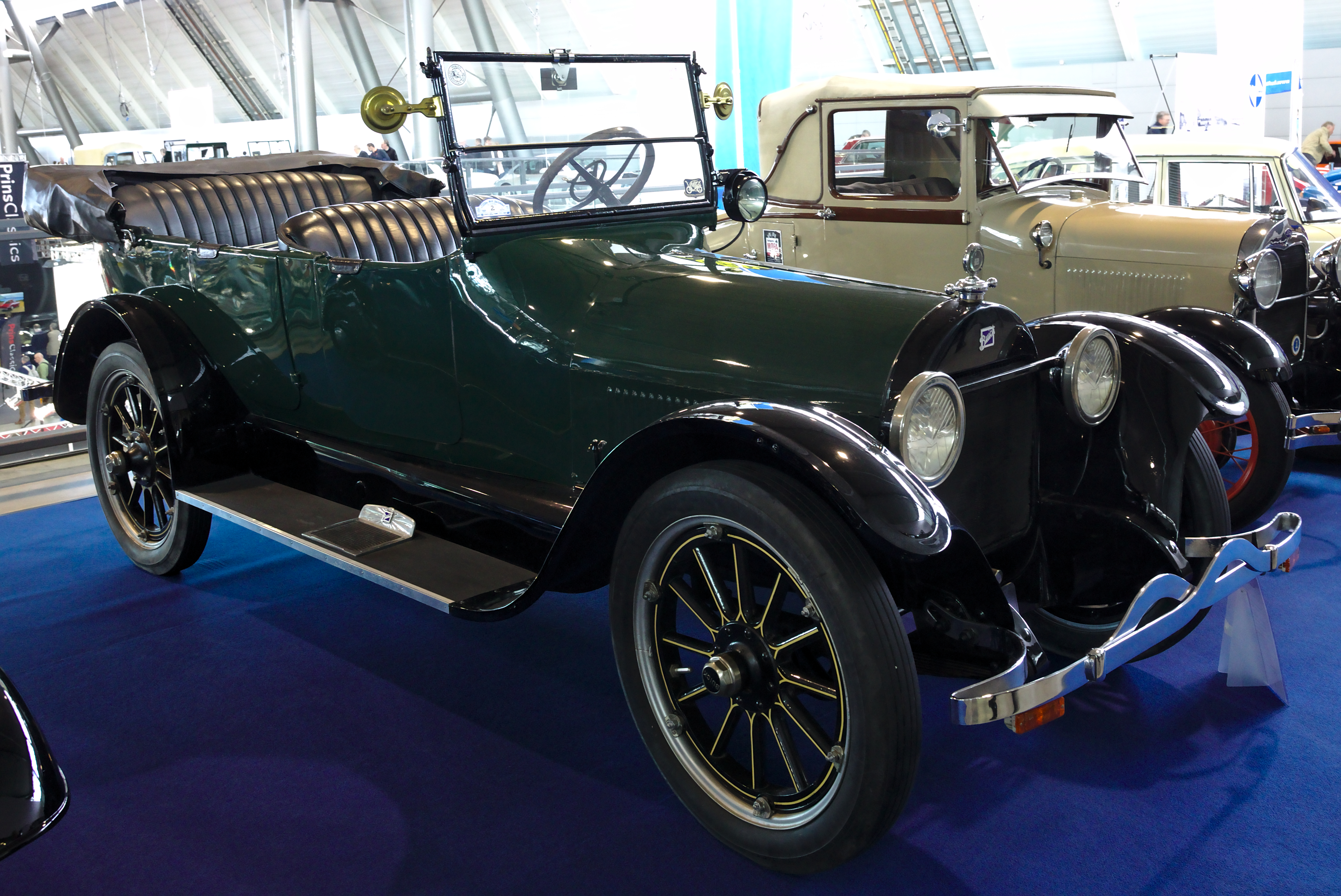
1918 Buick E-45

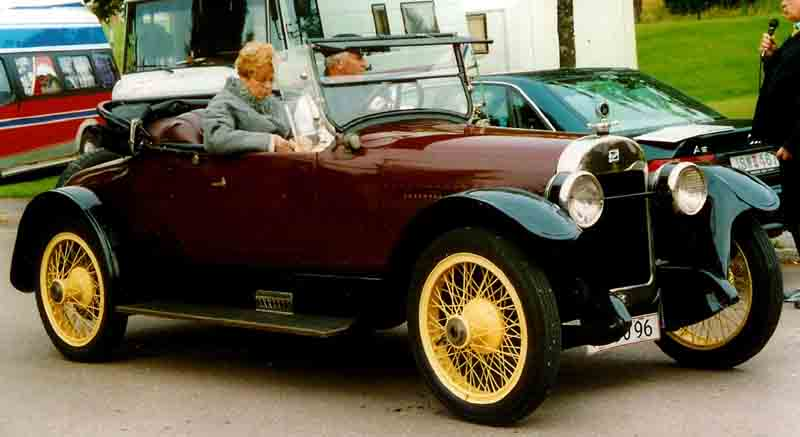
1922 Buick Model 22-54 Sport roadster

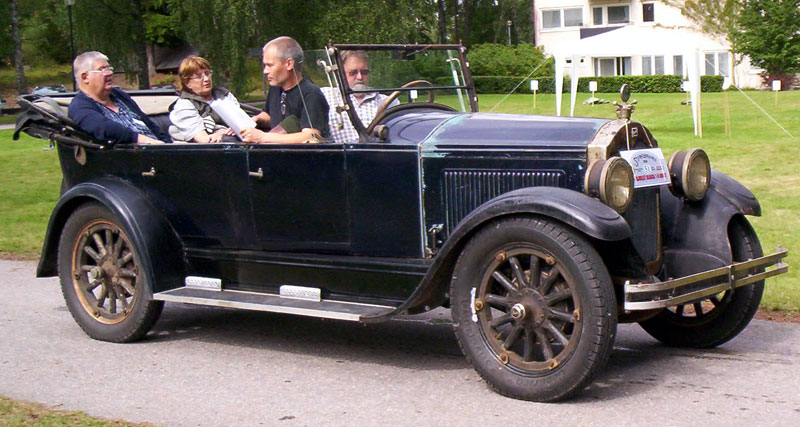
1925 Buick Master Six Series 25 touring

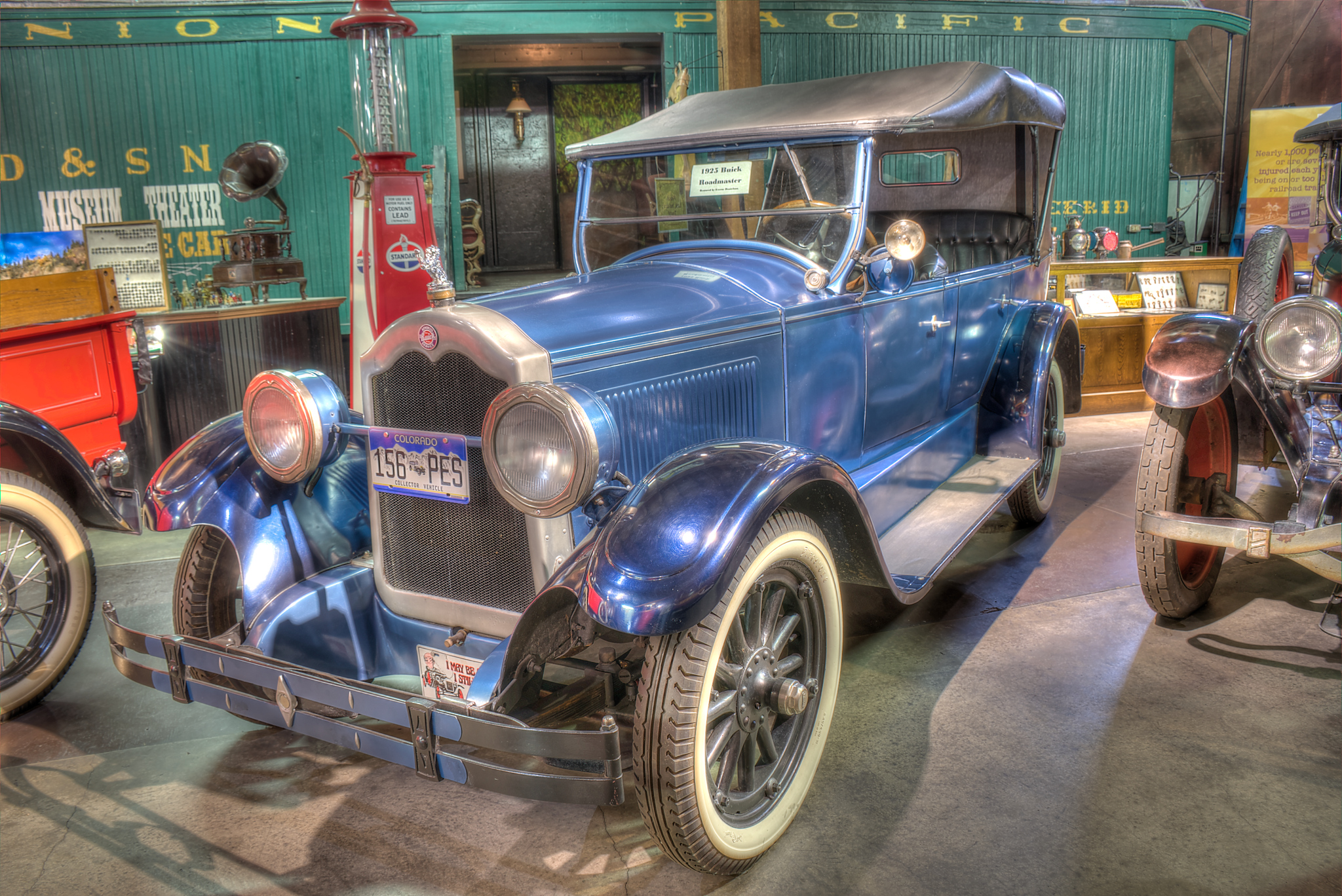
1925 Buick Master Six

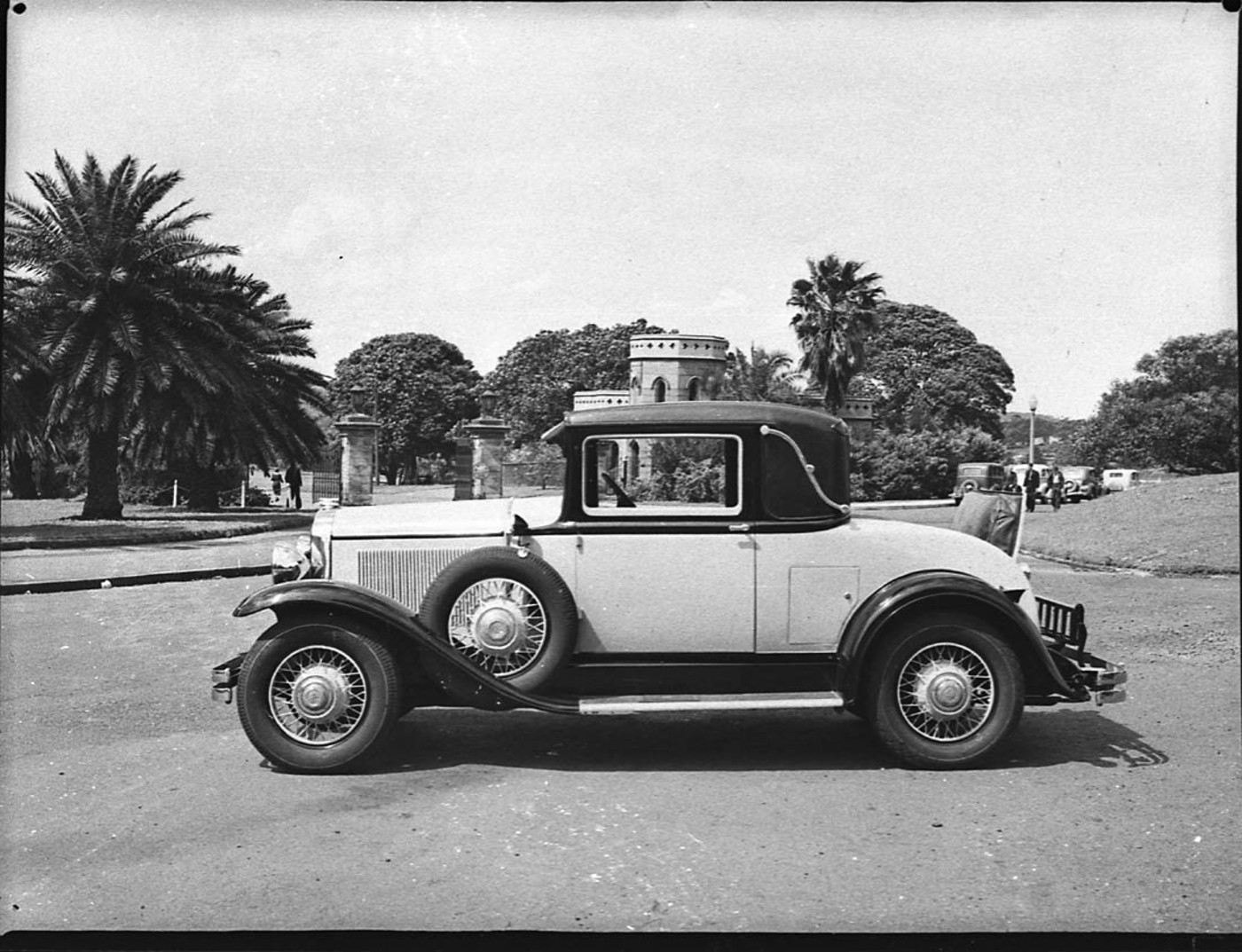
1929 Buick Series 46 Business Coupe

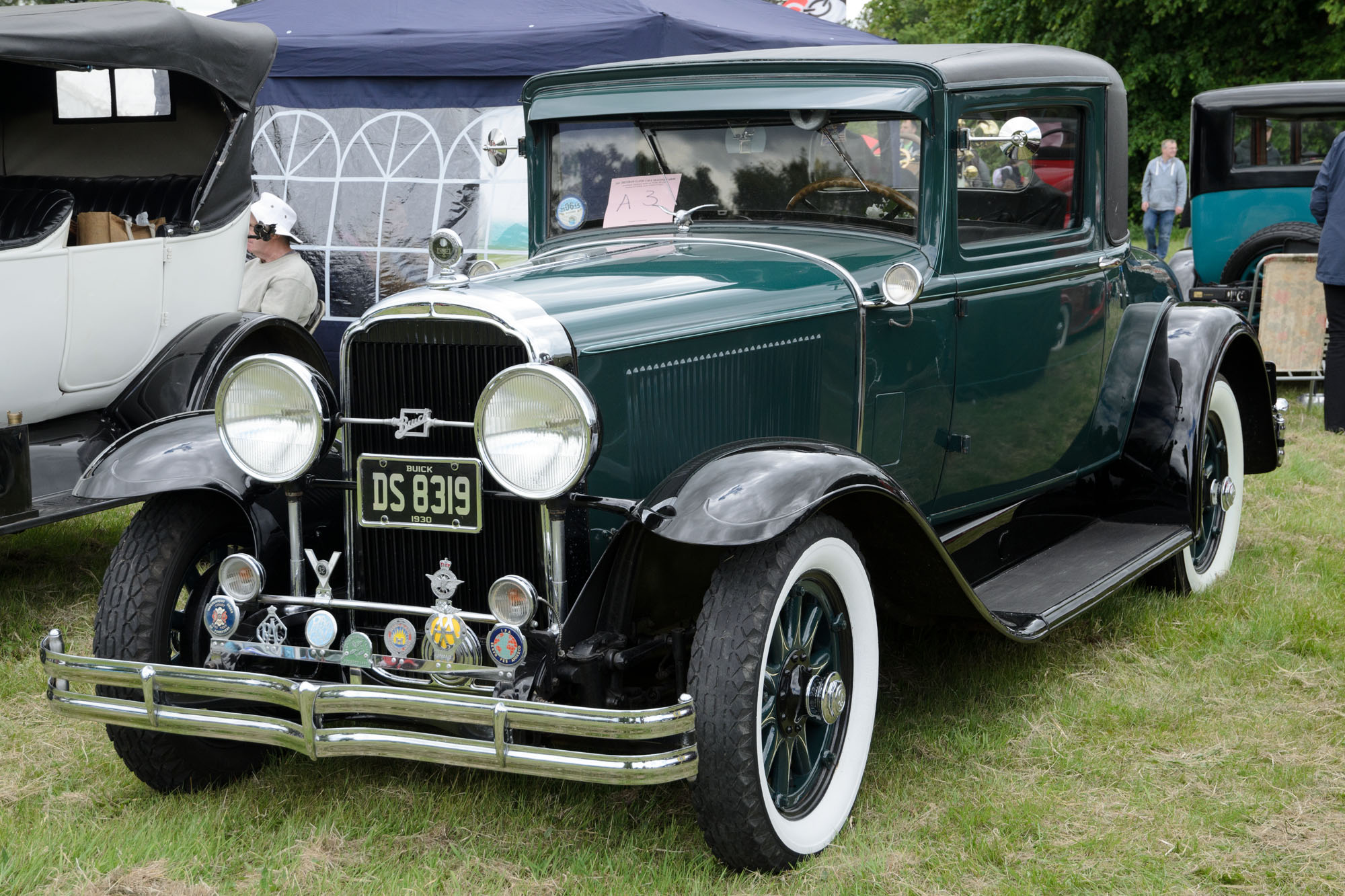
1930 Buick Series 46 Business Coupe

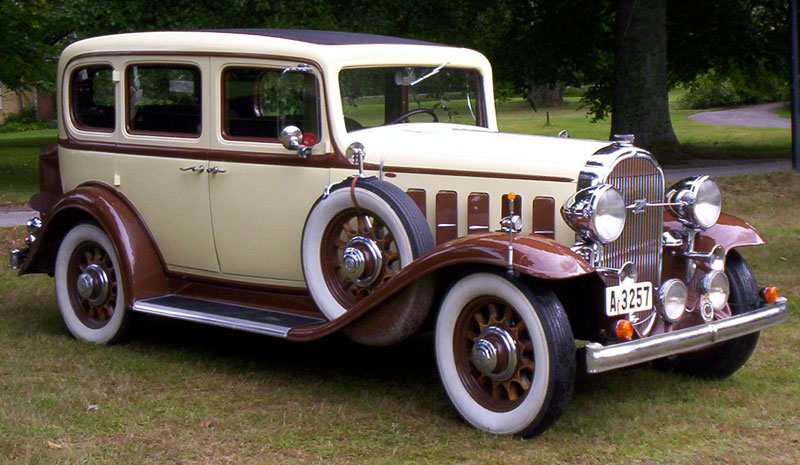
1932 Buick Series 60 Model 67 sedan

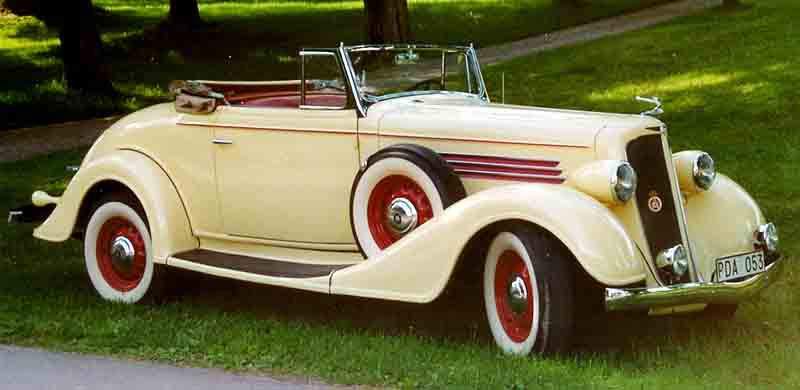
1935 Buick Series 40 Model 46C convertible coupe

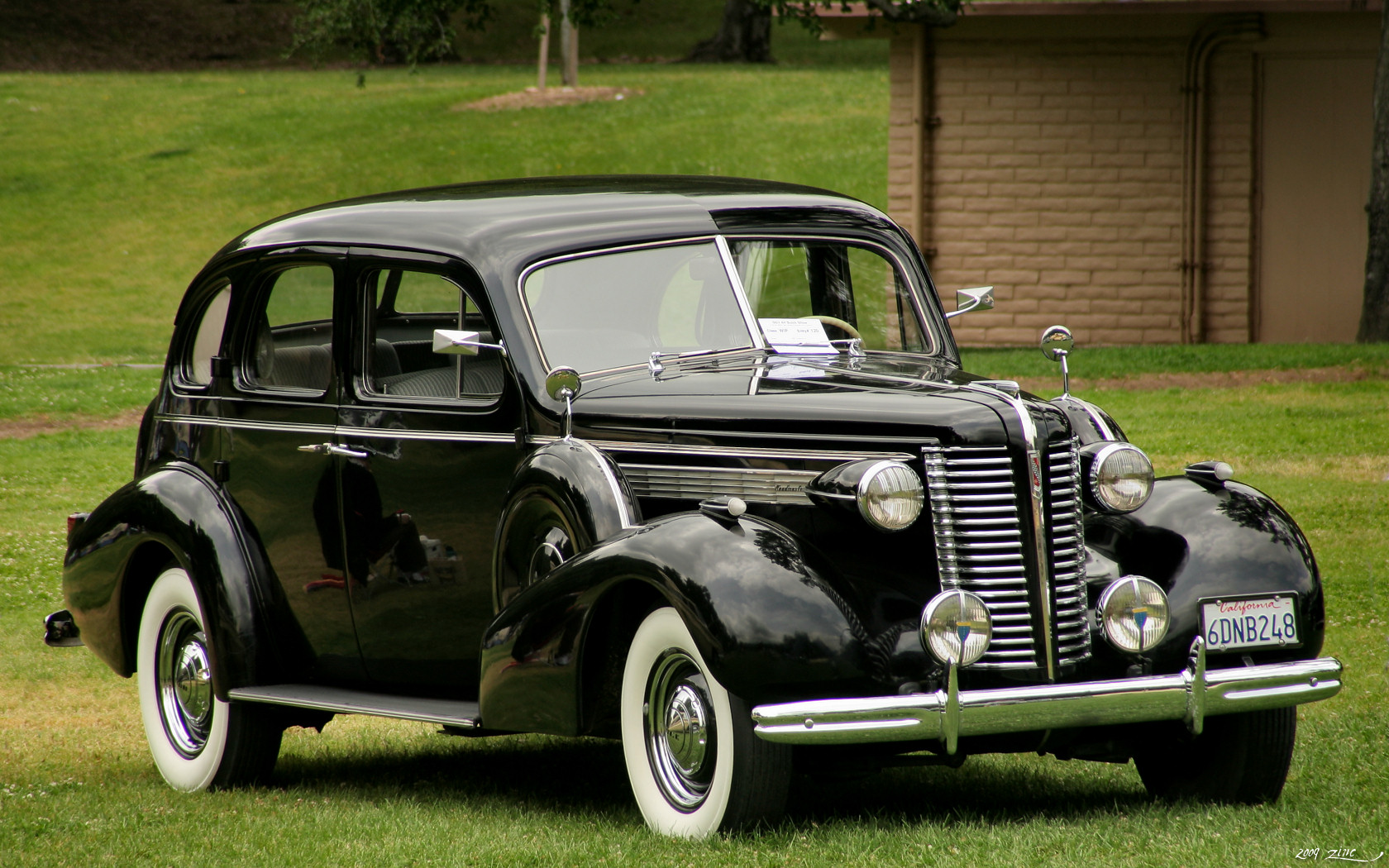
1938 Buick Series 80 touring sedan

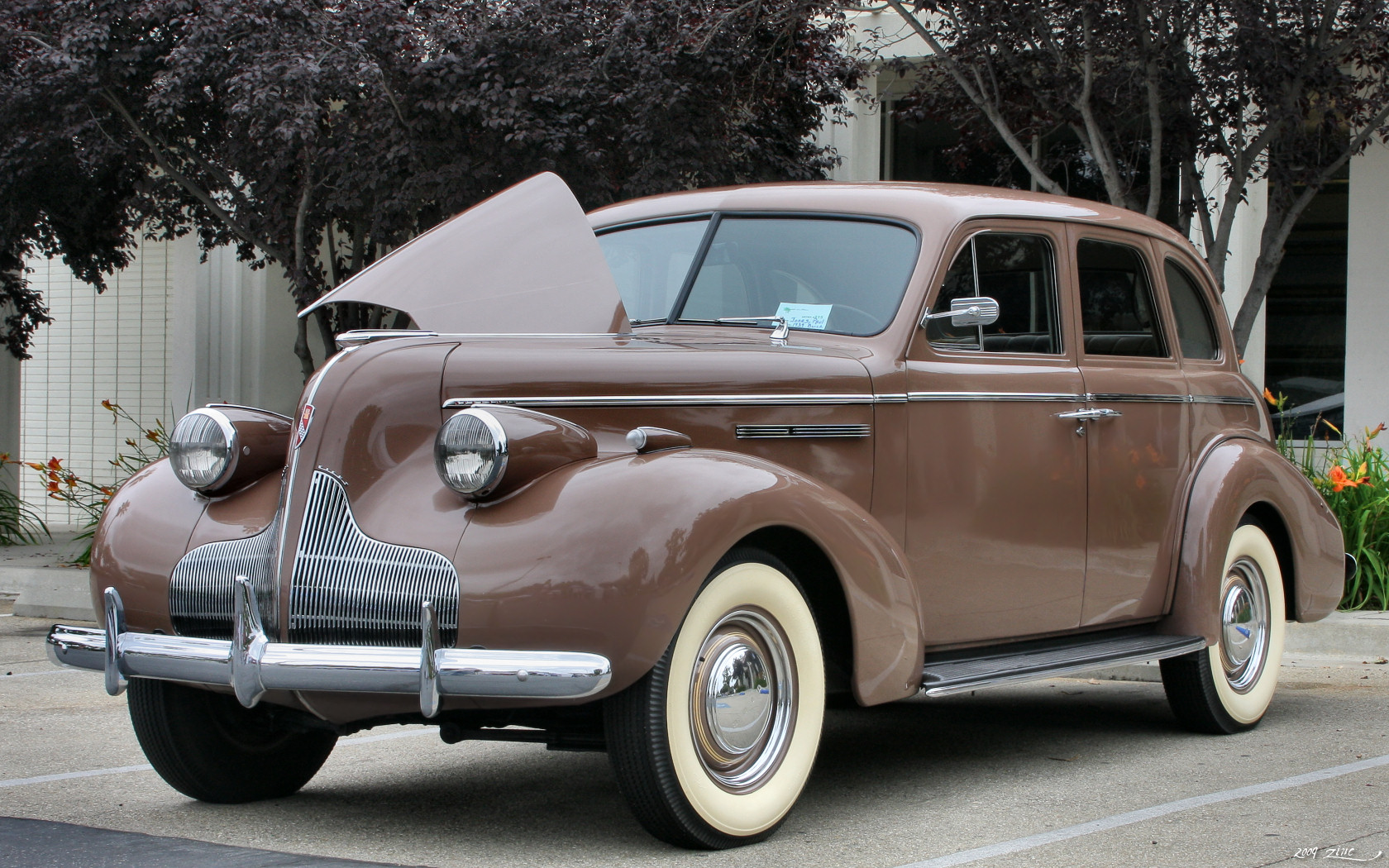
1939 Buick Series 40 Model 41 touring sedan

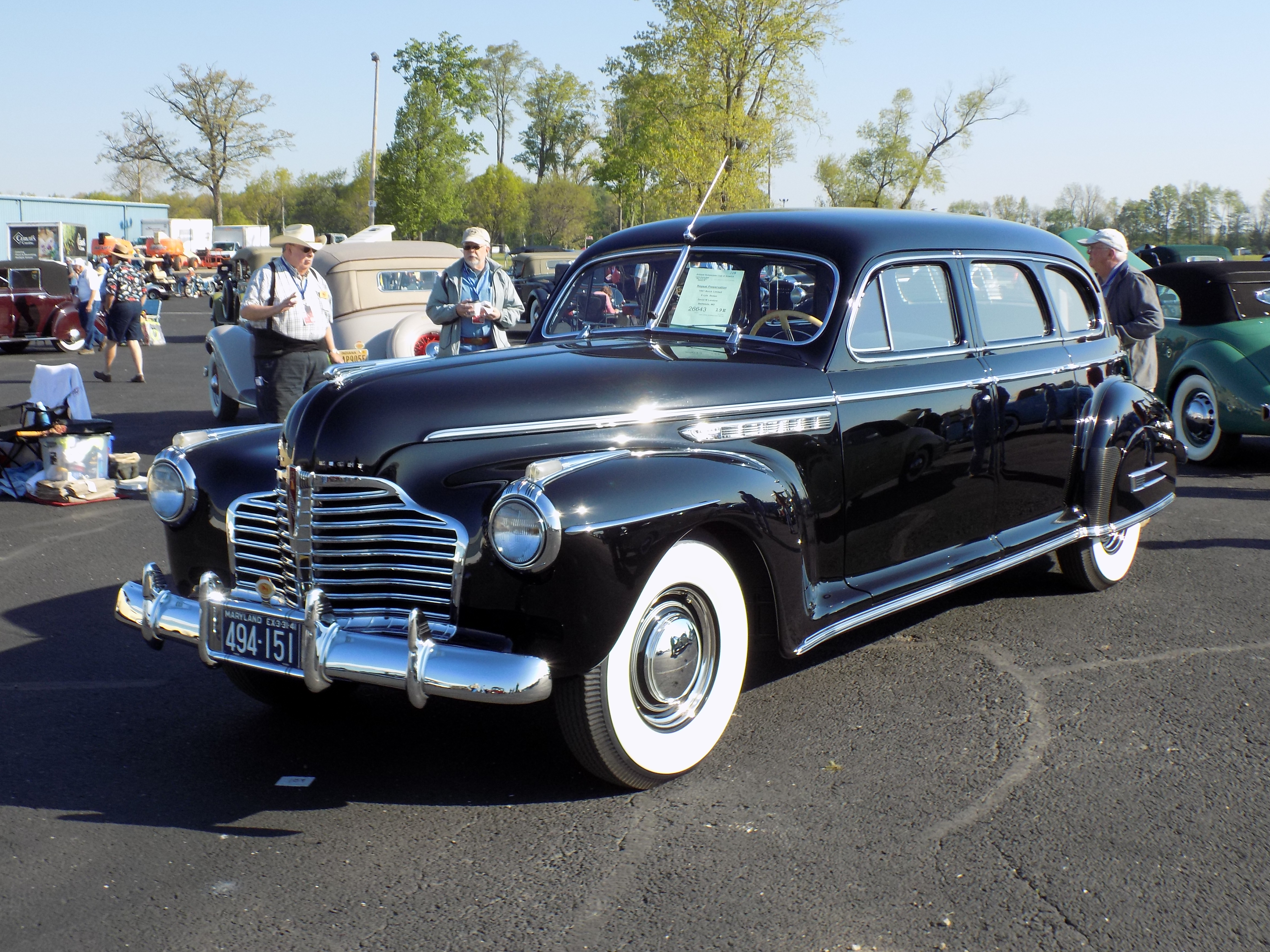
1941 Buick Series 90 Touring Sedan Model 90

=== Post World War II years ===
1940s–1950s

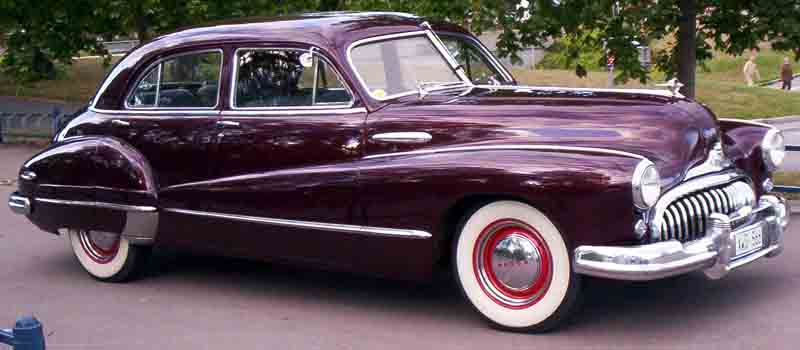
1947 Buick Super

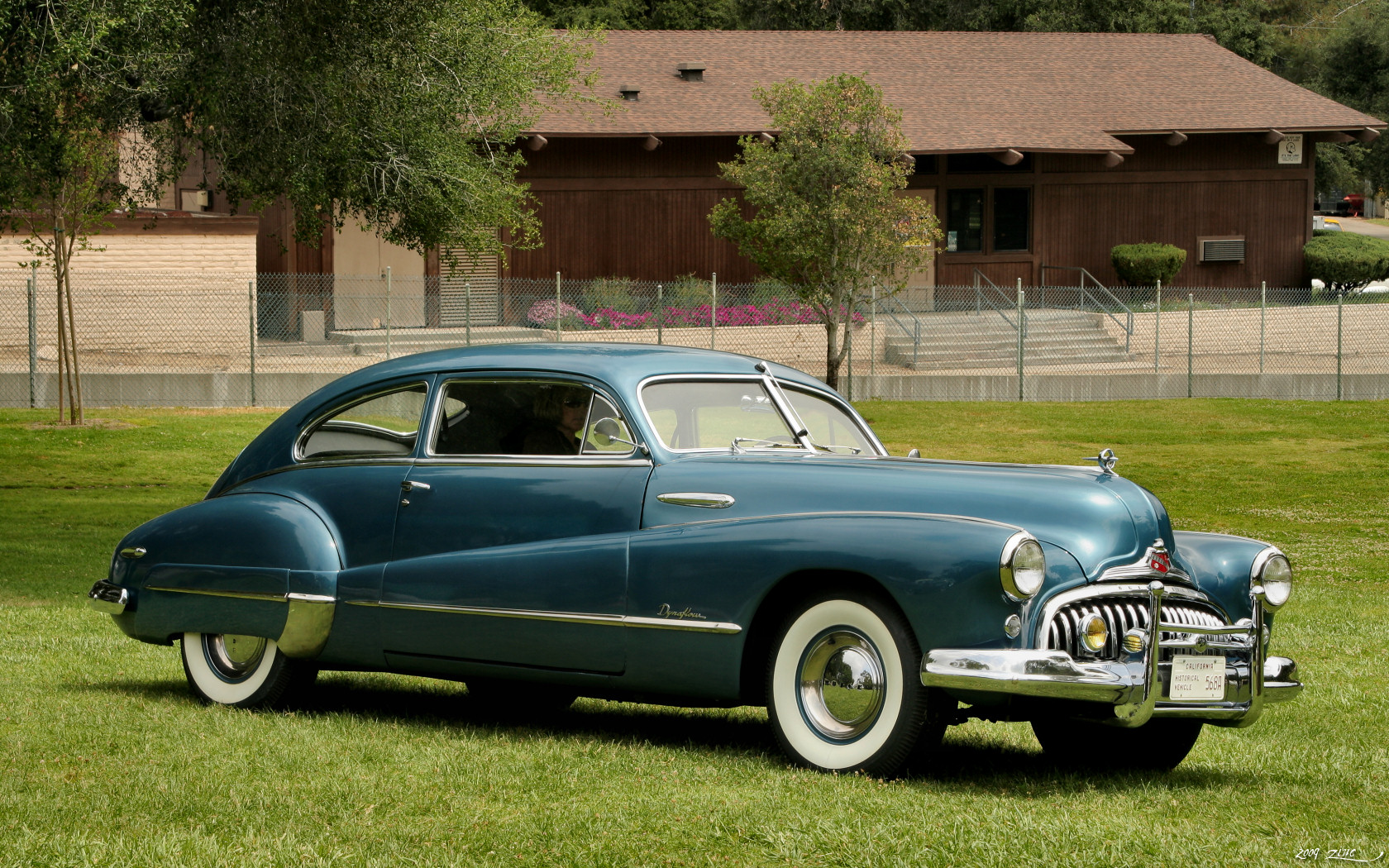
1948 Buick Roadmaster Sedanet

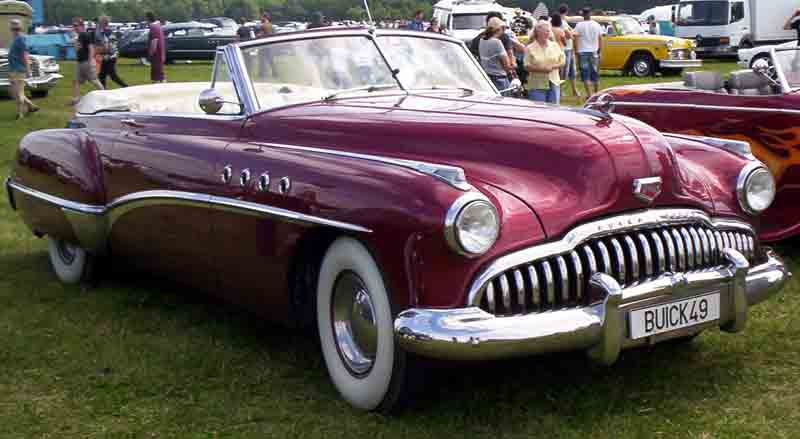
1949 Buick Roadmaster

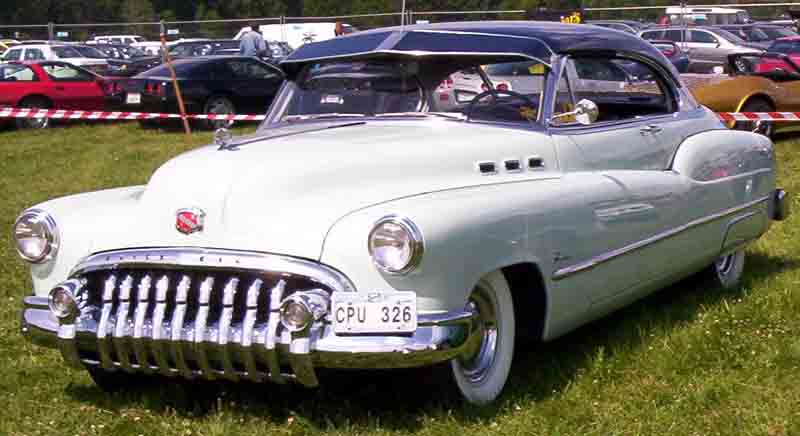
1950 Buick Super Riviera

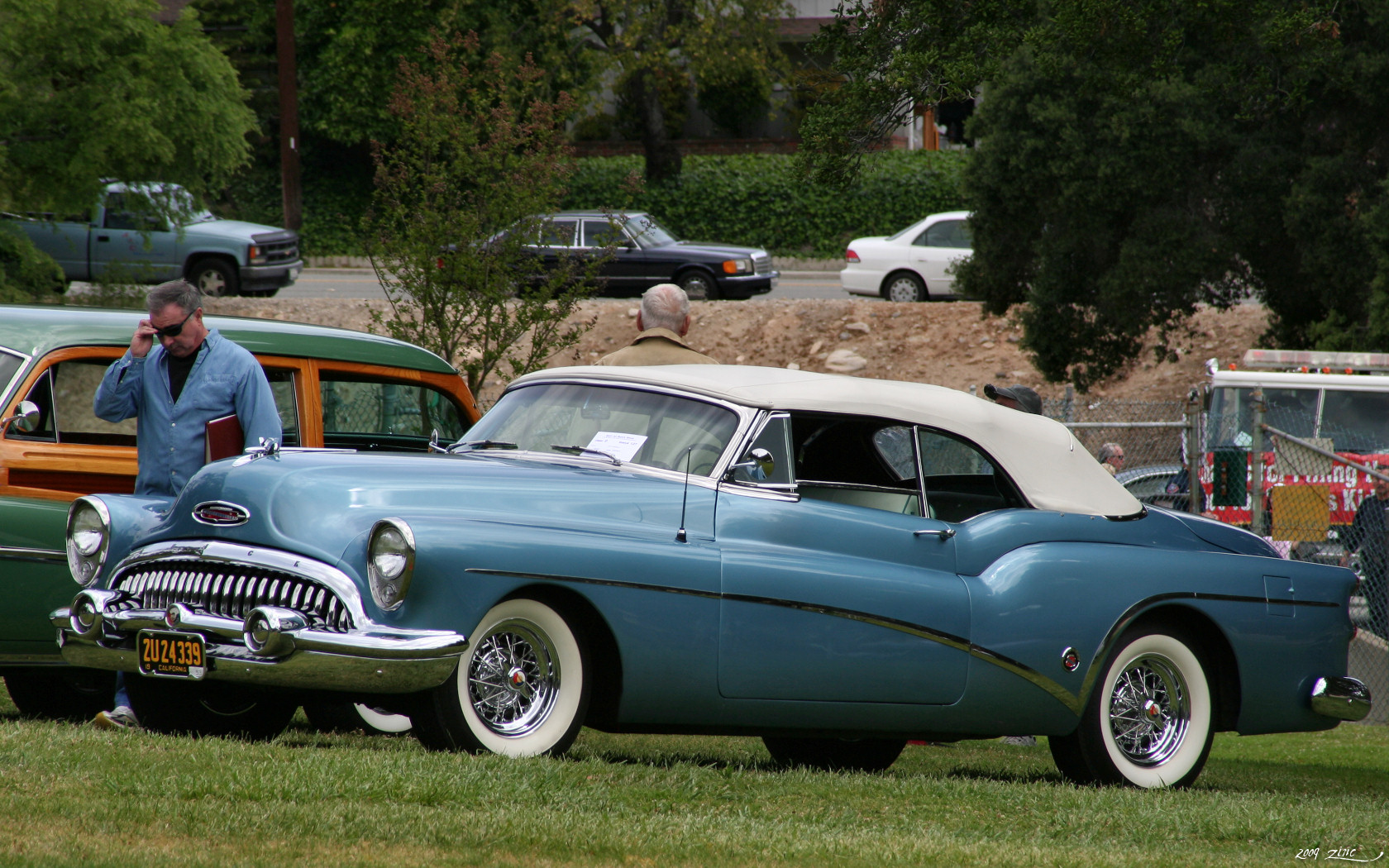
1953 Buick Roadmaster Skylark

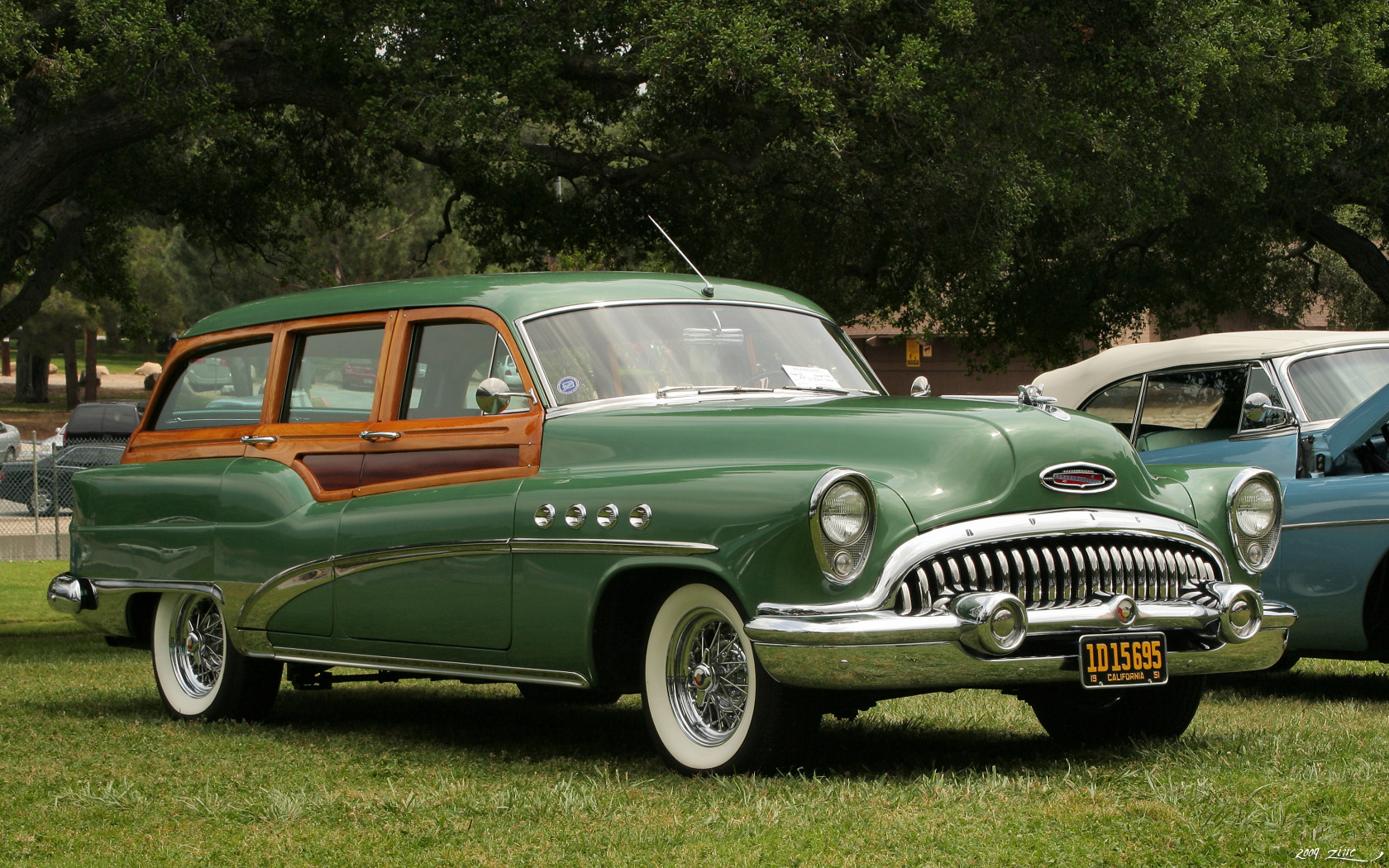
1953 Buick Roadmaster Estate

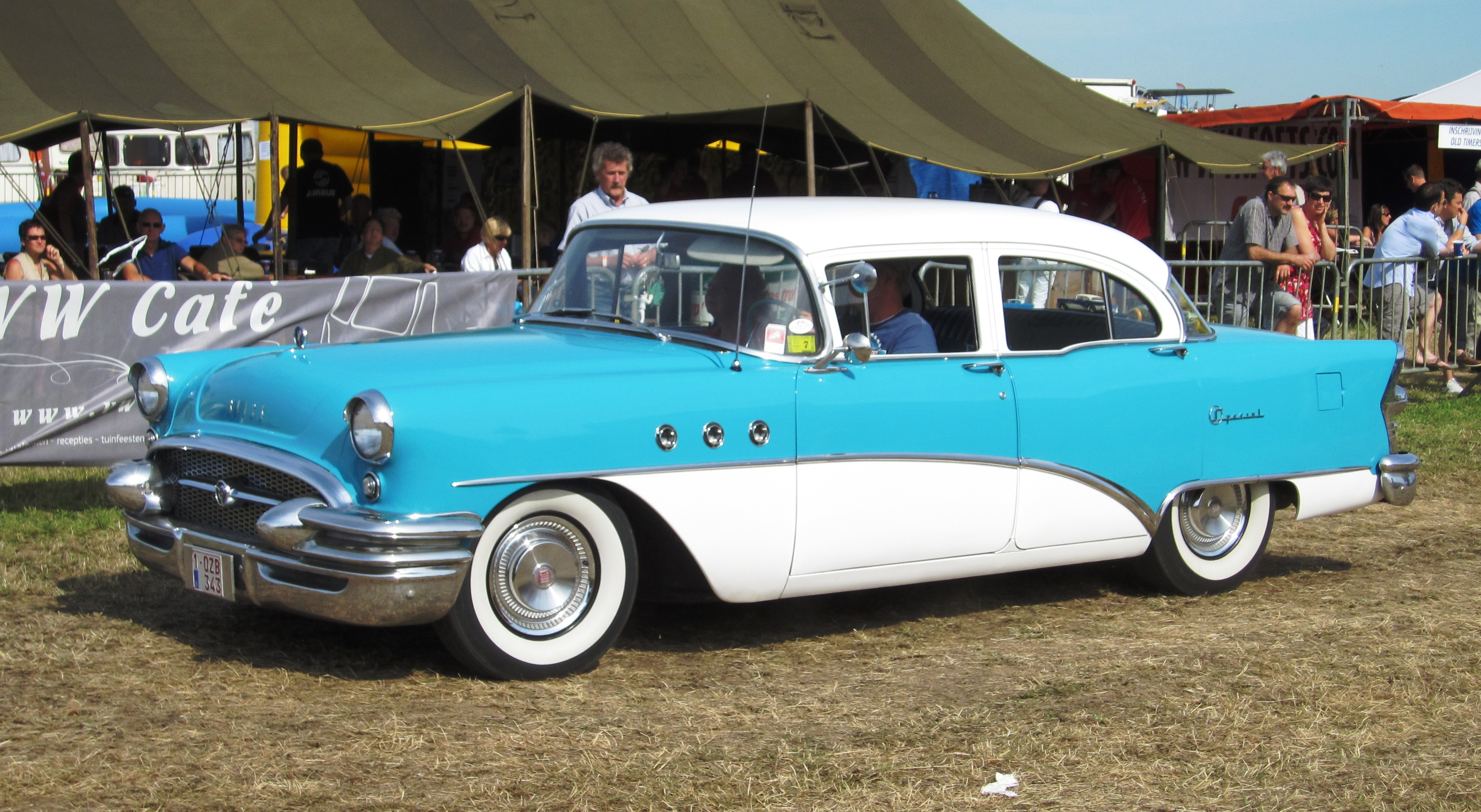
1955 Buick Special

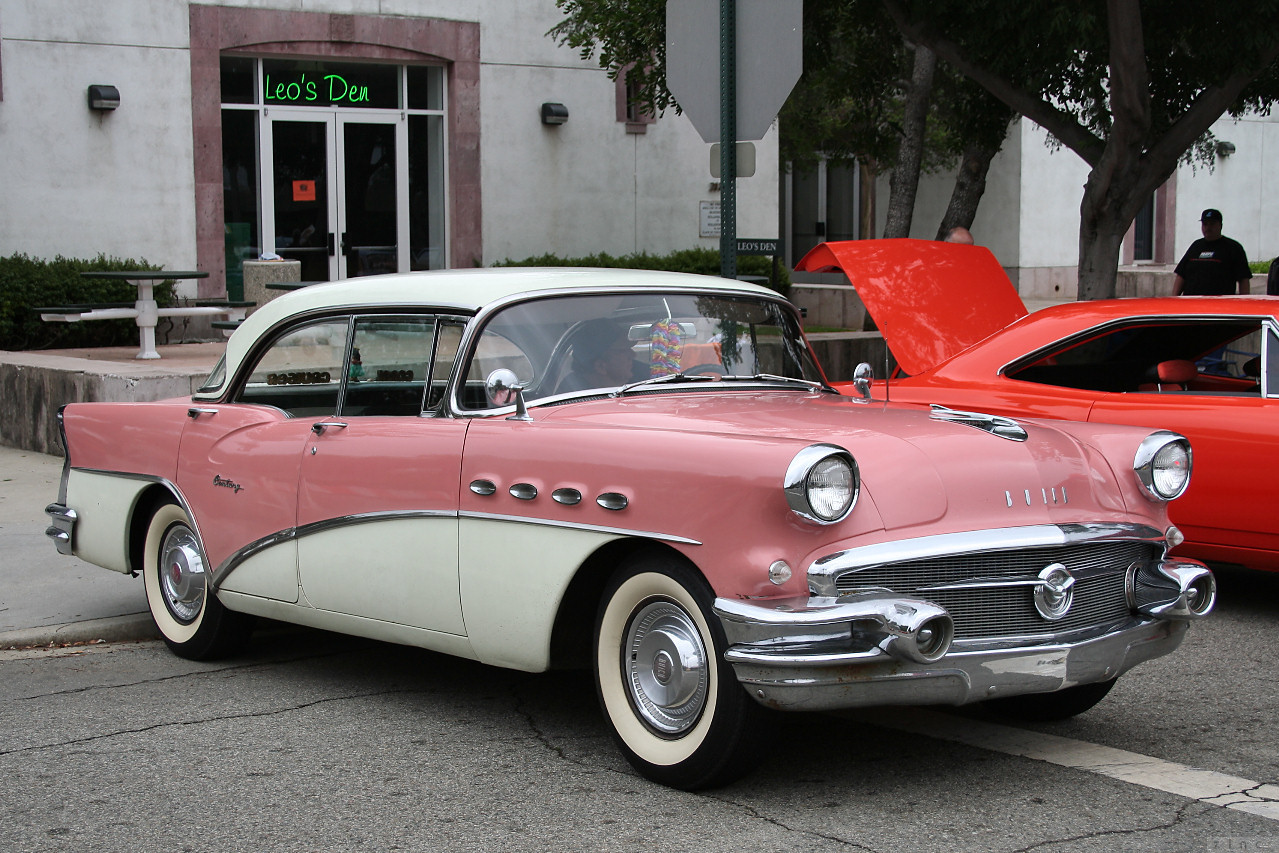
1956 Buick Century Riviera

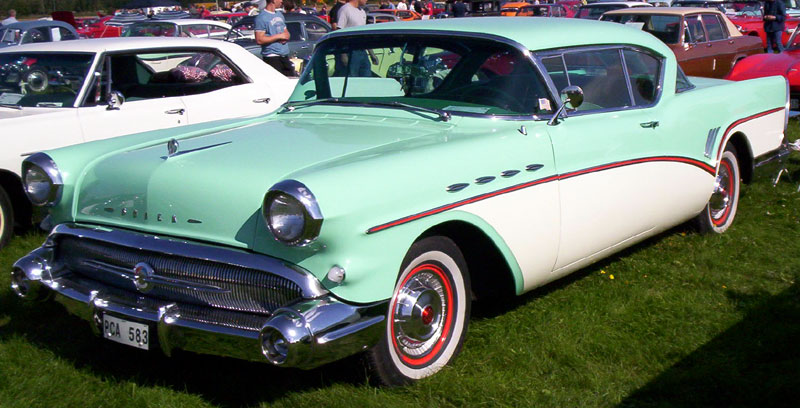
1957 Buick Super Riviera

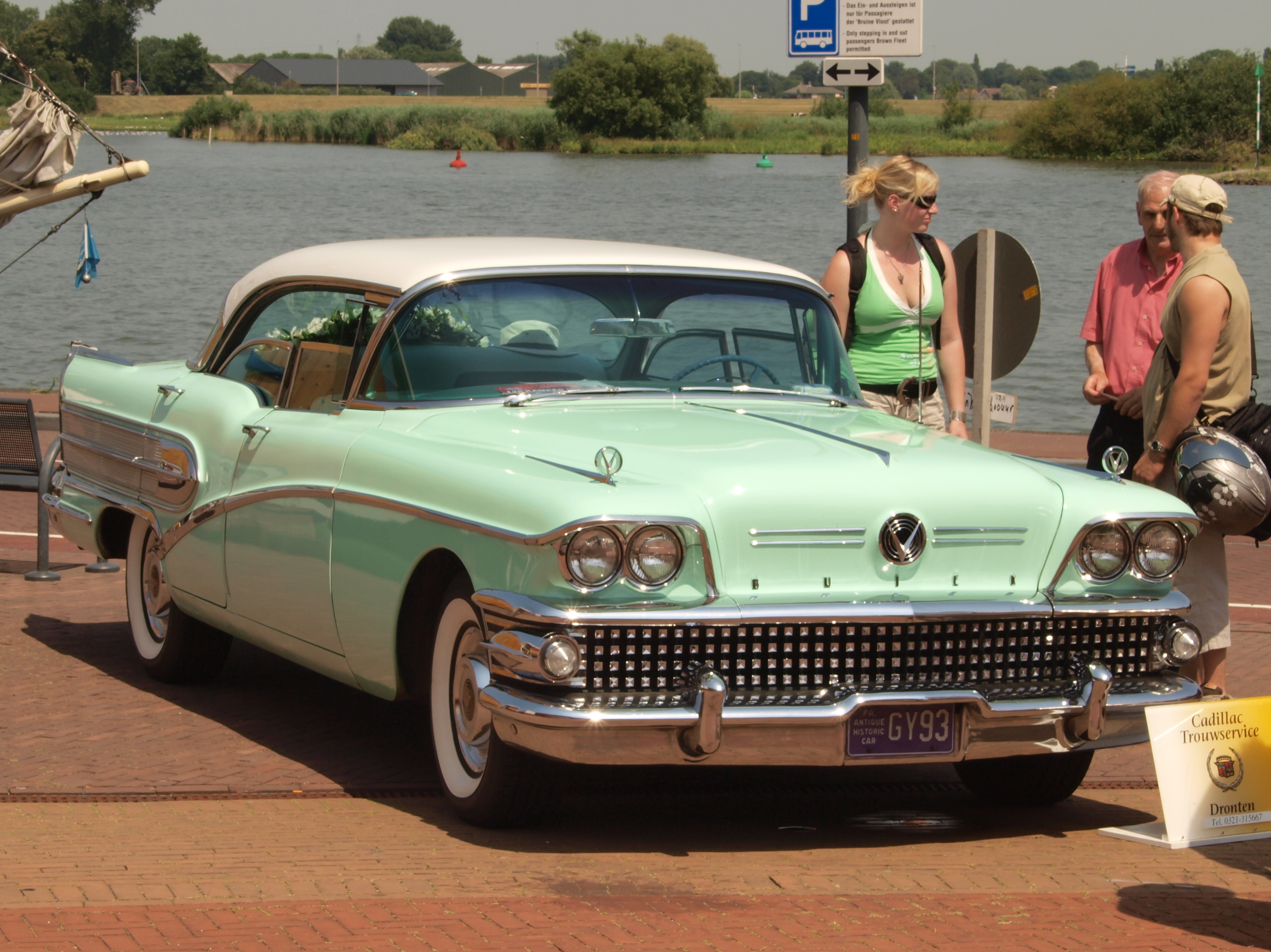
1958 Buick Special Riviera

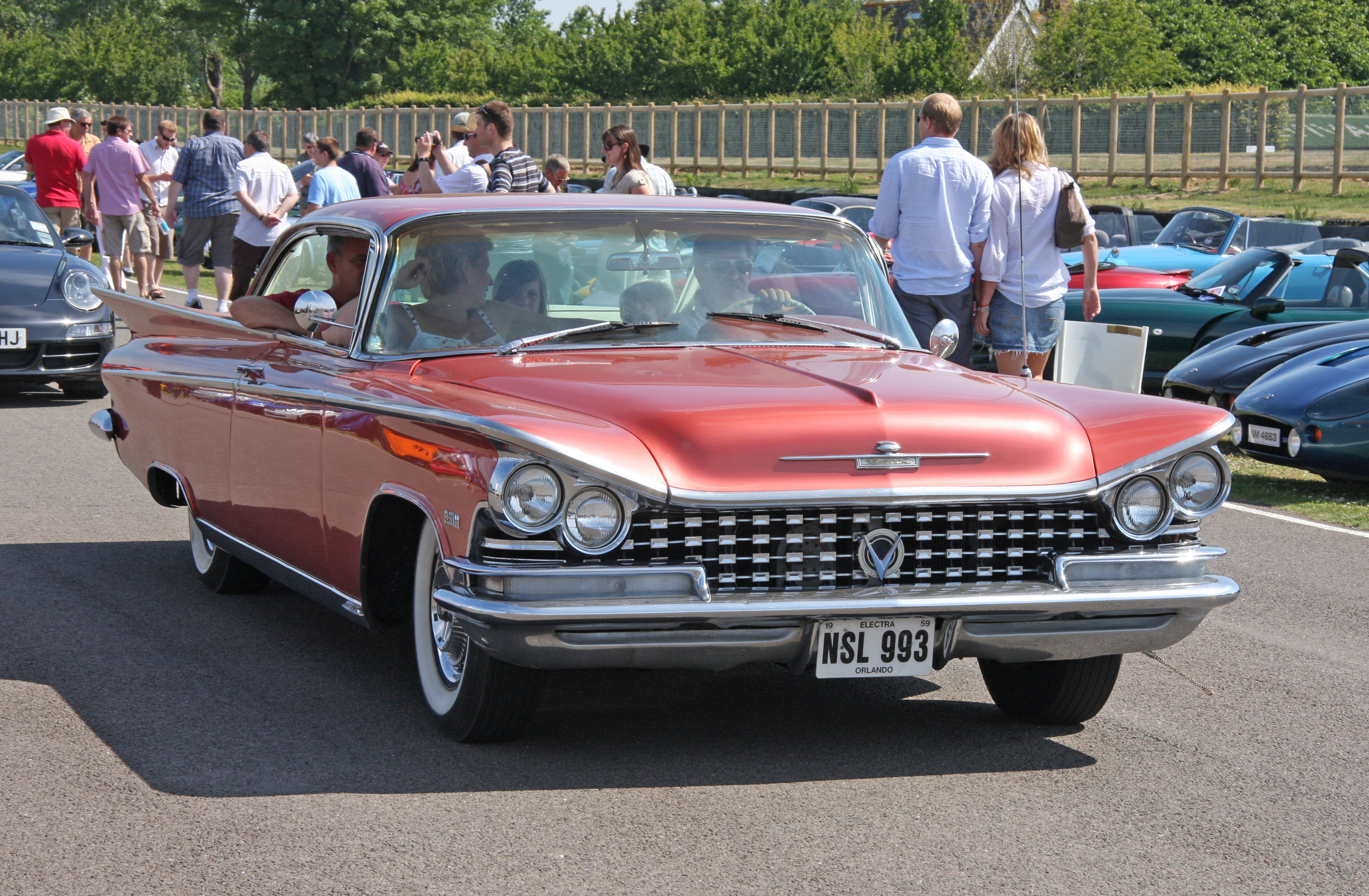
1959 Buick Electra

==== 1940s ====
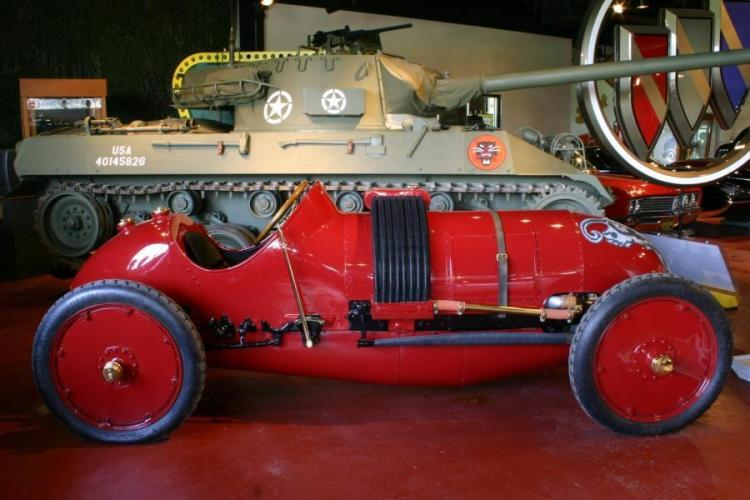
1910 Buick Bug race car and 1944 M18 Buick Hellcat tank destroyer

1940 saw the first use of the "Estate" designation for Buick on the Super station wagon. World War II stopped automobile production in 1942. Starting that year, Buick produced the M18 Hellcat tank destroyer and supplied radial engines for the B-24 Liberator, Douglas C-47 Skytrain, and Douglas C-54 Skymaster. By the fall of 1945, automobile production resumed. In 1948, the Dynaflow automatic transmission was first offered by Buick. 1949 saw the debut of Buick's VentiPorts.

==== 1950s ====
1953 marked Buick's 50th anniversary as well as the introductions of the Buick V8 engine and the Roadmaster Skylark. In 1955, Buick overtook Plymouth to become the third largest brand in vehicles sold, its best postwar result, and retained the spot for 1956, it also had its best model year sales to date with 738,814 vehicles sold; a record that would hold until 1977. In 1957, Buick's new 364 cu. in. engine block and ball joint front suspension debuted and Roadmasters now had aluminum finned brake drums. However, with the economic cooldown, in 1957 Buick fell to fourth place again. 1959 saw the introduction of three new models: Electra, Invicta and LeSabre as well as a new 401 cu. in. V8 engine in the Electra and Invicta. An Electra also paced the Indianapolis 500 race that year.

1960s–1970s

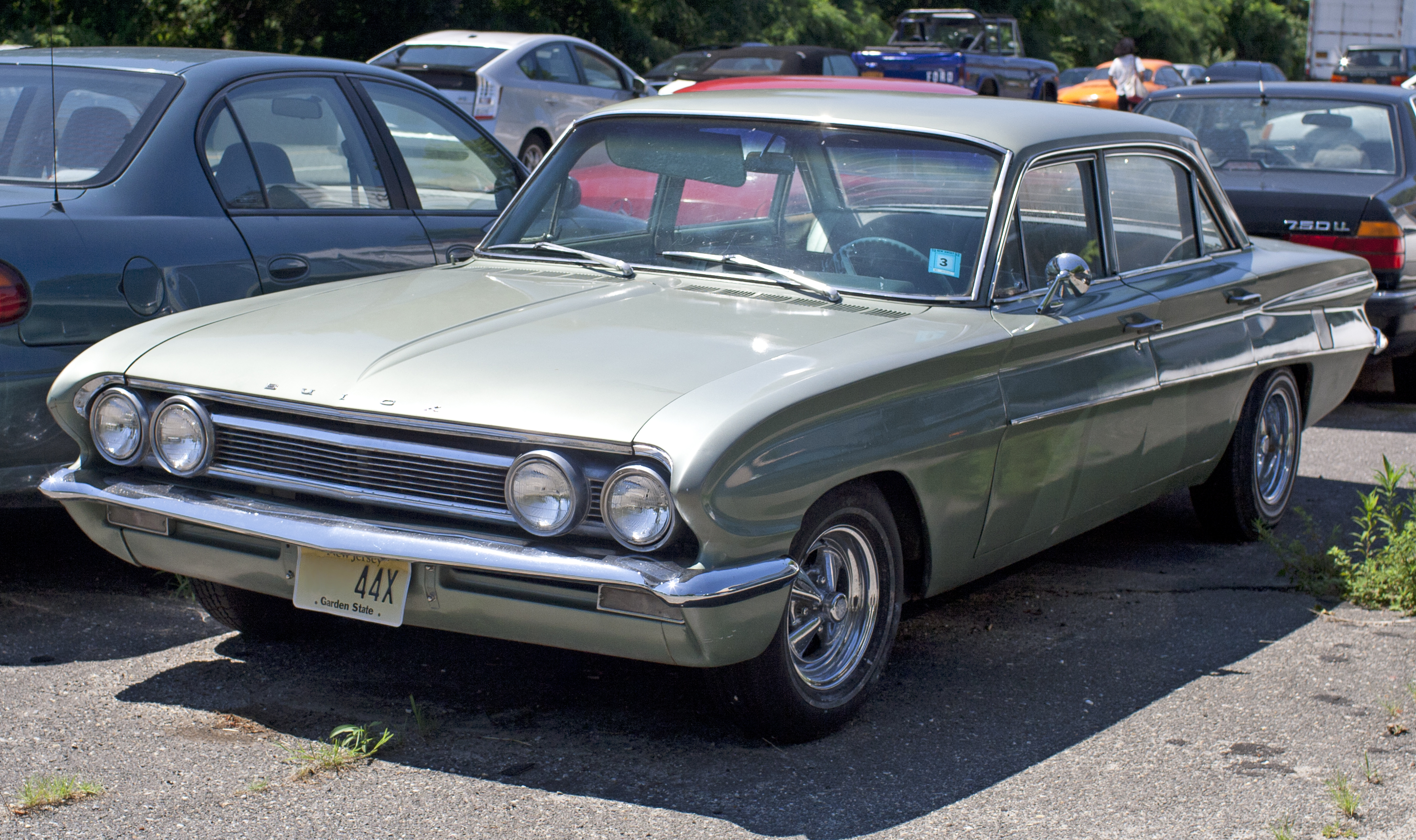
1962 Buick Special DeLuxe

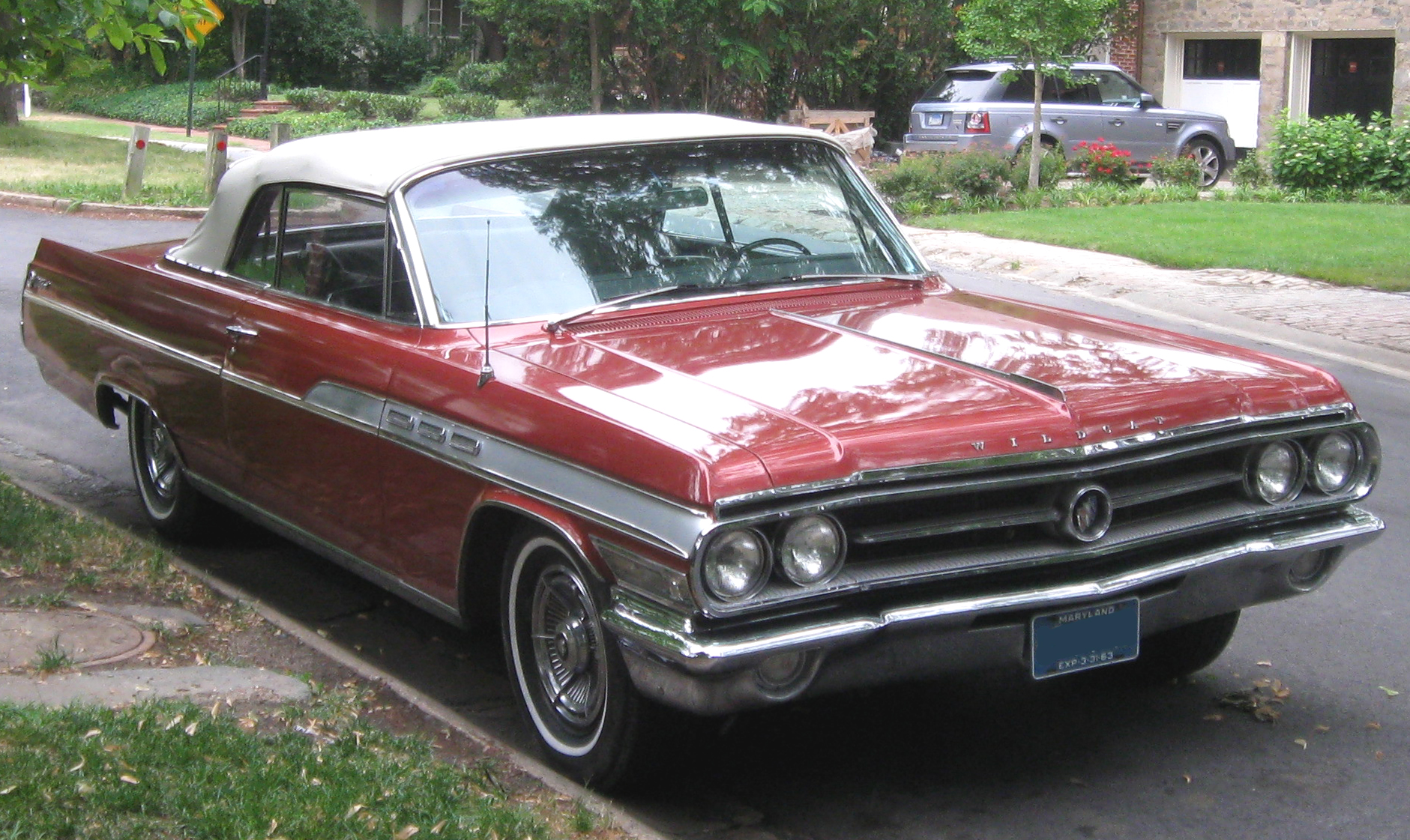
1963 Buick Wildcat

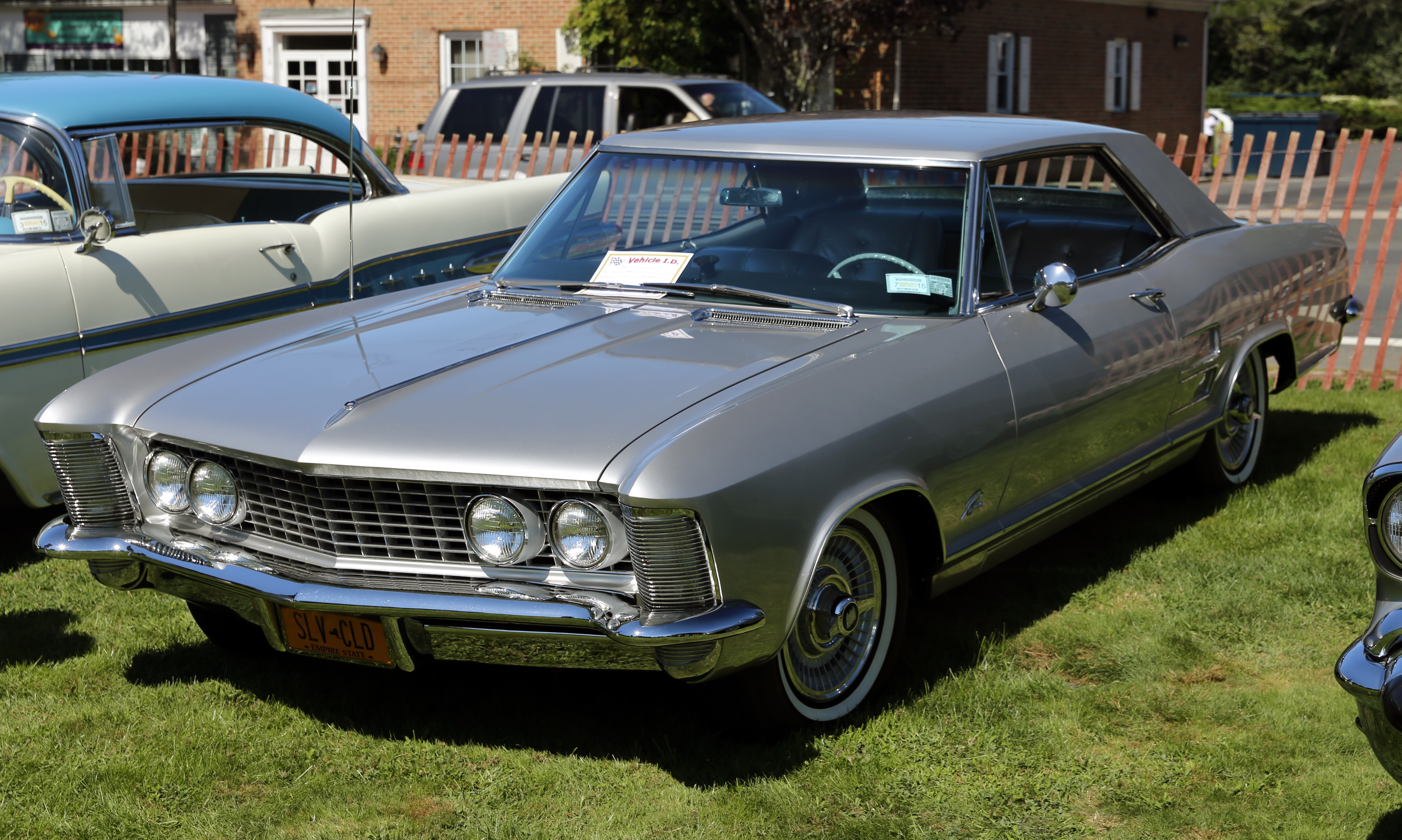
1963 Buick Riviera

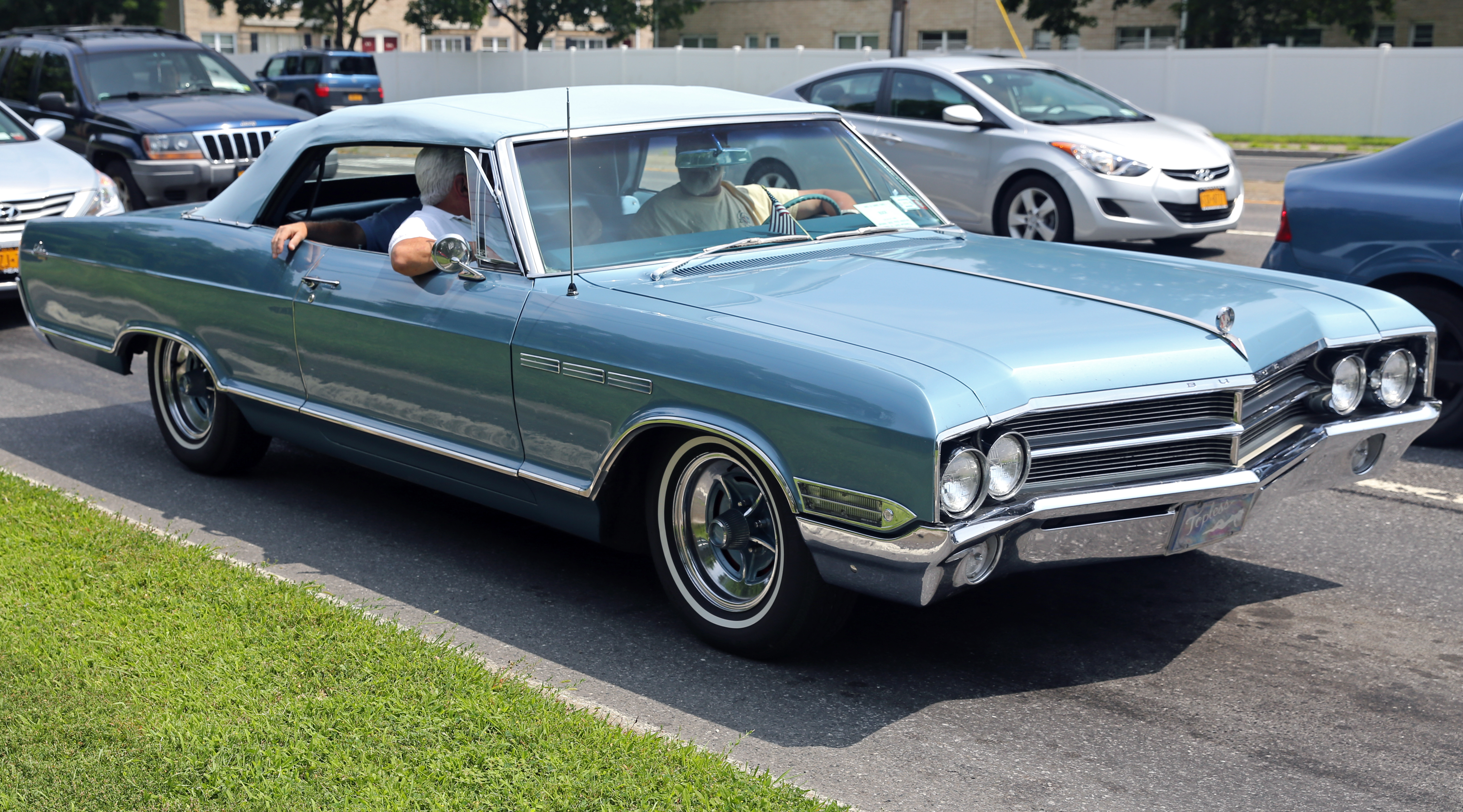
1965 Buick LeSabre

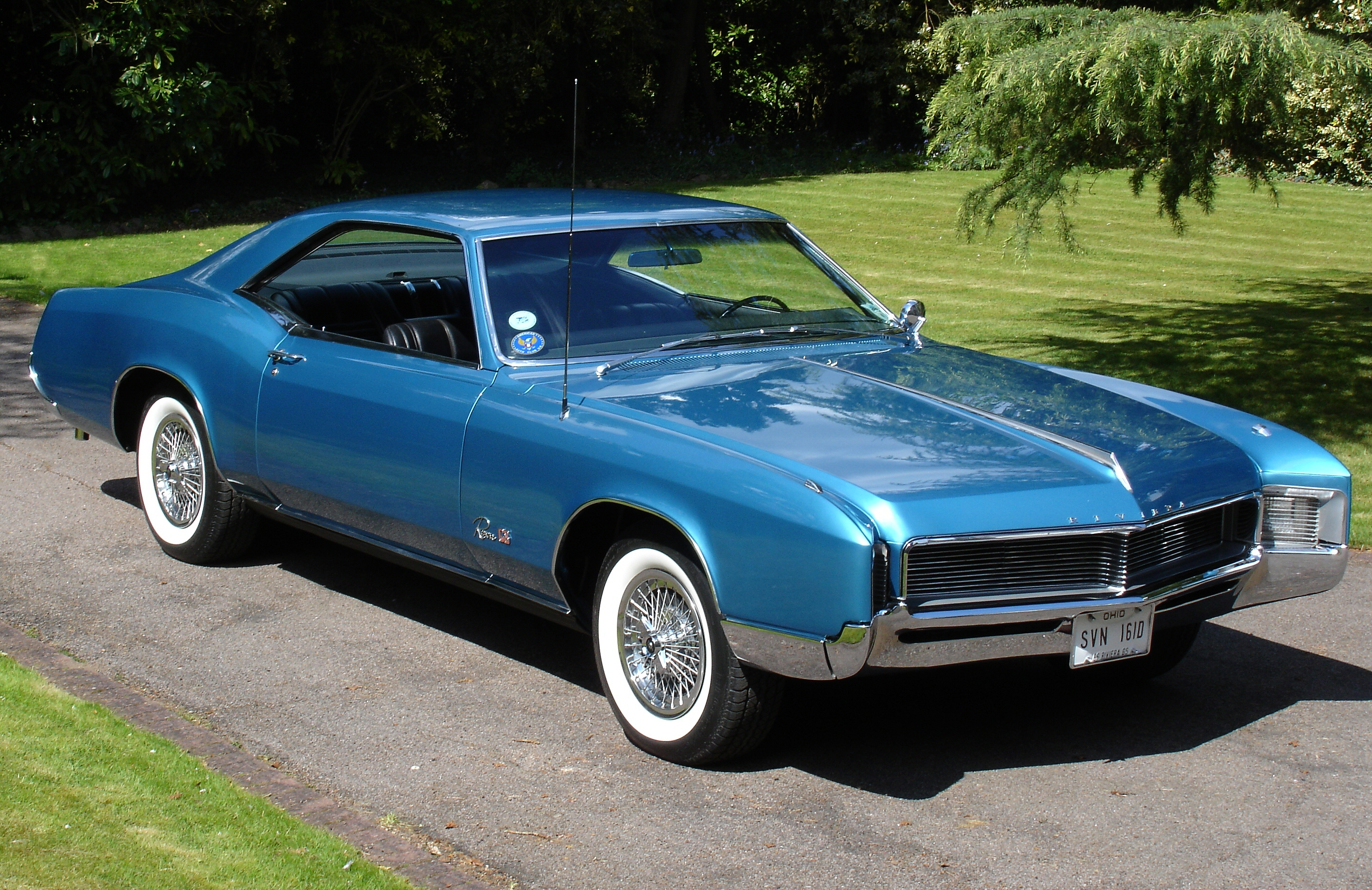
1966 Buick Riviera GS

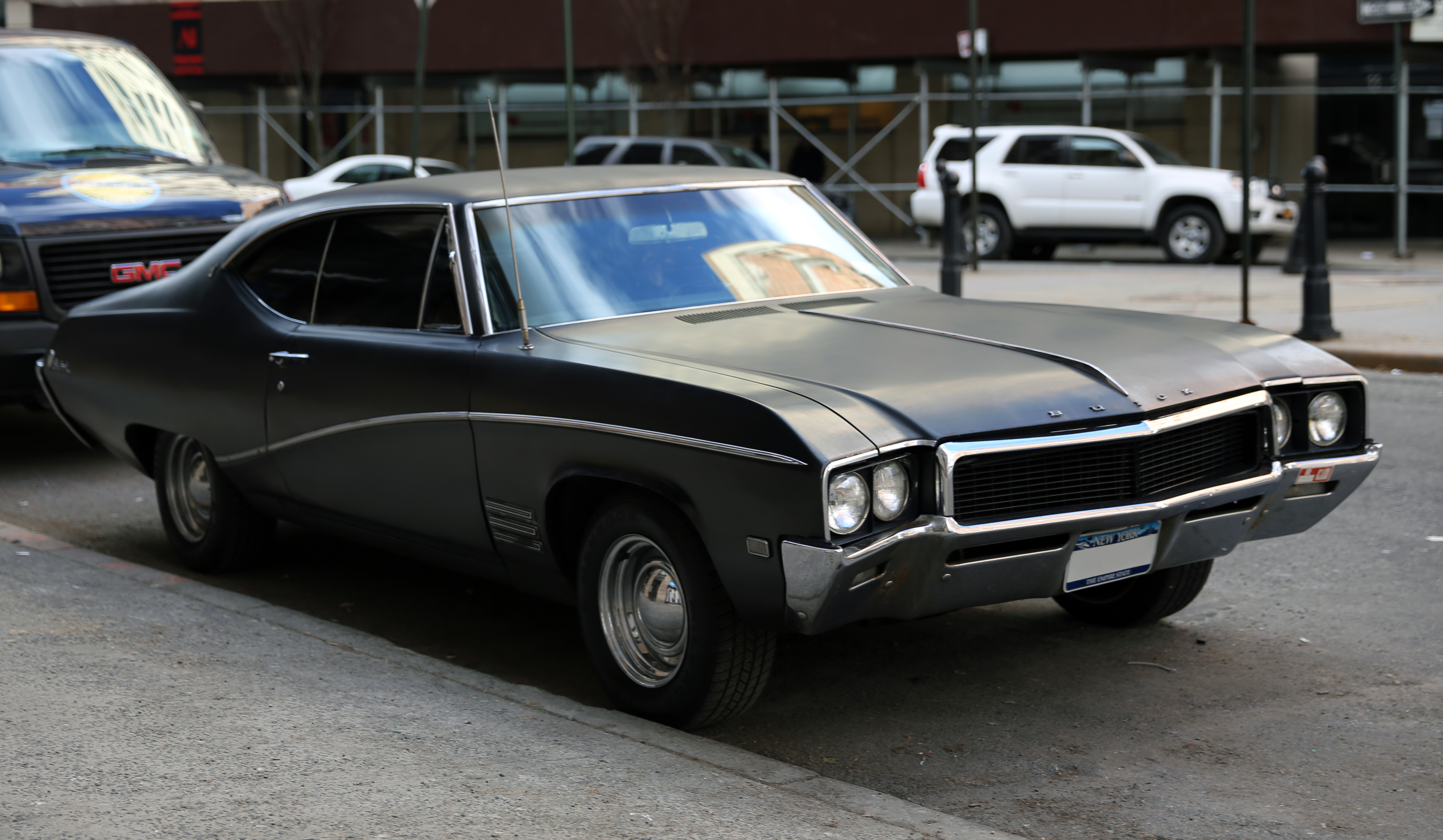
1968 Buick Skylark

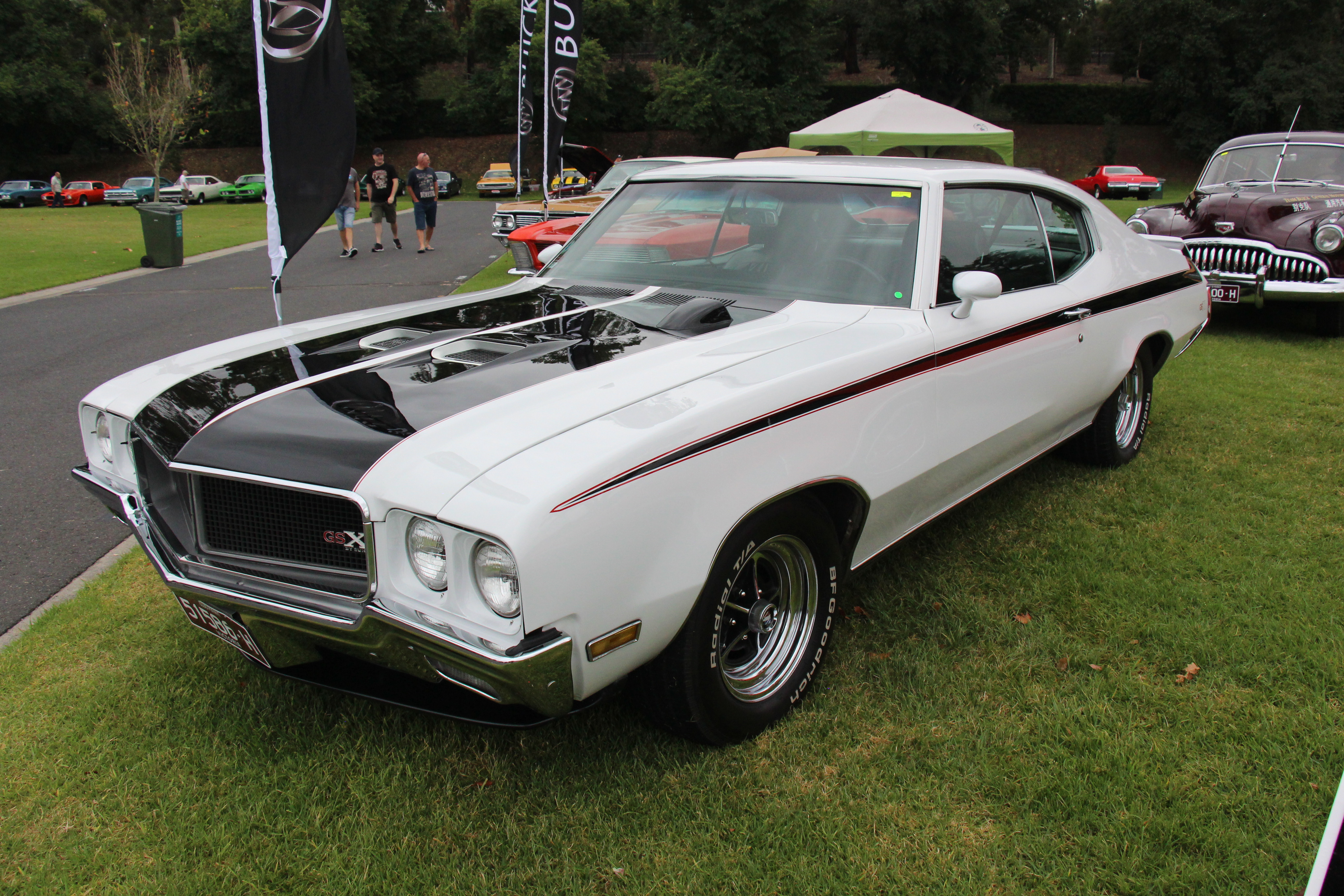
1970 Buick GSX

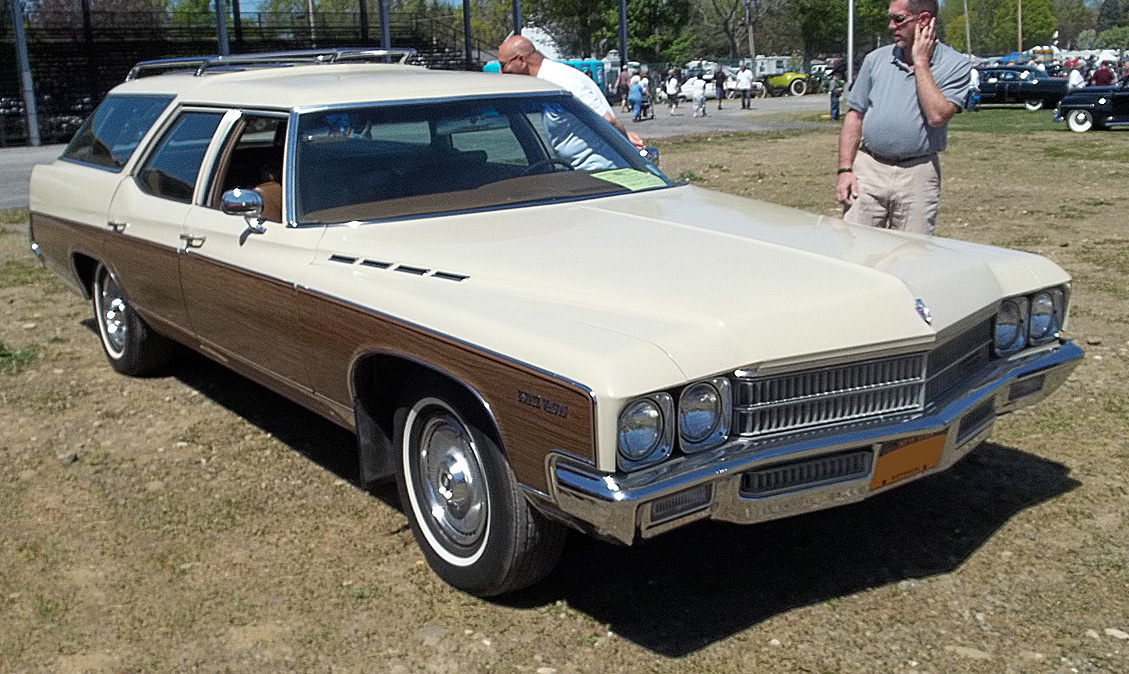
1971 Buick Estate

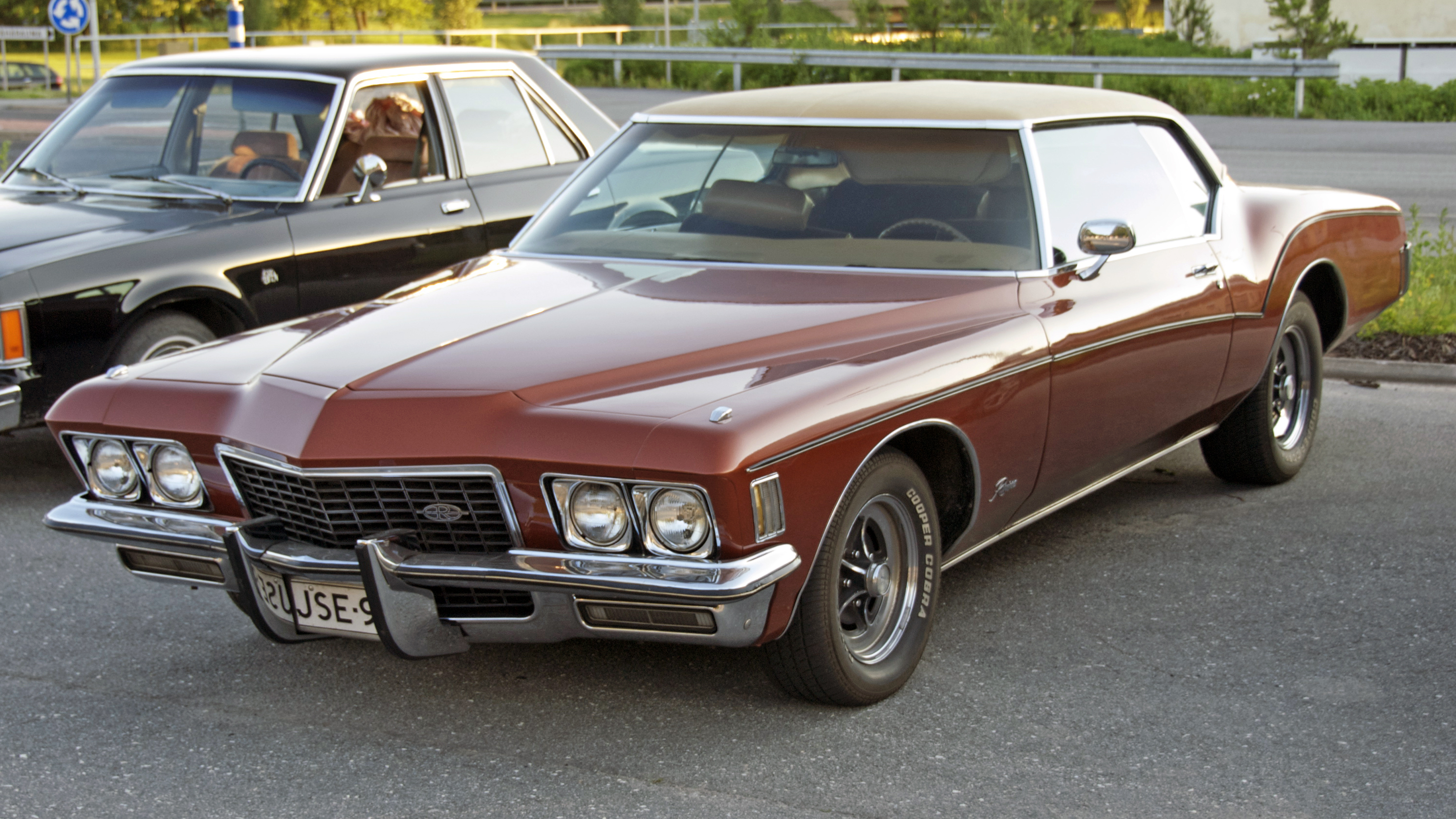
1972 Buick Riviera

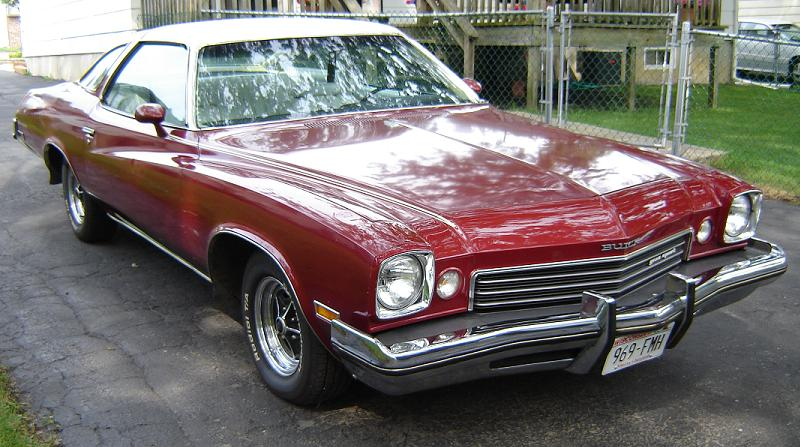
1973 Buick Century GS

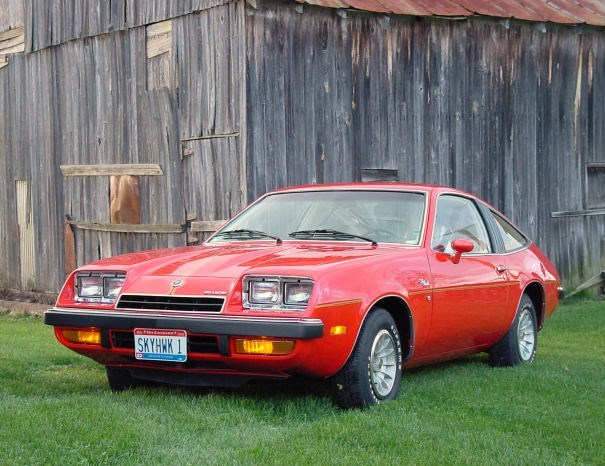
1975 Buick Skyhawk

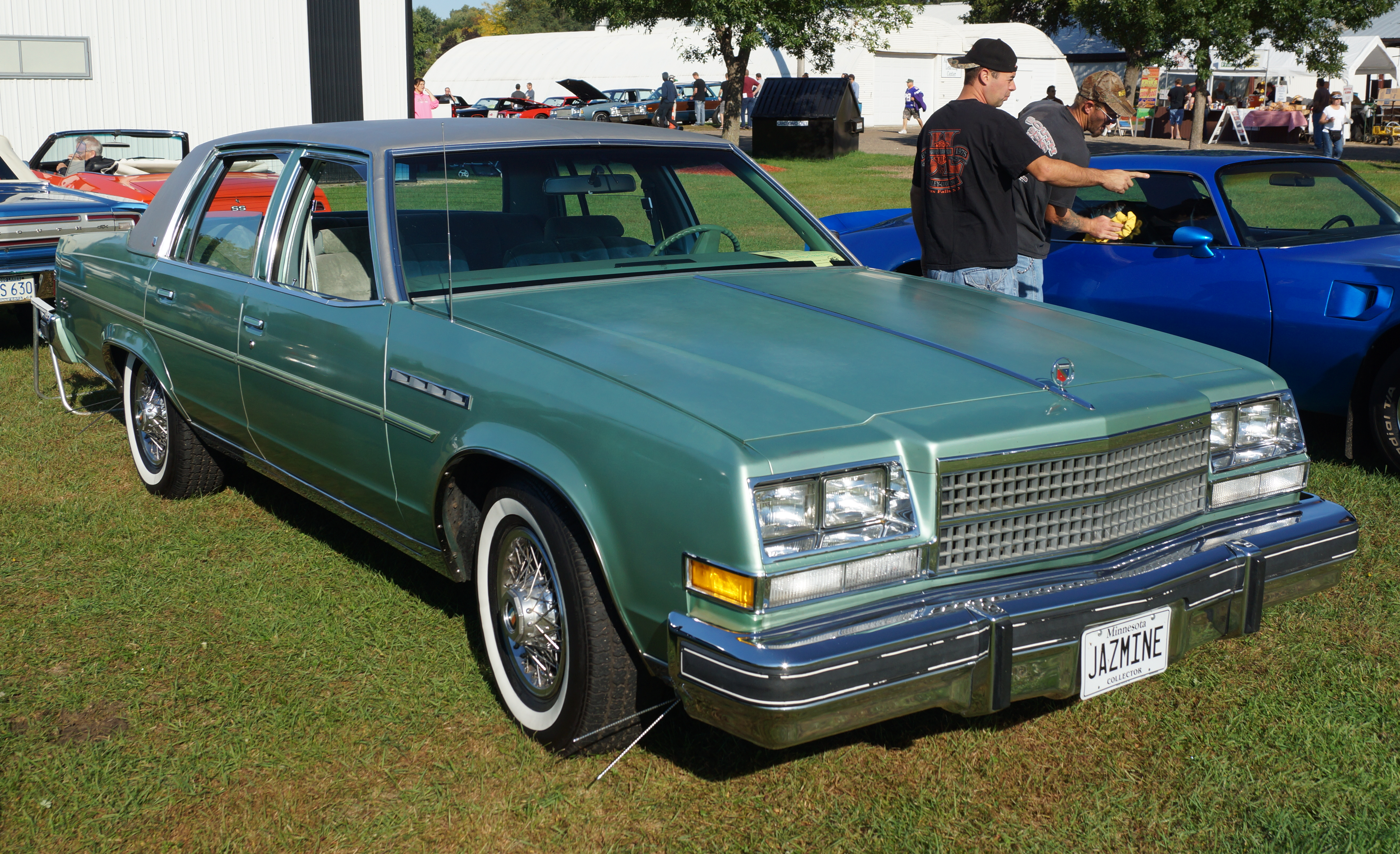
1978 Buick Electra Limited

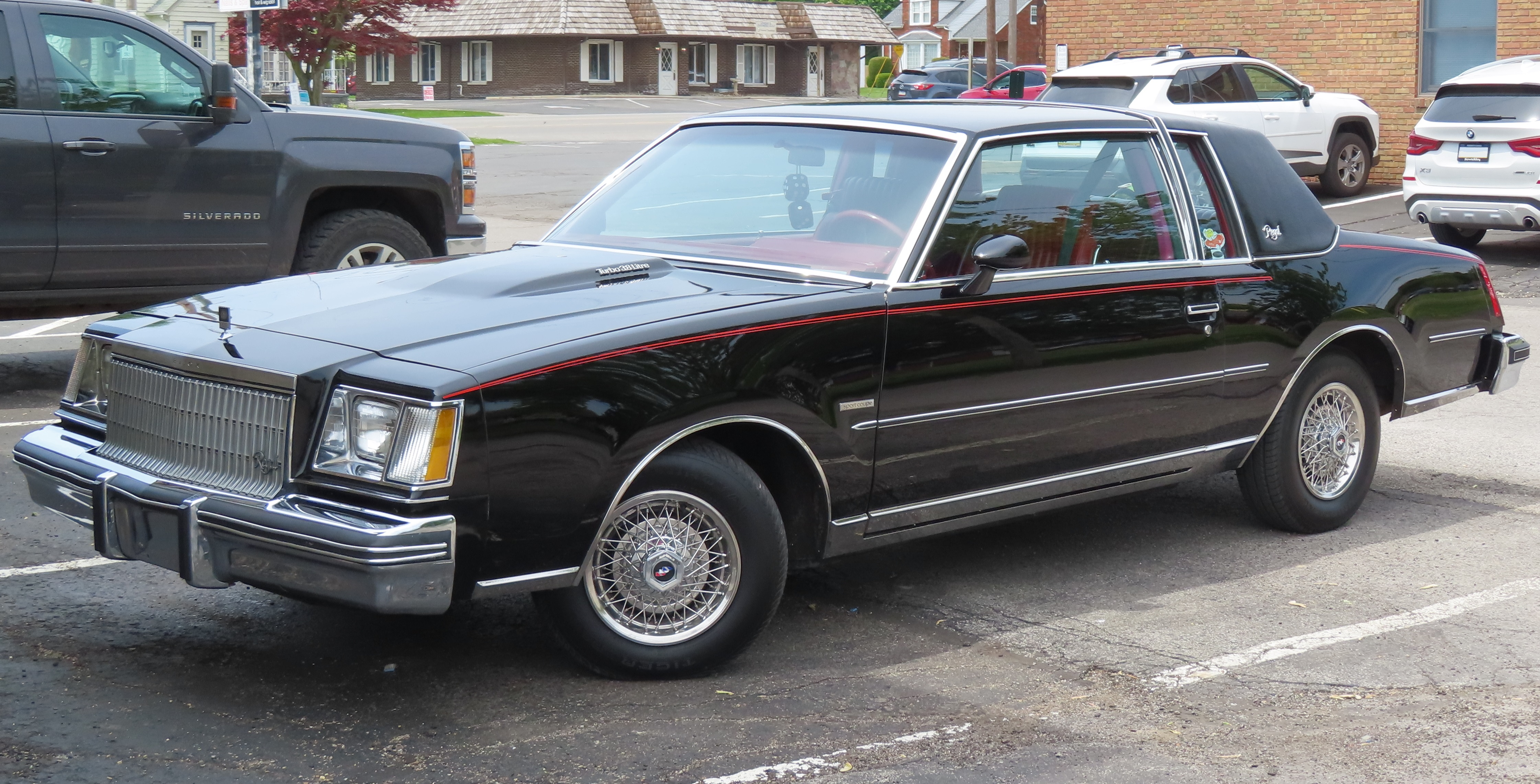
1979 Buick Regal

==== 1960s ====
An Electra 225 paced the Daytona 500 race in both 1960 and 1963. In 1961, a new Fireball V6 engine was introduced and the Skylark nameplate returned as the top model of the new Special compact car line. The Buick Special was named Motor Trend Car of the Year in 1962. Also in 1962, Wildcat was introduced as a trim level on Invicta and became its own model the following year. In 1963 the Riviera was introduced as its own model. In the mid-1960s Buick started officially selling German-built Opel cars through its North American dealerships. For 1967, radial tires became available as an option on all full-size Buicks.

==== 1970s ====
The 1970s saw a number of new models added to the Buick lineup including the Estate Wagon as its own model in 1970, Centurion in 1971, Apollo in 1973, and Skyhawk in 1975. 1975 also saw the first appearance of the "Park Avenue" nameplate for Buick as a trim/option package on the Electra 225 Limited. A Buick Century paced the Indianapolis 500 race not once but twice in the mid-1970s. In 1976, Buick began selling rebadged Isuzu Geminis as Opels to replace the Opel Kadett models it had previously marketed. The following year, Electra 225 and LeSabre were redesigned and downsized, and the Buick brand saw its best model year sales to date with 773,313 vehicles sold. 1978 marked Buick's 75th anniversary and welcomed a redesigned Century as well as a redesigned Regal coupe which was now available with a turbocharged V6 engine. Buick model year sales broke another record in 1978 with 795,316 vehicles sold. In 1979, the Riviera was redesigned; Riviera S-Type was named Motor Trend Car of the Year.

1980s–1990s

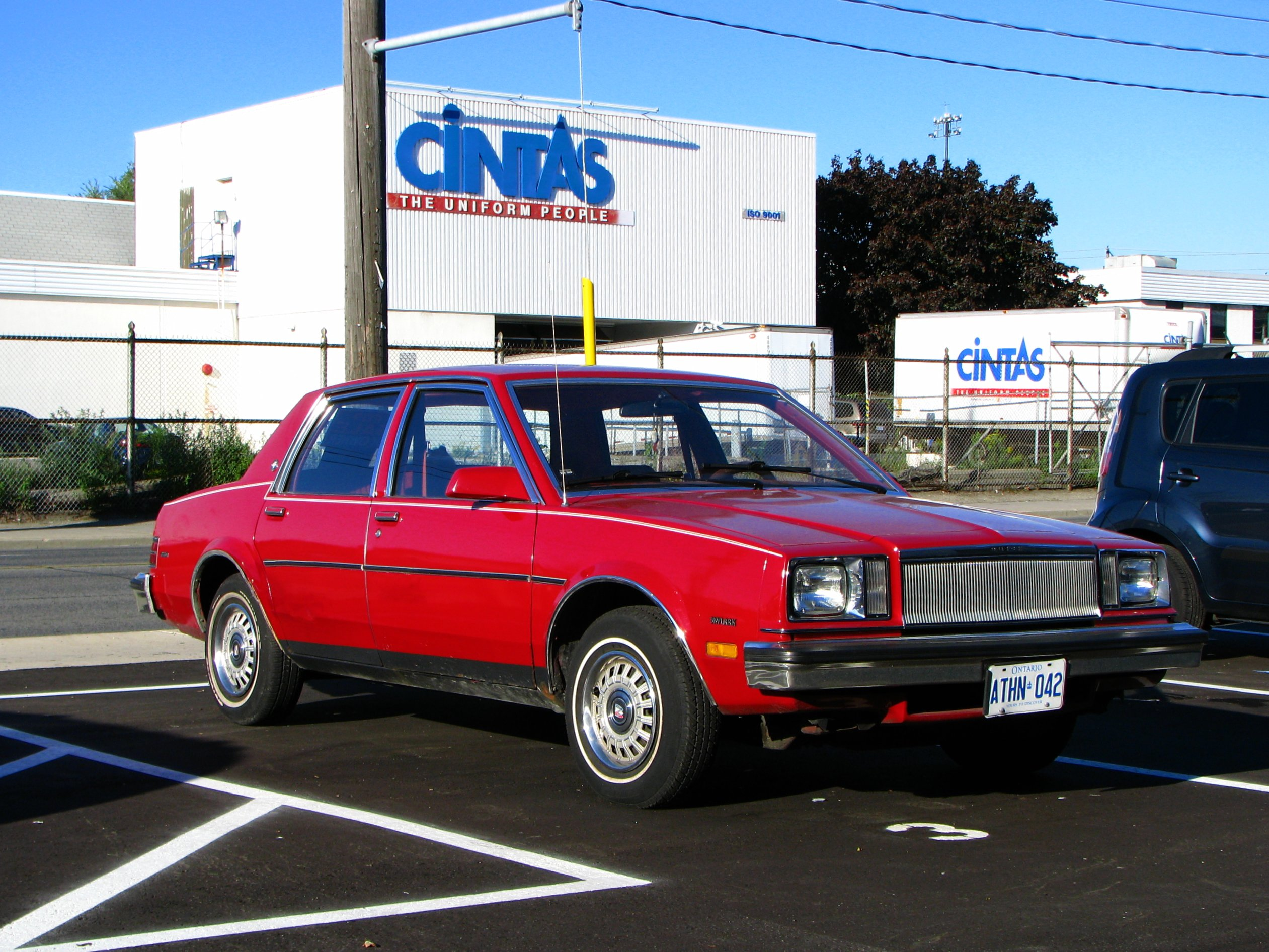
1980 Buick Skylark

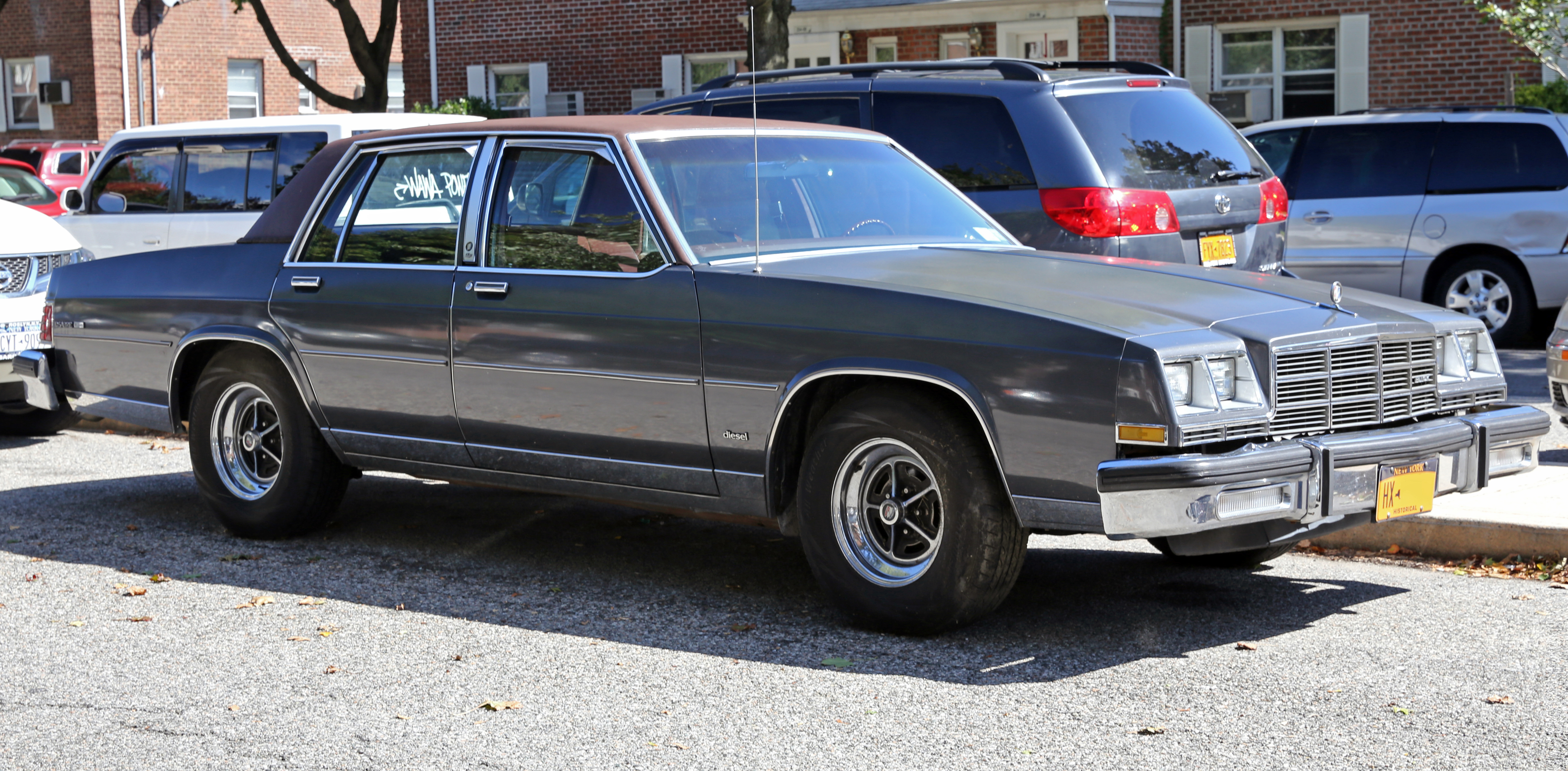
1982 Buick LeSabre Limited

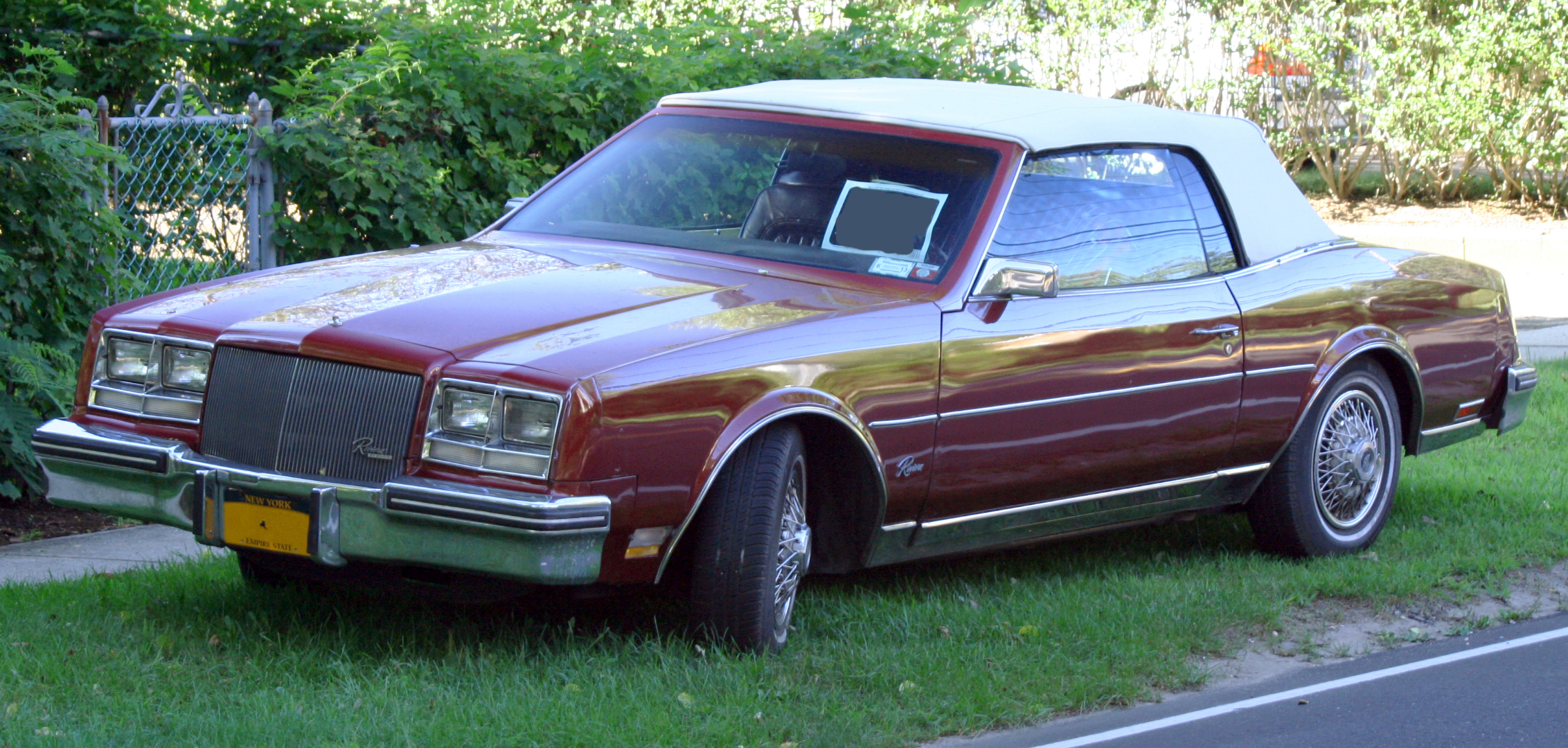
1984 Buick Riviera

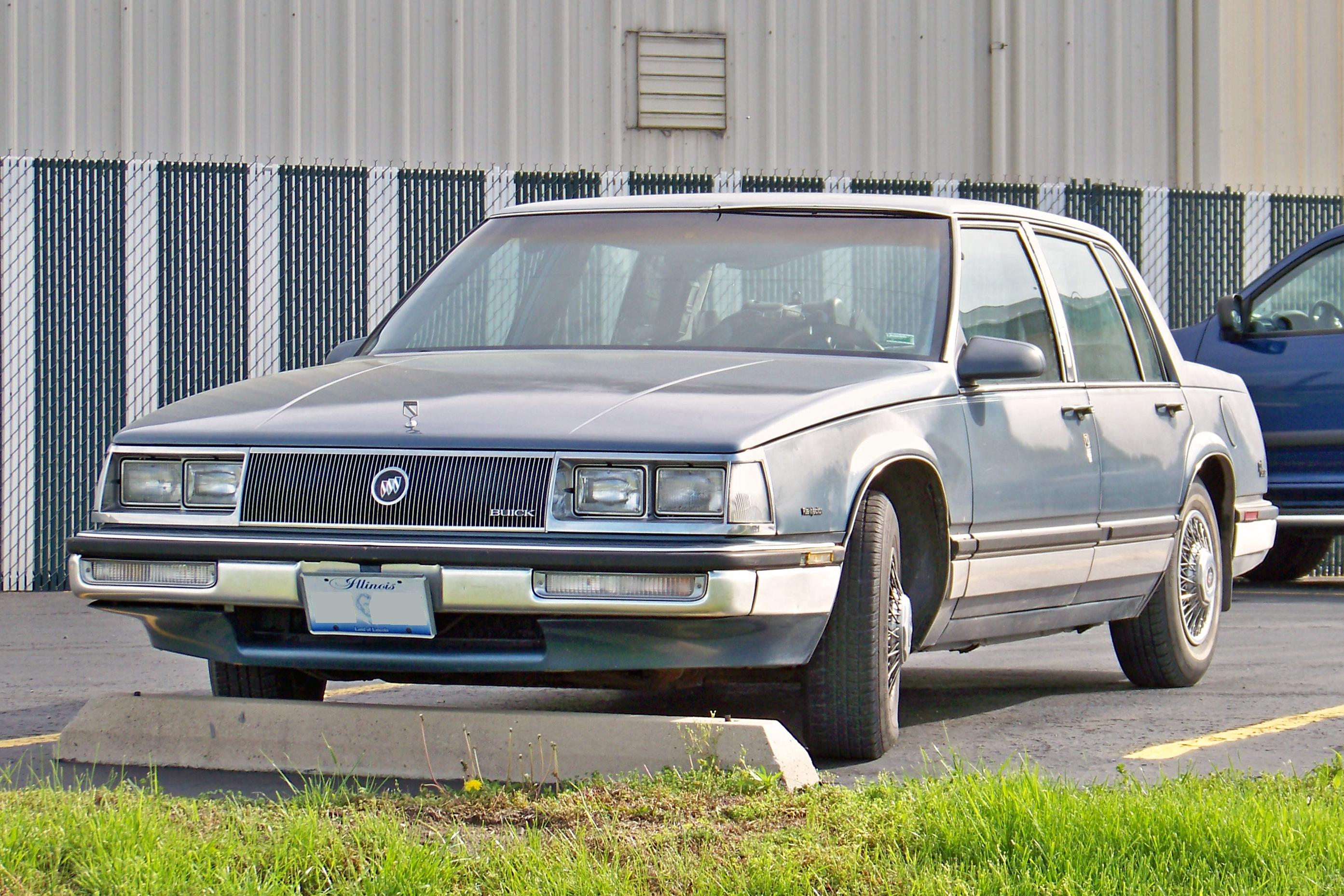
1985 Buick Electra Park Avenue

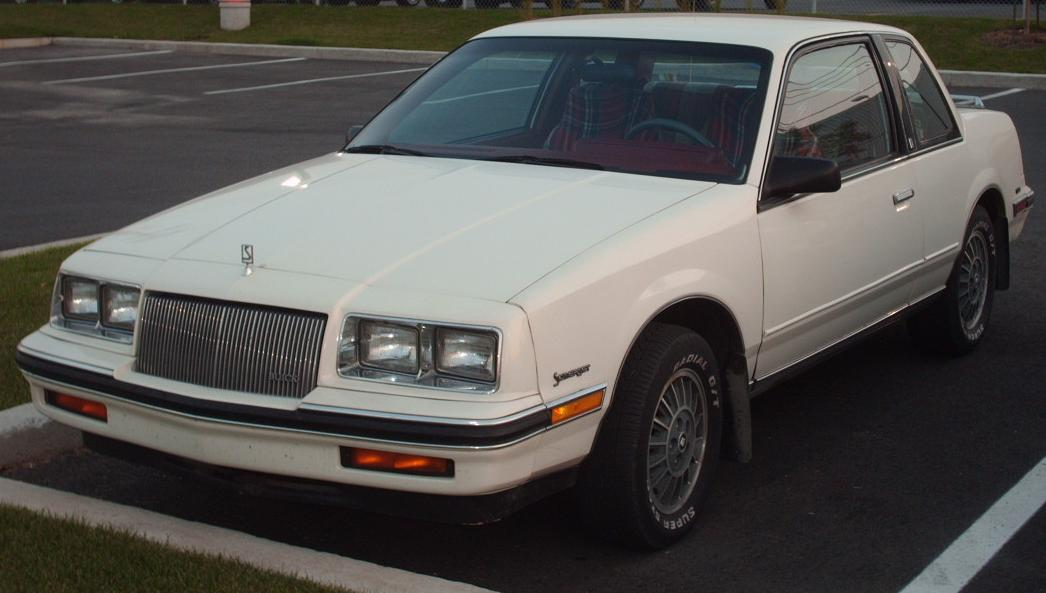
1986 Buick Somerset

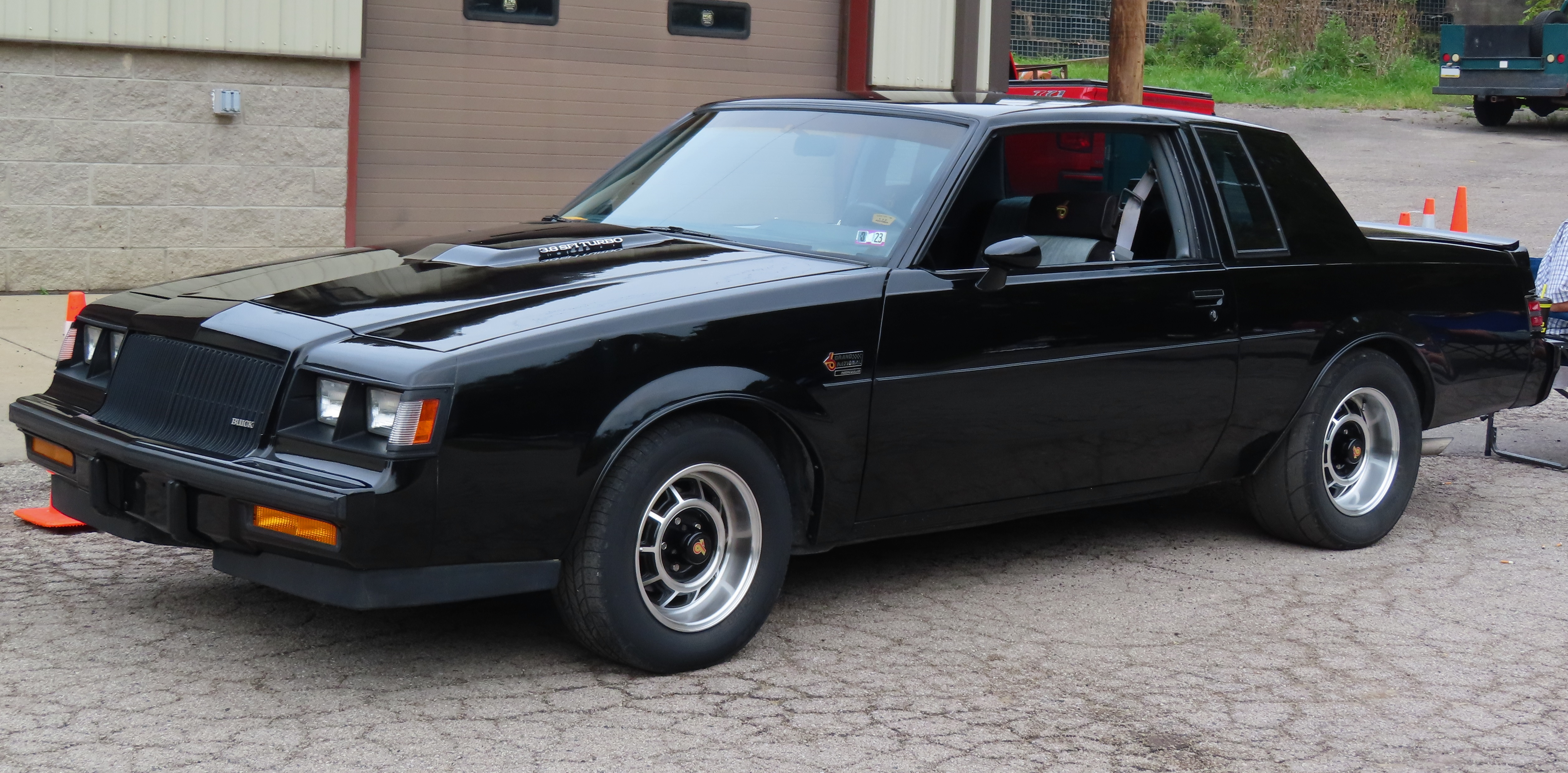
1987 Buick Regal Grand National

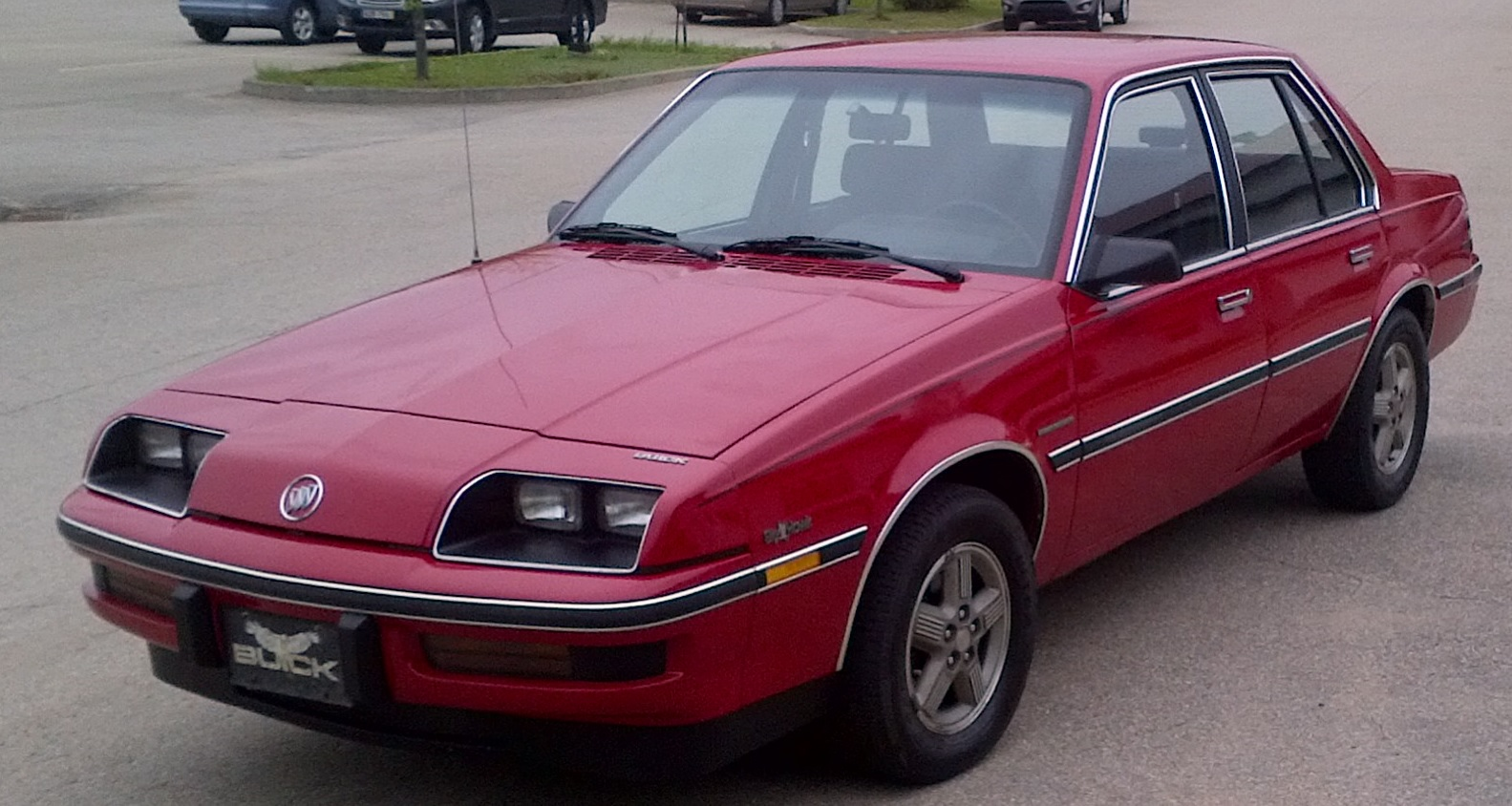
1987 Buick Skyhawk Custom

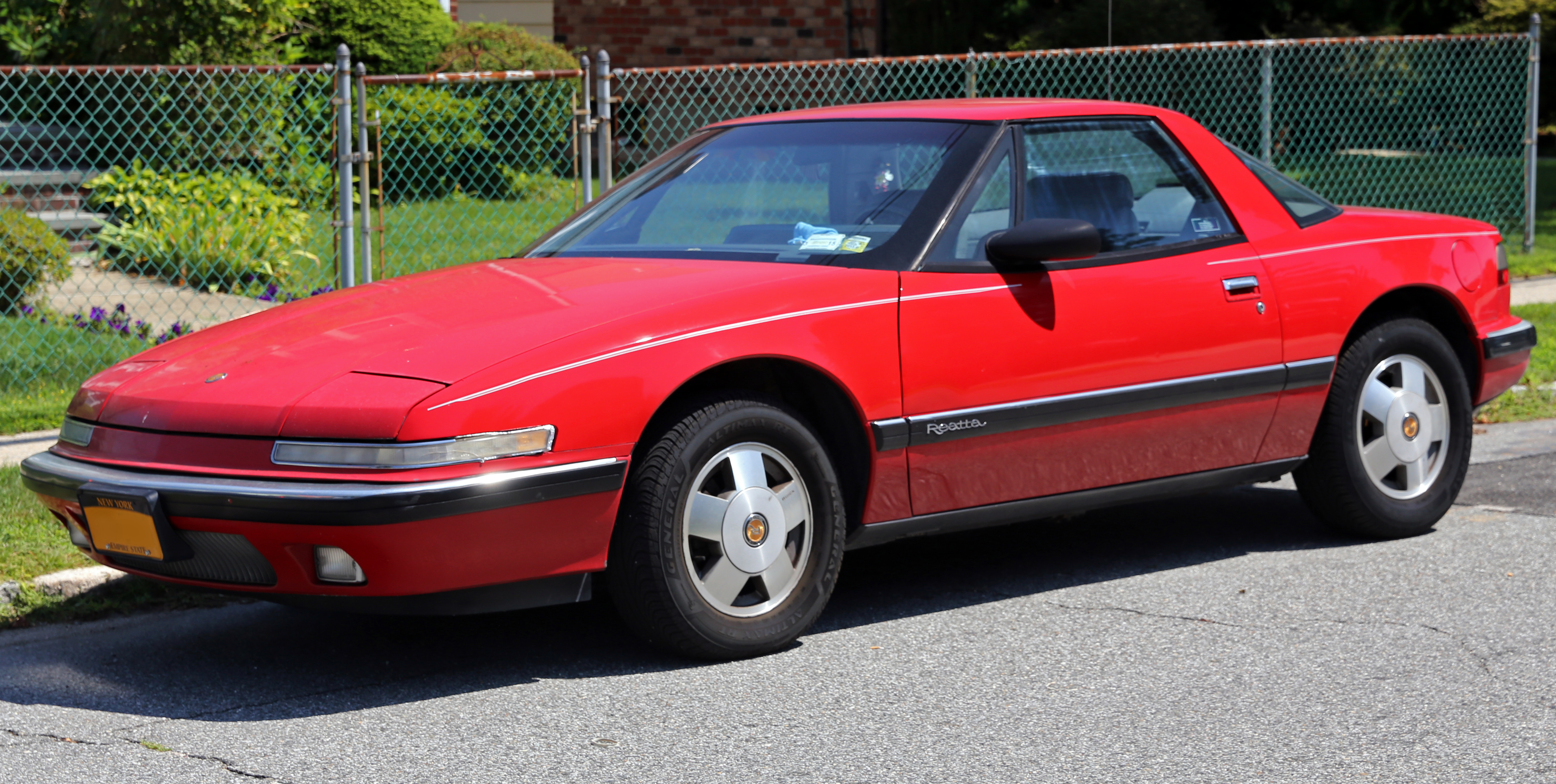
1988 Buick Reatta

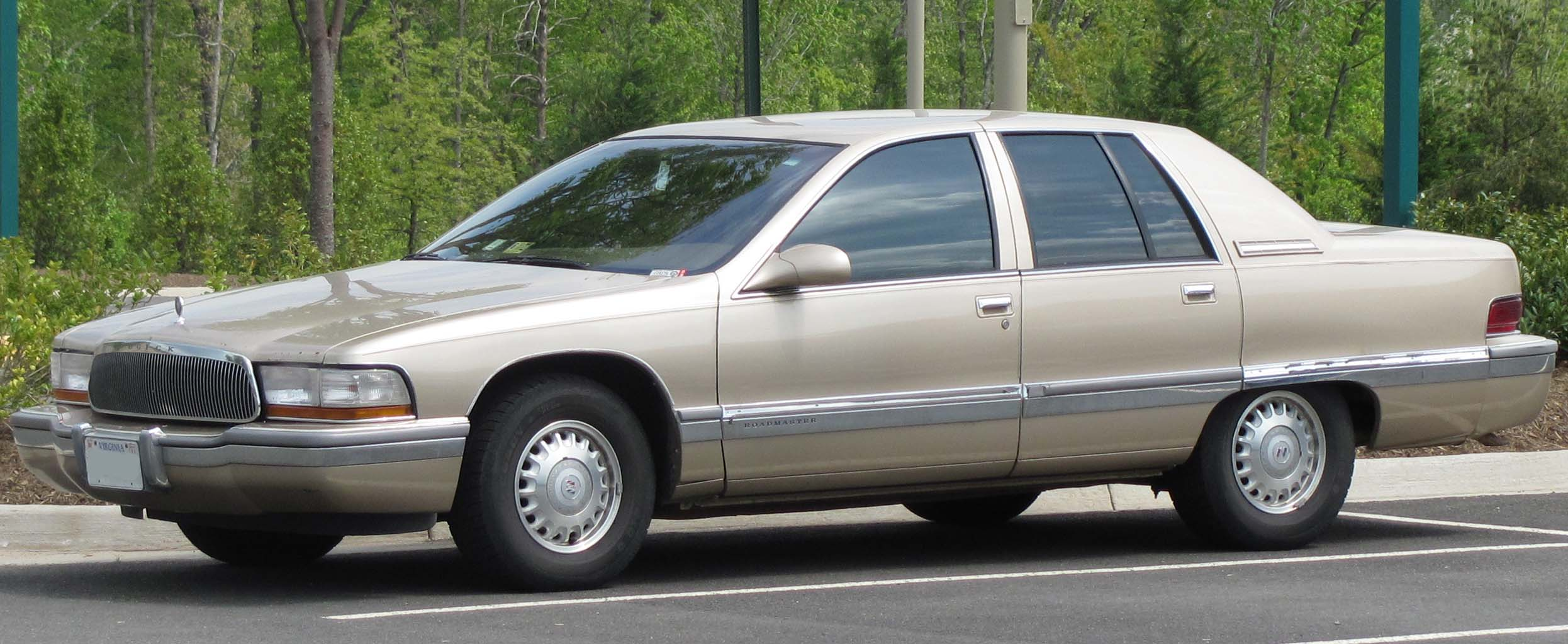
1992 Buick Roadmaster Limited

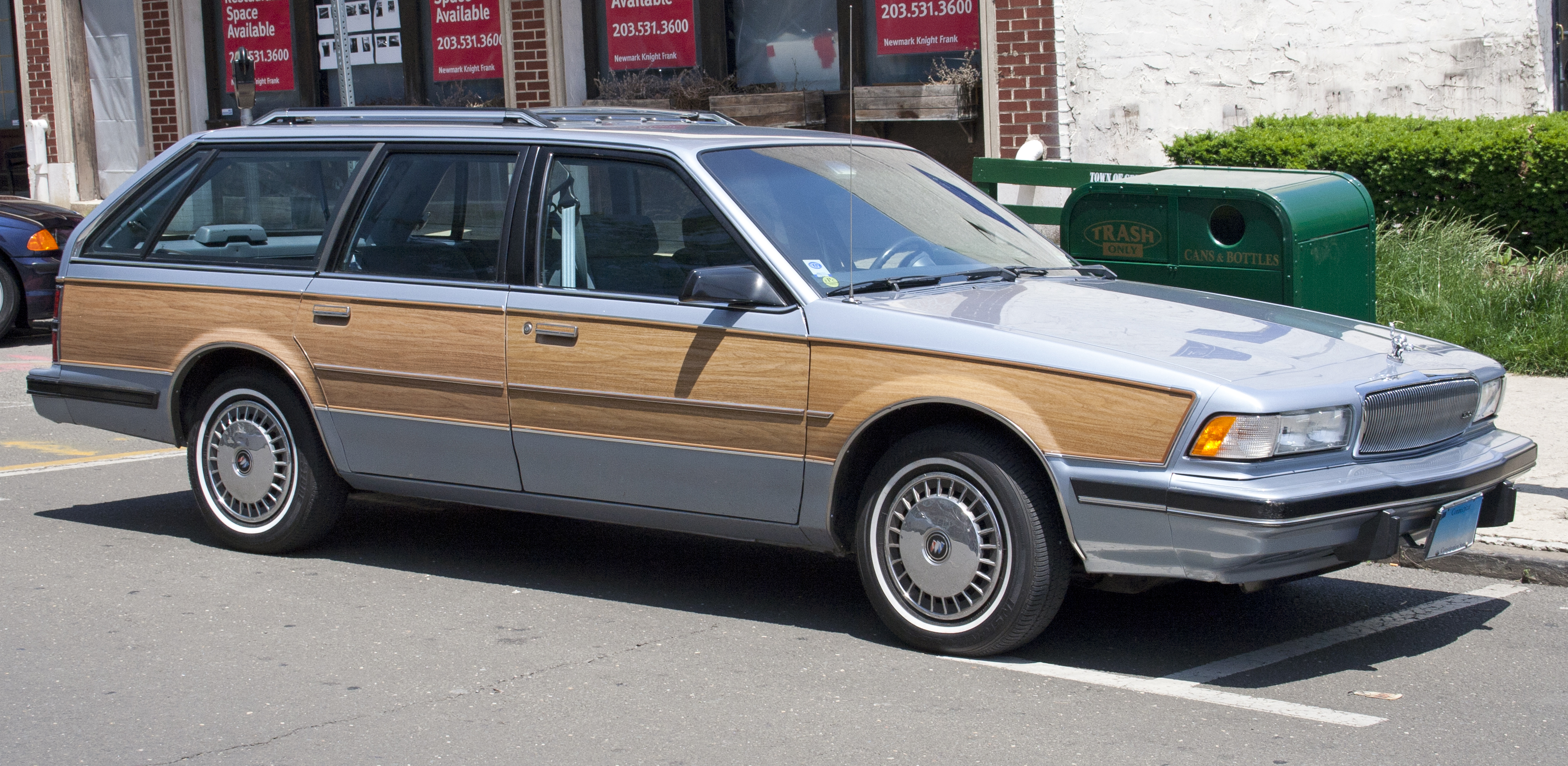
1994 Buick Century Estate

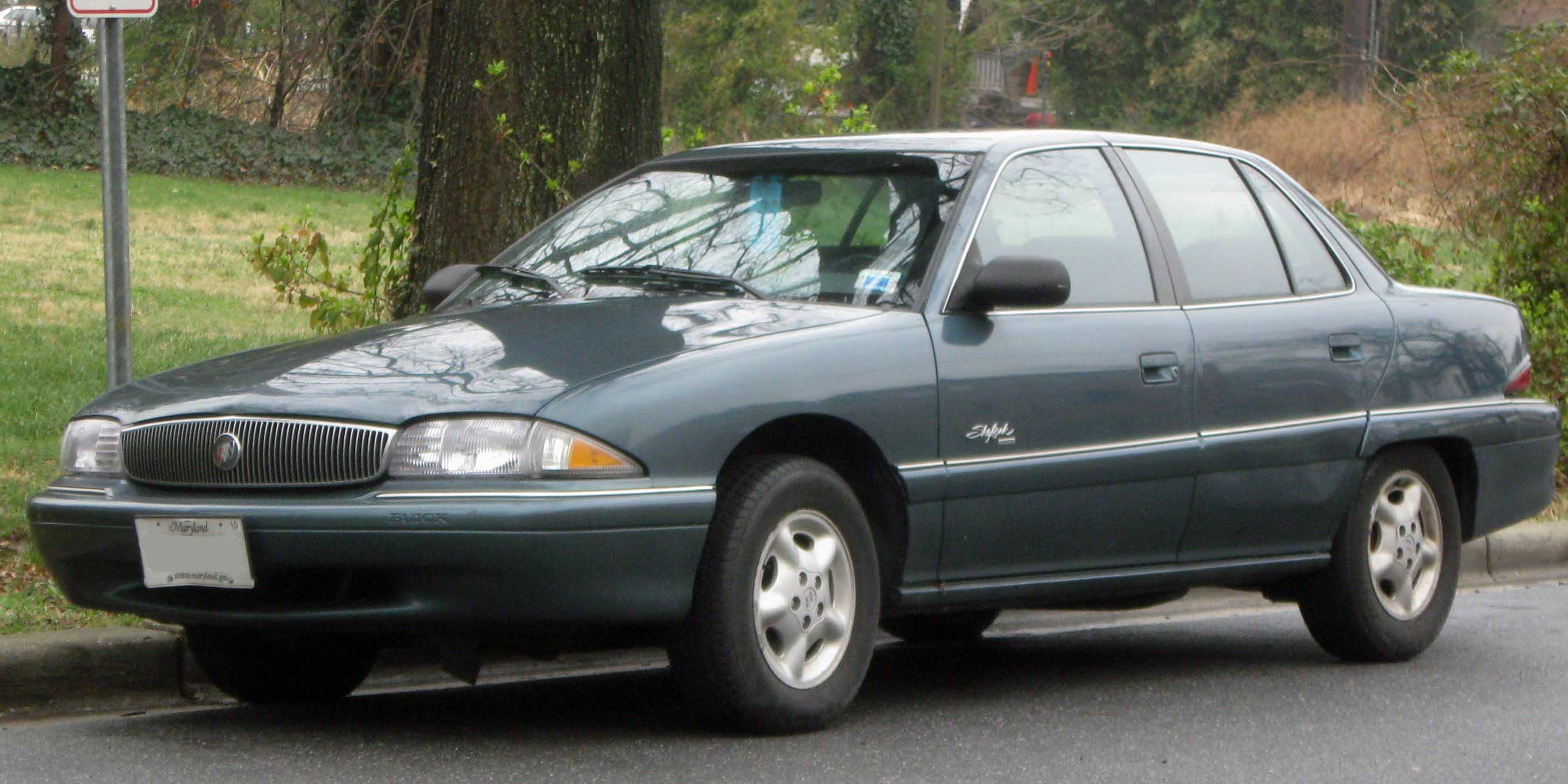
1996 Buick Skylark

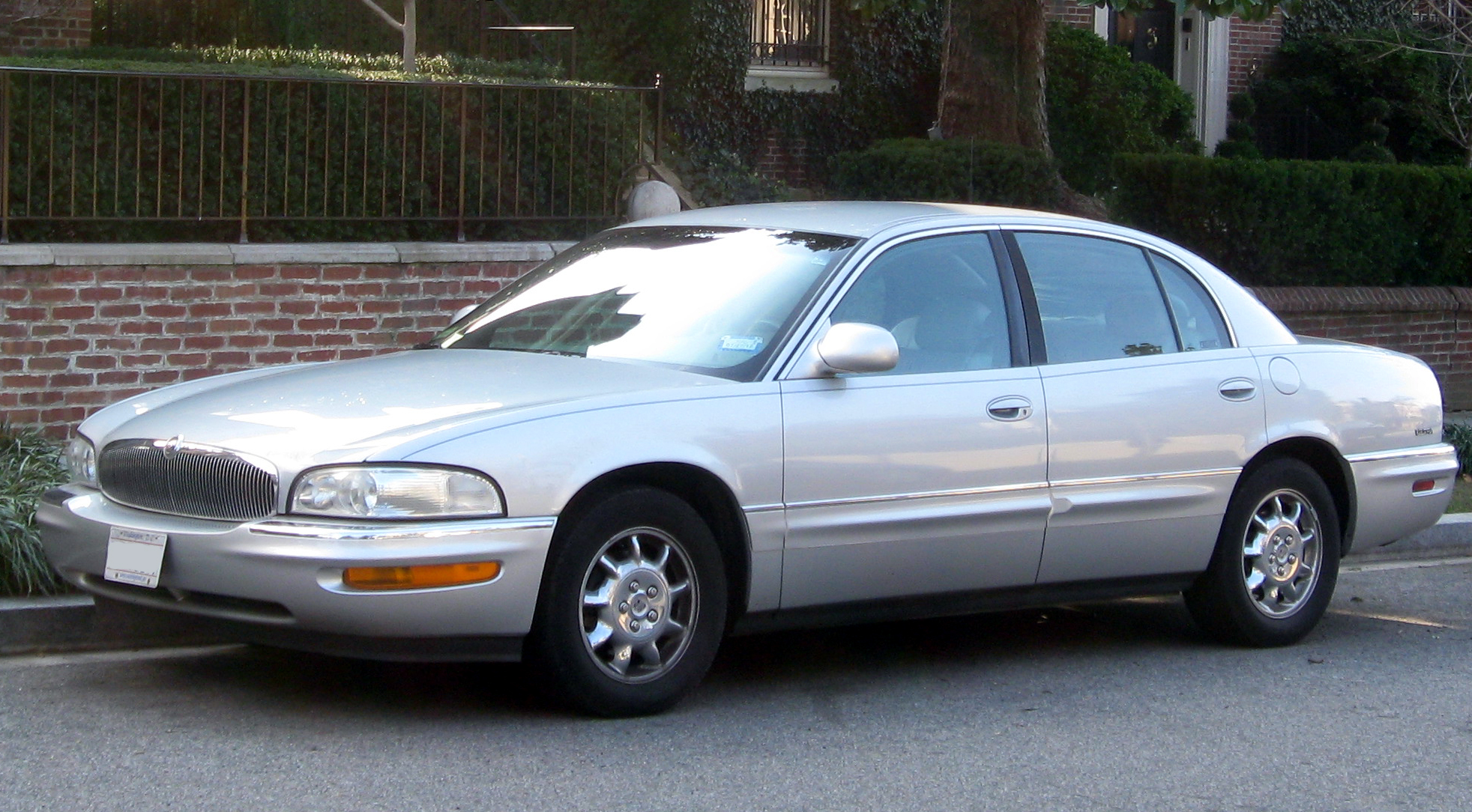
1997 Buick Park Avenue

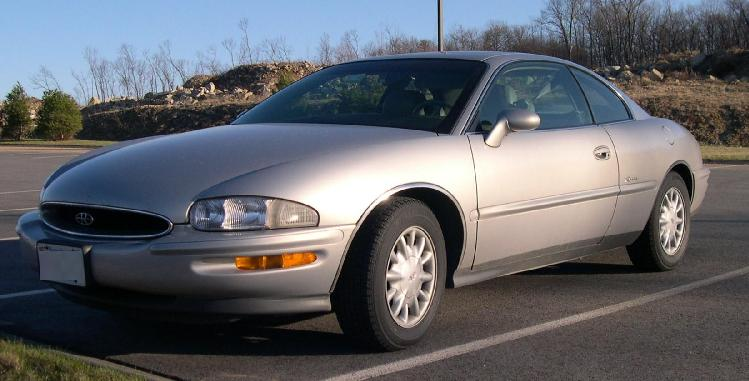
1999 Buick Riviera

==== 1980s ====
In the 1980s, Buick's lineup saw several changes including the downsizing of various models. In 1980, Lloyd Reuss was appointed as general manager and further pushed Buick into turbocharging, racing, and performance production cars, building momentum which continued a number of years after his departure in 1984 as he headed toward a brief term as GM president. Also in 1980, the Diesel engine became available on select Buick models and Somerset was introduced as an optional package on the Regal Limited. In 1981, the T-Type performance trim was introduced on the Riviera. Regal was the official pace car of the Indianapolis 500 race in 1981. In 1982, the Grand National high-performance package was first offered on Regal, helping Buick return to its #3 spot after 26 years. A soft-top Riviera helped lead the return of the convertible, which had disappeared from domestic lineups in 1976. The following year, a Riviera convertible with a twin-turbo V6 paced the Indy 500. Also in 1983, Buick had its best model year to date with 810,435 vehicles sold, and remained in #3 place.

In 1984, Buick was the official car of the XXIII Olympiad. A reorganization split manufacturing & engineering from sales and marketing. The first pilot Buick is produced at "Buick City", a state-of-the-art assembly center built inside the walls of Buick's home plant in Flint. Buick had its best model year sales to date with 906,626 vehicles sold plus Buick's worldwide sales topped one million for the first time. Lloyd Reuss ended his tenure as general manager of the Buick Motor Division in 1984.

For the 1985 model year, Buick introduced the downsized sixth-generation Electra, effectively GM's first front-drive, transverse-engine, full-size unibody cars — initially powered by a carbureted 3.0 liter Buick V6 engine, a fuel-injected 3.8 liter Buick V6 engine, or a 4.3 liter Oldsmobile diesel V6 engine. Each was mated to a 4-speed automatic transmission with a 0.70:1 overdrive gear. The 3.0 liter V6 and 4.3-liter diesel V6 were discontinued after 1985. During the 1985 through 1989 model years, the Electra name also continued to be used on the rear-wheel-drive B-body "Estate" station wagon. Also in 1985, Buick introduced the Somerset as its own model. Buick-powered cars won the pole and second position in qualifying for Indianapolis 500. Over the next few years, Buick engines would set a number of stock-block records and twice would power a third or more of the 33-car Indy 500 field (11 in 1990 and 12 in 1992). 1985 would be the final year for the rear-drive LeSabre before another downsizing and conversion to front-wheel-drive for 1986 (sedans and coupes only; the rear-drive LeSabre Estate Wagon would soldier on largely unchanged for a few more years). The top-line LeSabre Limited became the LeSabre Limited Collectors Edition to mark the end of an era for the rear-wheel-drive coupe and sedan; engine offerings included the standard 231 V6 (sedans and coupes) or optional Olds 307 V8 or Oldsmobile 350 diesel V8. 1985 saw Buick's best model year sales to date with 915,336 vehicles sold.

In 1986, the LeSabre was introduced on the new front wheel drive H platform, after departing from rear wheel drive on the GM B platform. Joining the LeSabre on the H-body included the Oldsmobile Delta 88. Like the previously introduced Electra, the LeSabre's hood was hinged at the front of the car instead of near the cowl and windshield. Styling and did not include Buick's long-standing ventiports or sweepspear styling cues. In 1986, a LeSabre Grand National model was built to qualify the coupe body style for NASCAR competition. Less than 120 units were made, all finished in black with a gray interior.

Also for 1986, the E-body Riviera was converted to unibody construction and further downsized to a 108 in (2,700 mm) wheelbase similar in length to that of the Buick Regal. The V6 was now the only engine, rated initially at 142 hp (106 kW) SAE and 200 lb⋅ft (270 N⋅m) of torque. It used the Turbo-Hydramatic 440-T4 automatic with a 2.84:1 final drive ratio. This generation was noted for advanced electronic instrumentation displayed on a dash-mounted 9-inch (230 mm) CRT. The CRT controlled the vehicle's climate control system and stereo, and also supplied advanced instrumentation such as a trip computer and maintenance reminder feature. Four-wheel disc brakes were standard. With a choice of three suspension packages available, up to the performance oriented FE3 setting, handling was notably improved. The Riviera placed fourth for Motor Trend's 1986 Car of the Year contest. Fuel economy was notably improved for the 1986 Riviera, but the investment in the downsized, transverse engine front-wheel drive platform resulted in a substantial price increase to $19,831 for the base model to $21,577 for the new T-Type. Downsizing also resulted in a dimensional similarity to smaller, less expensive offerings from GM. The smaller dimensions, generic styling, and lack of a V8 led to Riviera sales plummeting to 22,138 for 1986.

In 1987, the last of the turbo/intercooled Regal Grand Nationals, often called the quickest American cars, were offered as well as 547 even quicker special edition '87 GNXs. It would also be the last year for the rear-wheel-drive Regal. General manager Ed Mertz promoted the new "Premium American Motorcars" theme which focused Buick marketing on the various qualities that made the marque famous.

In 1988, Buick was the official car of the U.S. Olympic Team. The Reatta two-seater was introduced, to be followed two years later by a convertible. Also in 1988, Regal was downsized and converted to front-wheel drive. Bobby Allison won the Daytona 500 in a Regal that year. 1988 also saw the debut of the slogan "The Great American Road Belongs to Buick".

In 1989, a new Electra trim level was offered called the Park Avenue Ultra. The Ultra was an upgrade to the Electra Park Avenue and featured a standard leather-trimmed interior with dual 20-way power front seats (shared with Cadillac's restyled 1989 Fleetwood Sixty Special), lower-body accent exterior paint treatment, distinctive thick-padded vinyl top with limousine-style rear-window surround (available only on Ultra), simulated burled elm trim on the doors and instrument panel, unique aluminum wheels, anti-lock brakes, chromed B-pillar moldings, specific grille and tail lamps, leather-wrapped steering wheel, electronic instrumentation, padded glove-compartment door, unique interior door panel trim, and a variety of otherwise minor changes. With its long list of standard equipment, the Park Avenue Ultra carried a higher base price than Cadillac's Sedan de Ville. The Riviera was also restyled for 1989, adding 11 inches to its overall length. In the late 1980s, the Flint-built LeSabre ranked #1 in North America and #2 in the world in a major independent quality study which eventually led Buick to change its ad slogan from "The Great American Road Belongs to Buick" to "Buick: The New Symbol for Quality in America."

==== 1990s ====
In 1990, the first Reatta convertible was produced. 1990 was also the last year for the Electra as Park Avenue, previously a trim level on the Electra, became its own model for the 1991 model year. In 1991, Buick led the industry in improvement in sales and market share. A new four-door Regal came to market for 1991, the first Regal sedan since 1984. Buick also introduced a supercharged 3.8-liter V6 in the Park Avenue Ultra. Supercharging became so popular at Buick that by the new millennium, Buick was the leading marketer and industry leader of supercharged cars. 1991 saw the return of the Roadmaster after a 33-year absence. The Roadmaster was first offered as a wagon only and then a sedan was added for 1992.

For 1992, the popular LeSabre was redesigned along the same lines as the previous year's Park Avenue. 1992 also saw the introduction of a new, redesigned Skylark. In 1993, a special edition LeSabre was sold to commemorate Buick's 90th anniversary. In addition to Custom trim level standard equipment, included were "90th Anniversary" badging, cassette player, cruise control, rear-window defogger, power driver's seat, carpeted floor mats, exterior pinstripes, and choice of wire or aluminum wheel covers.

In 1995, after a hiatus in 1994, the Riviera returned with radical styling that departed from the previous generations' more traditional image. A 205 hp (153 kW) naturally aspirated 3800 V6 was standard, with a supercharged version rated at 225 hp (168 kW) and 275 lb⋅ft (373 N⋅m) available as an option. Rivieras were now assembled in Lake Orion, Michigan, riding the same Cadillac-derived G platform as the 4-door Oldsmobile Aurora.

In 1996, both the Roadmaster sedan and wagon were discontinued. In 1998, after 95 years in Flint, Buick's headquarters was moved to Detroit. Bob Coletta, Buick general manager, saw the first Chinese Buick roll off the line at Shanghai before he turned over the top Buick job to Roger Adams. Buick Gallery and Research Center opened at Flint's Sloan Museum. A reorganization of the division split sales from marketing.

In 1999, the last of nearly 16 million Buicks were built in Flint's Buick City. The last car, a 1999 LeSabre, rolled off the assembly line on June 29 that year. In a major independent quality study, Buick ranked #2 (and top domestic) among 37 international brands and Buick City shared the top world position among automotive assembly plants. With sales of all coupes declining in the North American market, GM decided to discontinue the Riviera. 1999 was the car's last model year with production ceasing on November 25, 1998. The final 200 cars had special silver paint and trim and were denoted "Silver Arrow" models, a designation which hearkened back to several Silver Arrow show cars that had been built off Riviera bodies by Bill Mitchell. The eighth generation Rivieras received the most powerful V6 Buick engine since the Grand Nationals of the 1980s. The supercharged OHV V6 allowed the car to accelerate from 0 to 60 miles per hour (97 km/h) in under 7 seconds, complete the 1/4 mile in 15.5 seconds, and achieve MPG fuel efficiency ratings of 18 city/27 highway.

=== Recent years ===
2000s–2010s

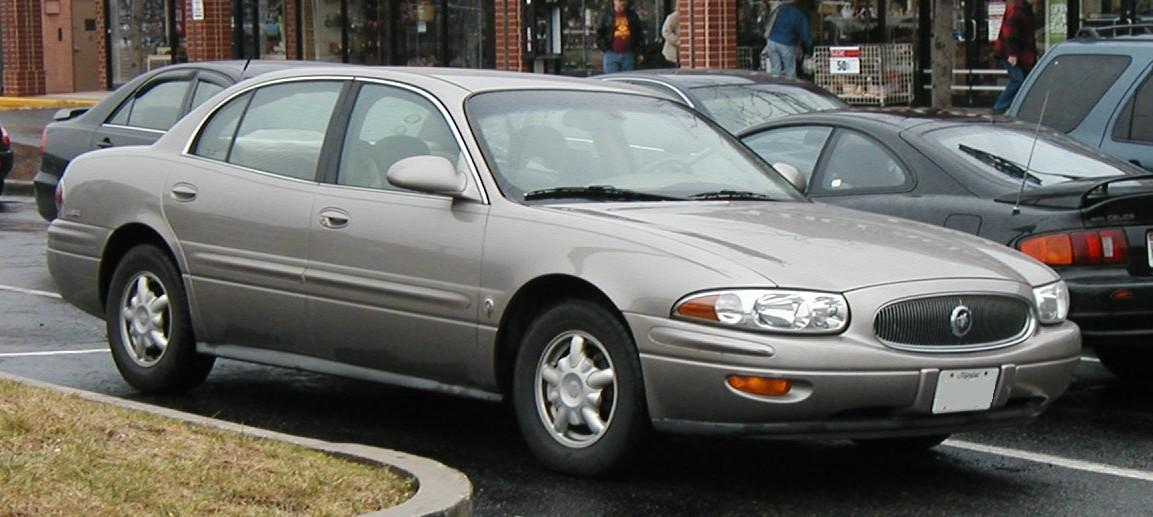
2000 Buick LeSabre

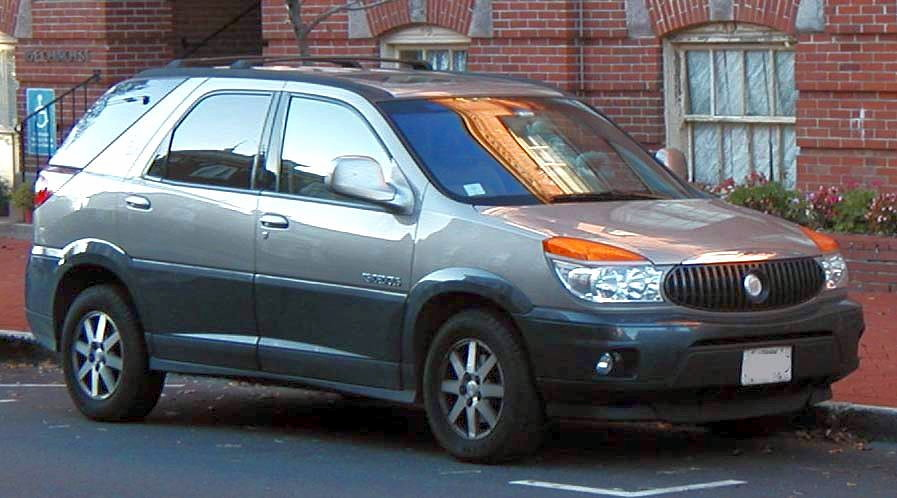
2002 Buick Rendezvous

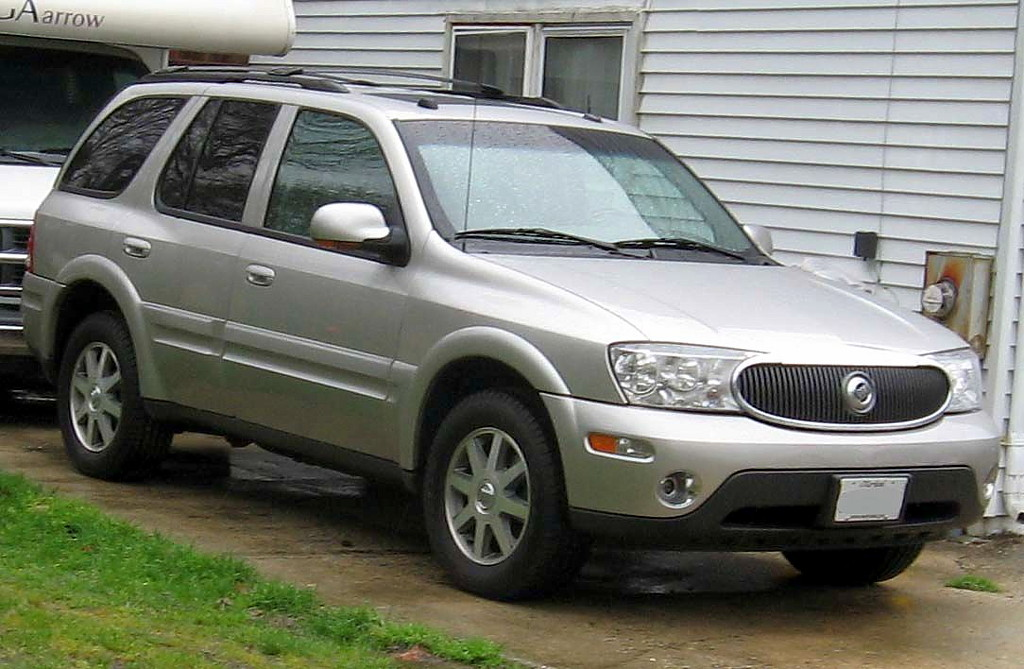
2004 Buick Rainier CXL

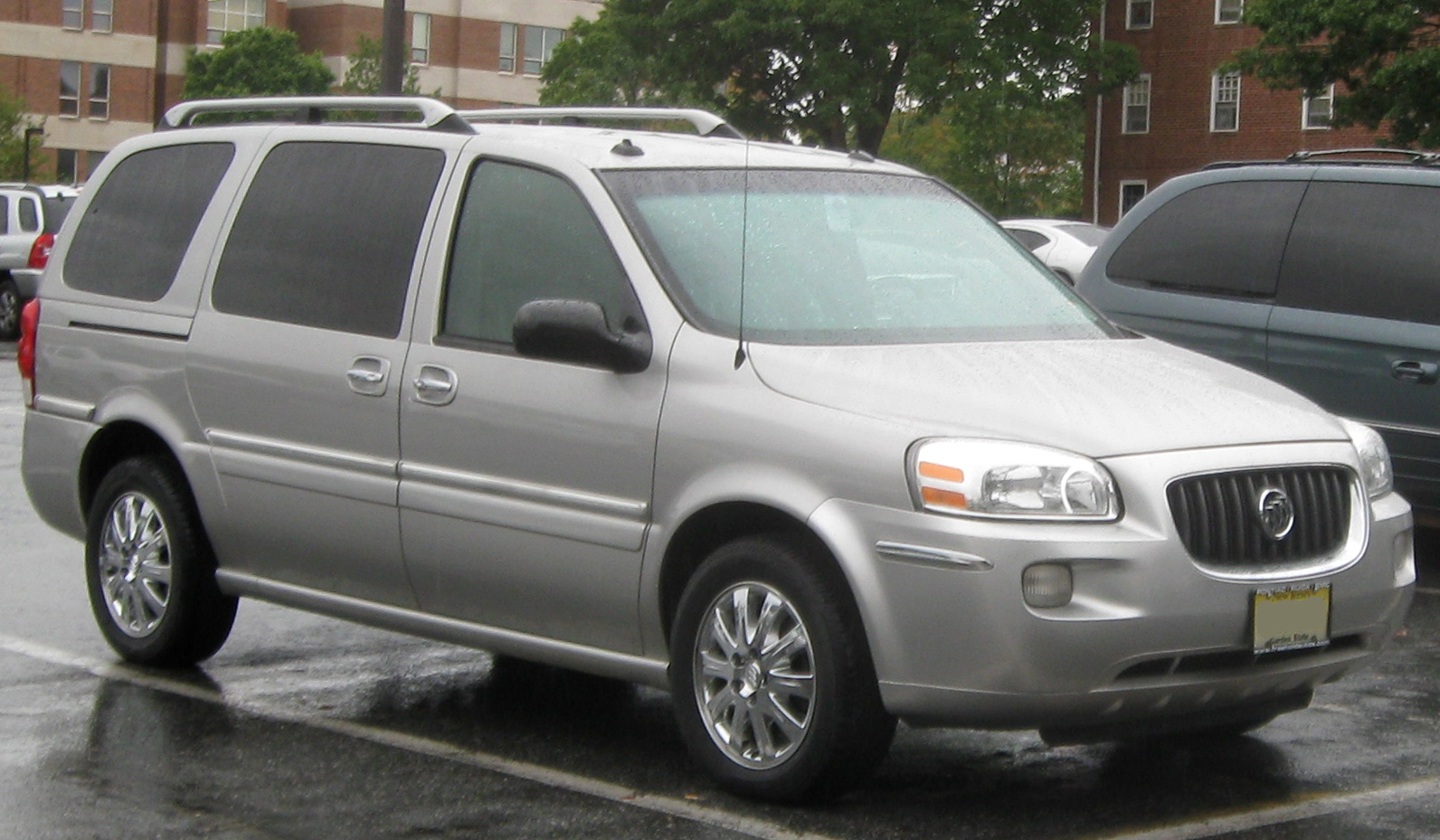
2005 Buick Terraza

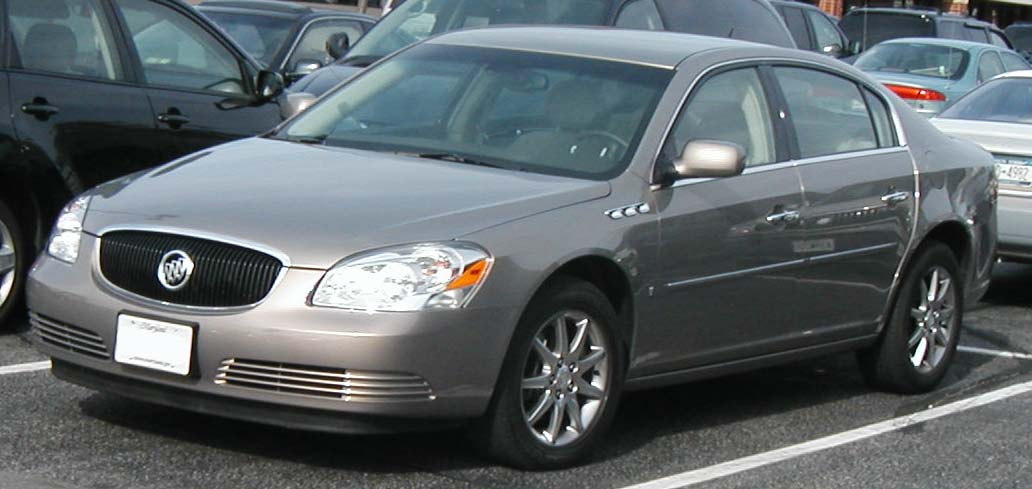
2006 Buick Lucerne CXL

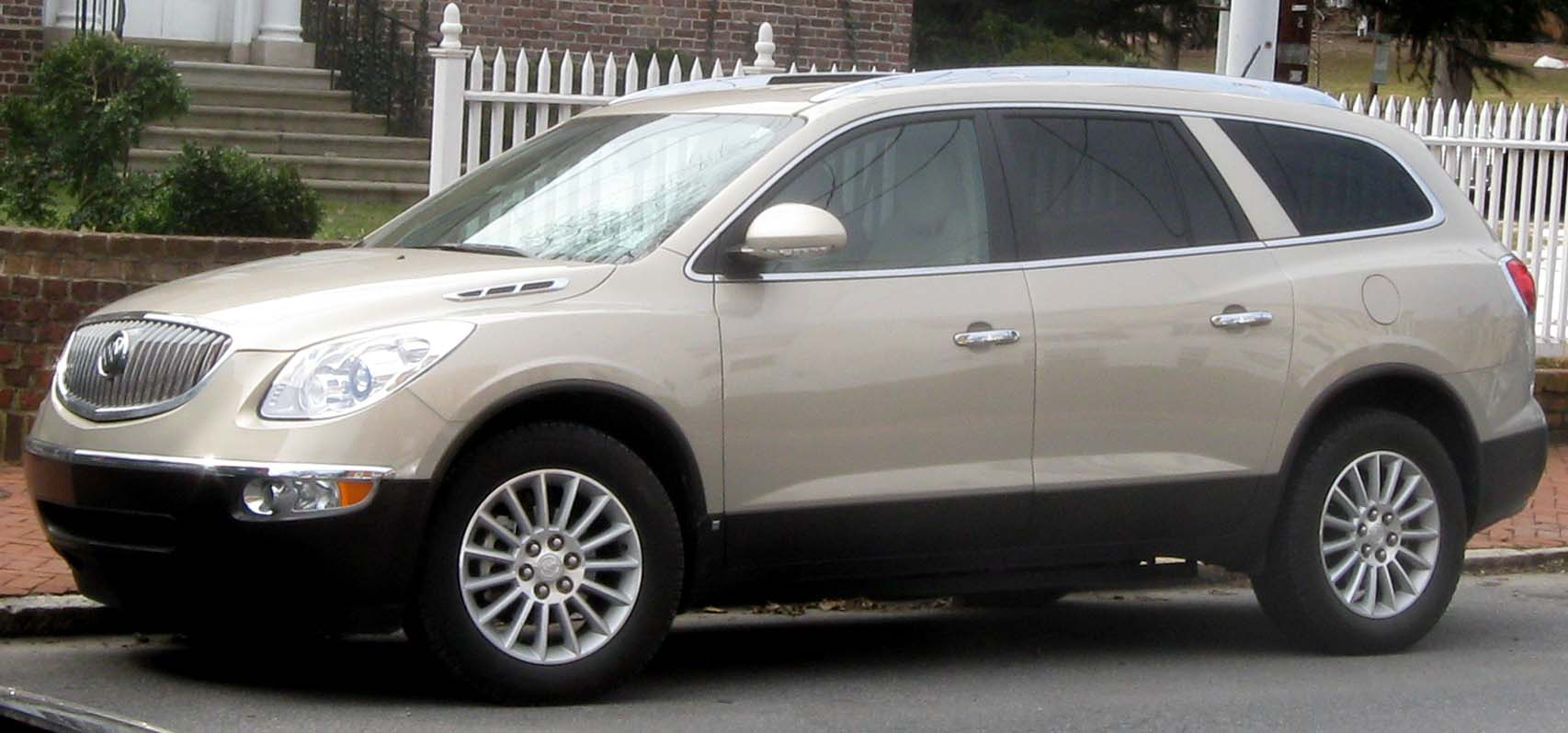
2008 Buick Enclave CXL

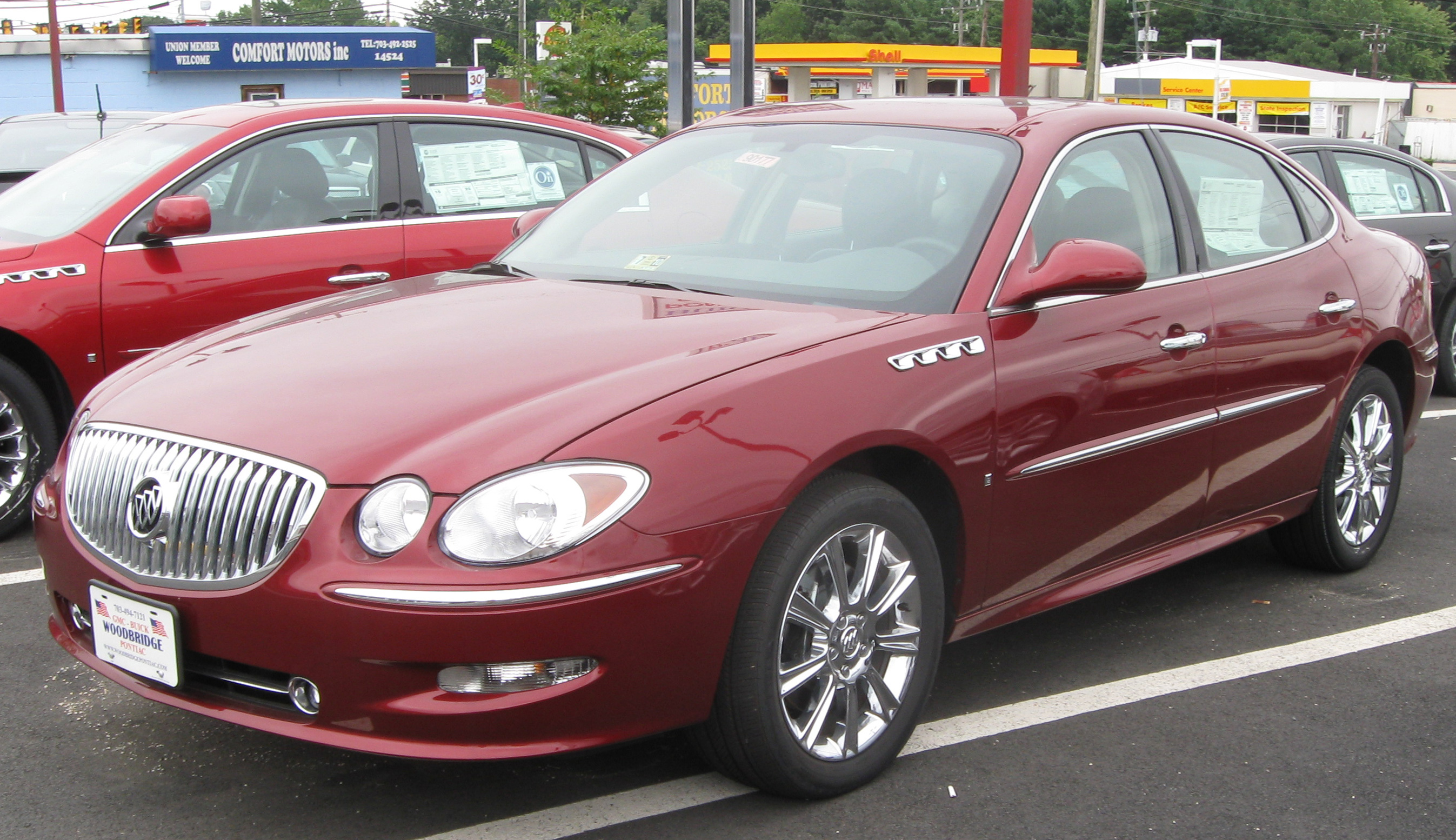
2009 Buick LaCrosse Super

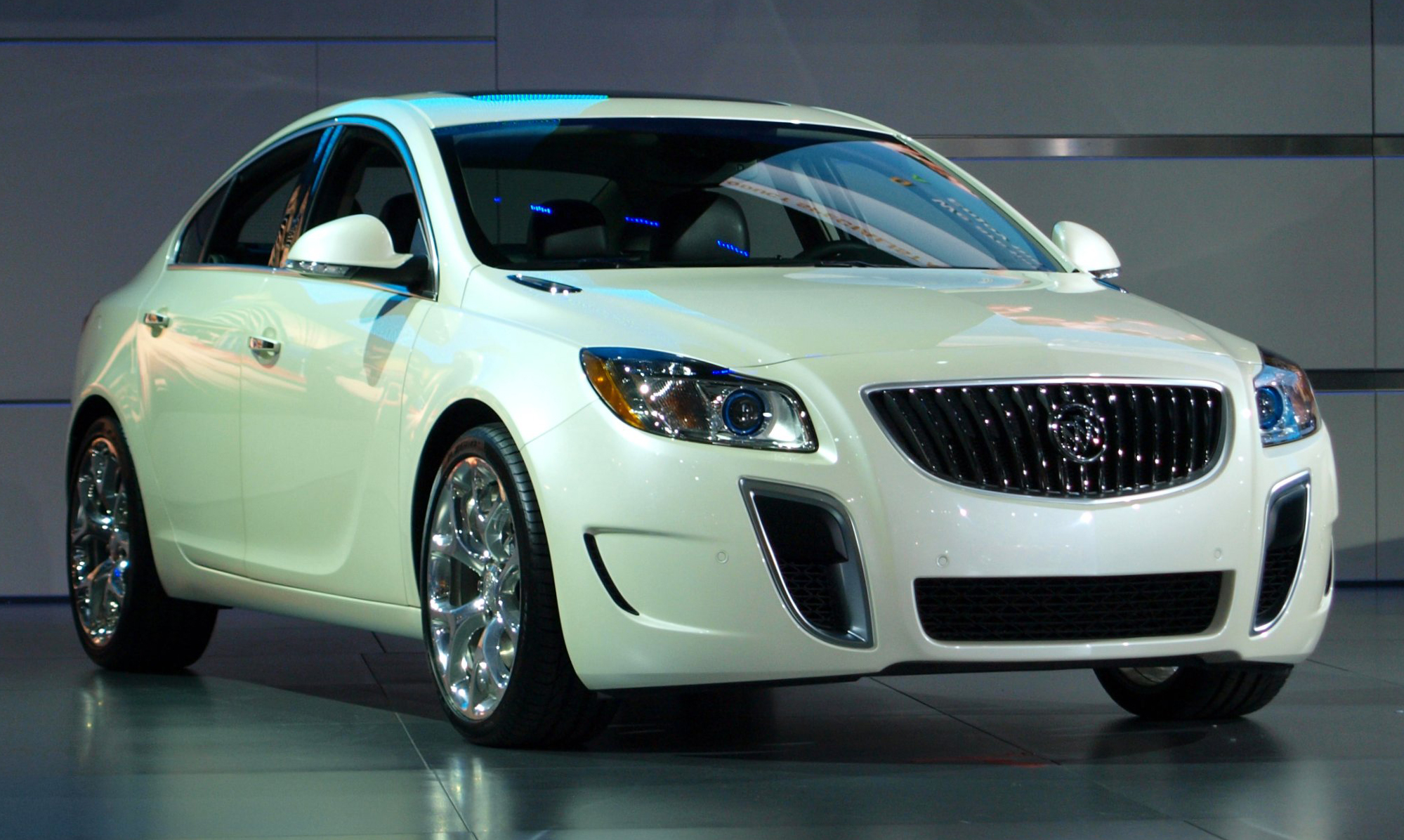
2011 Buick Regal GS

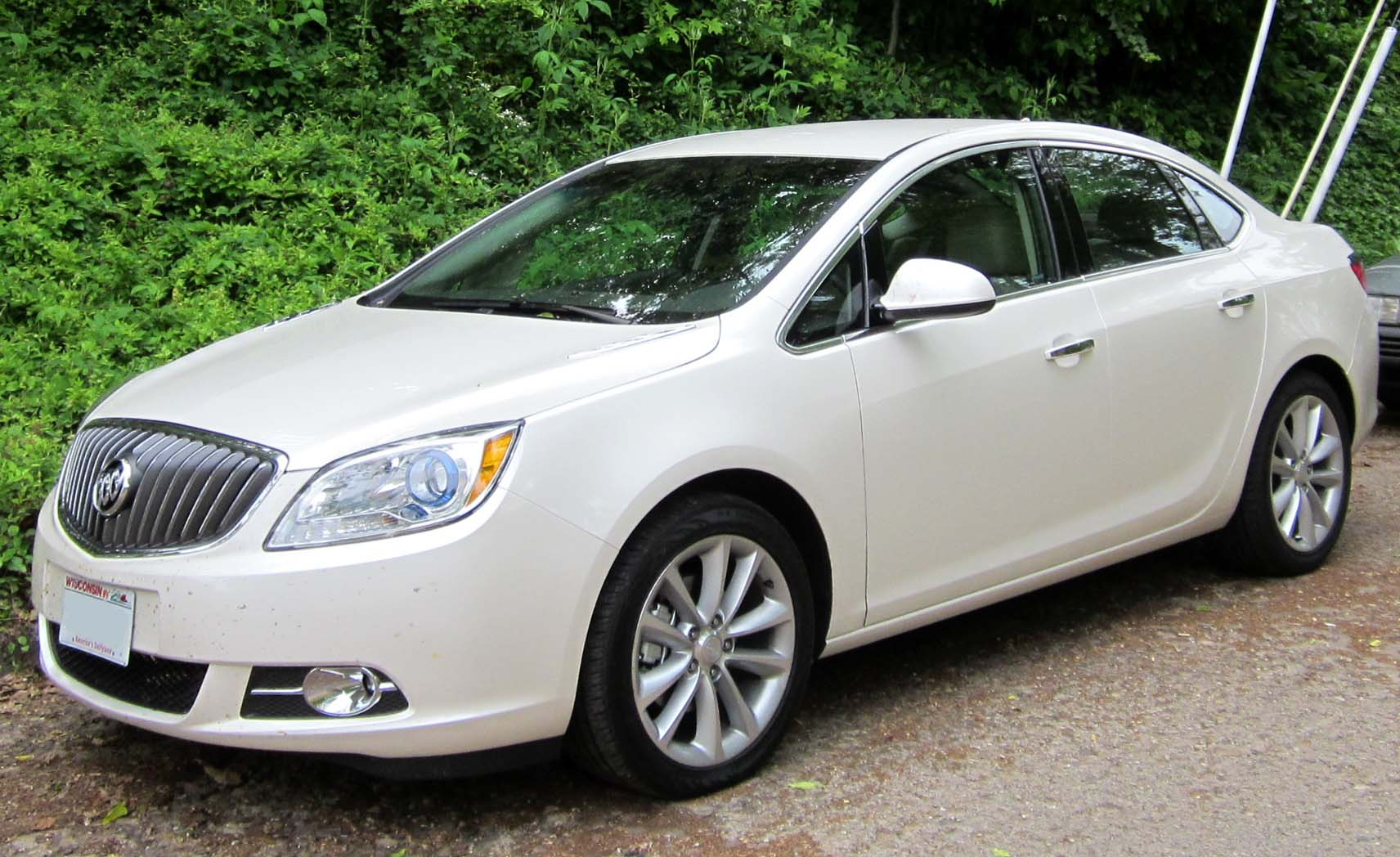
2012 Buick Verano

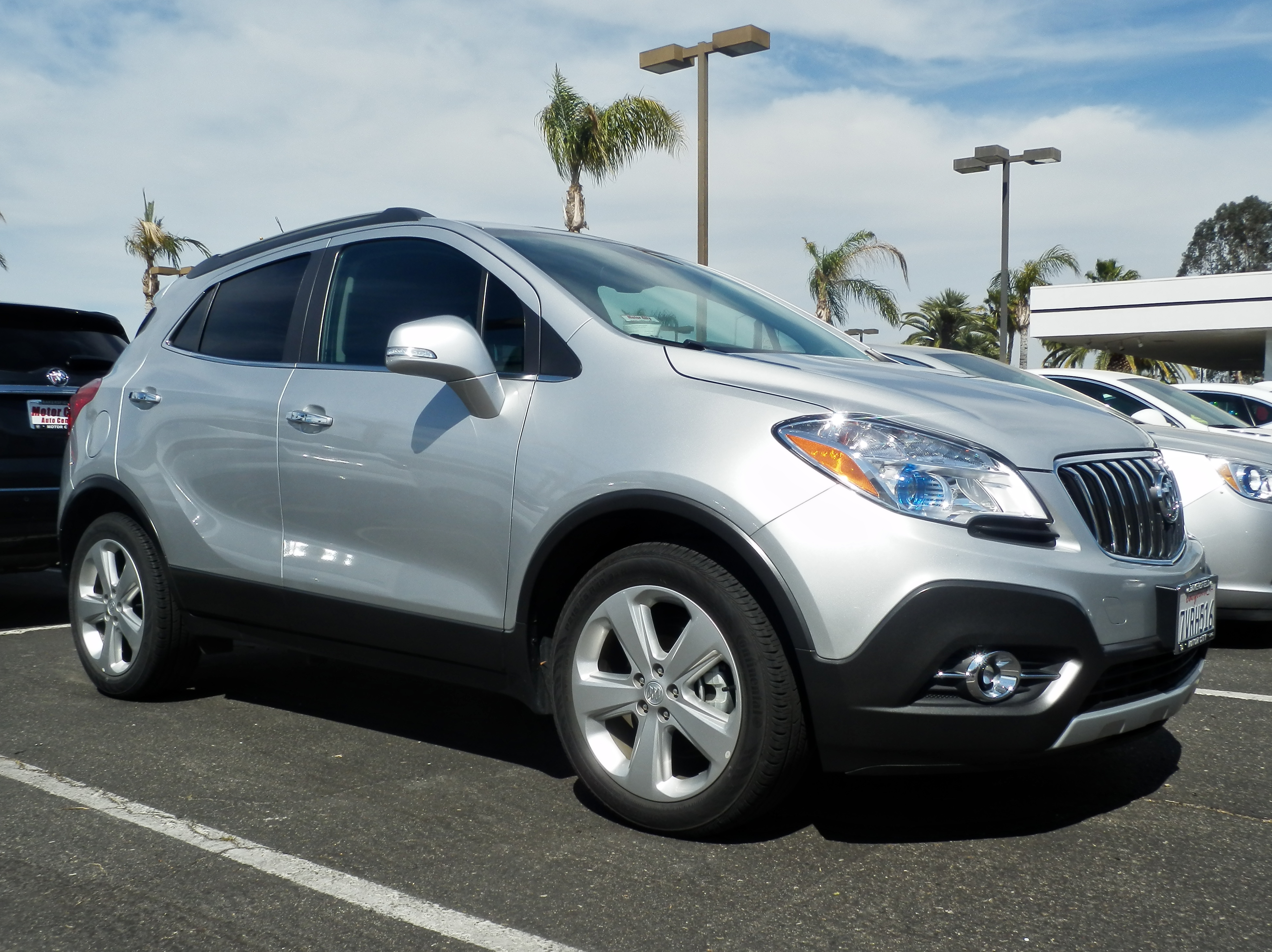
2013 Buick Encore

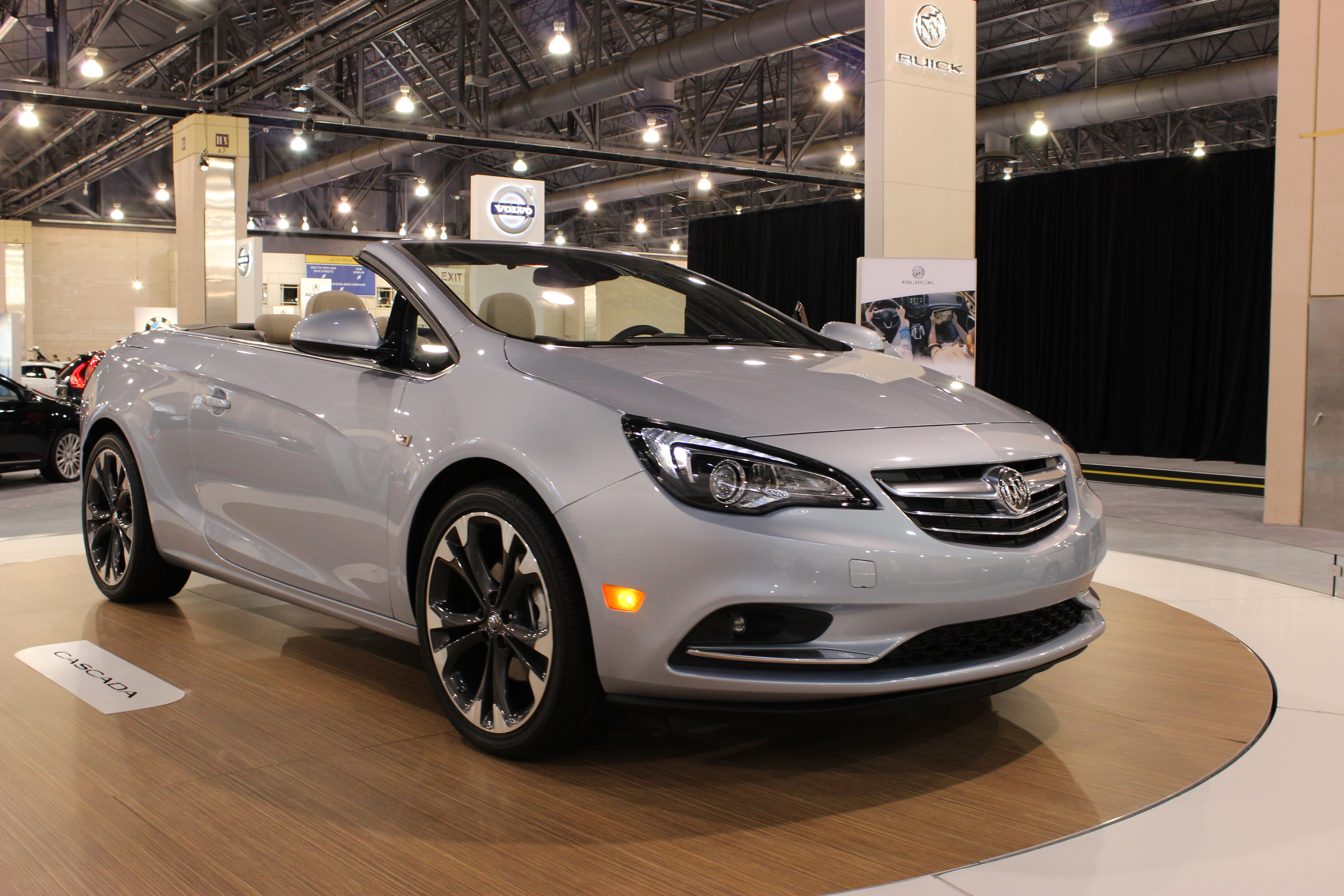
2016 Buick Cascada Premium

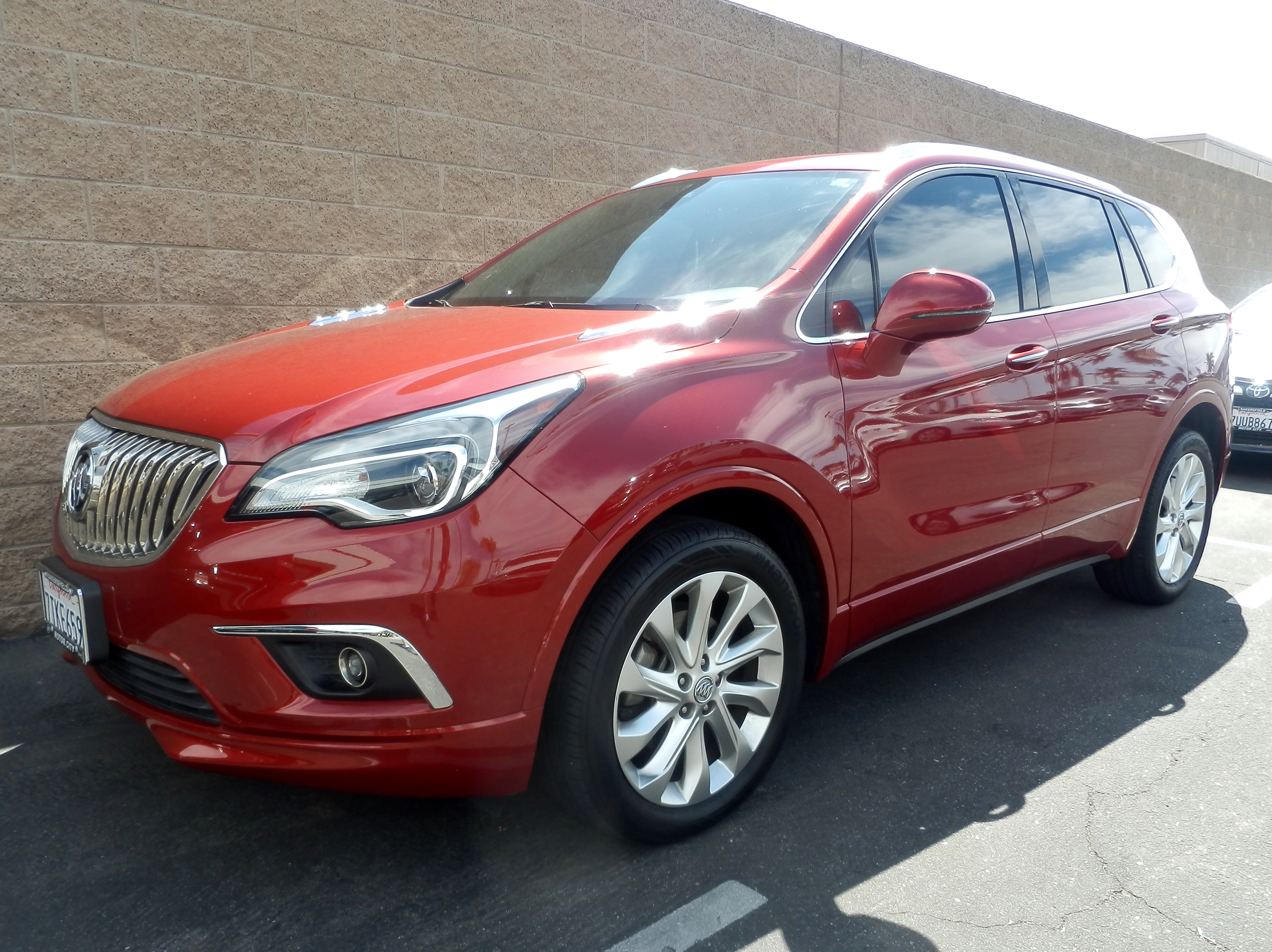
2016 Buick Envision Premium

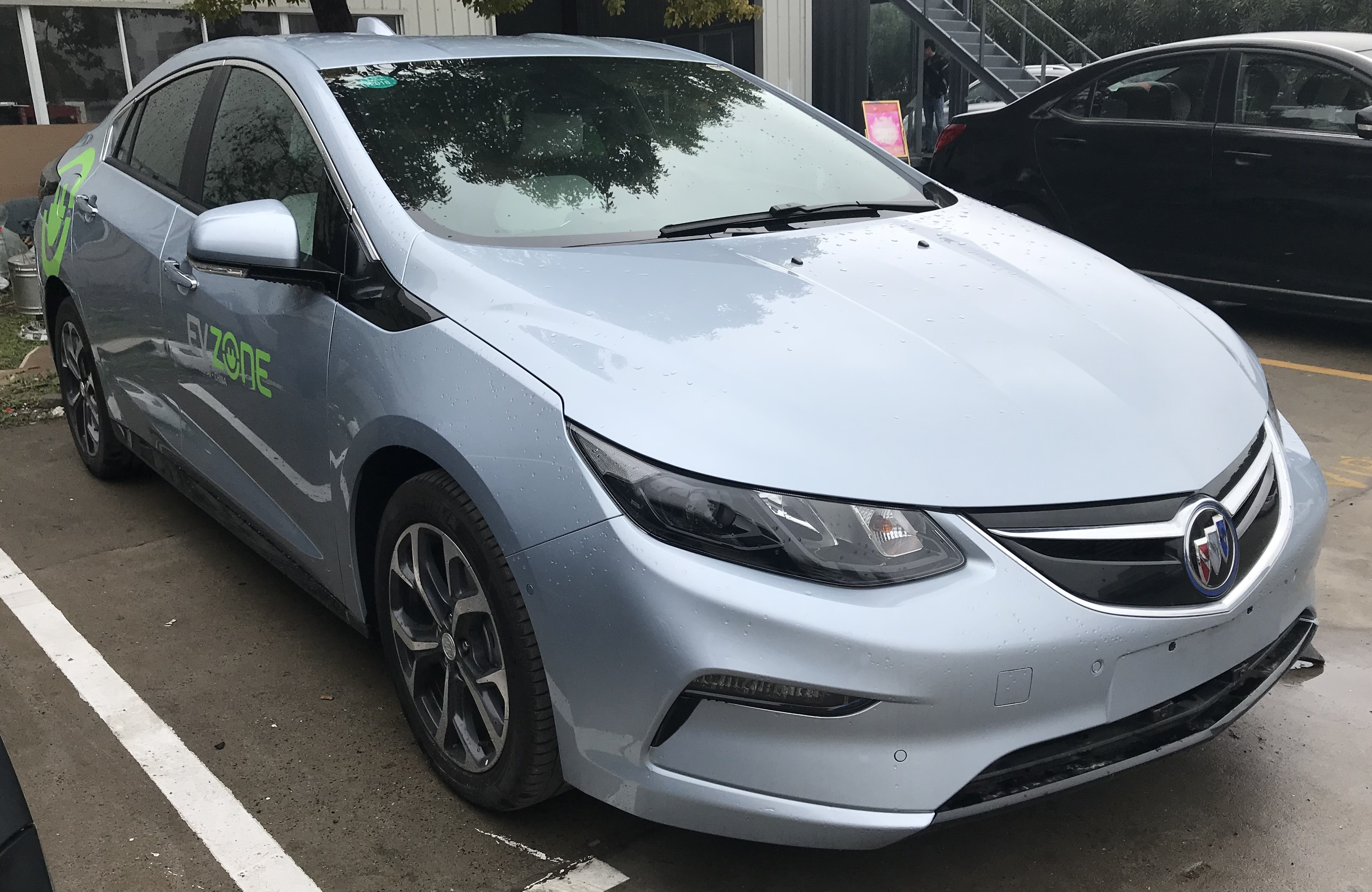
2017 Buick Velite 5

==== 2000s ====
In the 2000s, Buick's lineup was modified with the compact and performance segments being abandoned in favor of the crossover/SUV market which was growing in popularity. In 2000, Buick headed into the new millennium with a redesigned LeSabre (best-selling U.S. full-size car for eight straight years) and a more powerful Century. Since the first Detroit experimental car of 1899–1900 and the first Flint production car of 1904, more than 35 million Buicks had been built. The 2000 LeSabre was introduced in March 1999 and was now built on GM's G platform; however, GM chose to continue to refer to it as the H platform. The LeSabre was manufactured at GM's Detroit/Hamtramck Assembly factory in Hamtramck, Michigan and Lake Orion Assembly, in Lake Orion, Michigan. Some of the changes with the redesign included a new grille that did not open with the hood and slightly smaller exterior dimensions. Despite its somewhat smaller exterior size, it still offered similar interior room and more trunk space than the previous model. 2001 saw Buick's first entry into the crossover market with the introduction of the Rendezvous as a 2002 model. In 2003, the Buick Centieme crossover concept car commemorated Buick Motor Division's 100th anniversary. Some of the Centieme's exterior design and interior features would later appear on the 2008 Enclave crossover. In 2004, Buick added the Rainier mid-size SUV, and the new Terraza minivan was added a year later.

In the years following, Buick began consolidating its North American lineup and by 2008 had reduced it to just three models: the LaCrosse/Allure, the Lucerne, and the new-for-2008 Enclave. The Super name had also returned after a 50-year absence as a new performance trim level on LaCrosse and Lucerne. The brand's total overall sales slipped in the United States, and, with a reputation for primarily appealing to older buyers, rumors circulated throughout this decade that the Buick marque would be discontinued. The profitability of the model lineup and popularity in China ensured Buick's future within General Motors, with the decision being made to discontinue the Pontiac brand instead.

Since 2005, GM had gradually consolidated Buick with GMC and former Pontiac dealerships to create the current Buick-GMC network. During General Motors Chapter 11 reorganization and emergence in 2009, the company designated Buick as a "core brand", citing the division's success in China. Behind the scenes, GM began to move products originally planned for other brands to Buick. The Opel Insignia was originally intended to become the second-generation Saturn Aura, but instead became the new Buick Regal. In the 2009 J.D. Power and Associates Vehicle Dependability Study, Buick tied with Jaguar as the most dependable brand in the United States.

==== 2010s ====
The 2010s included the return of a classic Buick nameplate, the Buick Regal, and several new model names. The decade also saw the brand's first hatchback since 1987, its first factory convertible since 1991, and its first station wagon since 1996. Buick further expanded its presence in the popular crossover/SUV market in the 2010s.

In January 2009, Buick unveiled the new 2010 LaCrosse sedan, an all-new styling direction that included traditional Buick cues. The market responded positively to the LaCrosse and reviews favorably compared it to luxury models such as the Lexus ES. In 2010, Buick became the fastest-growing automotive brand in America and attracted a younger customer demographic. A GM company spokesman at the time said that Buick was positioned as a "premium" marque (entry-level luxury) to compete with various Acura, Infiniti, Lexus, and Volvo models, while Cadillac was aimed at the "luxury" performance segment which includes brands like BMW and Mercedes-Benz.

An all-new Regal sedan, a smaller model based on the European Opel Insignia, was re-introduced for the 2011 model year after a seven-year absence. For 2012, the all-new Verano, which was a compact sedan based on the Chevrolet Cruze, joined the lineup. Additionally, the performance-oriented Regal GS officially went on sale and became the first Buick in almost 20 years to be offered with a manual transmission and a turbocharger. Buick also entered the hybrid market with the introduction of eAssist technology on the 2012 LaCrosse and Regal which helped improve fuel economy ratings by as much as 38% over the regular gas-engine versions. Meanwhile, sales of the Enclave crossover remained strong. In January 2012, the all-new Encore mini crossover was unveiled at the North American International Auto Show in Detroit. Also in 2012, a turbocharged version of the Verano was introduced and the Enclave was redesigned for the 2013 model year. In 2013, GM confirmed plans for a "hybrid global brand" which includes Opel/Vauxhall and Buick using more synergies between the brands. LaCrosse and Regal were refreshed for the 2014 model year. In 2015, the all-new Cascada subcompact convertible debuted at the North American International Auto Show in Detroit. The all-new 2017 LaCrosse was shown at the 2015 Los Angeles Auto Show in November 2015, as a 2017 model. Buick also confirmed that the Envision compact crossover would be sold in North America starting summer 2016. The Verano compact sedan was dropped from the Buick lineup in North America in 2017. With GM selling off the Opel/Vauxhall division to PSA Group in March 2017, Buick is expected to move away from sharing the Opel model/designs upon the completion of the current generation vehicles.

For 2018, Buick replaced the Regal sedan with an all-new model offering hatchback and station wagon body styles. This new Regal was the first hatchback from Buick for the North American market since the 1987 Skyhawk and the first station wagon since the 1996 Roadmaster. A sub-brand was also added in 2018 to accompany Buick, with the Avenir badge being applied to its top-of-the-line level trims, utilizing the same strategy as GMC's successful Denali sub-brand. 2019 would be the last year for the Cascada convertible globally and the LaCrosse sedan for the North American market.

==== 2020s ====
Buick logo used until 2023

New for 2020 was the Encore GX crossover which slotted in between the existing Encore and Envision. The Regal hatchback and station wagon were discontinued for the North American market in 2020.

In June 2022, Buick Global Chief Duncan Aldred announced that Buick would transition its entire line-up to electric vehicles by 2030. As part of that plan, all Buick dealers would be given the opportunity to take a buyout rather than switch to all-electric. Aldred explained the move saying that making the transition to electric would require a considerable investment in upgrading dealer facilities and not all dealers would be willing to make the financial commitment. Aldrerd also pointed out that most Buick dealers also sold other GM products, so accepting the buyout would not necessarily result in a dealership closing. Once Buick's top-selling model in North America, the Encore was discontinued in 2022 as more customers favored the larger Encore GX which was introduced for 2020 and became Buick's new top seller. In 2023, the Envista launched for the 2024 model year.

For the 2027 model year, Buick's North American lineup consists of the Envista and Encore GX subcompact crossovers, the Envision compact crossover, and the Enclave mid-size crossover.

== Leadership ==
- David Dunbar Buick (1903–1904)
- William C. Durant (1904–1910)
- Charles W. Nash (1910–1916)
- Walter P. Chrysler (1917–1919)
- Harry H. Bassett (1919–1926)
- Edward T. Strong (1927–1933)
- Harlow H. Curtice (1933–1948)
- Ivan L. Wiles (1948–1956)
- Edward T. Ragsdale (1956–1959)
- Edward D. Rollert (1959–1963)
- Robert L. Kessler (1965–1970)
- Lee N.Mays (1970–1972)
- George R. Elges (1972–1975)
- David C. Collier (1975–1976)
- Donald H. McPherson (1976–1980)
- Lloyd Reuss (1980–1986)
- Edward H. Mertz (1987–1997)
- Robert E. Coletta (1998–2000)
- Roger W. Adams (2000–2004)
- Peter Fraleigh (2004–2005)
- John Larson (2005–2007)
- Steve Shannon (2008–2009)
- Susan Docherty (2009)
- Brian K. Sweeney (2009–2014)
- Duncan Aldred (2014–2024)
- Jaclyn McQuaid (2024–2026)
- Michael MacPhee (2026–present)

== Production models ==
=== Current ===
==== China ====
- Century (2022–present) – minivan
- Electra E5 (2023–present) – mid-size crossover SUV
- Electra L7 (2025–present) – full-size sedan
- Electra Encasa (2025–present) – minivan
- Envision S (2015–present) – compact crossover SUV
- Envision Plus (2021–present) – mid-size crossover SUV
- GL8 (2000–present) – minivan
- LaCrosse (2006–present) – mid-size sedan
- Regal (1999–present) – mid-size sedan
- Velite 6 (2019–present) – compact station wagon
- Verano (2010–present) – compact sedan

==== North America ====
- Enclave (2008–present) – full-size crossover SUV
- Encore GX (2020–present) – subcompact crossover SUV
- Envision (2016–present) – compact crossover SUV
- Envista (2024–present) – subcompact crossover SUV

Current lineup (China)

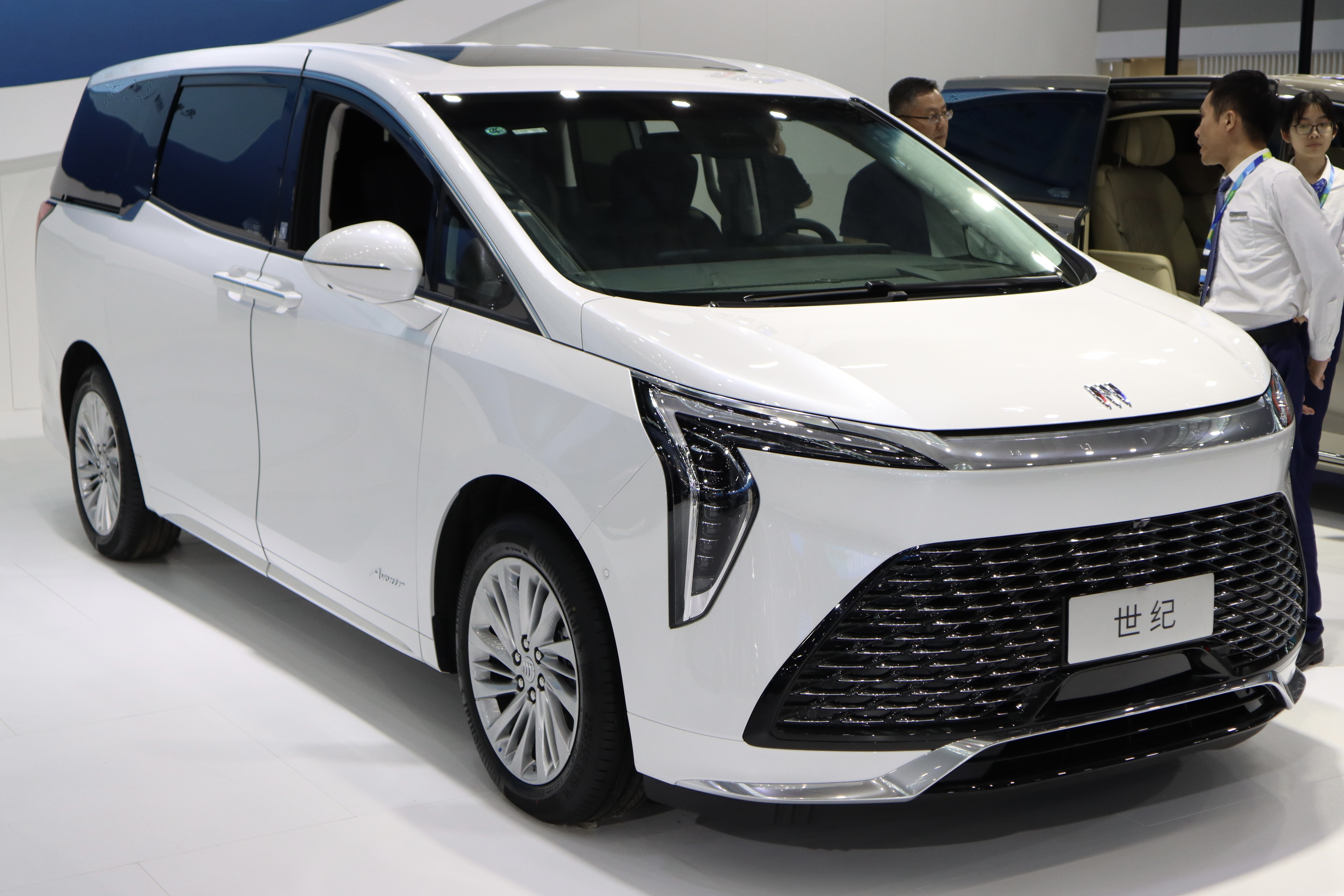
Century

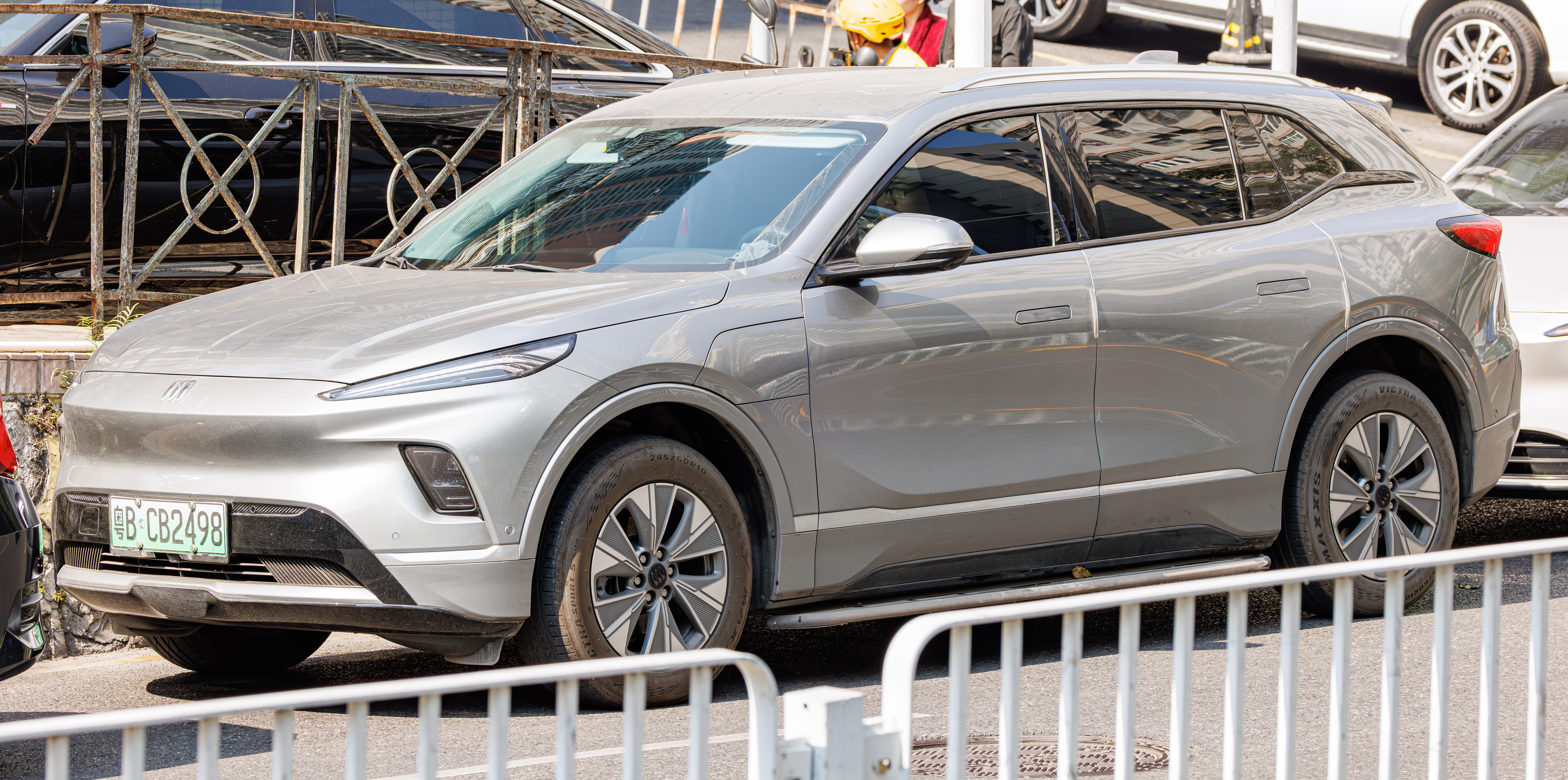
Electra E5

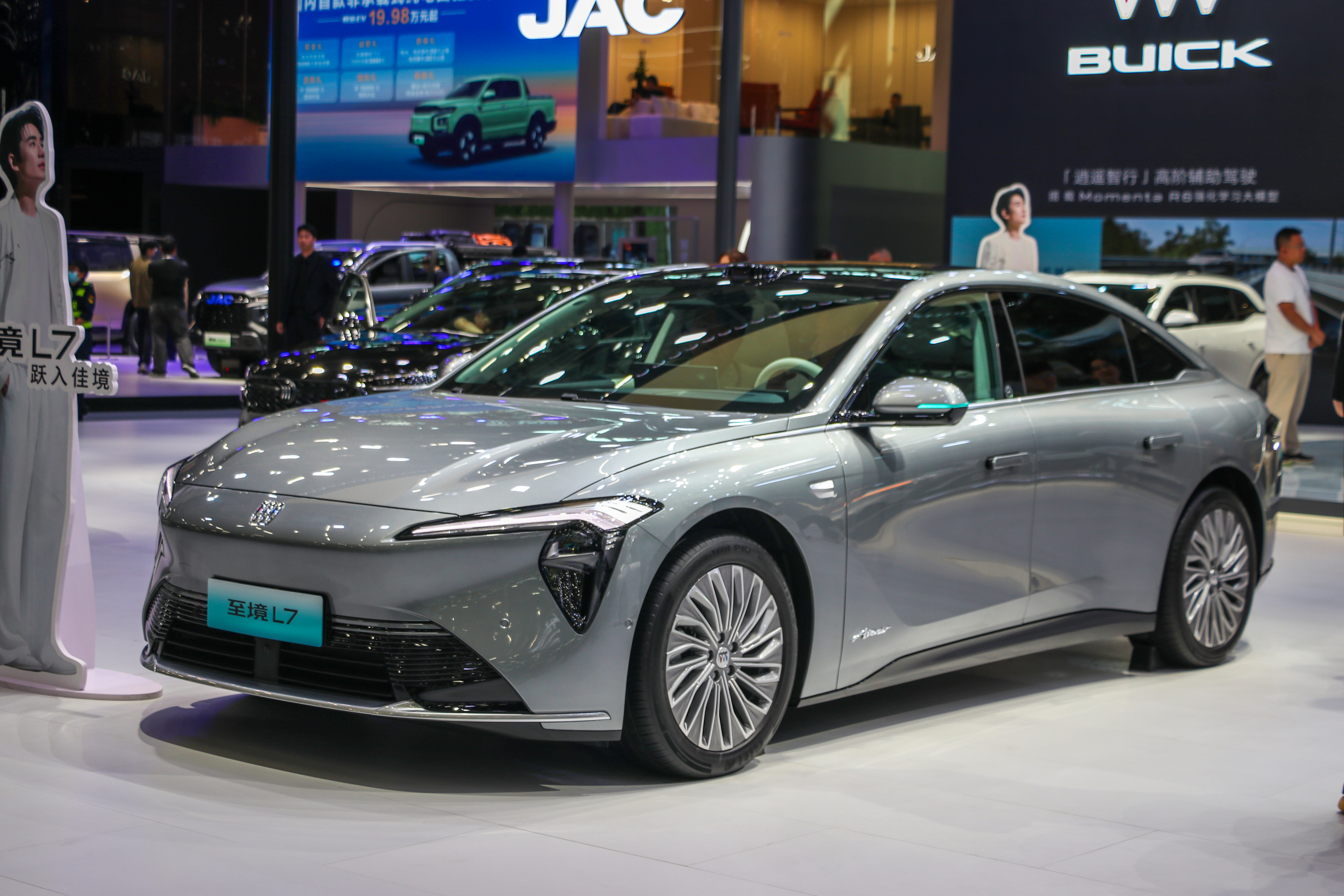
Electra L7

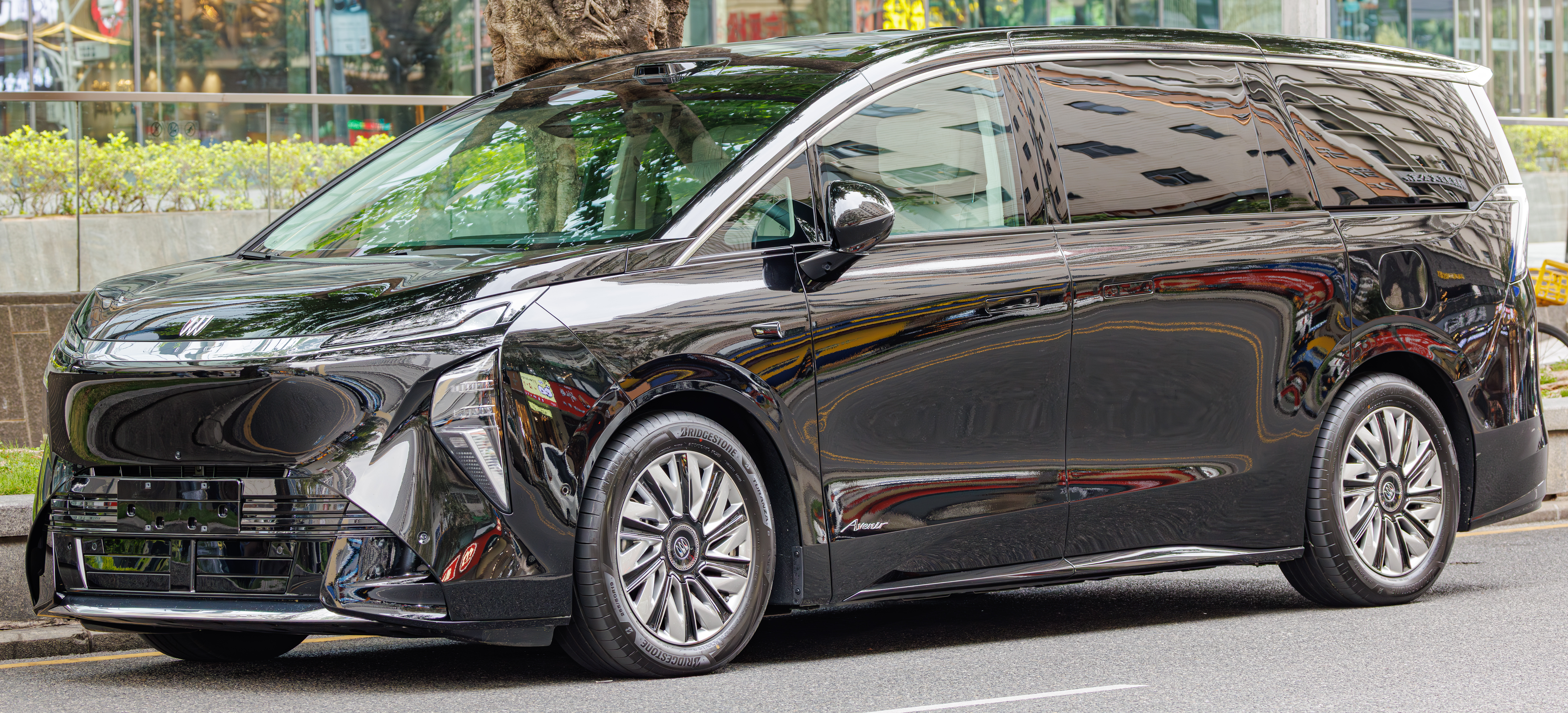
Electra Encasa

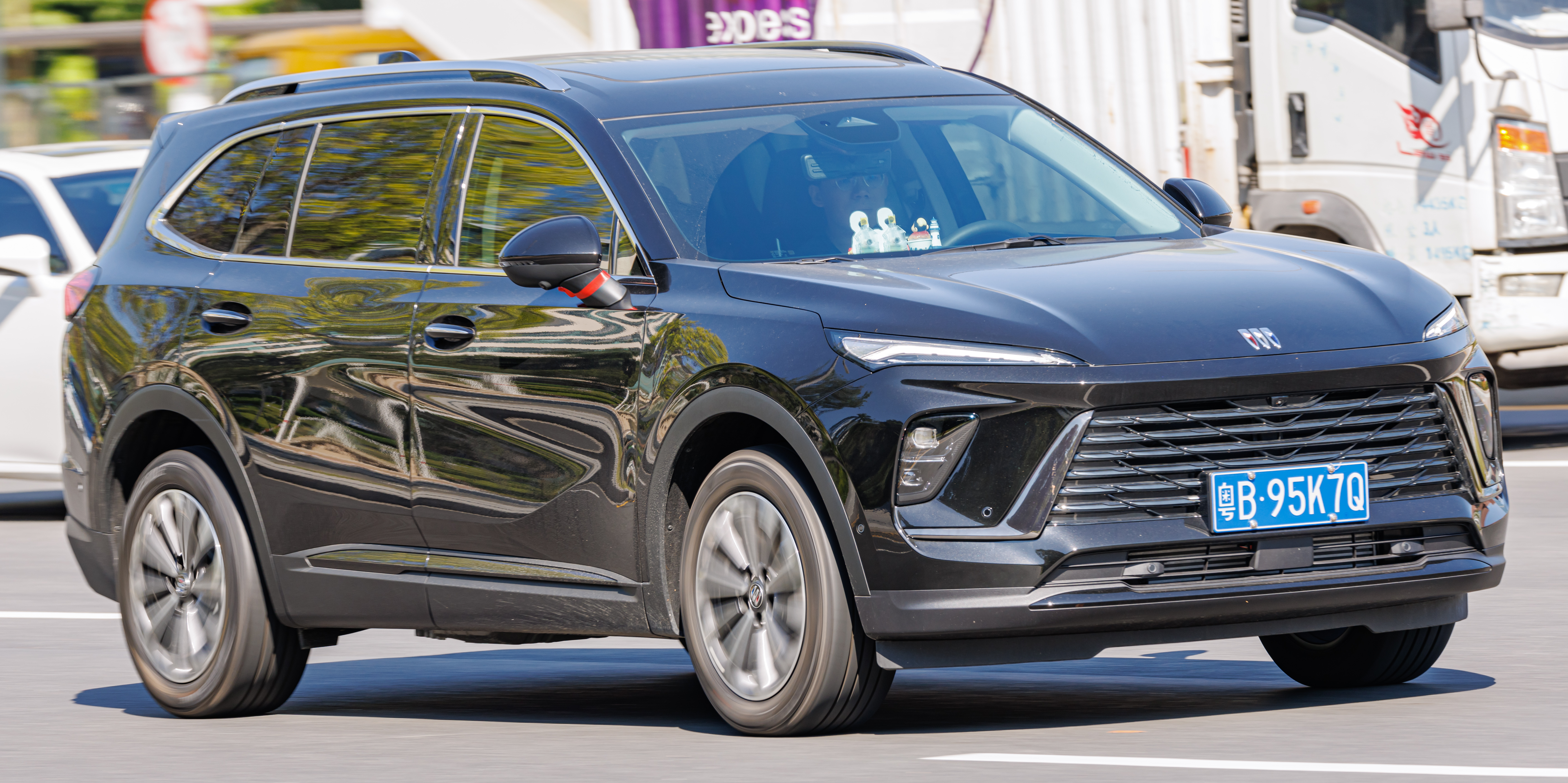
Envision Plus

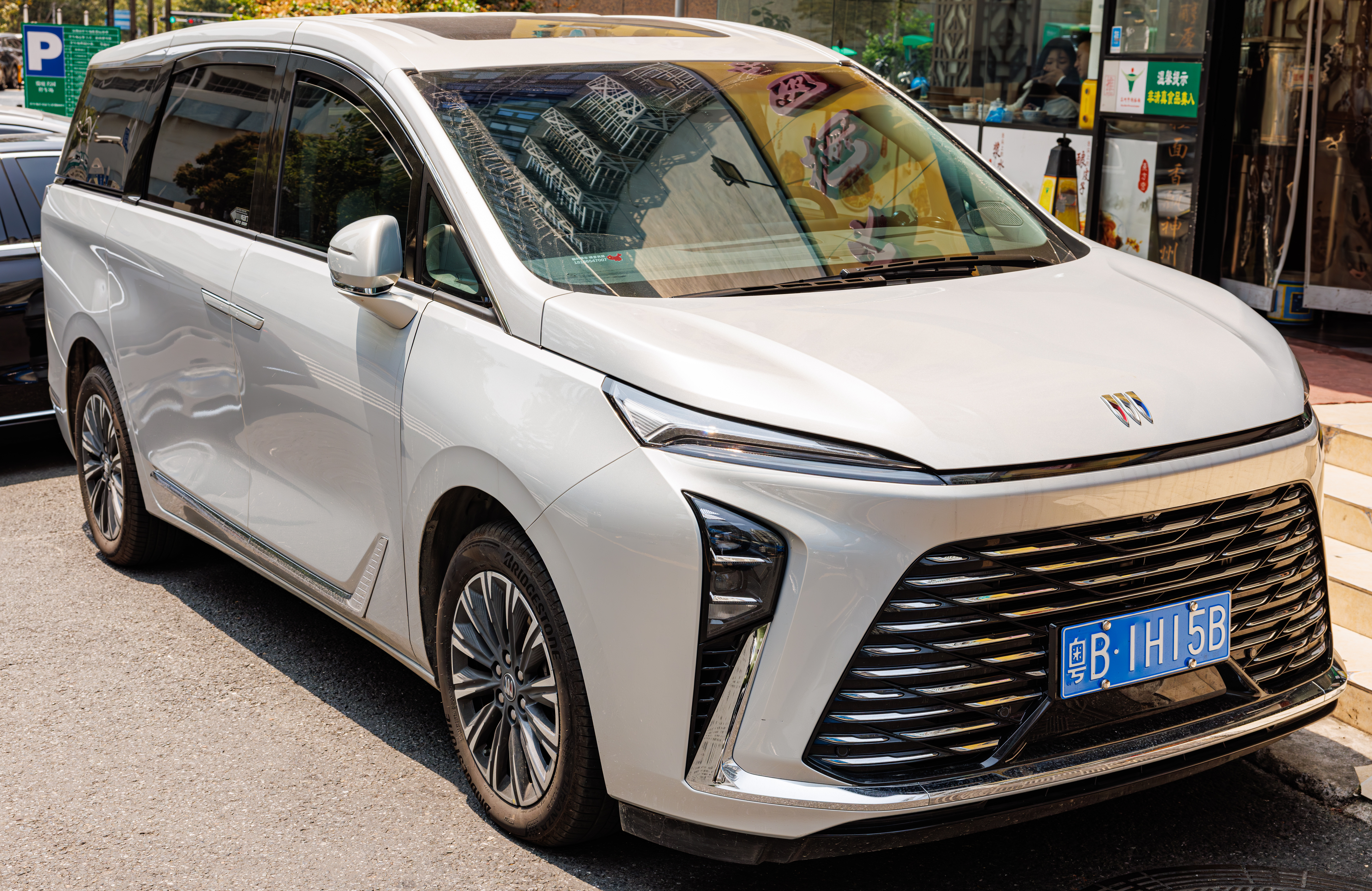
GL8 ES

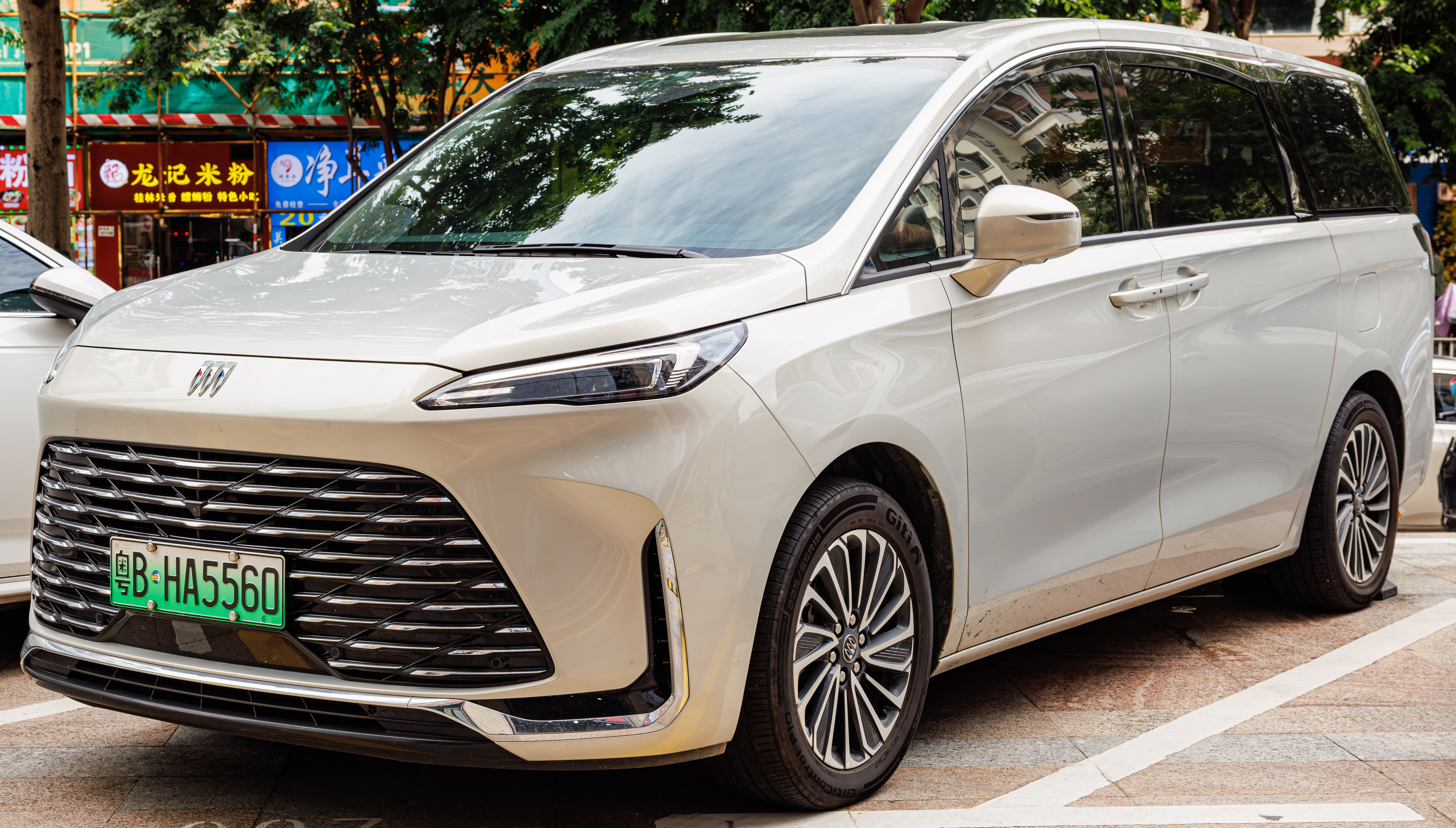
GL8 LS

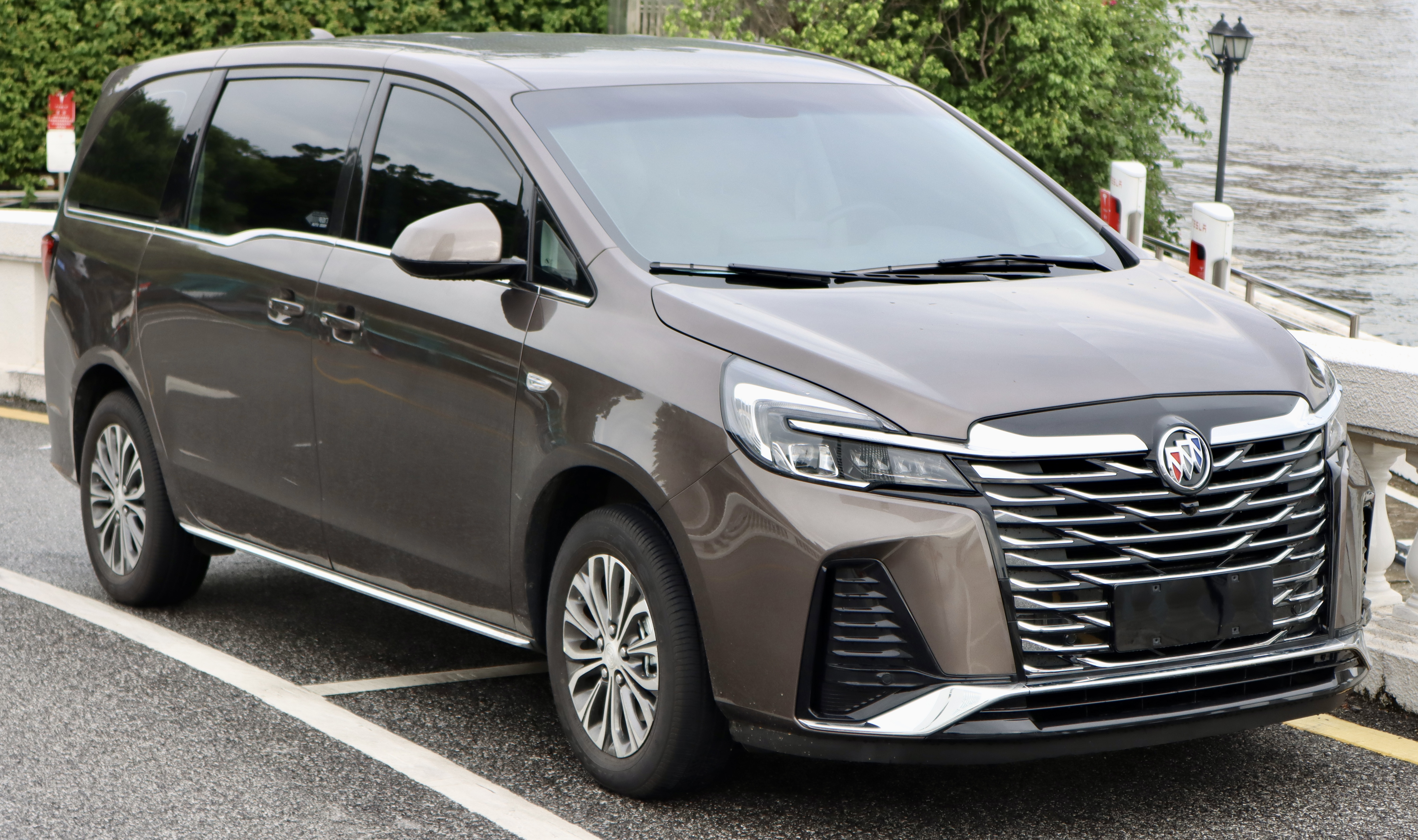
GL8 Land Business

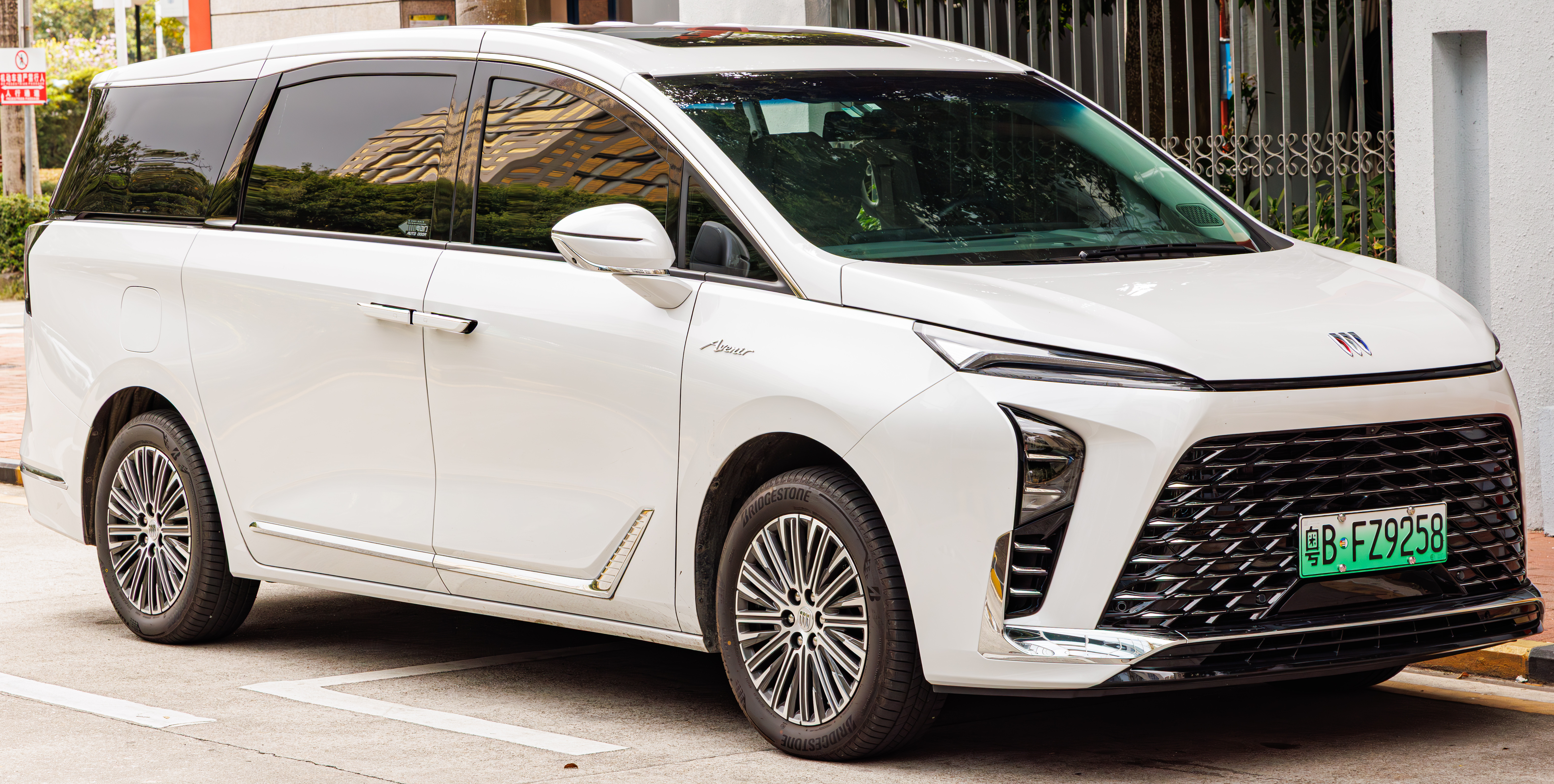
GL8 ES PHEV

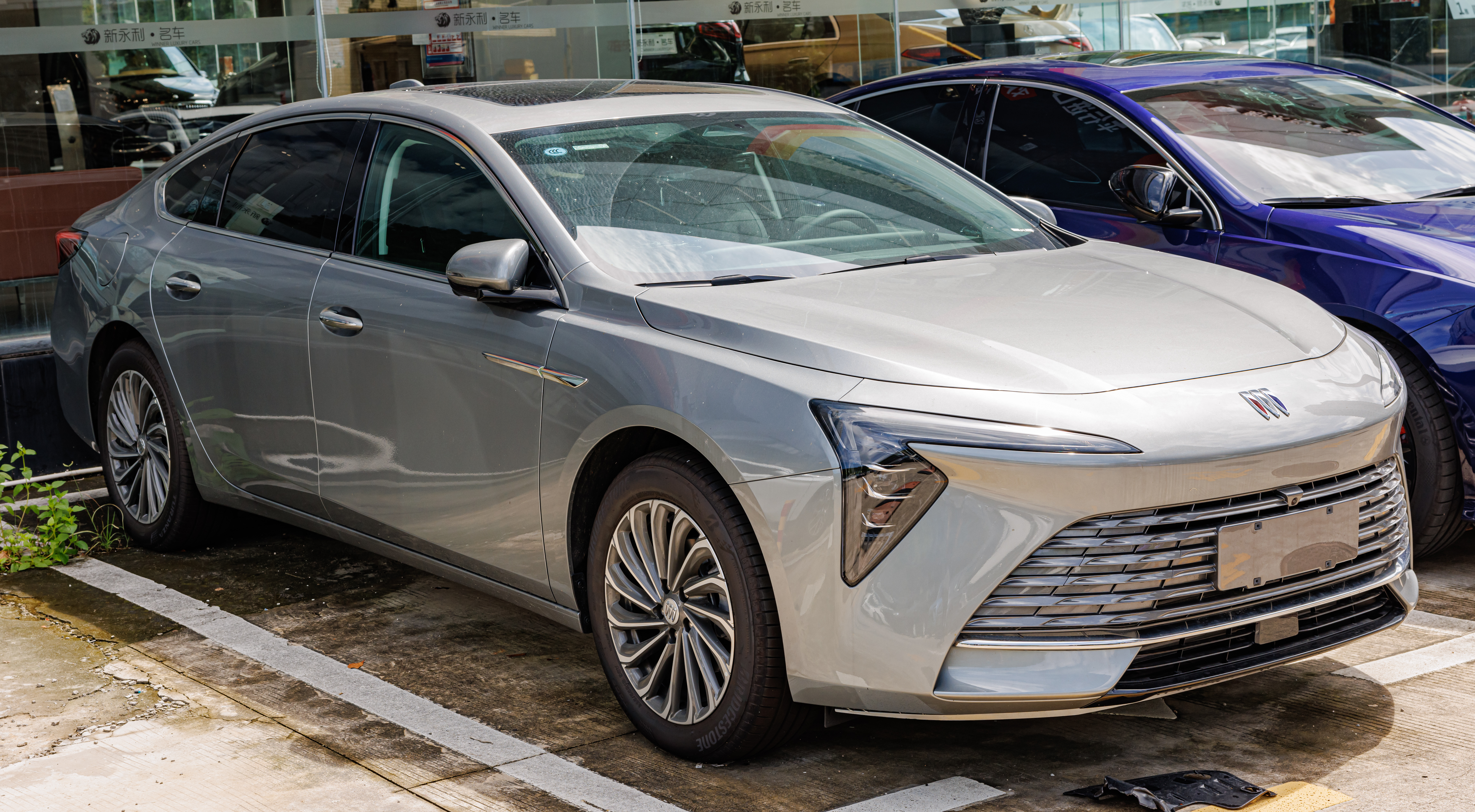
LaCrosse

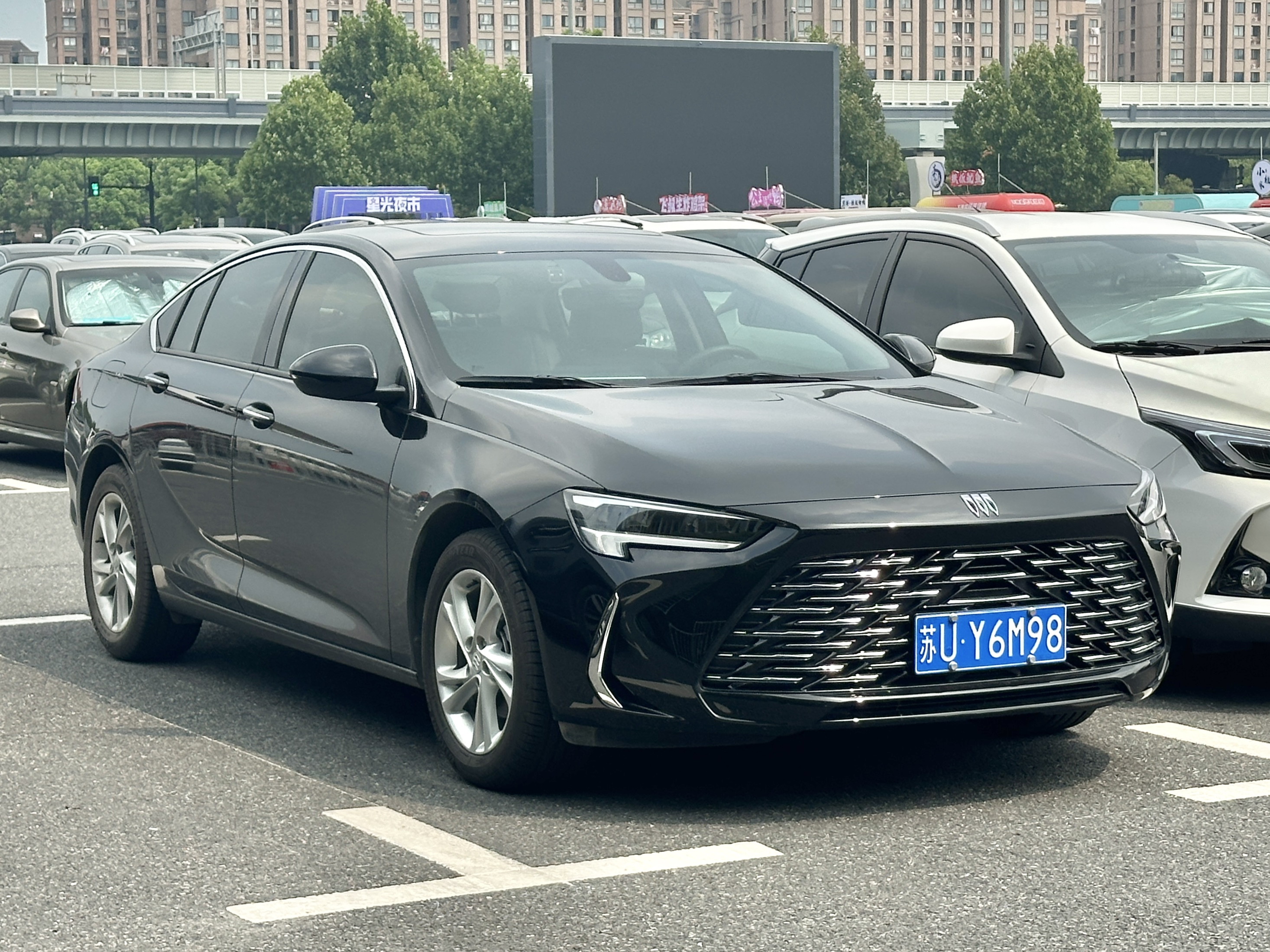
Regal

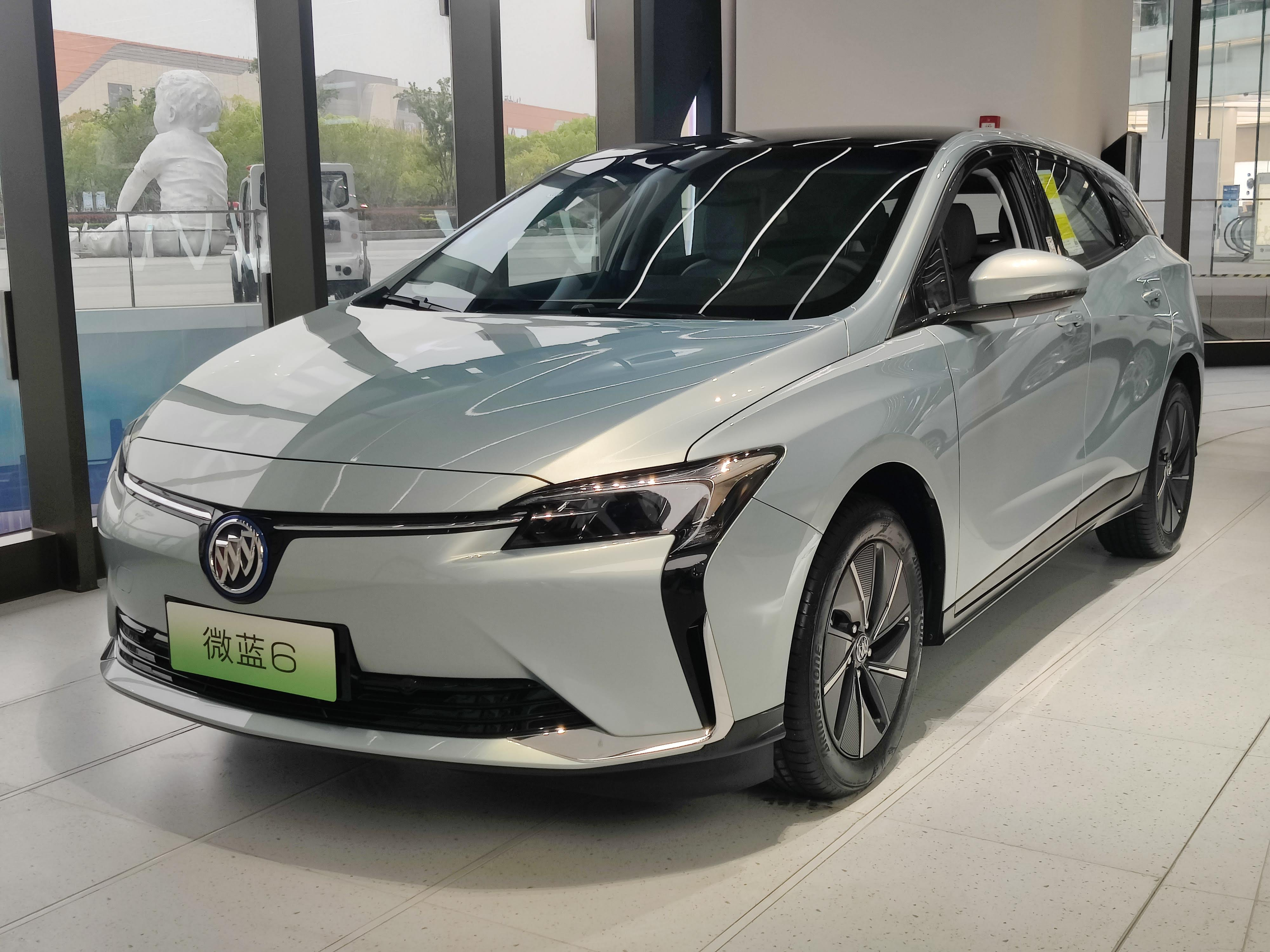
Velite 6

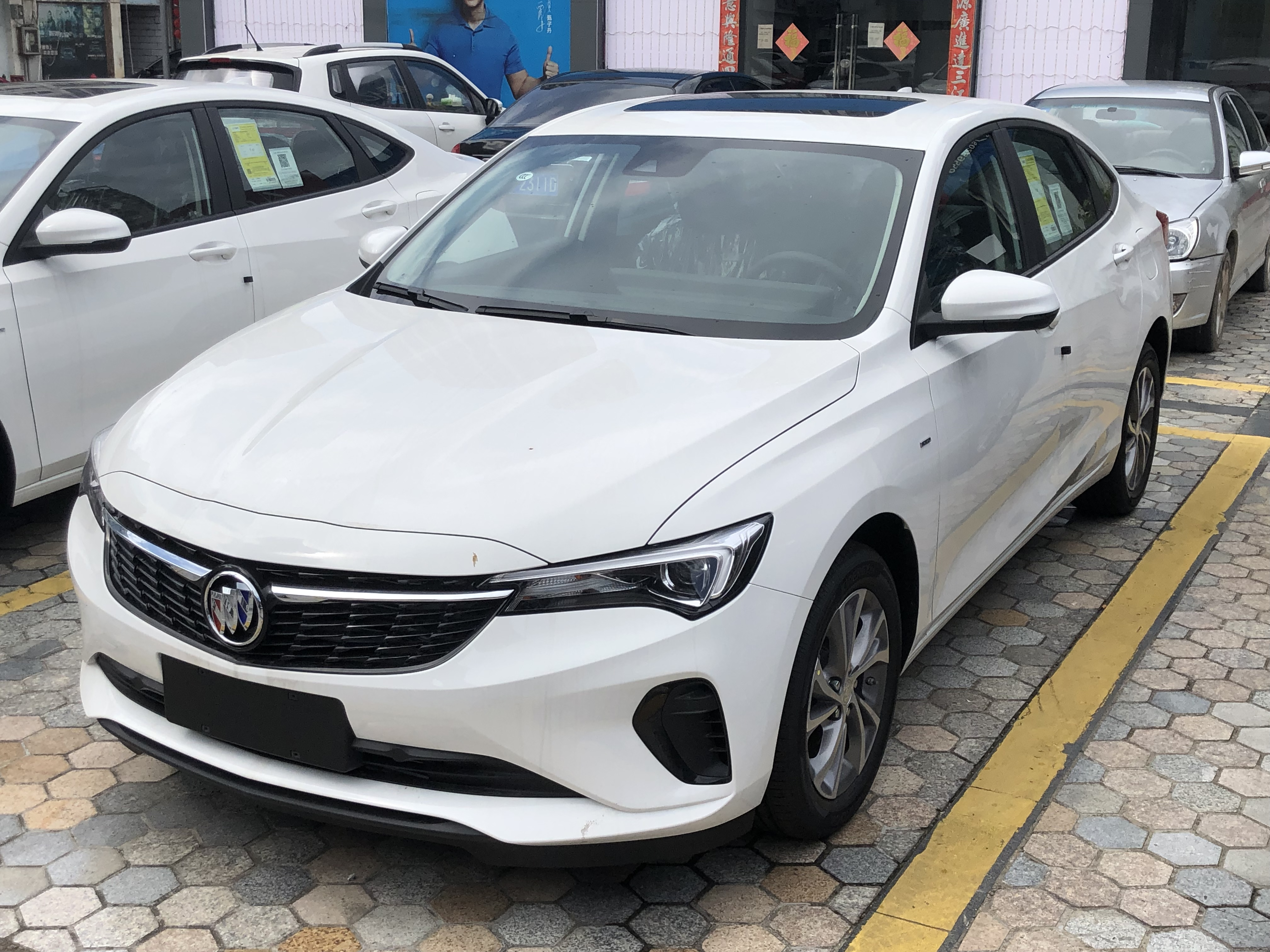
Verano
Current lineup (North America)

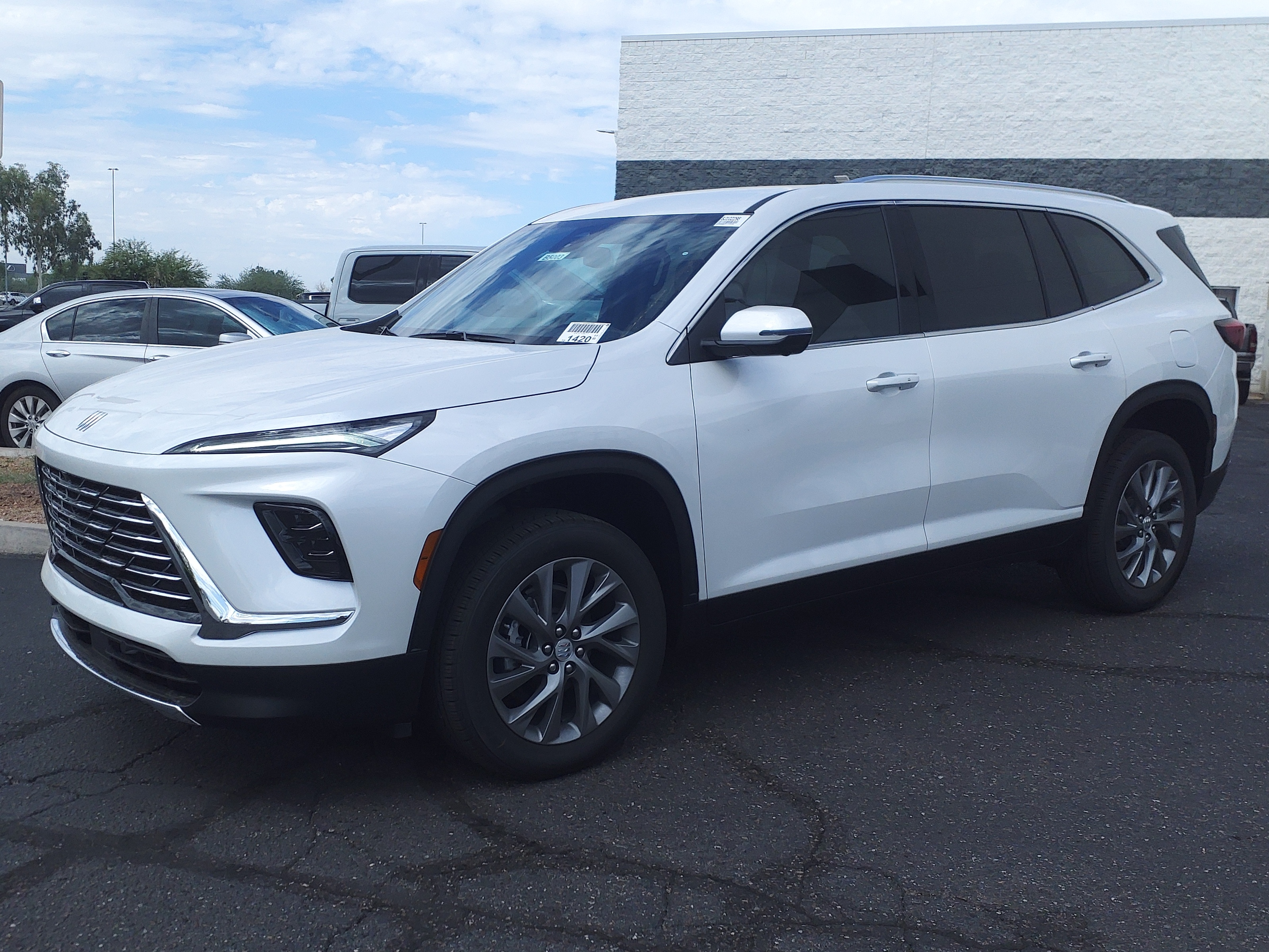
Enclave

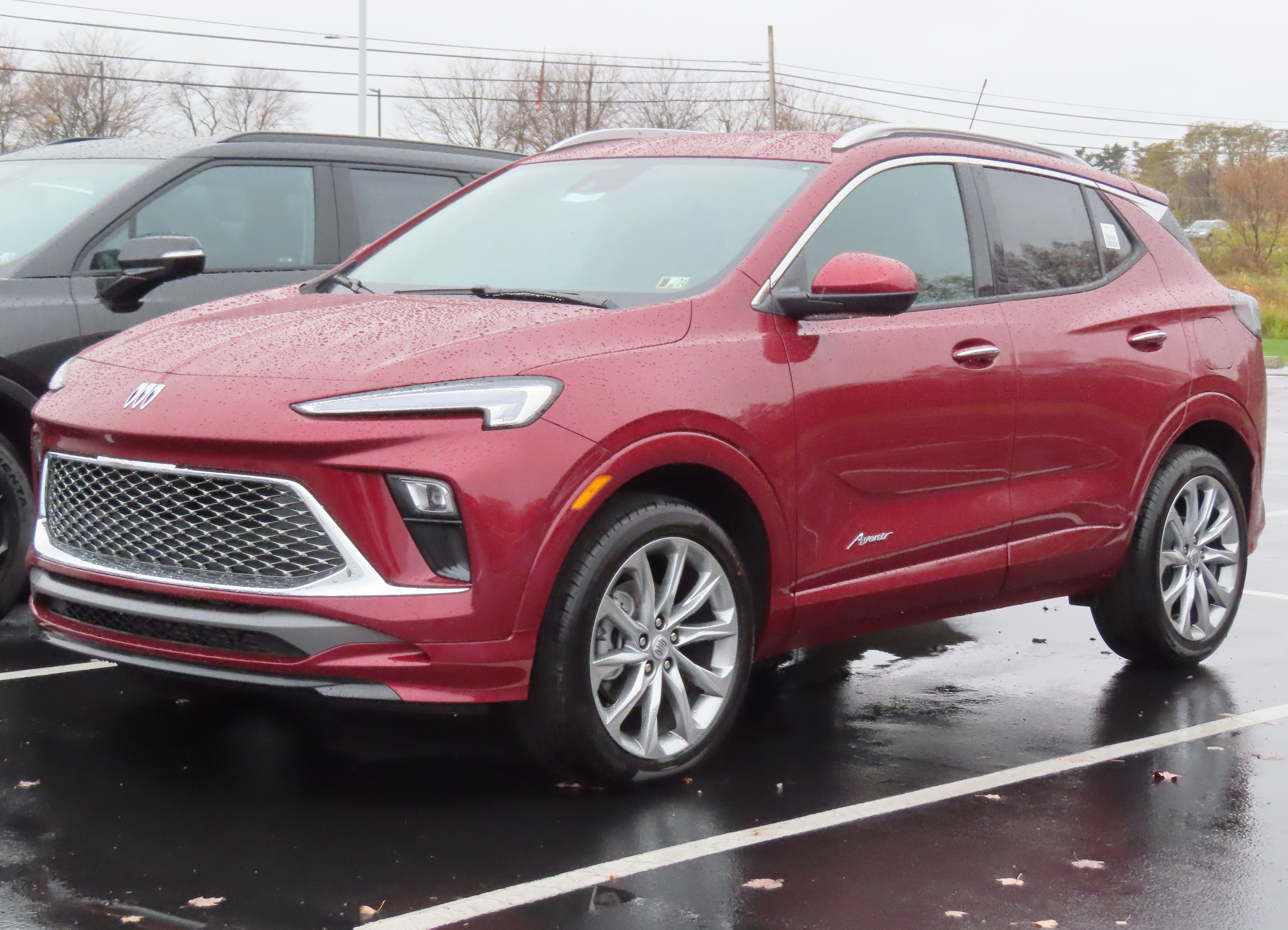
Encore GX

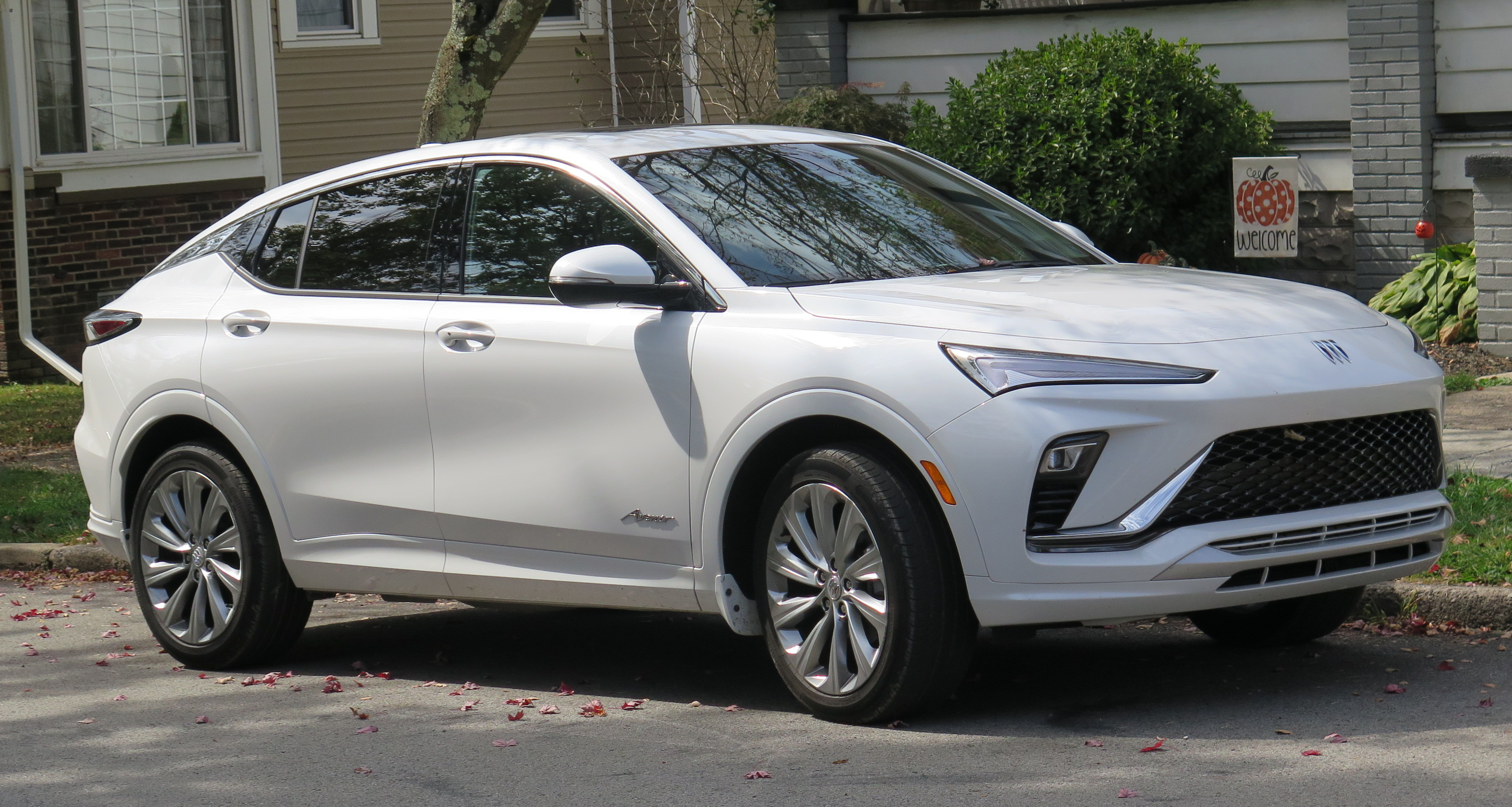
Envista

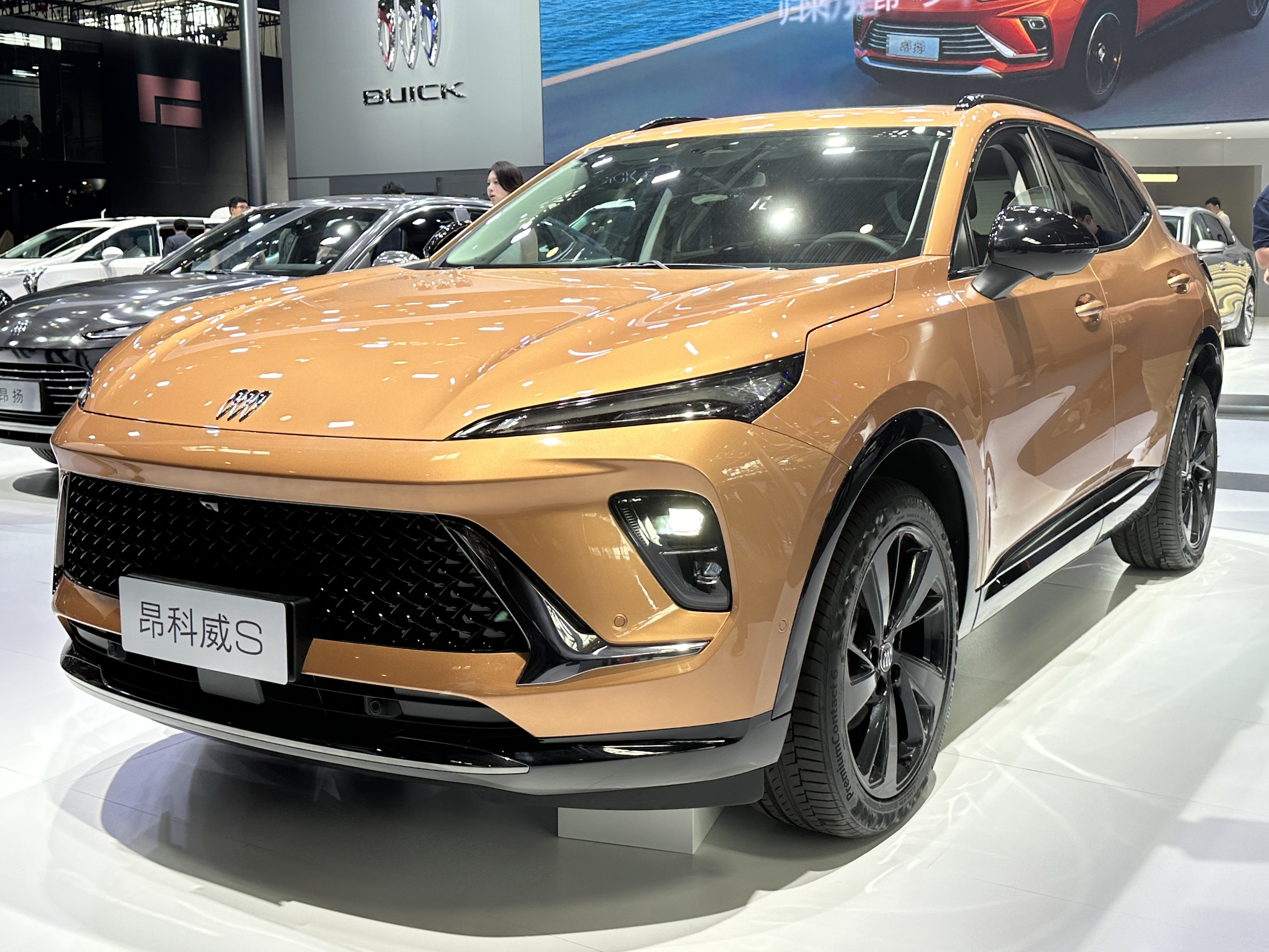
Envision

=== Past ===
- Buick Runabout: featured in a significant New York State legal case as a result of a wooden wheel collapsing.
- Model B (1904)
- Model C (1905)
- Model D (1907–1908)
- Model F & G (1906–1910)
- Model K (1907–1908)
- Model 10 (1908–1910)
- Model S (1907–1908)
- Model 5 (1908)
- Model 14 & 14B (1910–1911)
- Model 16 (1909-1910)
- Model 17 (1909-1910)
- Model 19 (1910)
- Model 28, 29, 34, 36 & 43 (1912)
- Model 35 (1912)
- Model 24, 25, 30, 31 & 40 (1913)
- Series B (1914)
- Series C (1915)
- Series D (1916–1917)
- Series E (1918)
- Series H (1919)
- Series K (1920)
- Series 21 (1921)
- Series 22 (1922)
- Series 23 (1923)
- Series 24 (1924)
- Master Series (1925–1928)
- Standard Series (1925–1928)
- Series 116, 121 & 129 (1929)
- Series 40 (1930–1935)
- Series 50 (1930–1935)
- Series 60 (1930–1935)
- Special (1936–1958, 1961–1969)
- Roadmaster (1936–1958, 1991–1996)
- Century (1936–1942, 1954–1958, 1973–2005)
- Super (1939–1958)
- Skylark (1953–1954, 1961–1972, 1975–1998)
- Invicta (1959–1963)
- Electra (1959–1990)
- LeSabre (1959–2005)
- Wildcat (1963–1970)
- Riviera (1963–1993, 1995–1999)
- Estate (1970–1979, 1990)
- Centurion (1971–1973)
- Apollo (1973–1975)
- Skyhawk (1975–1980, 1982–1989)
- Opel (1976–1979)
- Somerset (1985–1987)
- Reatta (1988–1991)
- Park Avenue (1991–2005, 2007–2012)
- Sail (2001–2004)
- Rendezvous (2001–2007)
- Excelle (2003–2023)
- Rainier (2004–2007)
- Royaum (2005–2006)
- Terraza (2005–2007)
- Lucerne (2006–2011)
- Excelle GT (2010–2023)
- Excelle XT (2010–2015)
- Encore (2013–2022)
- Cascada (2016–2019)
- Velite 5 (2017–2019)
- GL6 (2017–2023)
- Velite 7 (2020–2022)
- Enclave (China) (2020–2025)
- Electra E4 (2023–2025)
Past lineup

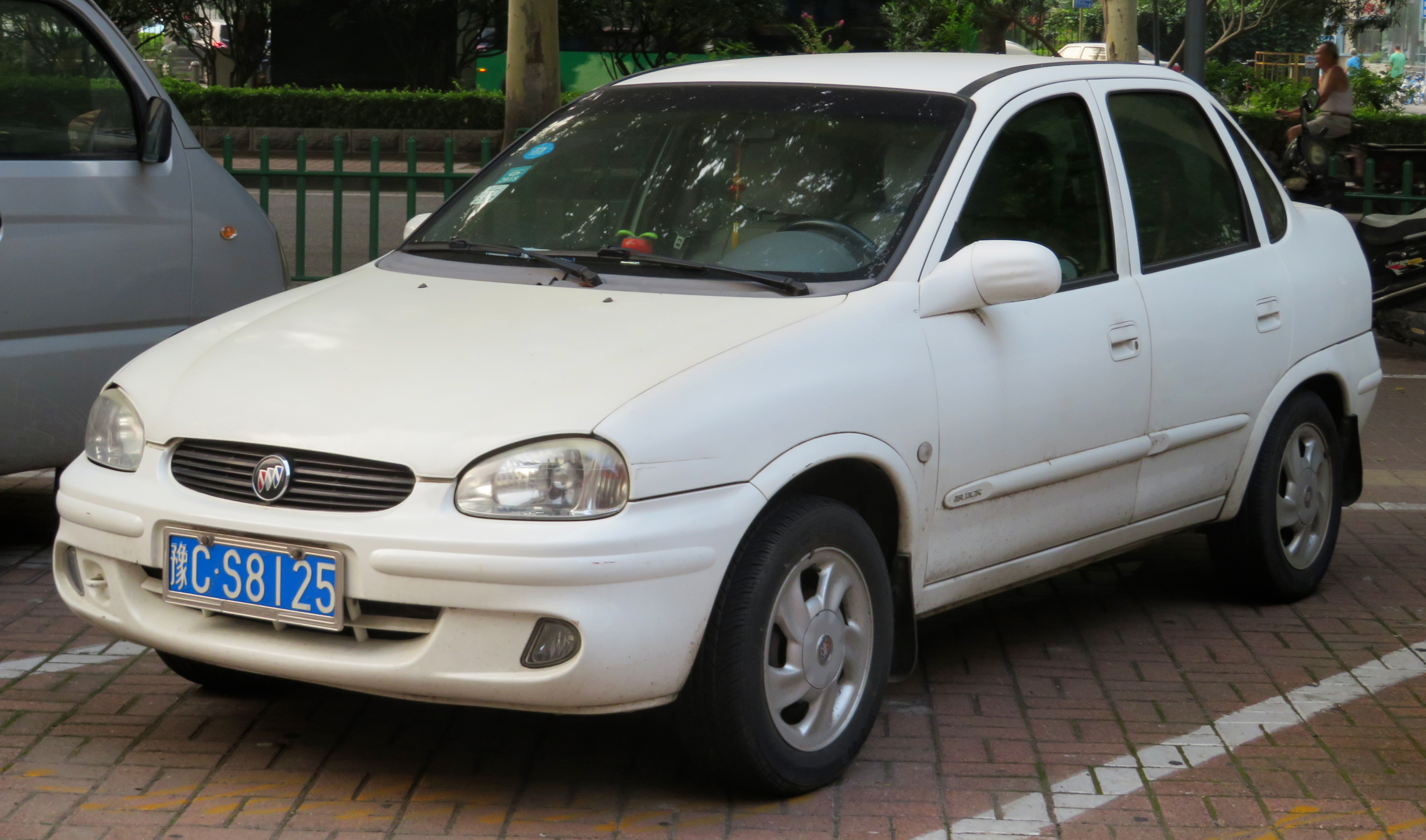
Sail

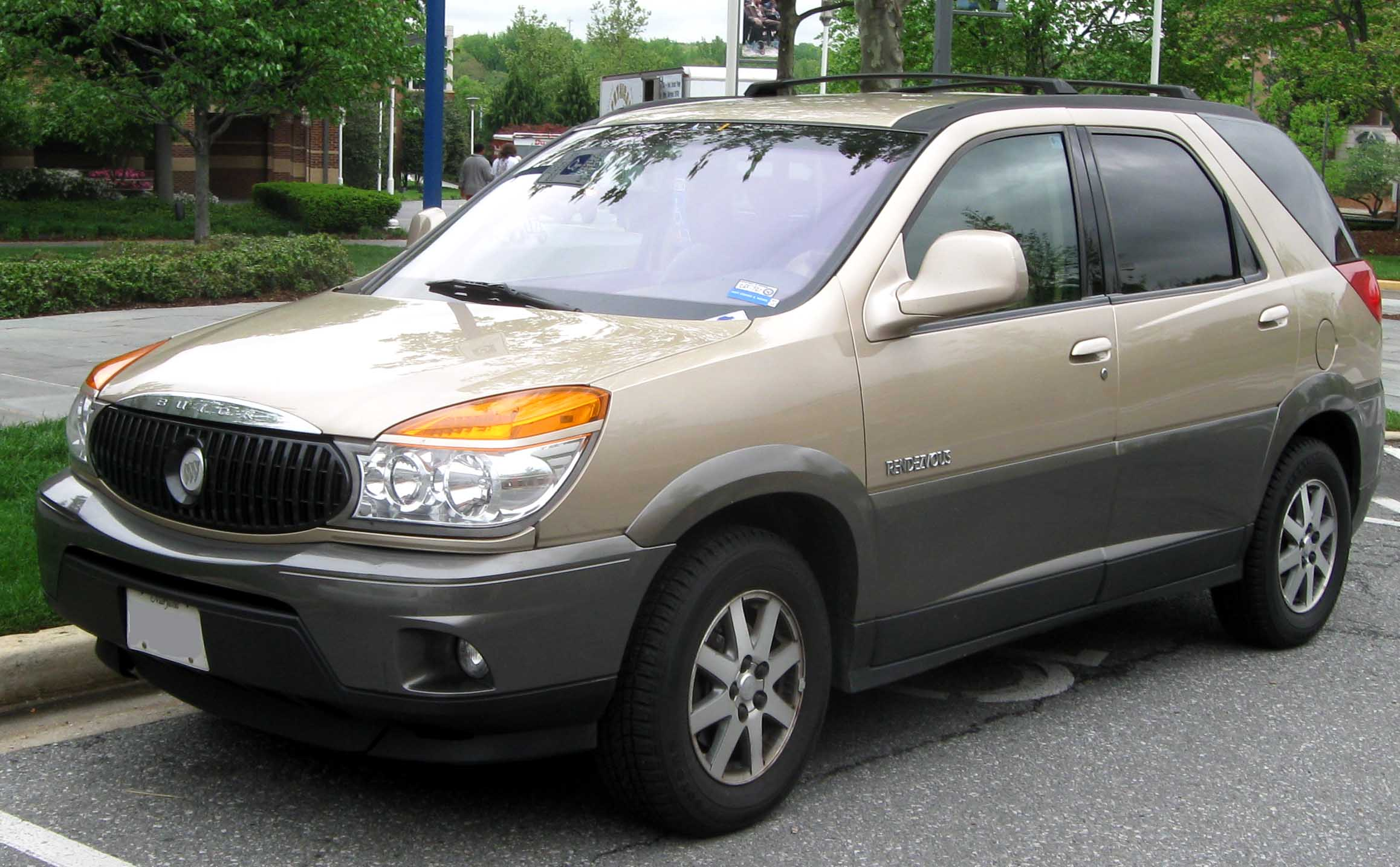
Rendezvous

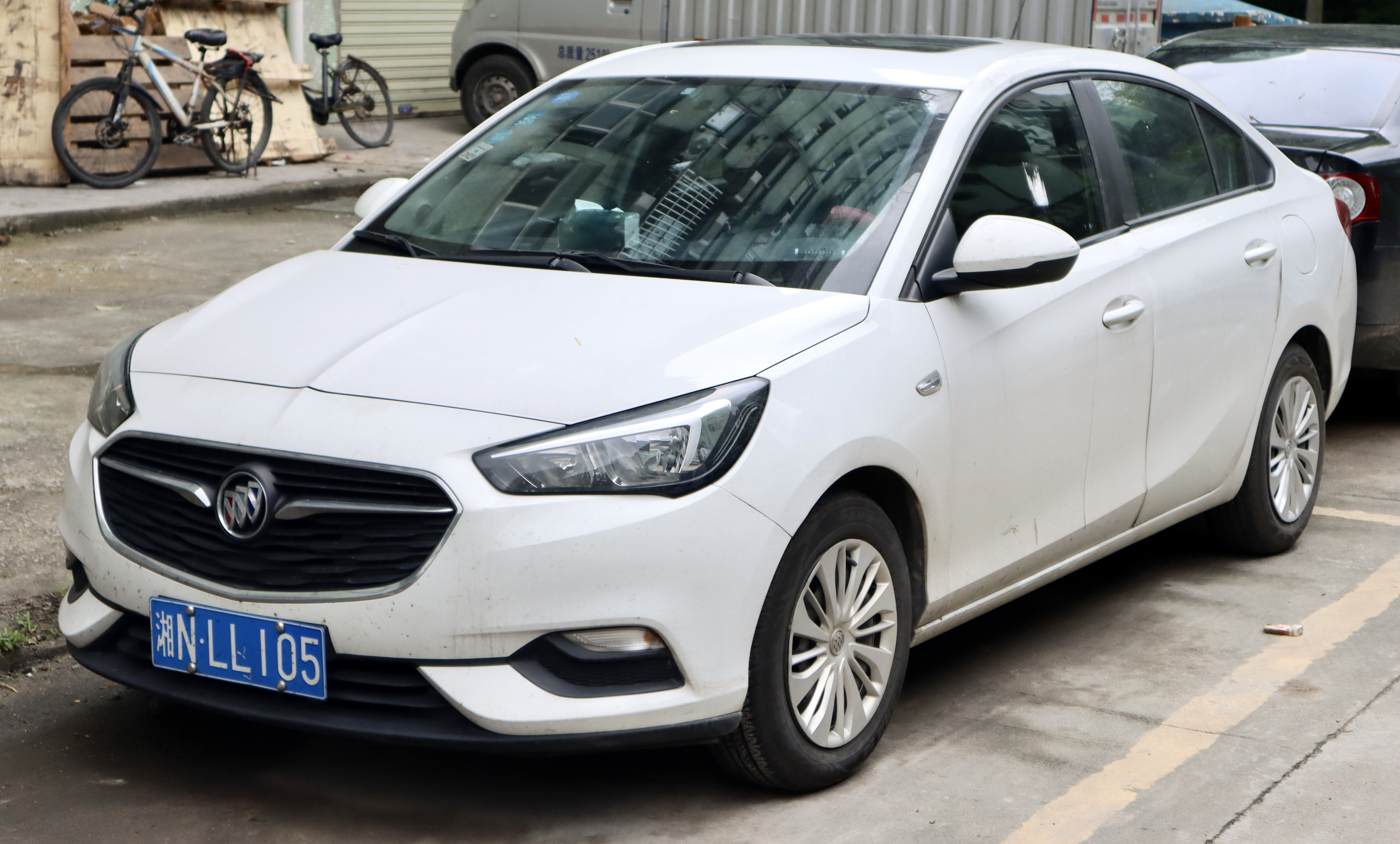
Excelle

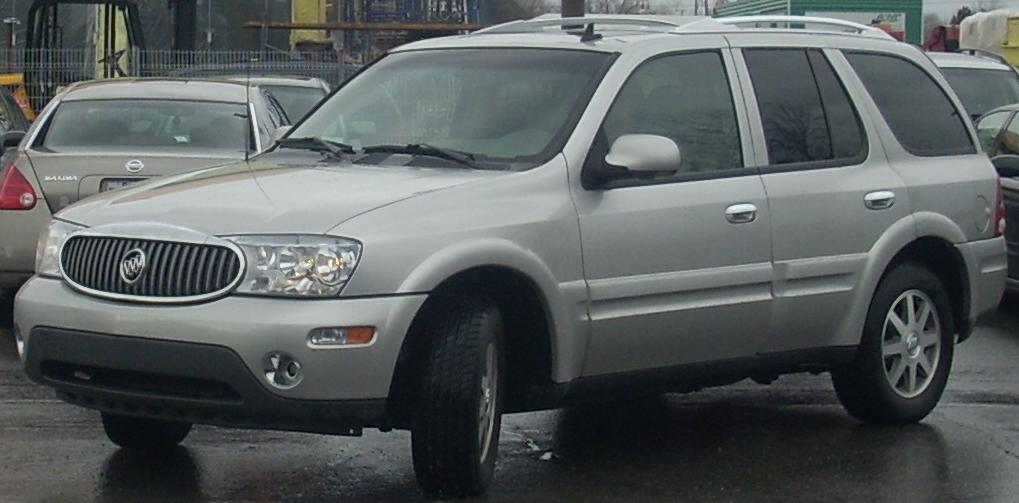
Rainier

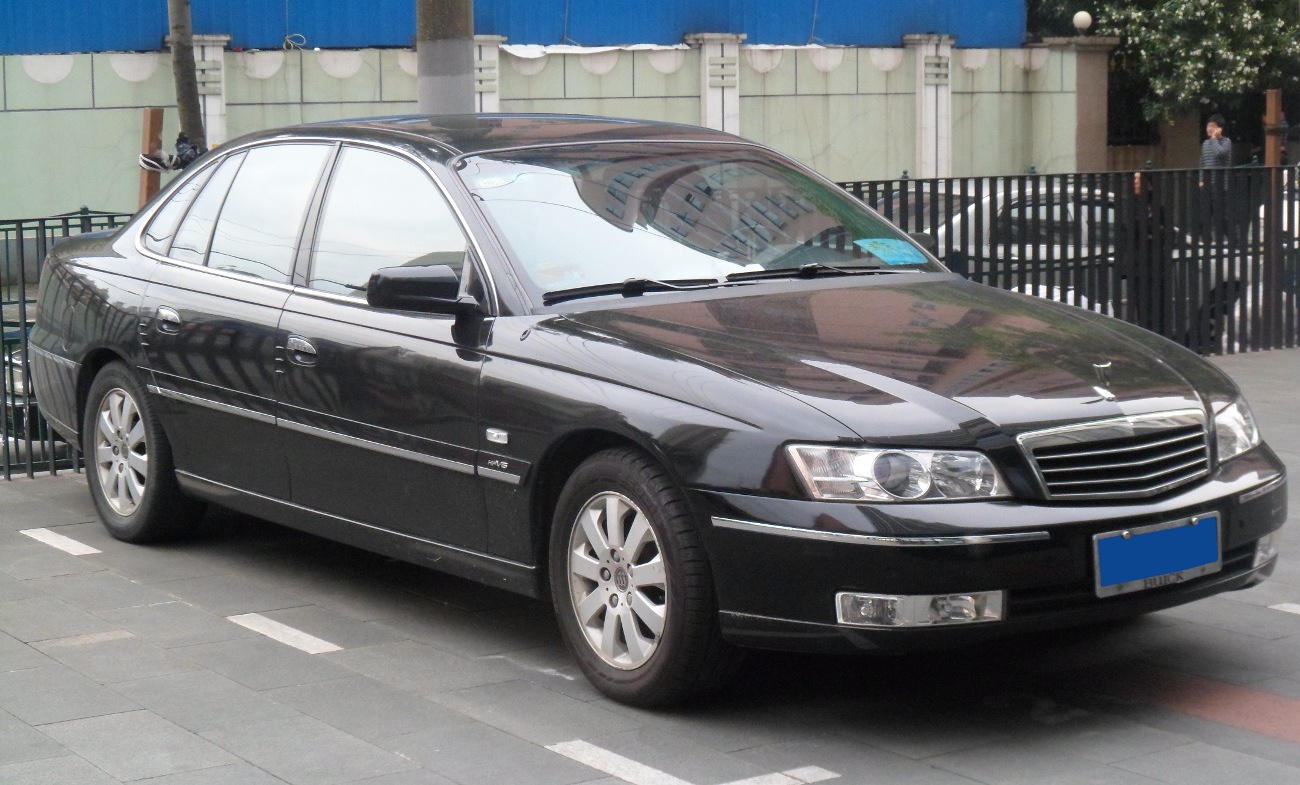
Royaum

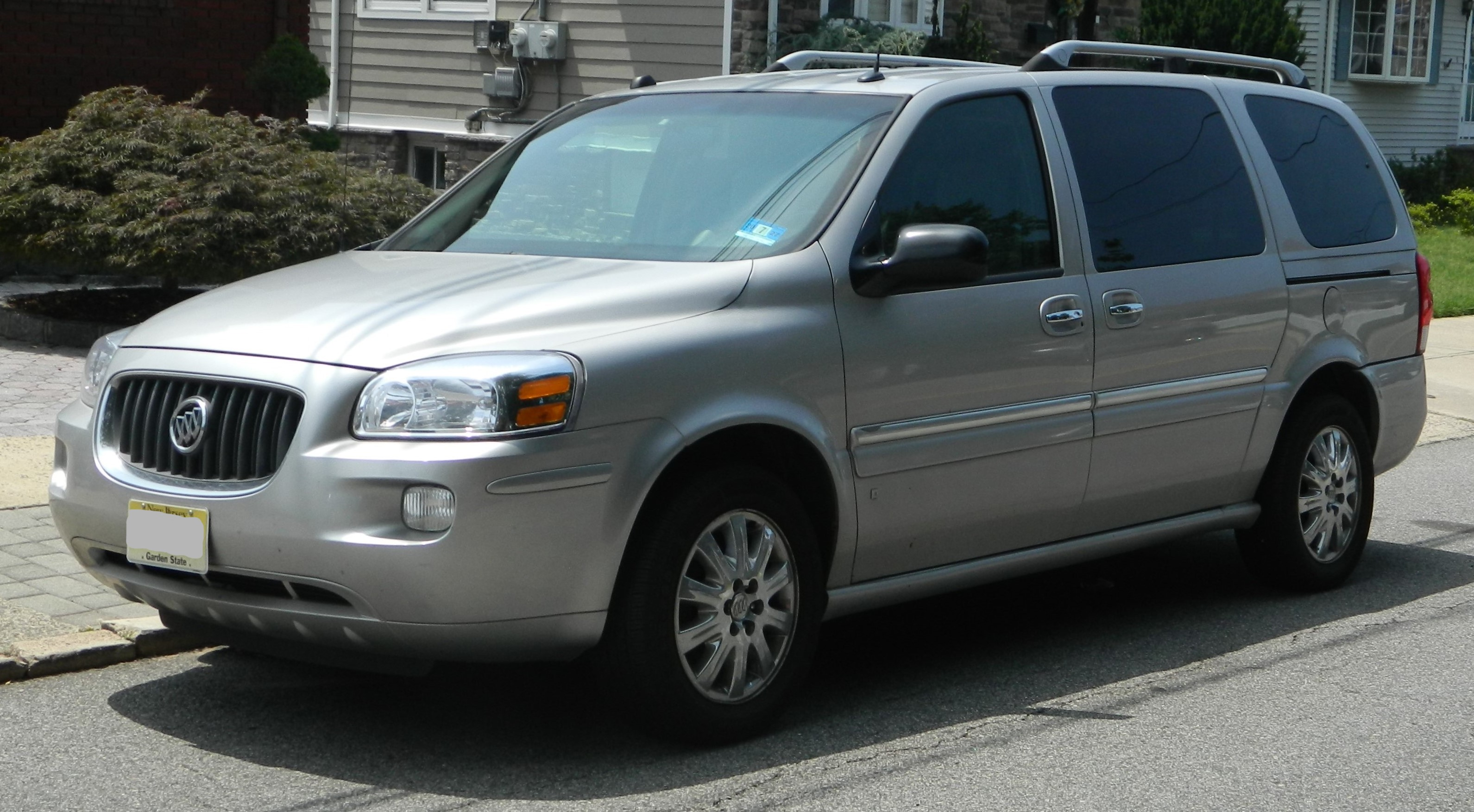
Terraza

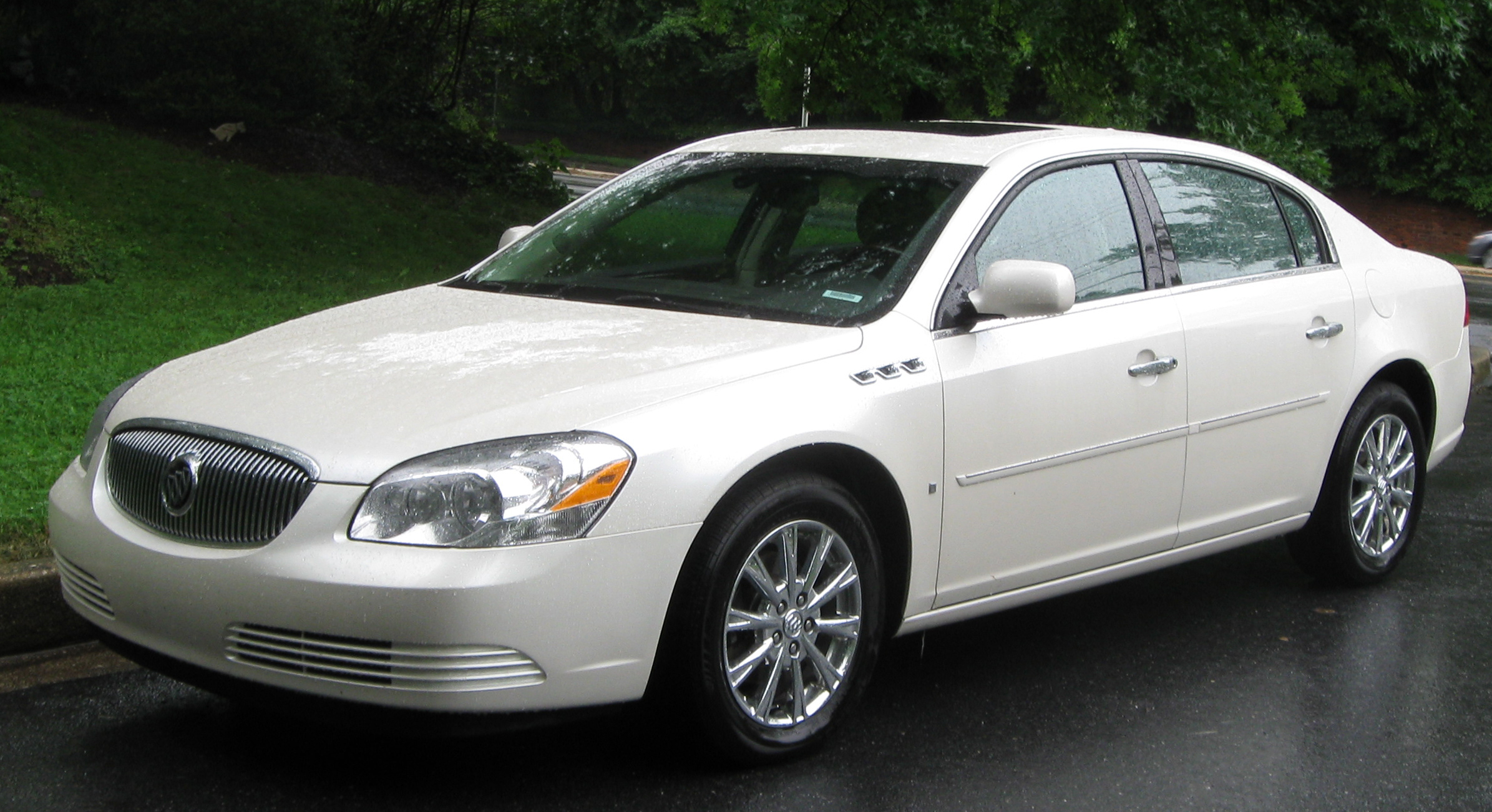
Lucerne

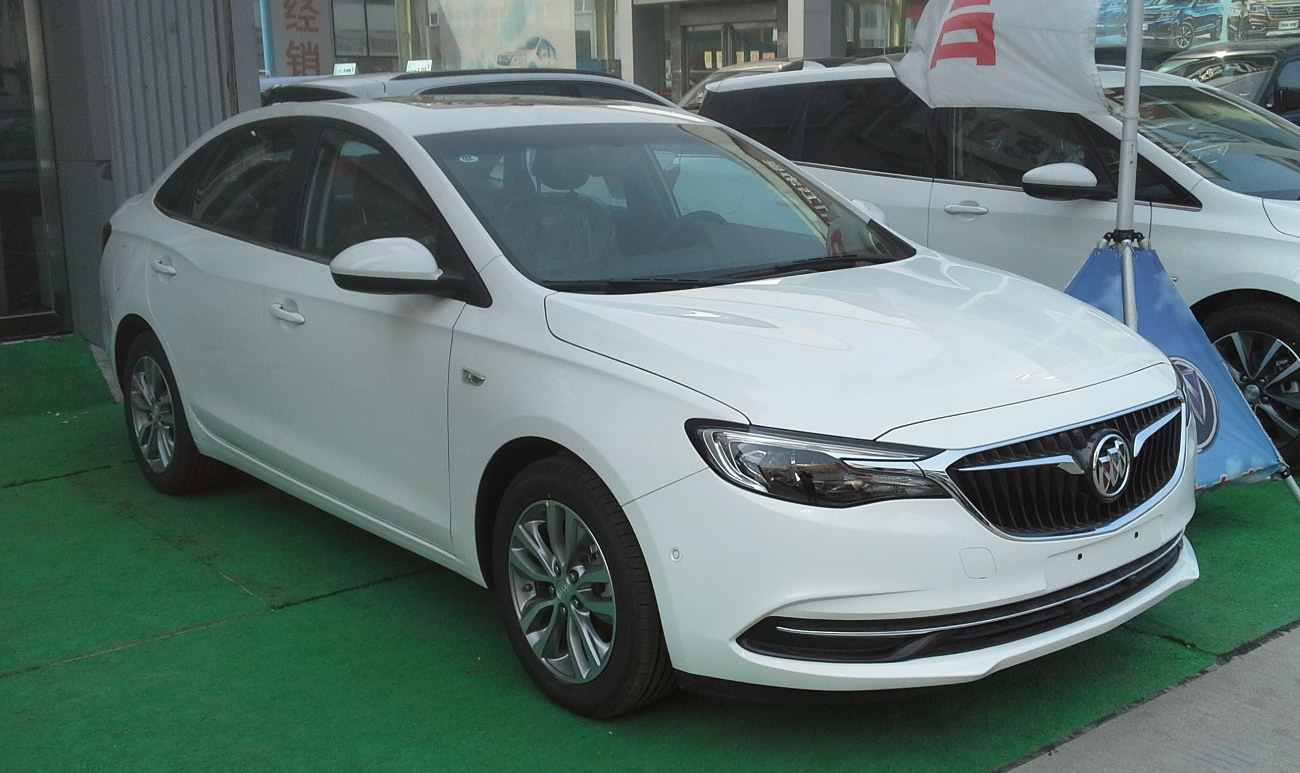
Excelle GT

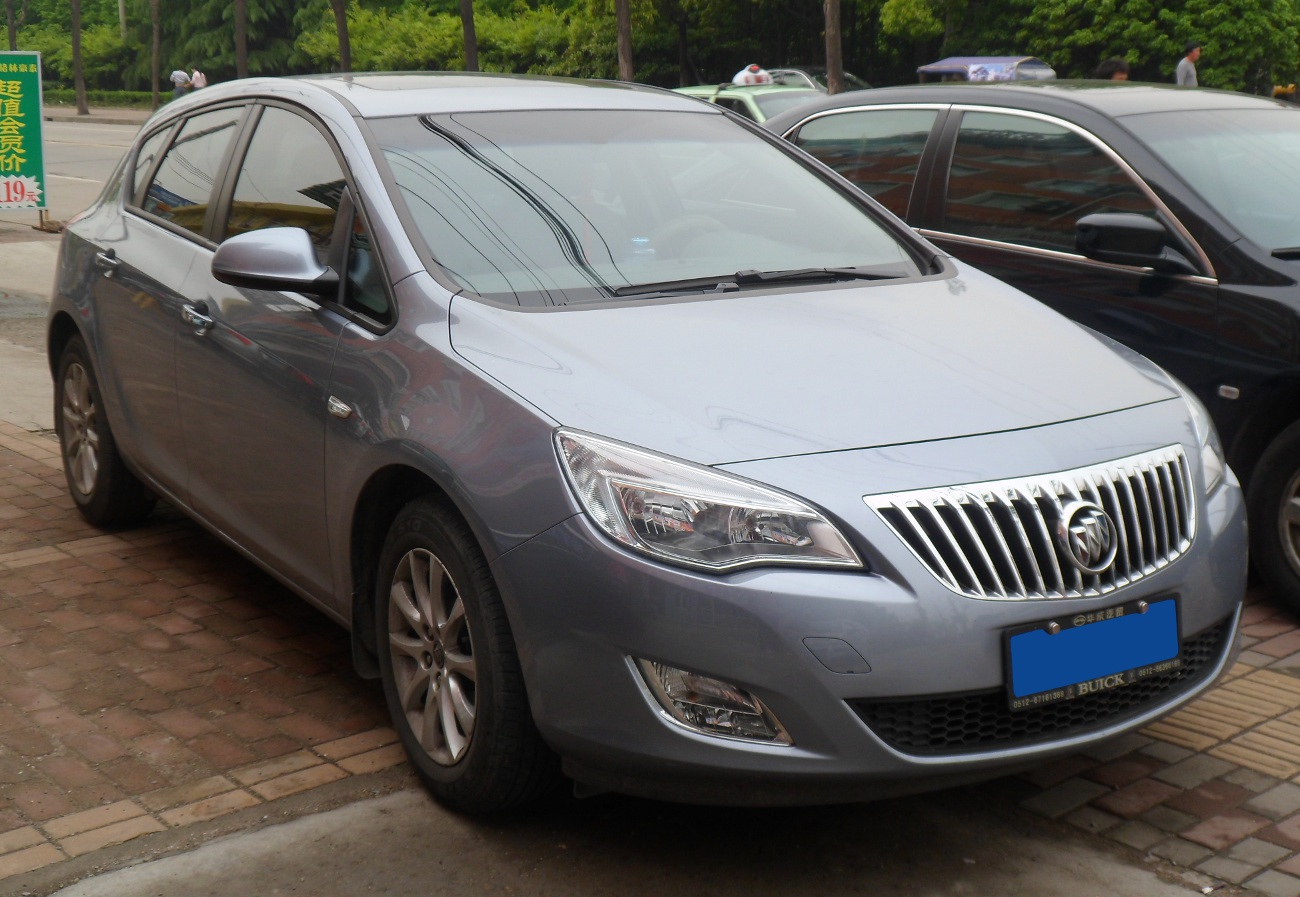
Excelle XT

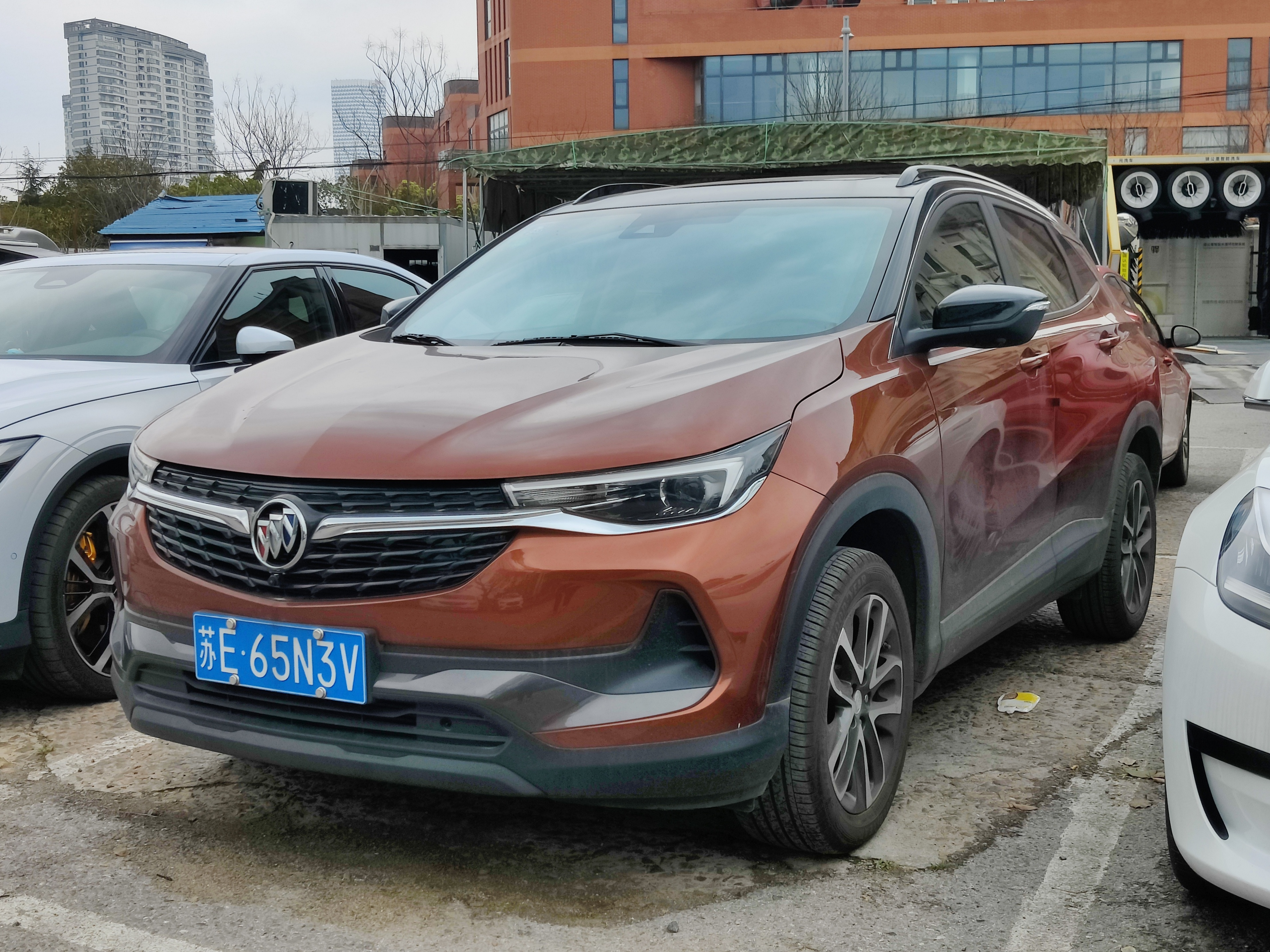
Encore

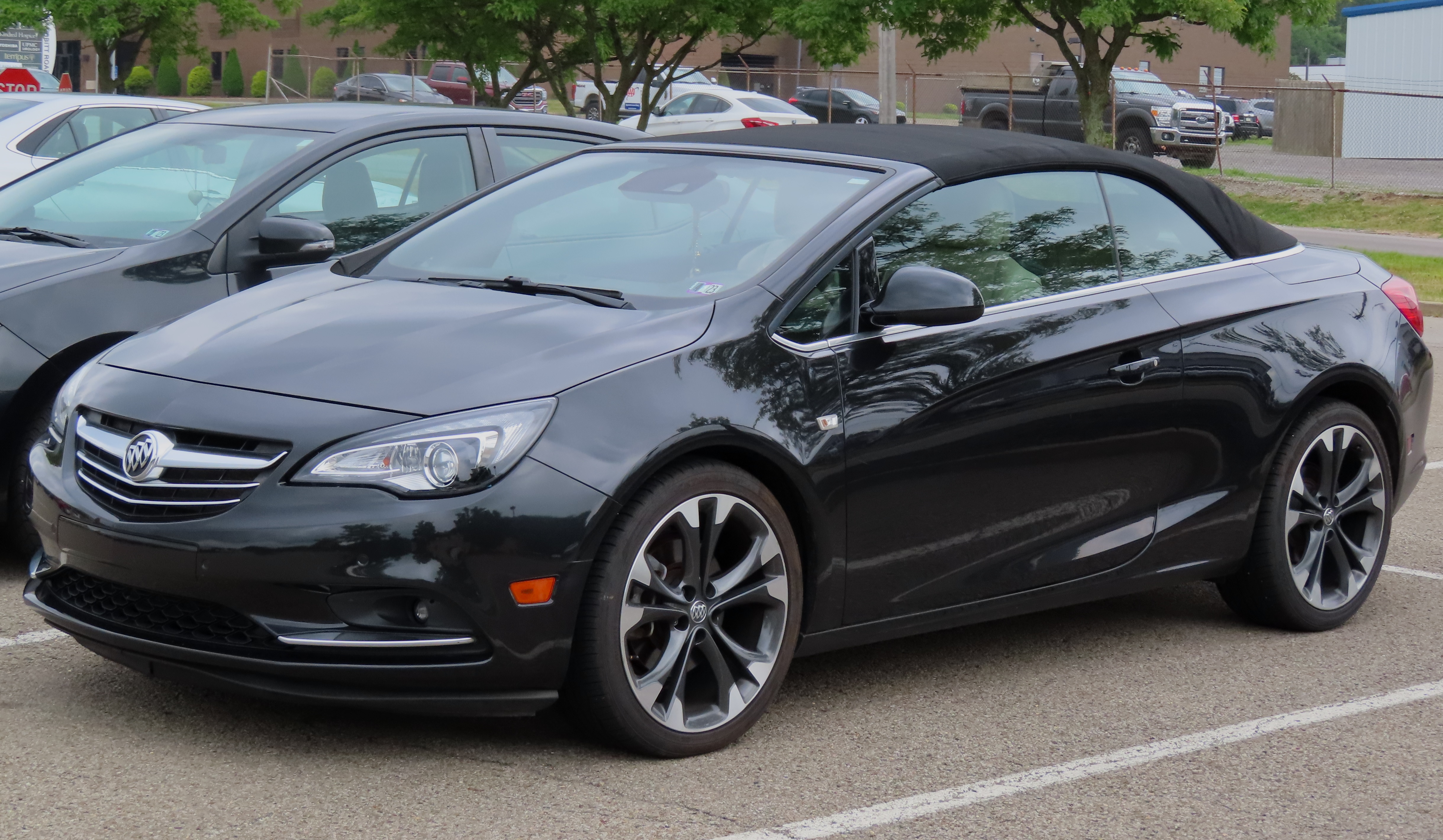
Cascada

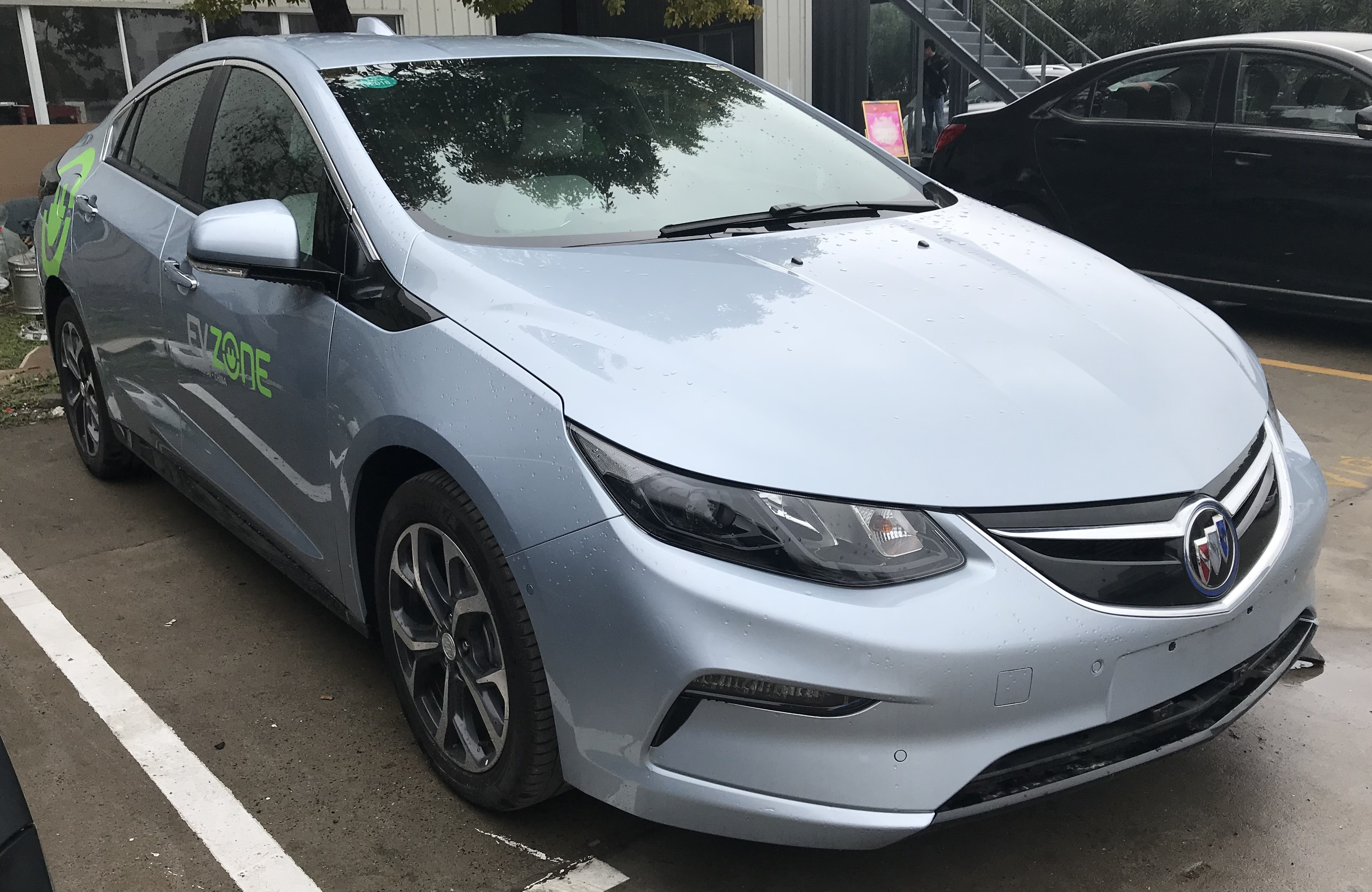
Velite 5

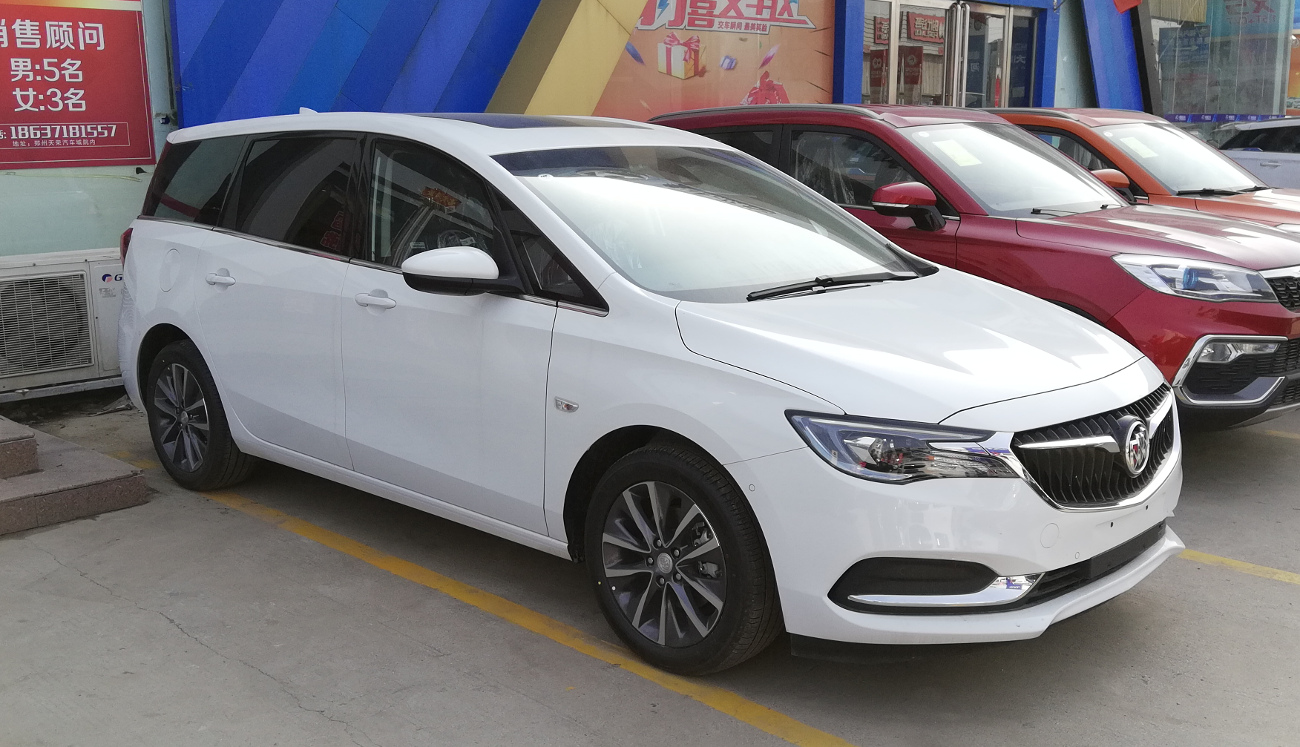
GL6

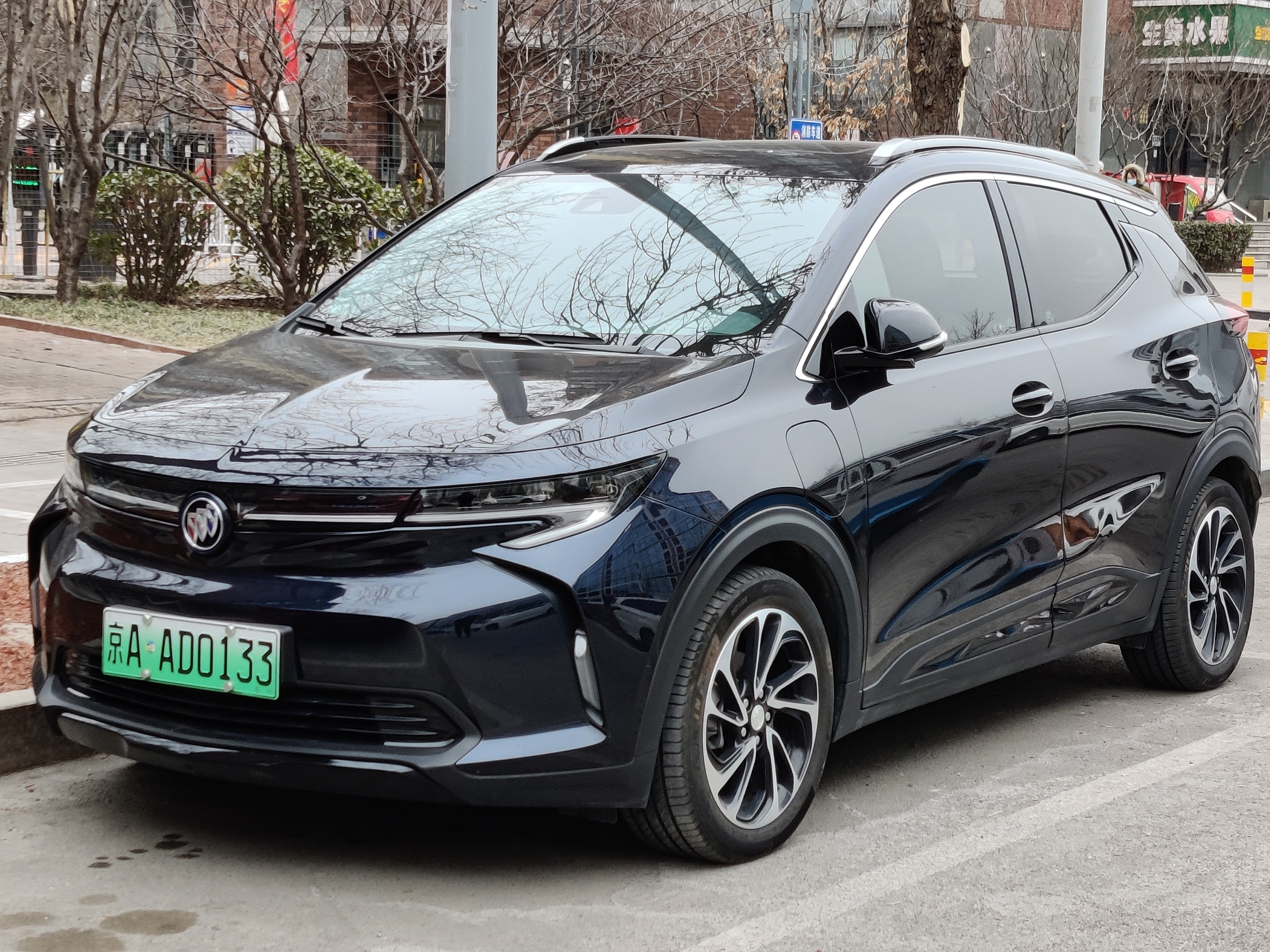
Velite 7

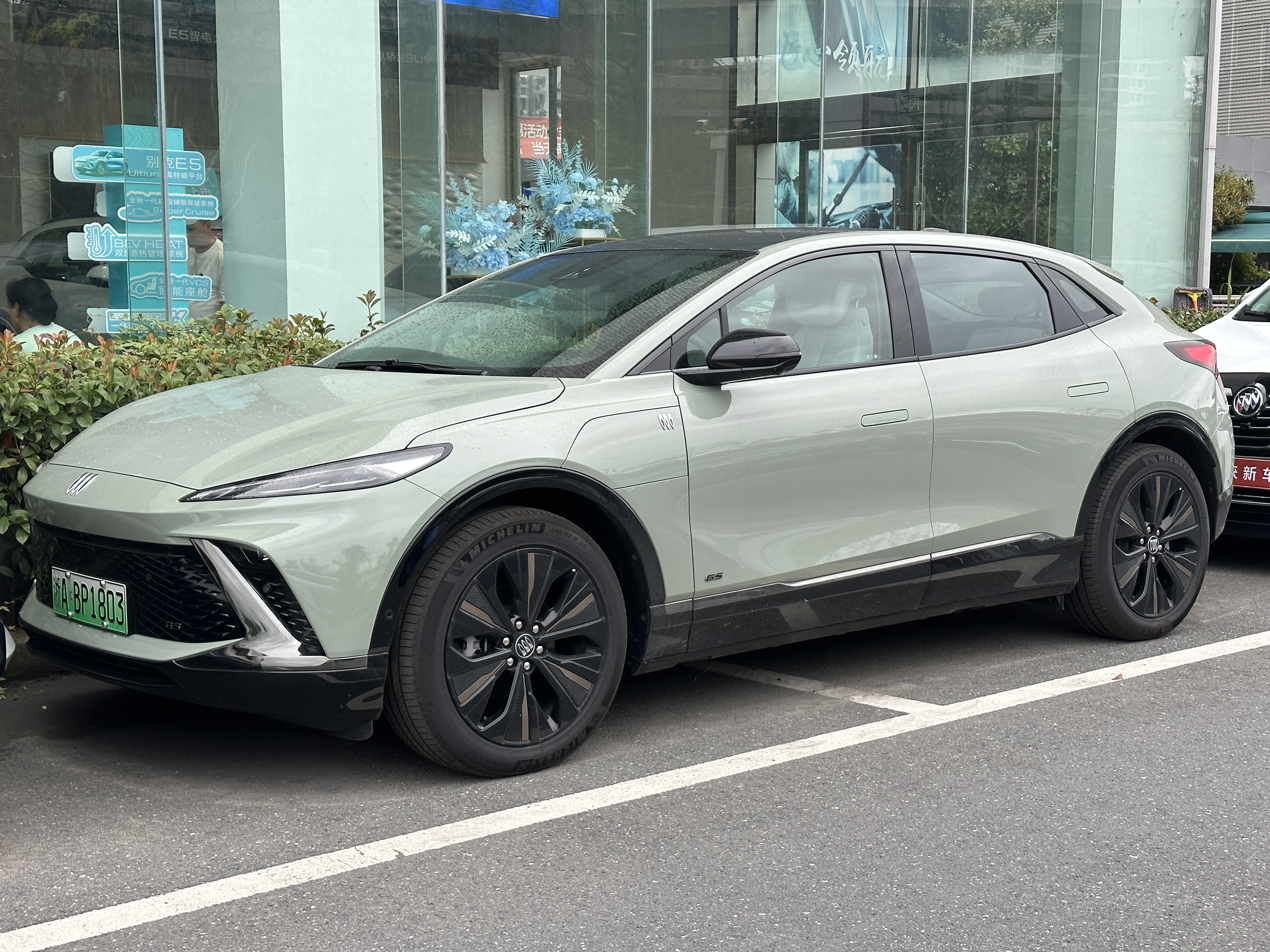
Electra E4

== Concept cars ==
Concept cars

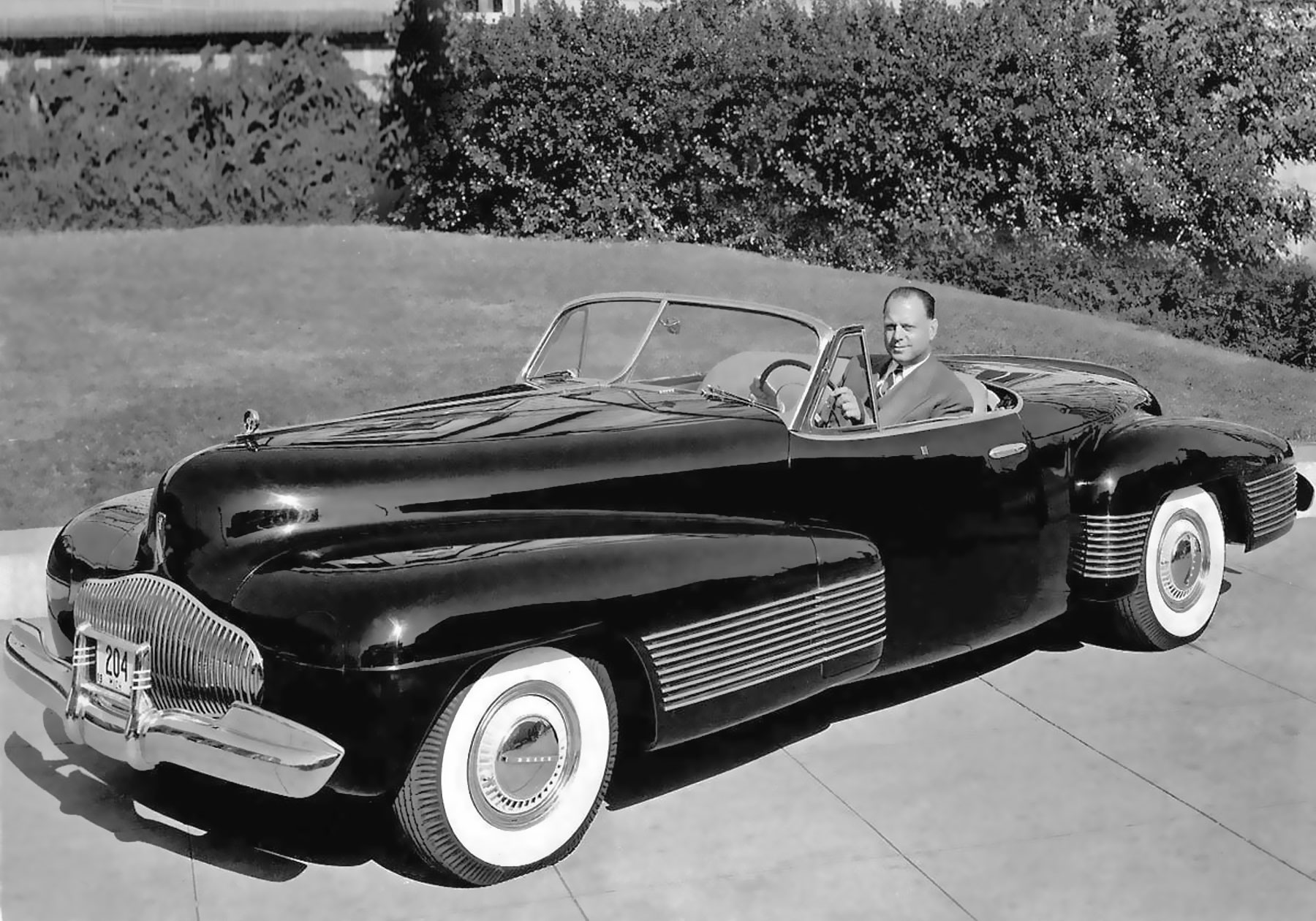
1938 Buick Y-Job concept

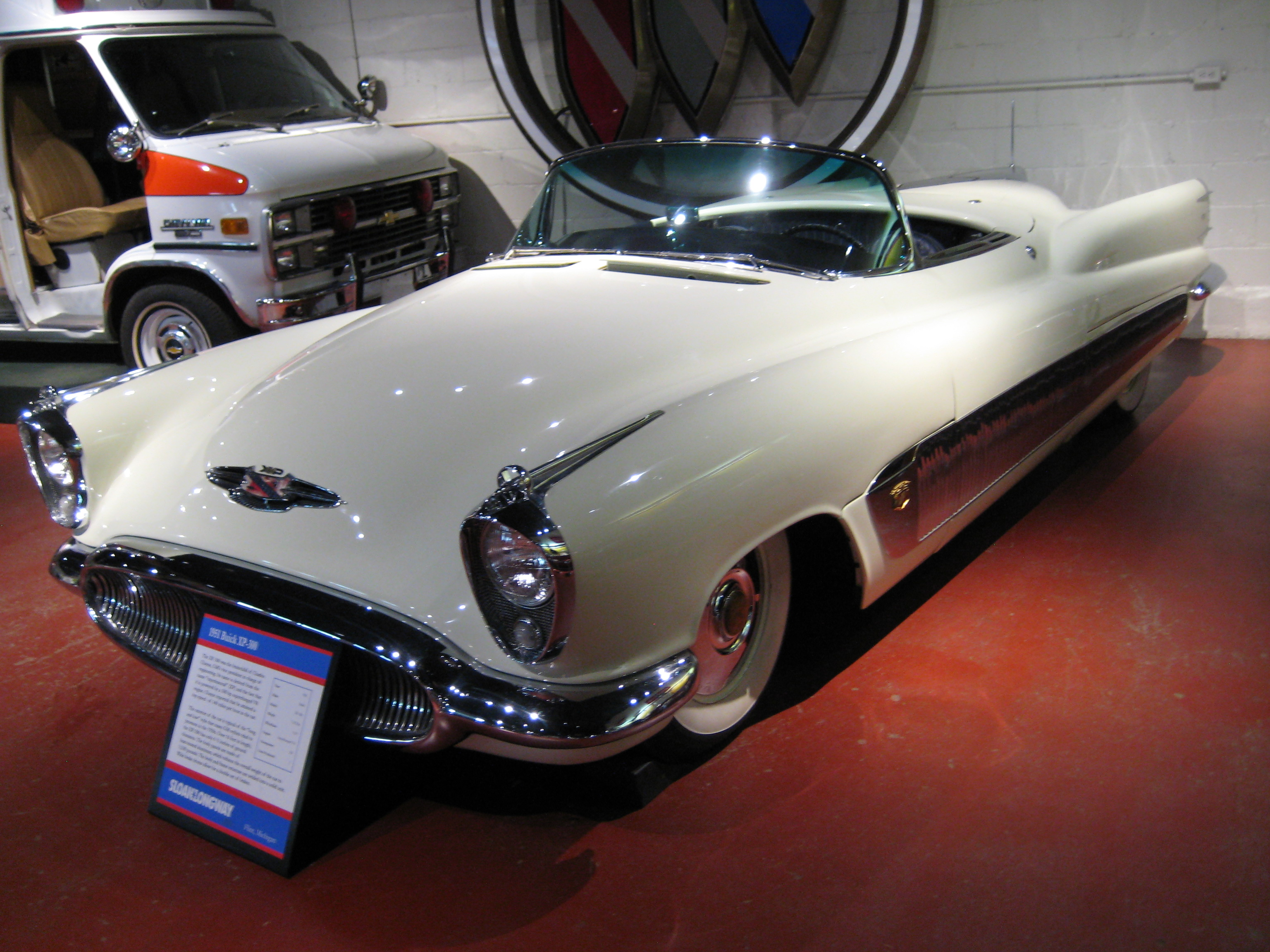
1951 Buick XP-300 concept

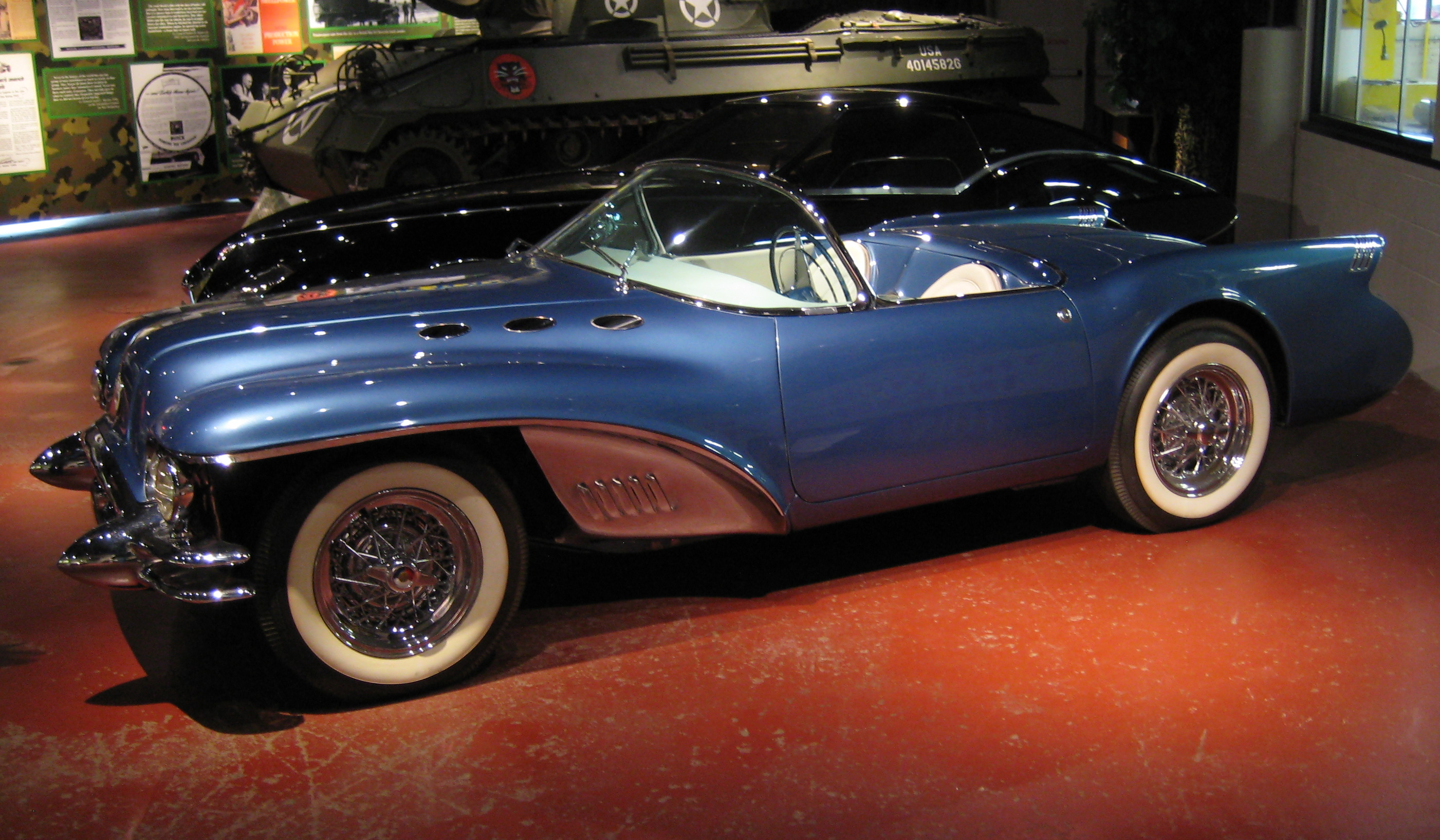
1954 Buick Wildcat II concept

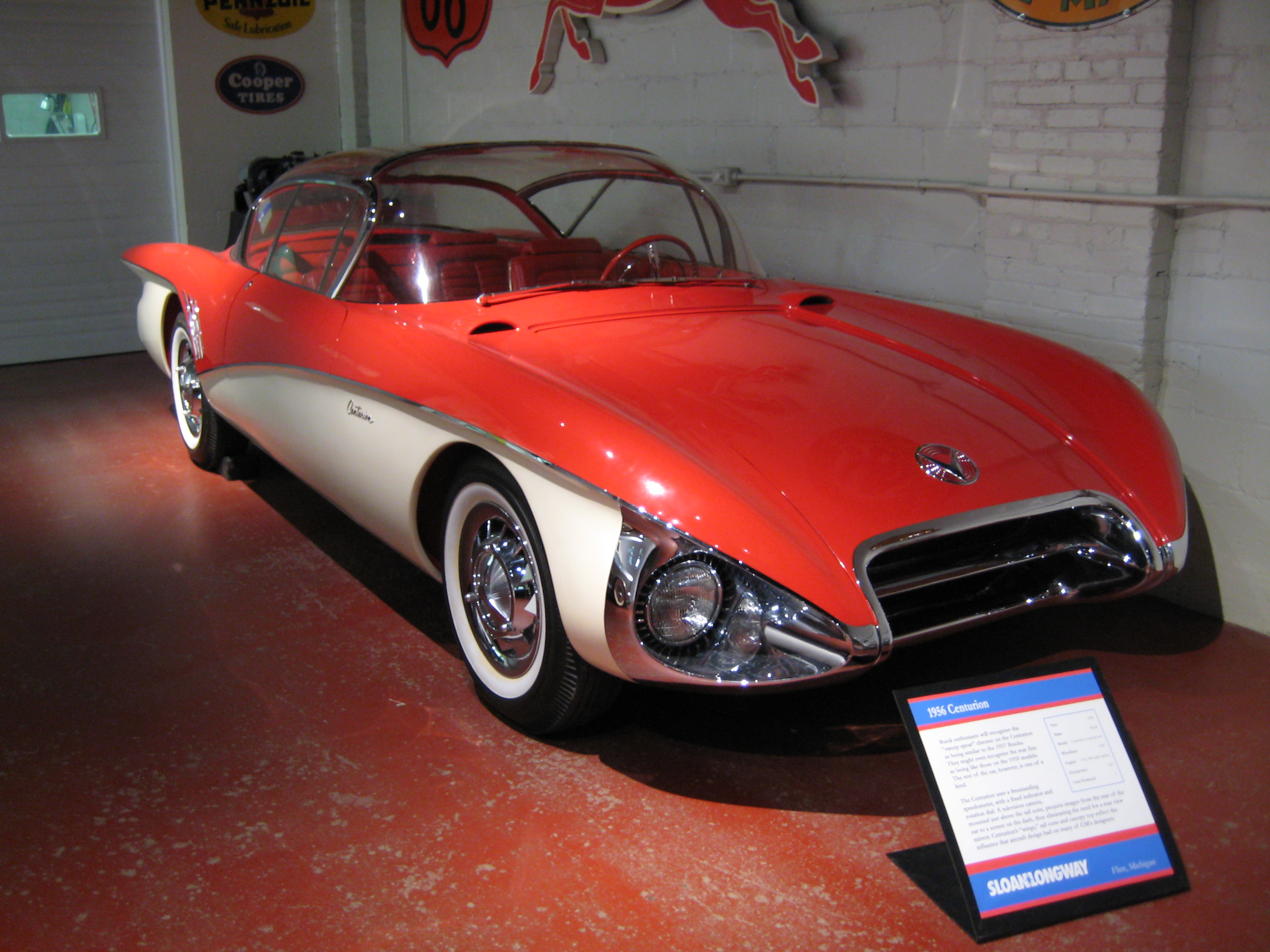
1956 Buick Centurion concept

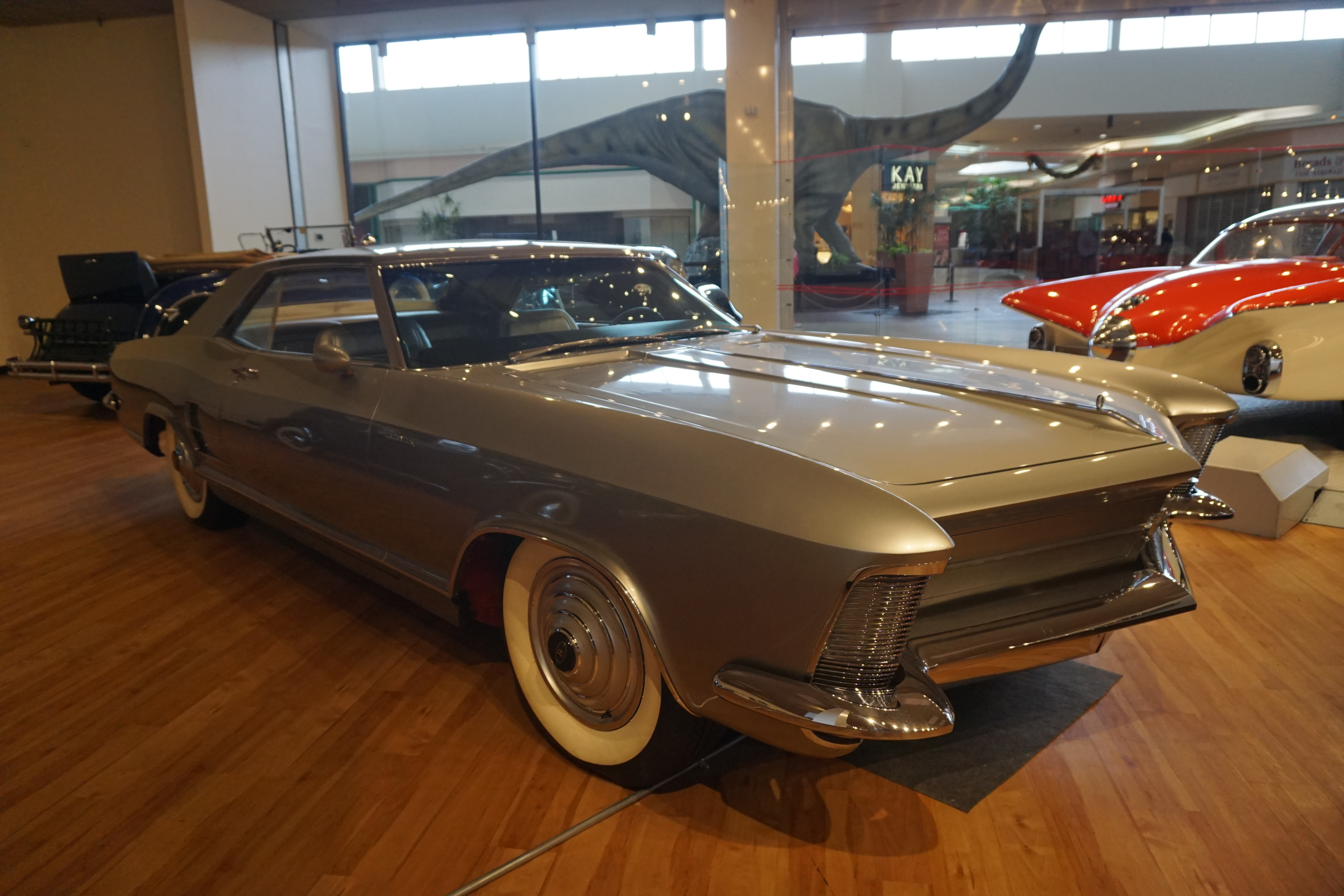
1963 Buick Silver Arrow concept

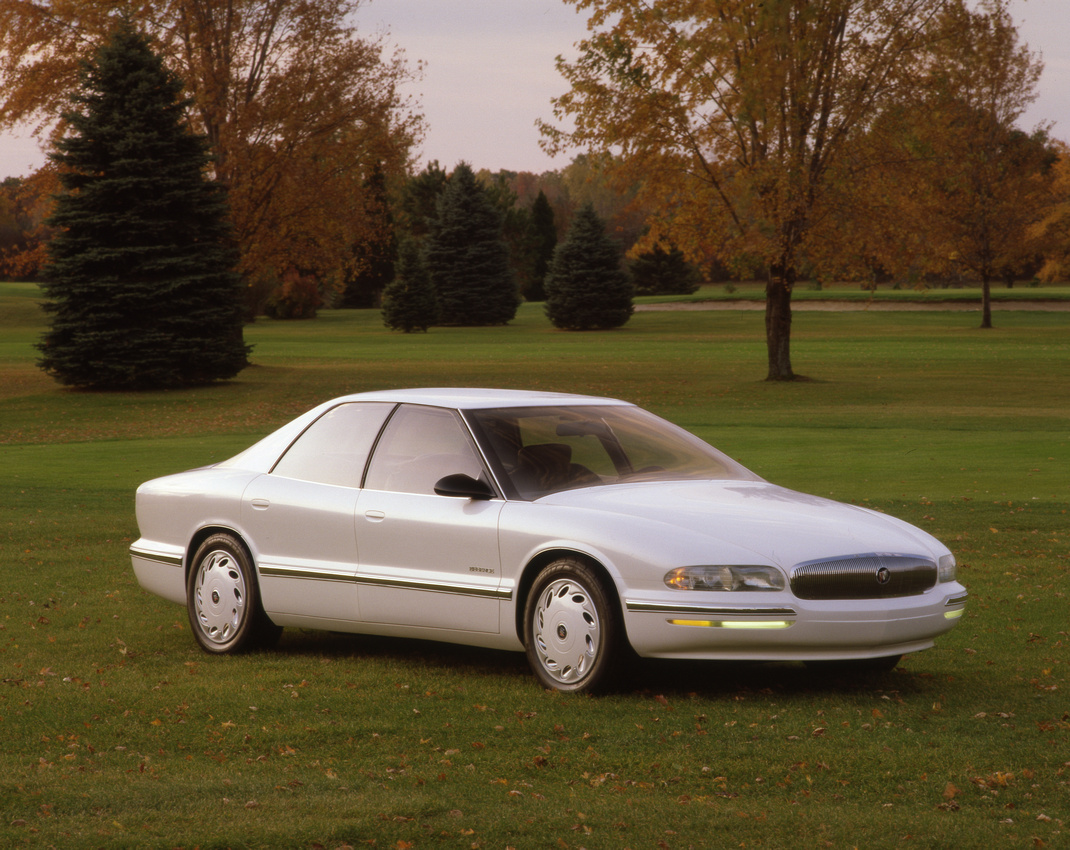
1989 Buick Park Avenue Essence concept

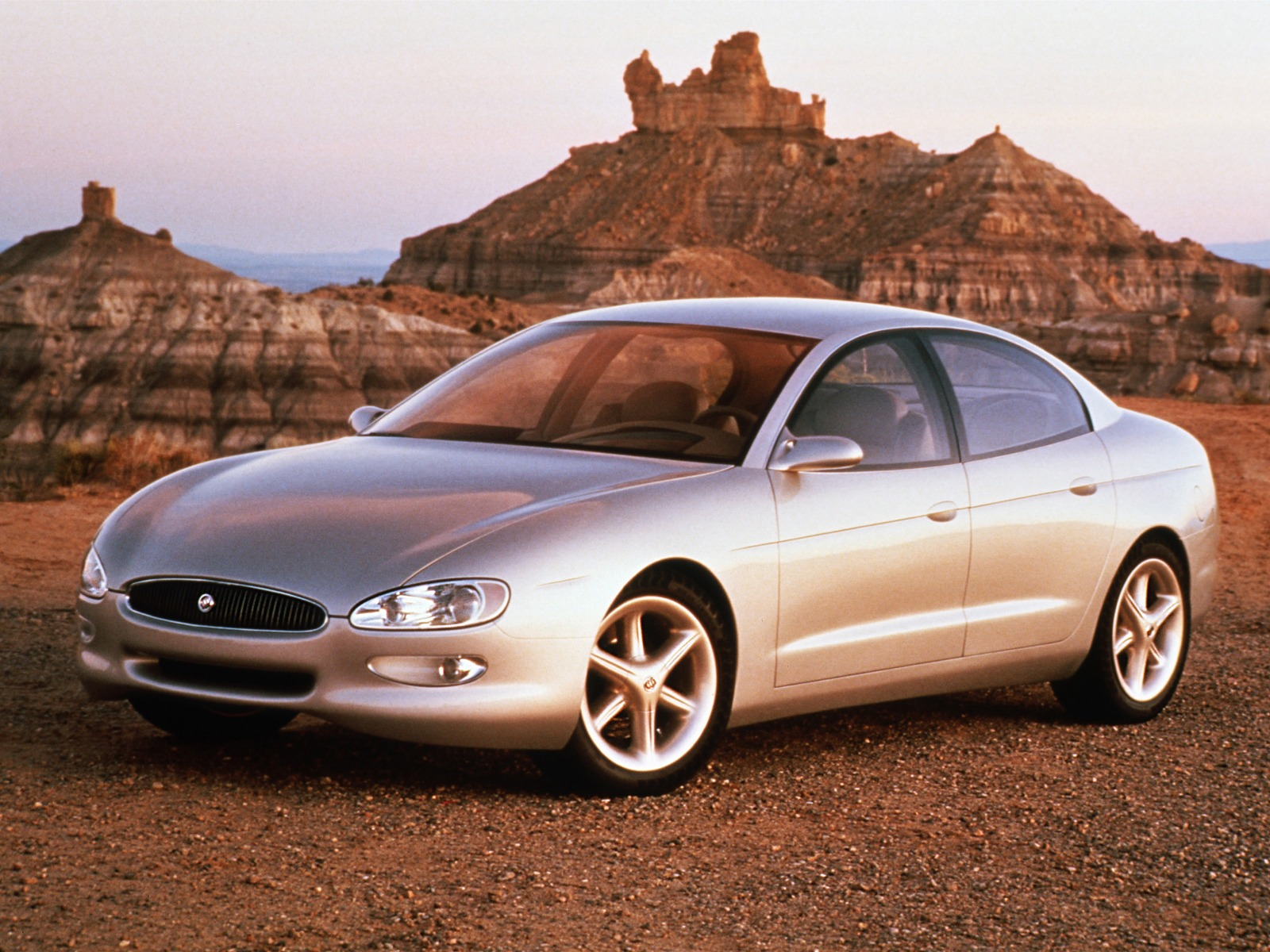
1995 Buick XP2000 concept

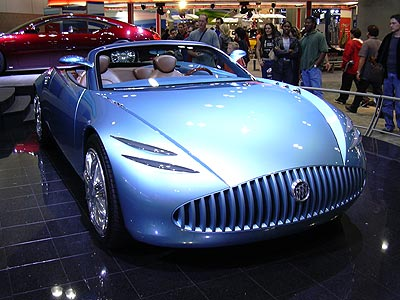
2001 Buick Bengal concept

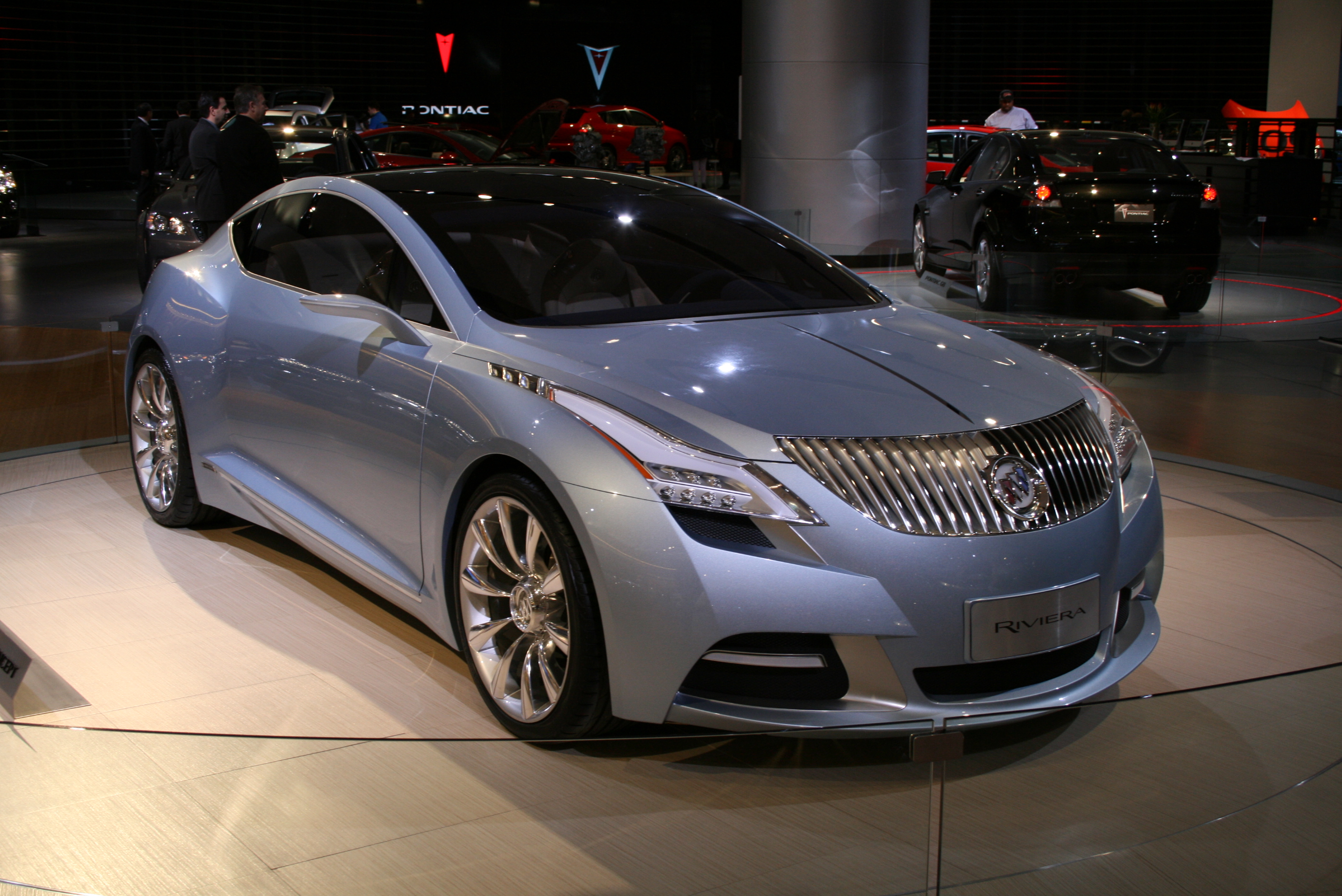
2007 Buick Riviera concept

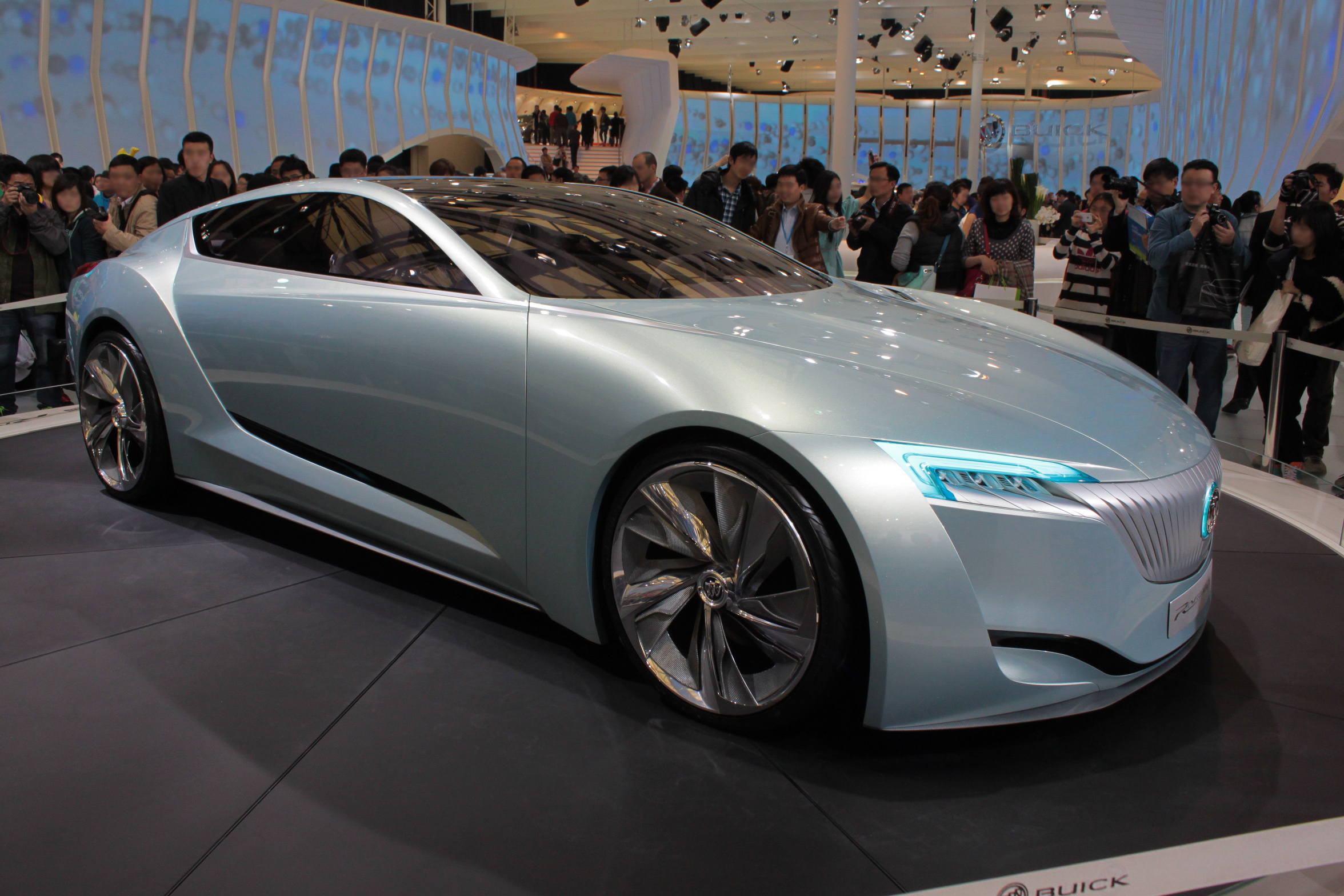
2013 Buick Riviera concept

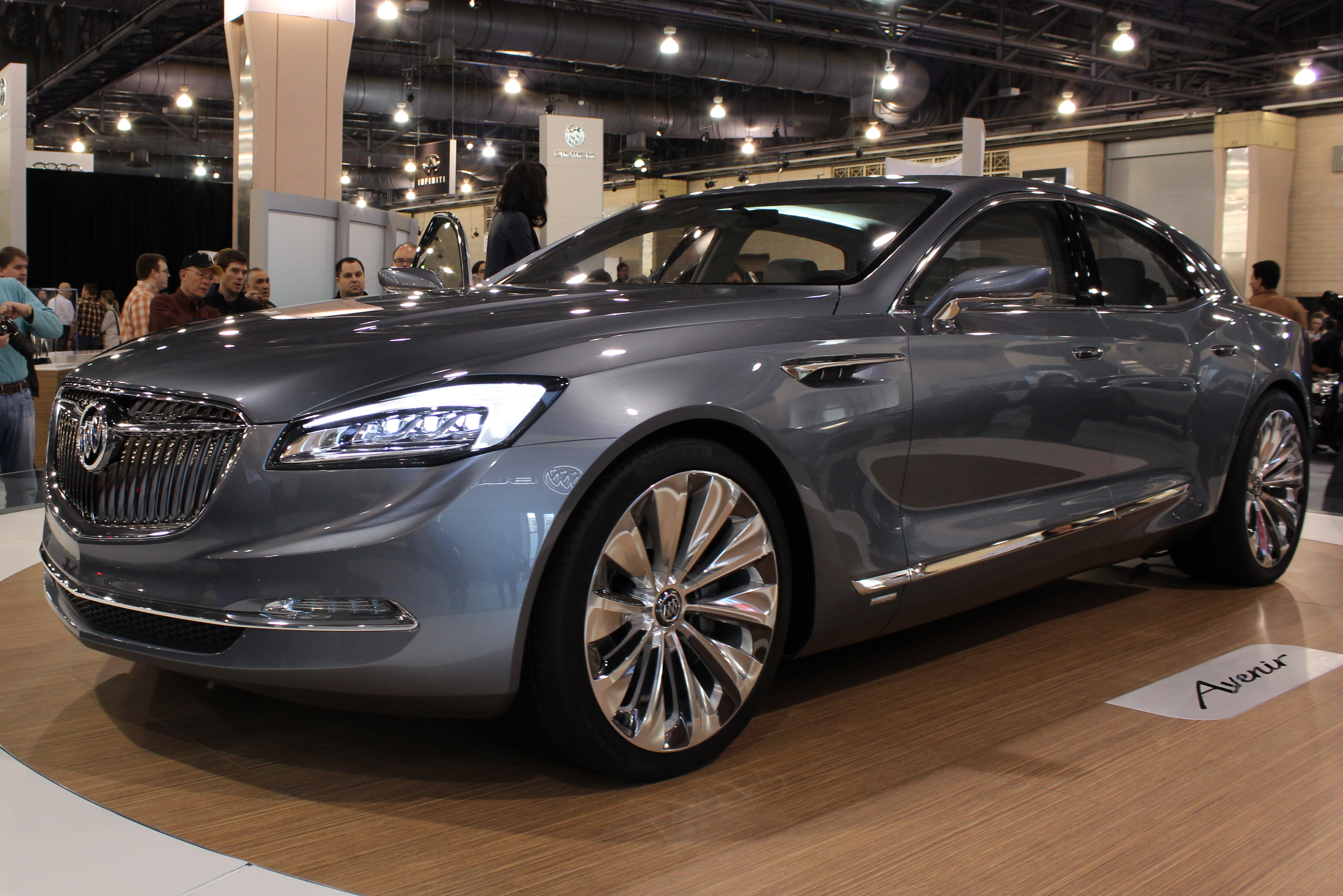
2015 Buick Avenir concept

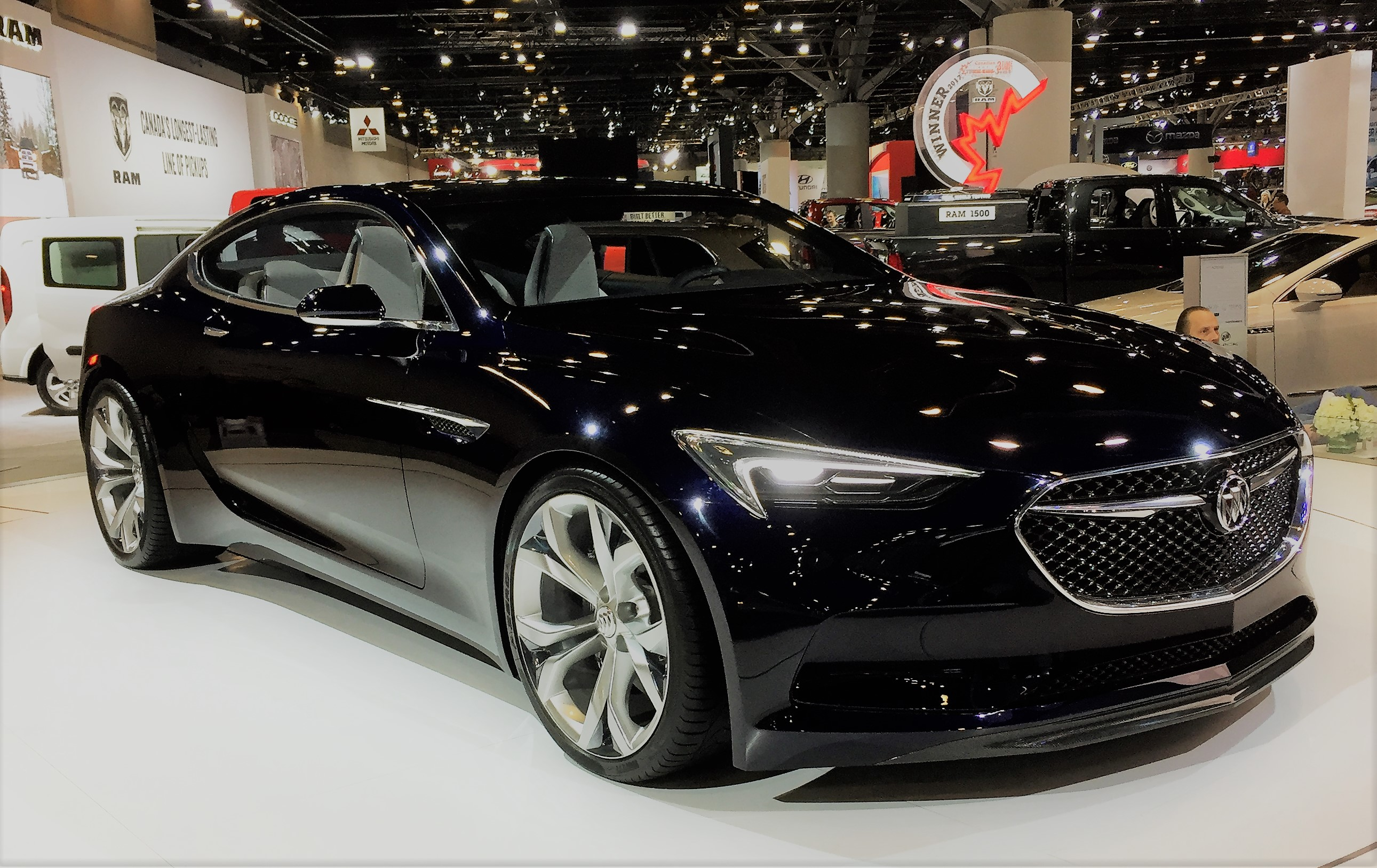
2016 Buick Avista concept

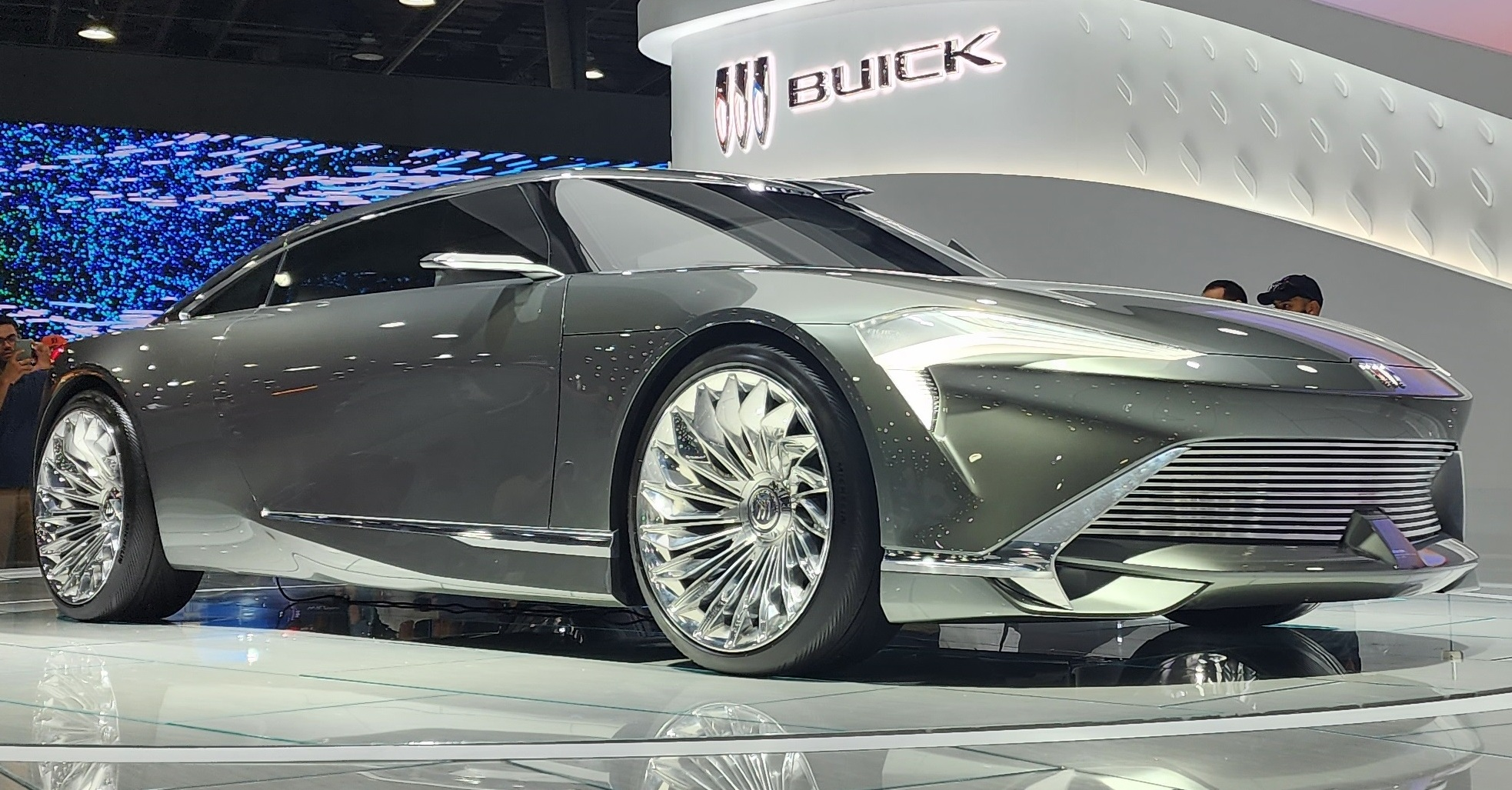
2022 Buick Wildcat concept

Buick has a long history of creating intriguing concept cars dating back to the Y-Job, the industry's first concept car, of 1938. Its most recent concept car, the Buick Electra Orbit, was unveiled in 2025.

== Distinguishing features ==
=== Trishield ===
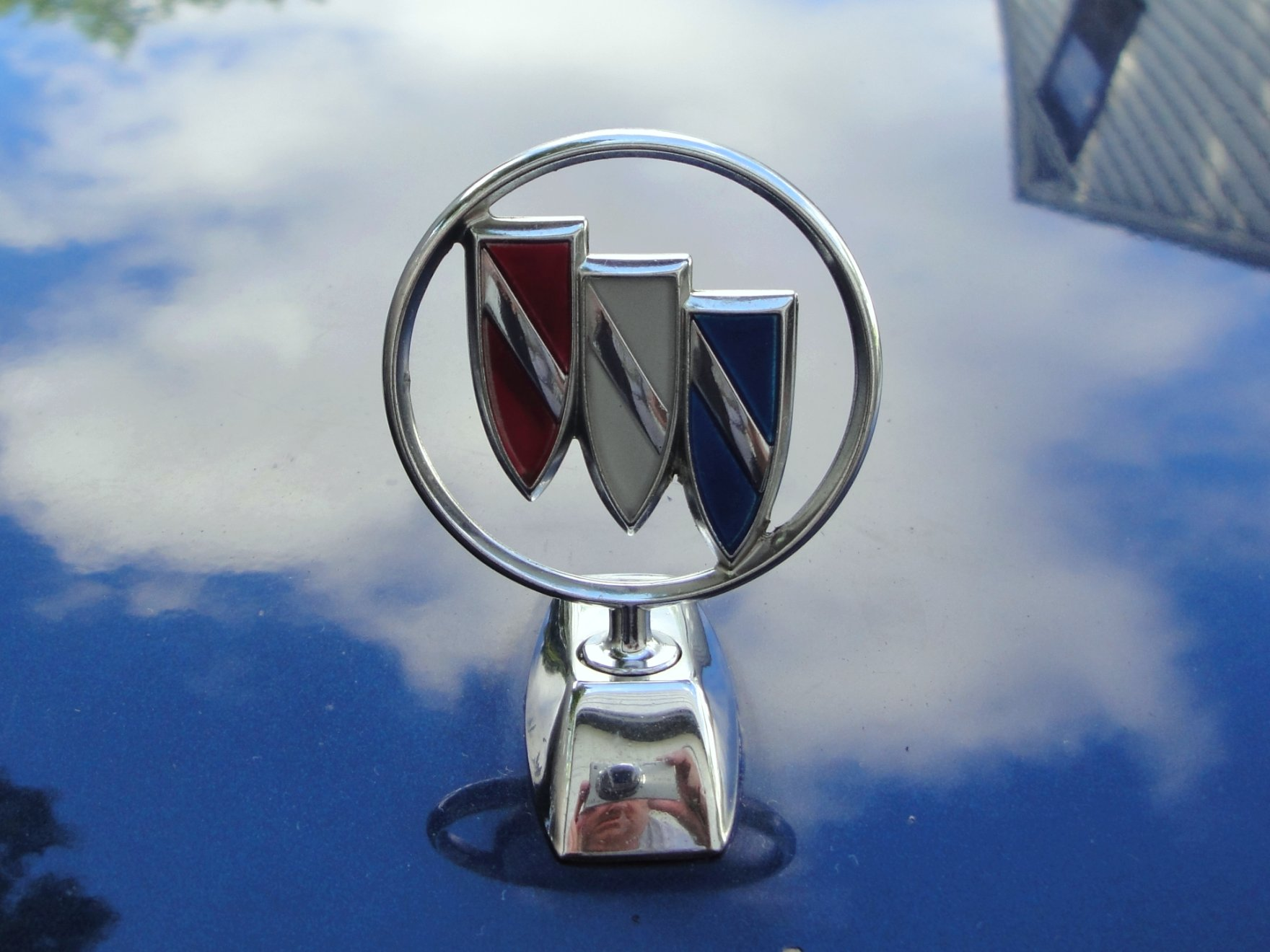
A trishield, the Buick symbol, hood ornament on a 1990 LeSabre Custom

The Buick Trishield is rooted in the ancestral coat of arms of the automaker's founder, David Dunbar Buick. That crest was a red shield with a checkered silver and azure diagonal line from the upper left to lower right, a stag above, and a punctured cross below. The division adopted this on its radiator grilles in 1937. In 1960, the logo underwent a major overhaul. Its single shield was replaced by a trio in red, white, and blue—denoting the LeSabre, Invicta, and Electra then in the Buick lineup. It was supplanted by the Buick Hawk in the 1970s, but reemerged in simplified form in the 1980s. The Trishield became monochromatic in 2005, but the traditional colors returned in 2023.

=== VentiPorts ===
A traditional Buick styling cue dating to 1949 is a series of three or four vents on the front fender behind the front wheels. The source of this design feature was a custom car of Buick stylist Ned Nickles, which in addition had a flashing light within each hole each synchronized with a specific spark plug simulating the flames from the exhaust stack of a fighter airplane. The flashing light feature was not used by Buick in production.

They were called VentiPorts because, as the 1949 sales brochure noted, they helped ventilate the engine compartment. Air entered from the grille into the engine bay, was pressurized by the radiator fan, and exited through the VentiPorts. Later in the model year, however, they were made non-functional and from then on were solely a styling feature.

When introduced, the number of VentiPorts (three or four) denoted the size of straight-eight engine installed. Since displacement differences in straight-eight engines resulted in more significant differences in engine length than on V8s, the Roadmaster needed a longer chassis in front of the cowl to accommodate its larger engine. Thus, an extra VentiPort corresponded to that additional length. After the more compact V8 replaced the straight-eight engine in 1953 this difference in chassis length was no longer needed, but the convention remained. Consequently, when the Century, which shared the Special's smaller body, was reintroduced in 1954, it also received four VentiPorts to denote its engine's greater displacement. However, in 1955, the Super, which shared the Roadmaster's larger body, was promoted from three to four VentiPorts despite having the smaller displacement engine. The Invicta, which took the place of the Century in 1959 and had the smaller body with the larger displacement engine, had only three VentiPorts on introduction; thus the number of VentiPorts came to denote body size rather than engine size.

In 1961, Buick introduced the first V6 engine installed in an American passenger car, in the Buick Special, and three VentiPorts appeared on the side, now denoting the number of cylinders instead of displacement or body size. VentiPorts would continue to appear on some Buick models through 1981.

In 2003 VentiPorts were re-introduced on the Buick Park Avenue Ultra, and continued with its replacement, the Lucerne. Consistent with the tradition that held from 1961, the Lucerne's VentiPorts refer directly to the number of pistons: V6 models have three on each side, while V8s have four on each side.

=== Sweepspear ===
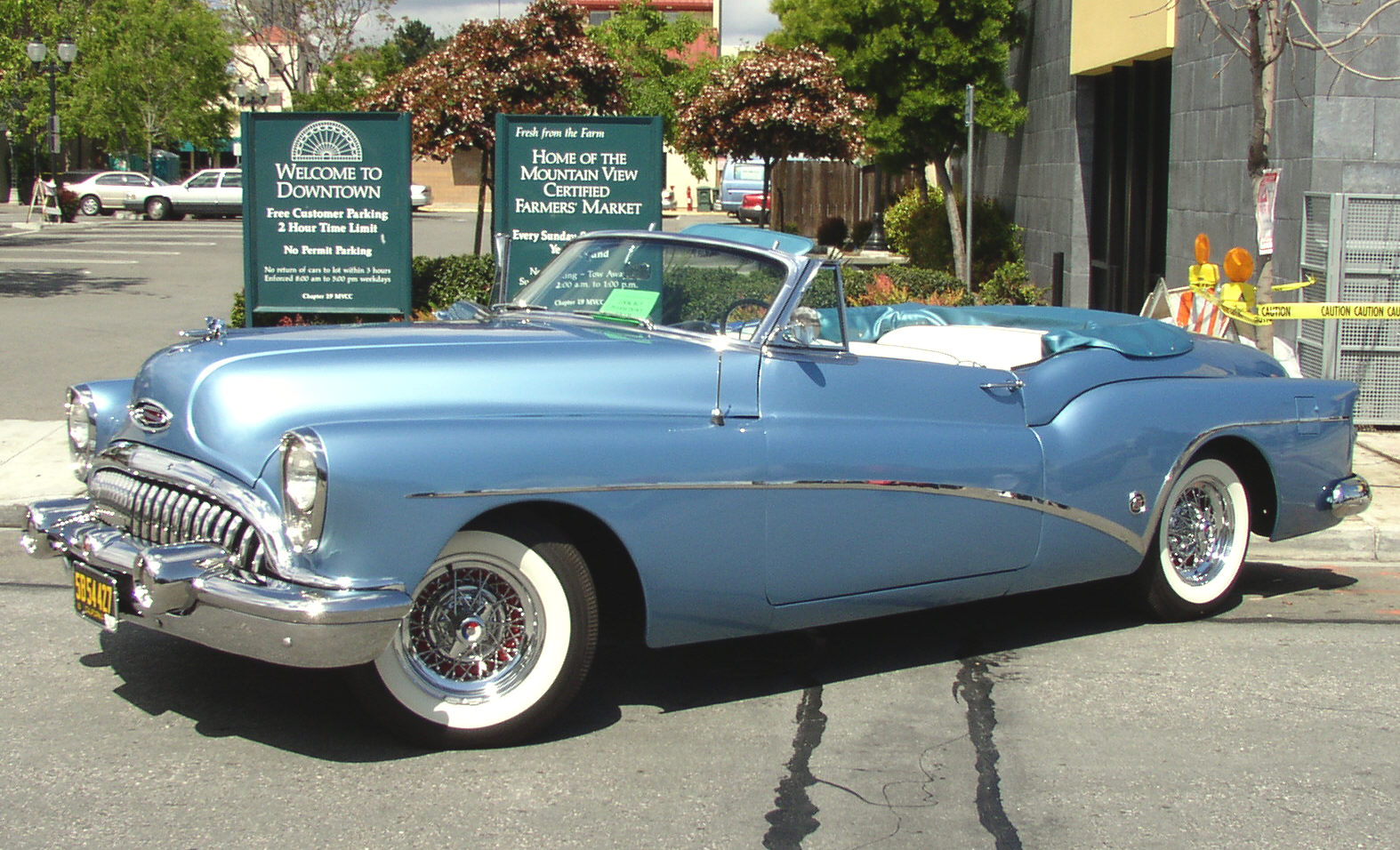
Sweepspear on a 1953 Buick Skylark

Another styling cue from the 1940s through the 1970s was the Sweepspear, a curved trim line running almost the length of the car. Introduced as an option on the 1949 Buick Roadmaster Riviera hardtop coupe, the original Sweepspear was a chrome-plated steel rub strip which began level over the front wheel, gently curved down across the front fender and door, dove nearly to the rocker panel just ahead of the rear wheel, then flared up and over the rear wheel before leveling off again into a straight run back to the tail light.

In 1942 all GM vehicles had an appearance upgrade where the trailing edge of the front fender was extended across the front doors that was called "Airfoil" accented by parallel chrome strips on the front and rear fenders on Buick vehicles. In later years the character line of the "Airfoil" feature was accented with a stainless steel strip that evolved into the Buick "Sweepspear" for several decades.

The "Riviera trim", as it was initially called, was made available on the Roadmaster convertible very late in the '49 model year. It proved so popular that by the 1951 model year, it was made a standard feature on all Buicks. On 1950s models with two-tone paint, the Sweepspear separated the two colors.

Originally stainless steel, the Sweepspear eventually became a vinyl rub strip or simple character line in the sheetmetal, as hinted in some versions of the Buick Riviera, distinct on the 1968–1969 Skylark, and appearing on the 2008 Invicta concept car. Often optional trim was available to reinforce a plain character line in the bodywork.

==== Delta fin ====
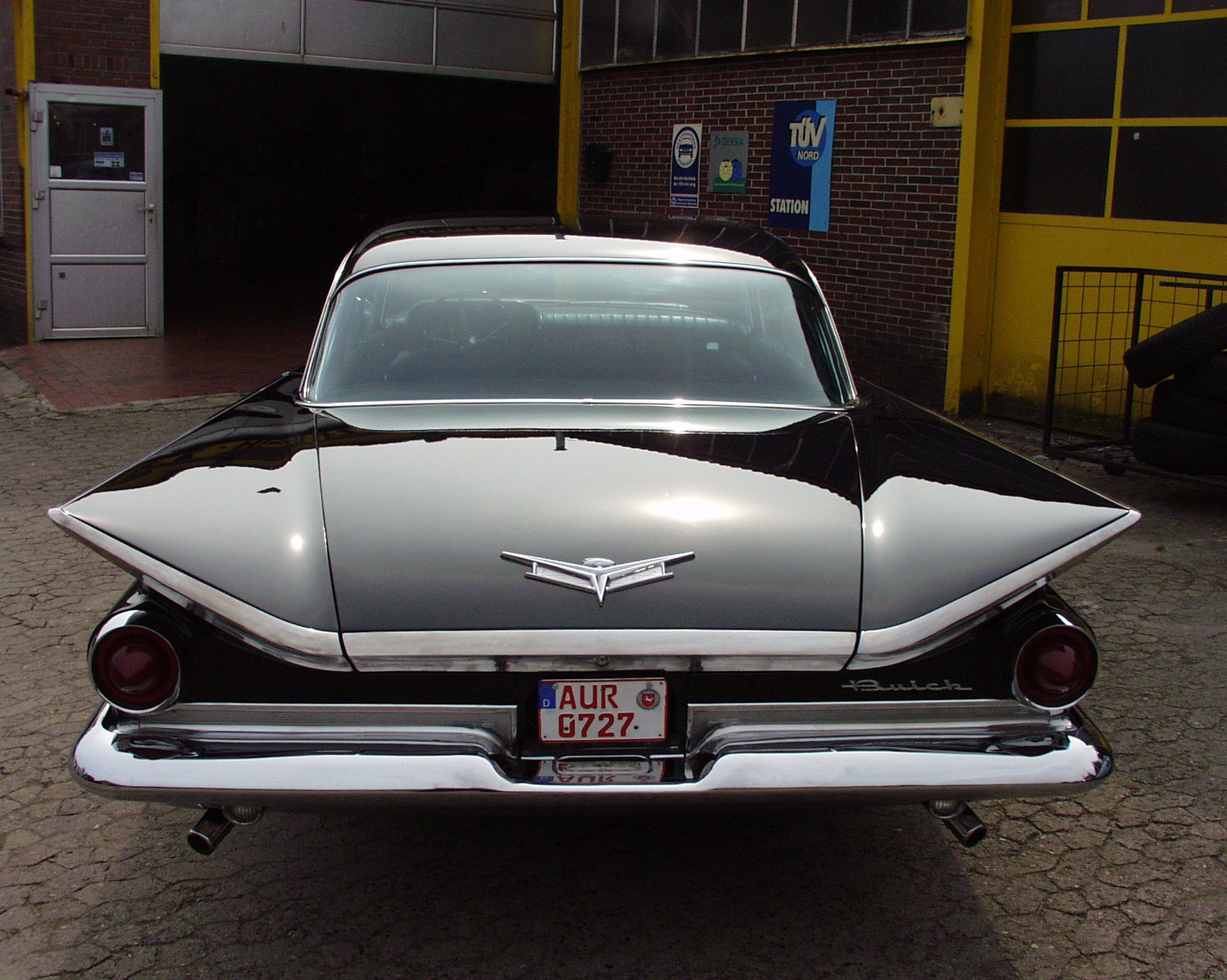
Delta Fins on a 1959 Buick Electra 225 Riviera

The 1958 Buick was marketed beginning in September 1957, just as the space age began with the launching of Sputnik I on October 4 of that year. The "Sweepspear" evolved into the "Delta Fin" reminiscent of a rocket ship, which appeared on the all-new appearance for 1959, and was trimmed down in 1960 and removed for 1961.

=== Taillight shapes ===
During the 1950s, the characteristic form of the Buick taillamps was a tier of small, circular bullet-shapes. In the early 1960s, most models began to evolve a wide, rectangular pattern, until the 1965 Skylark and Electra models appeared with full-width rear lamps.

=== Classic grille styling ===
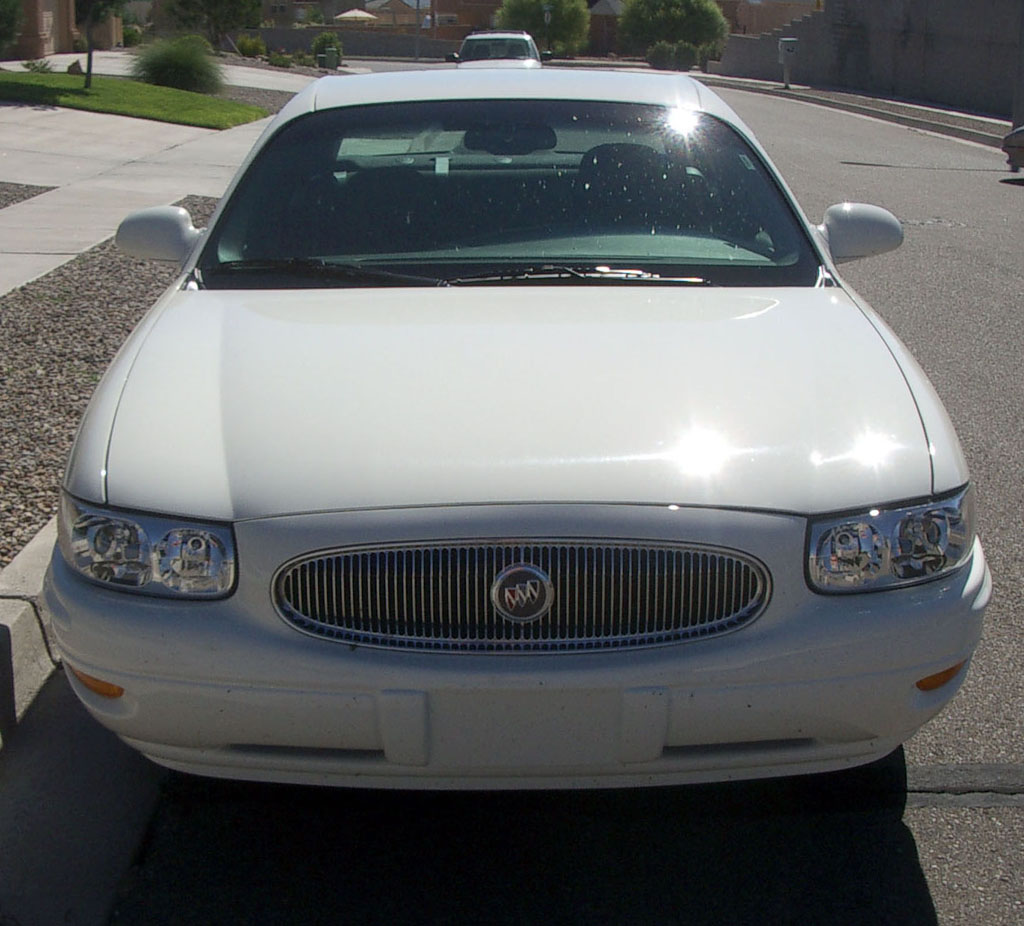
Buick "dollar grin" and "Trishield" in a Buick LeSabre

The Buick styling cue (dating from the 1942–1958 period) that has most often reappeared, though, is for the grille to be a horizontal oval with many, thin, vertical chromed ribs bulging forward. This has sometimes been called the Buick "dollar grin", particularly on the early 1950s models, which had thick, highly polished ribs that somewhat resembled teeth. The 1950 model took this tooth theme to its extreme as the teeth crossed over the bumper exposing the 1950 "grin", which was the result of extending the bumper guards over the front bumper, and was advertised as "Front and Center with Duty plus Beauty". The 1951 model reined in the theme, bringing the bumper guard "teeth" back behind the bumper.

=== Waterfall grille ===
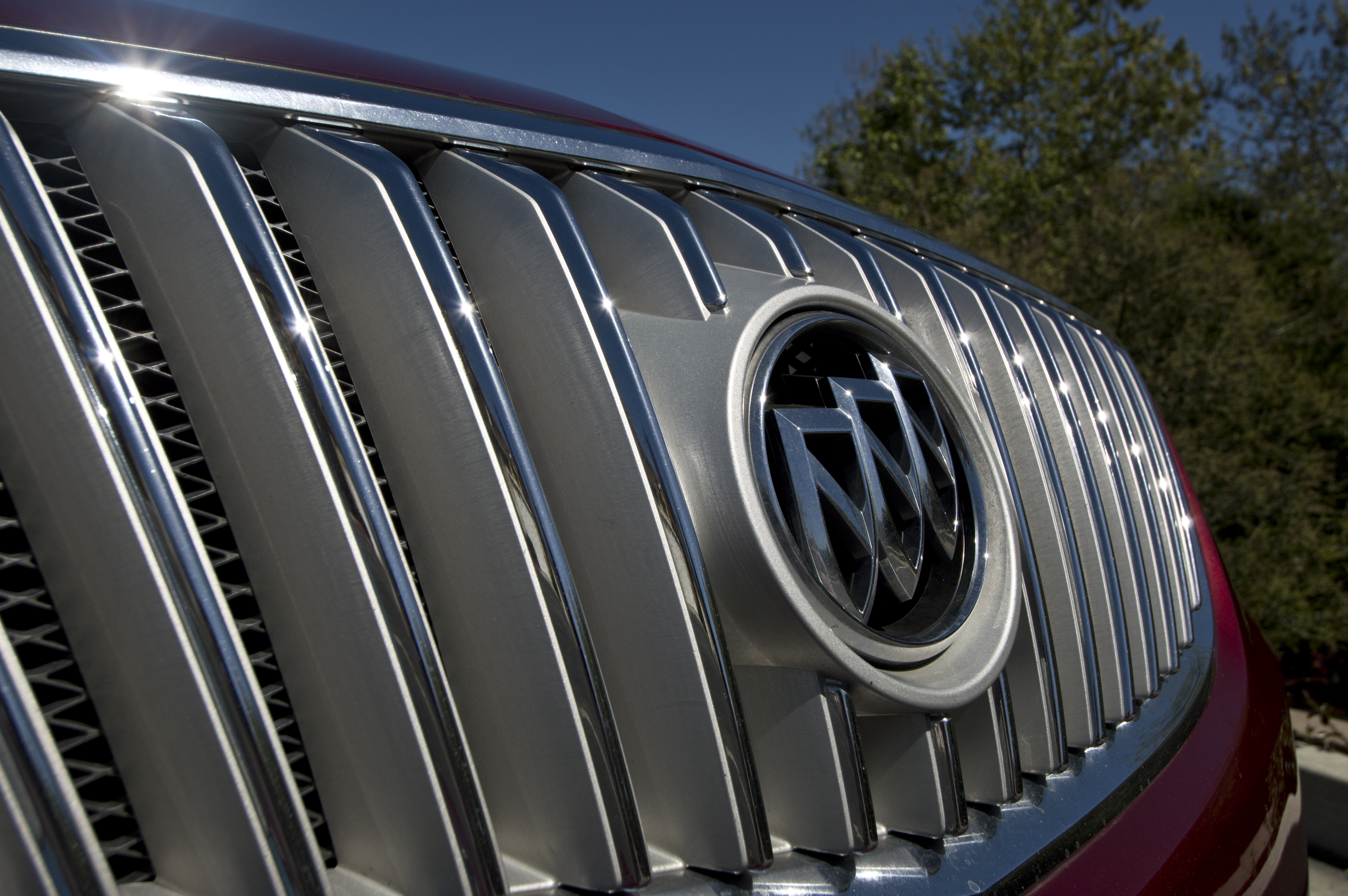
Revised Buick waterfall grille on 2nd generation LaCrosse

In recent years, Buick has adopted a waterfall grille, as seen on the Buick Velite concept car from 2004 and first used in production with the Buick Lucerne introduced for the 2006 model year. This waterfall grille bears some resemblance to grilles of Buicks from the 1980s, such as the Grand National.

=== Nailhead ===
The Buick V8 engine, nicknamed the Nailhead because of its relatively small intake and exhaust valves which resembled nails, became popular with hot-rodders in the 1950s and 1960s because the vertical attachment of the valve covers, in contrast to the angled attachment of other V8 engines, enabled the engine to fit into smaller spaces while maintaining easy access for maintenance.

== Performance ==
In addition to premium and luxury vehicles, Buick has also been well known for its offerings of high-performance cars. Some of the better-known examples included the Gran Sport and Skylark GSX models of the 1960s and 1970s, and the Grand National and GNX models of the 1980s, with a performance package revival called T-Type.

== World distribution ==
=== Asia ===
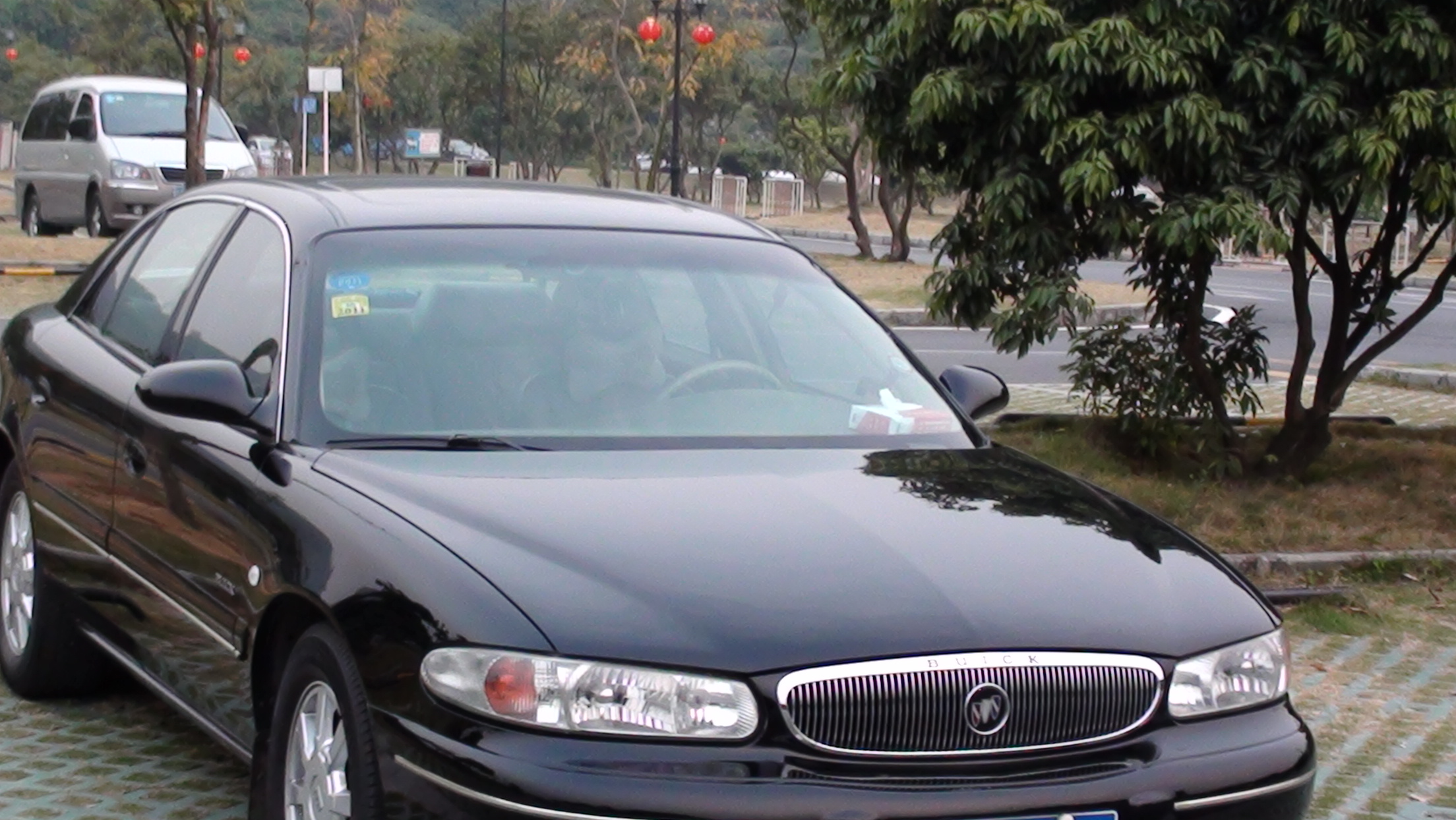
Buick G2.5 V6 made by Shanghai GM, China, 2002

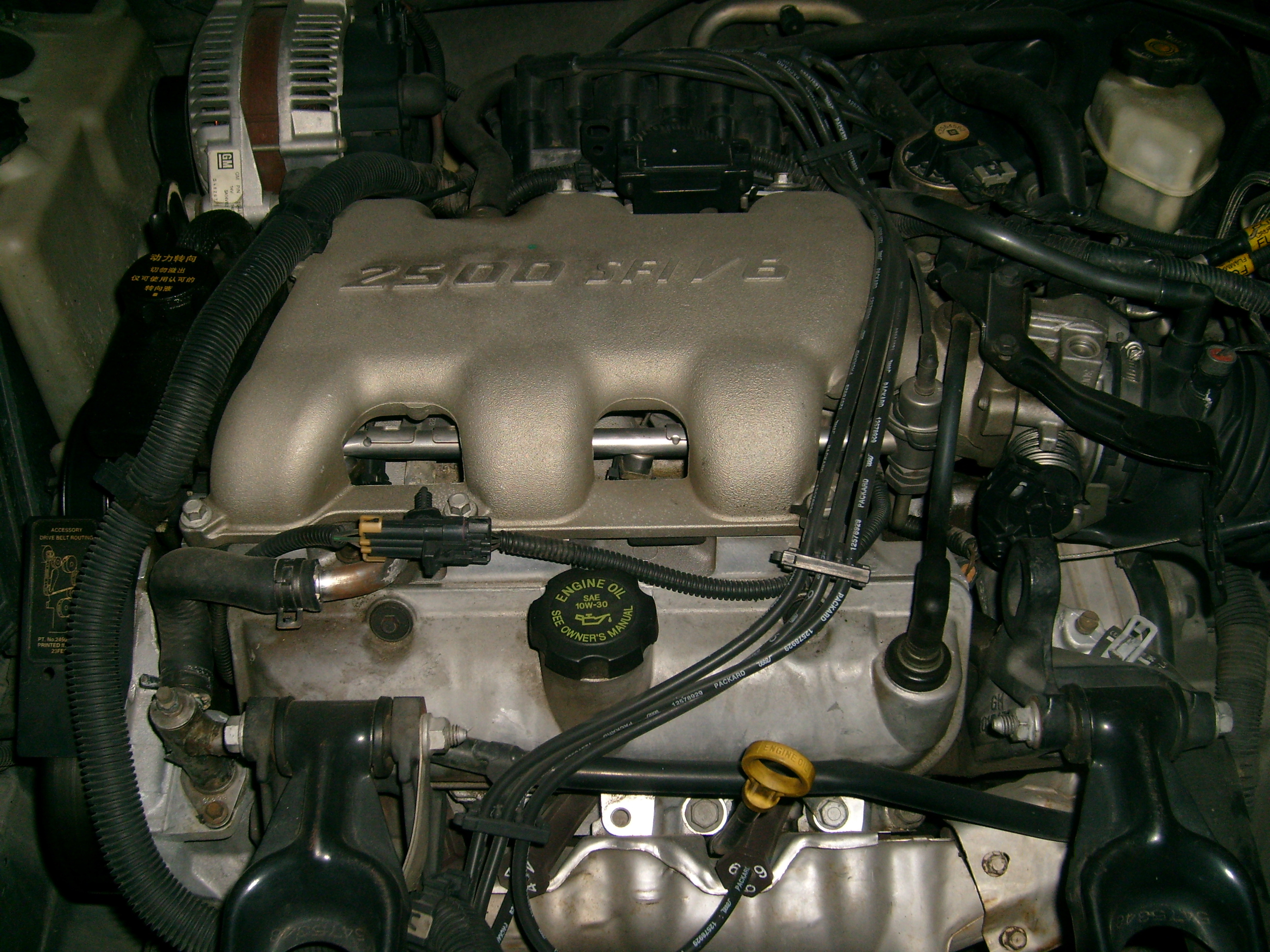
V6 engine of Buick 2.5G of Shanghai GM, China, 2002

Buick is one of China's most popular, best-selling automobiles. In 2016, General Motors sold over 1.1 million Buicks in China. Buicks have always been popular in China. In pre-World War II China, one in five cars was a Buick. Buicks were used by the last emperor Puyi, the first president Sun Yat-sen, and the first premier Zhou Enlai.

Since 1999, a Buick Regal for China has been produced and sold by Shanghai GM and has proven to be popular among upscale, professional families, establishing Buick as one of the most popular vehicle brands in China. In addition, Buick of China sells a compact Excelle, similar to a five-door hatchback version called the HRV, and a minivan named the GL8. Many Buicks for the local market are equipped with smaller more fuel-efficient engines with double overhead camshafts, than those with overhead valves in the same nameplate for the American market.

GM Taiwan was founded in August 1989. In the early 1990s, Buick, along with other GM brands, was very popular and frequently seen on Taiwanese streets. Park Avenue, 3rd and 4th generation Regal, and 6th generation Skylark used to be sold in Taiwan. In December 2004, General Motors signed a memorandum of understanding with Yulon, a firm based in Taiwan, for the licensed manufacture of Buick vehicles there. In July 2005, Yulon GM Motor Co. Ltd. (Yulon GM), a joint venture with 51 percent equity stake held by Yulon Motor and 49 percent by GM, was founded.

In April 2010, Buick debuted a localised version of LaCrosse, named Alpheon, to the South Korean market.

=== Mexico ===
Buicks were sold in Mexico from 1921 until 1962, when a protectionist policy on behalf of the government restricted the percentage of imported parts that could be used in the manufacture of vehicles and the sale of imported cars. From then onwards, all GM products were sold by Chevrolet dealerships. In 1990, after a heavy modification to the protectionist policy of the sixties, GM started assembling the Buick Century in Mexico, at the plant in Ramos Arizpe, in the state of Coahuila, just south of Texas, and selling it through Mexican Chevrolet dealerships, so it was not uncommon for many people to call it "Chevrolet Century". In 1997, GM stopped selling Buicks in Mexico and the brand was not sold there until 2009.

With the announcement in 2009 of the elimination of the Pontiac brand, it was speculated that Buicks would be sold once again in Mexico since there was a large network of Pontiac-GMC dealerships already in place. On July 24, 2009, Grace Lieblein, the new president of GM in Mexico, revealed that the Buick brand would be available in Mexico in late September of that year, after an absence of a dozen years, with the LaCrosse and the Enclave models. Buick shared the dealership floor with Pontiac and GMC until the Pontiac brand faded away in the summer of 2010.

On March 26, 2019, Buick announced that the Mexican division will offer only crossovers (Encore, Envision, and Enclave). The La Crosse sedan, Regal hatchback, and Regal TourX station wagon were dropped from the market as those brands were expected to be discontinued due to Opel's future (under new owner Stellantis). The Insignia is tied to the North American-badged Regal and Buick's decision to make the La Crosse exclusive to China.

=== Middle East ===
In Israel, Buicks are imported by Universal Motors, Ltd. (UMI), which also imports other GM vehicles. For model years 2004 and 2005, the Buick LeSabre and Buick Rendezvous were sold. For model years 2006 and 2007, the Buick LaCrosse and Buick Lucerne were sold alongside the Rendezvous. For the 2008 model year, the Buick LaCrosse and Buick Lucerne were available. Buicks were marketed throughout the Middle East until the second-generation Buick Roadmaster was discontinued, and continued to be available in the Gulf Cooperation Council markets until 1996.

=== New Zealand ===
Buicks were once sold in New Zealand. They were also built at the GMNZ plant in Petone, outside Wellington.

== Motorsport ==
For many years, Buick was a substitute for Chevrolet in automobile racing. Driver Phil Shafer drove a Buick to win the 1933 Elgin Trophy, considered to be the first officially organized stock car race in the United States.

No earlier than the 1960s, Buick was a competitor in the Indianapolis 500, and (like almost every other American manufacturer) also participated in the Grand National stock car racing series using its Regal and later the Gran Sport.

The golden age of Buick in motorsport, however, was early through late 1980s. General Motors entered the Regal, particularly the Grand National model, in the NASCAR Cup Series alongside the Oldsmobile Cutlass. Buick was also a major powerplant in the IndyCar Series and IMSA GT Series (particularly in the IMSA GTP class) for several years. The 1990s, however, proved to be the end of Buick's reign in motorsports, as GM replaced it for many years with Oldsmobile before phasing out that marque in 2004. Oldsmobile would be replaced by Pontiac until its demise in 2009, being replaced by Chevrolet.

Buicks were also entered in the Trans Am Series in the 1980s and 1990s using aftermarket V8 engines.

== Enthusiast organizations ==
The Buick Club of America, founded in 1966, is a non-profit organization dedicated to the preservation and restoration of automobiles built by the Buick Motor Division of General Motors Corporation.

== Advertisements ==
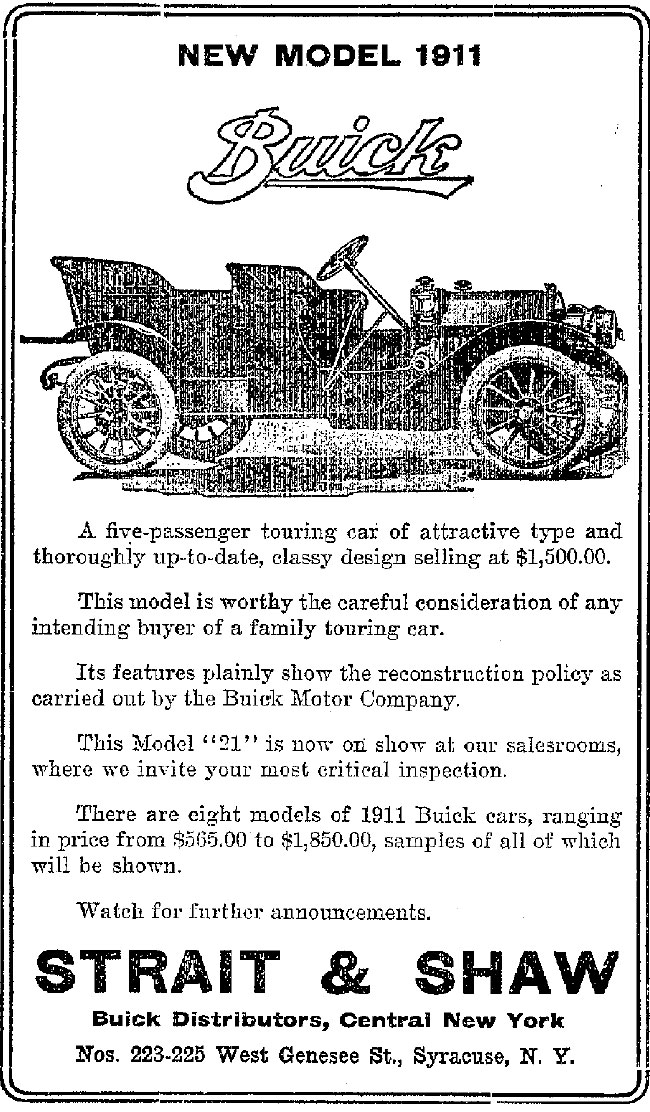
A 1911 Buick Advertisement - Syracuse Post-Standard, January 21, 1911

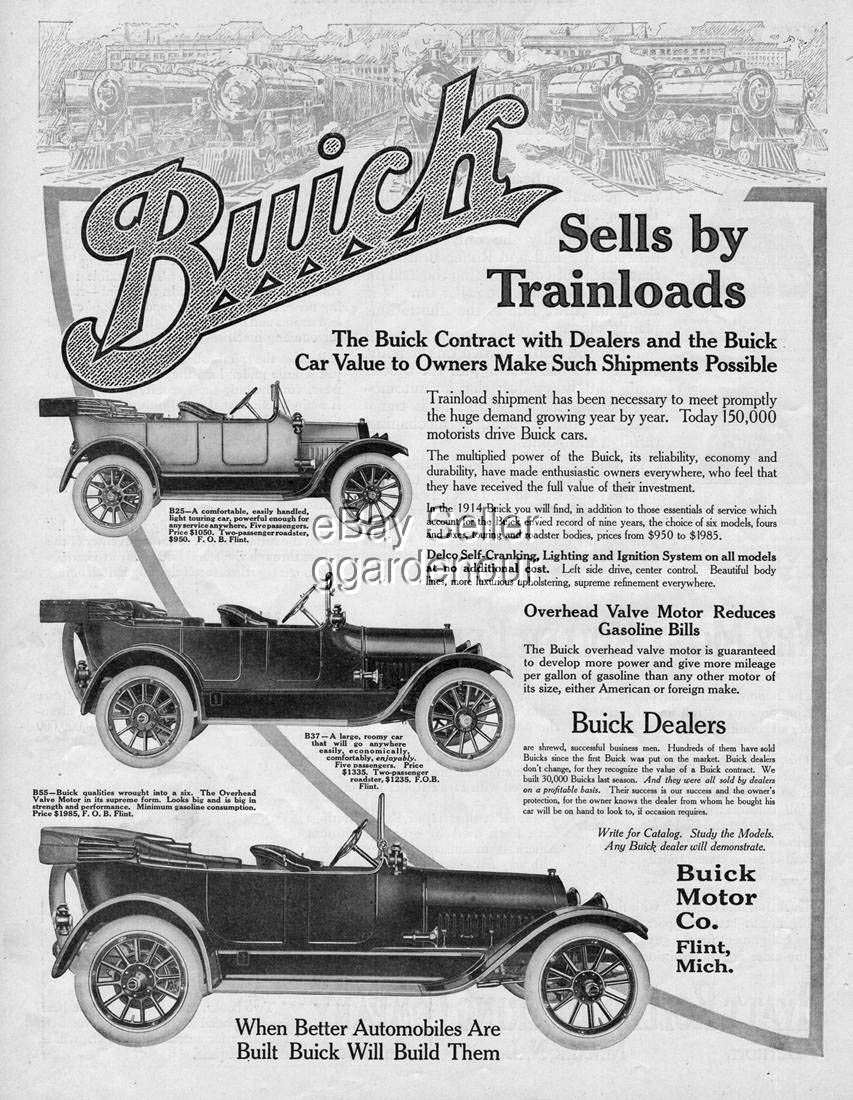
1913 advertisement

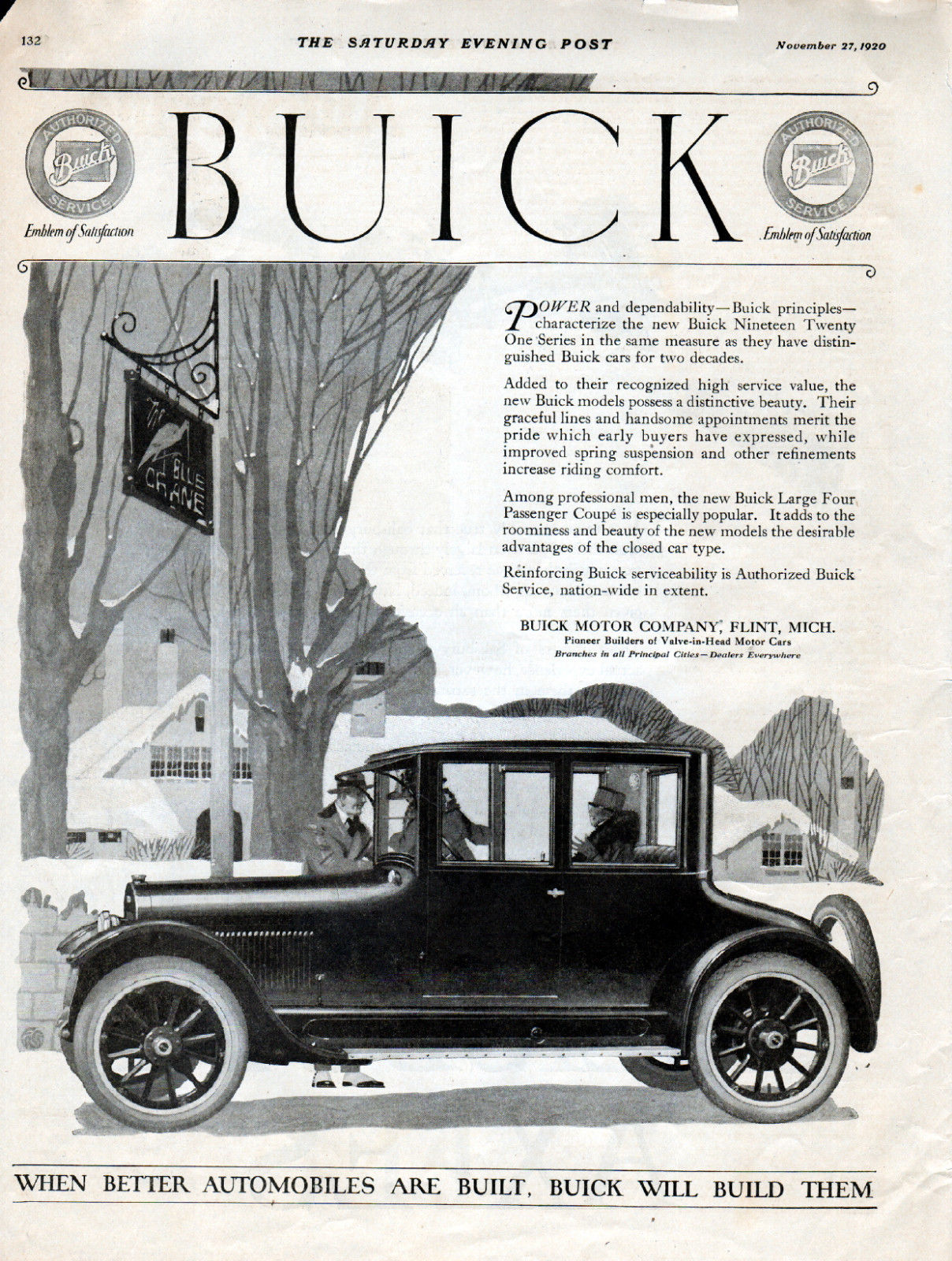
The Saturday Evening Post, November 1920

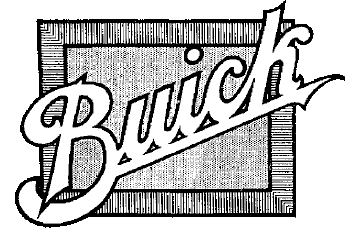
1912 Buick logo

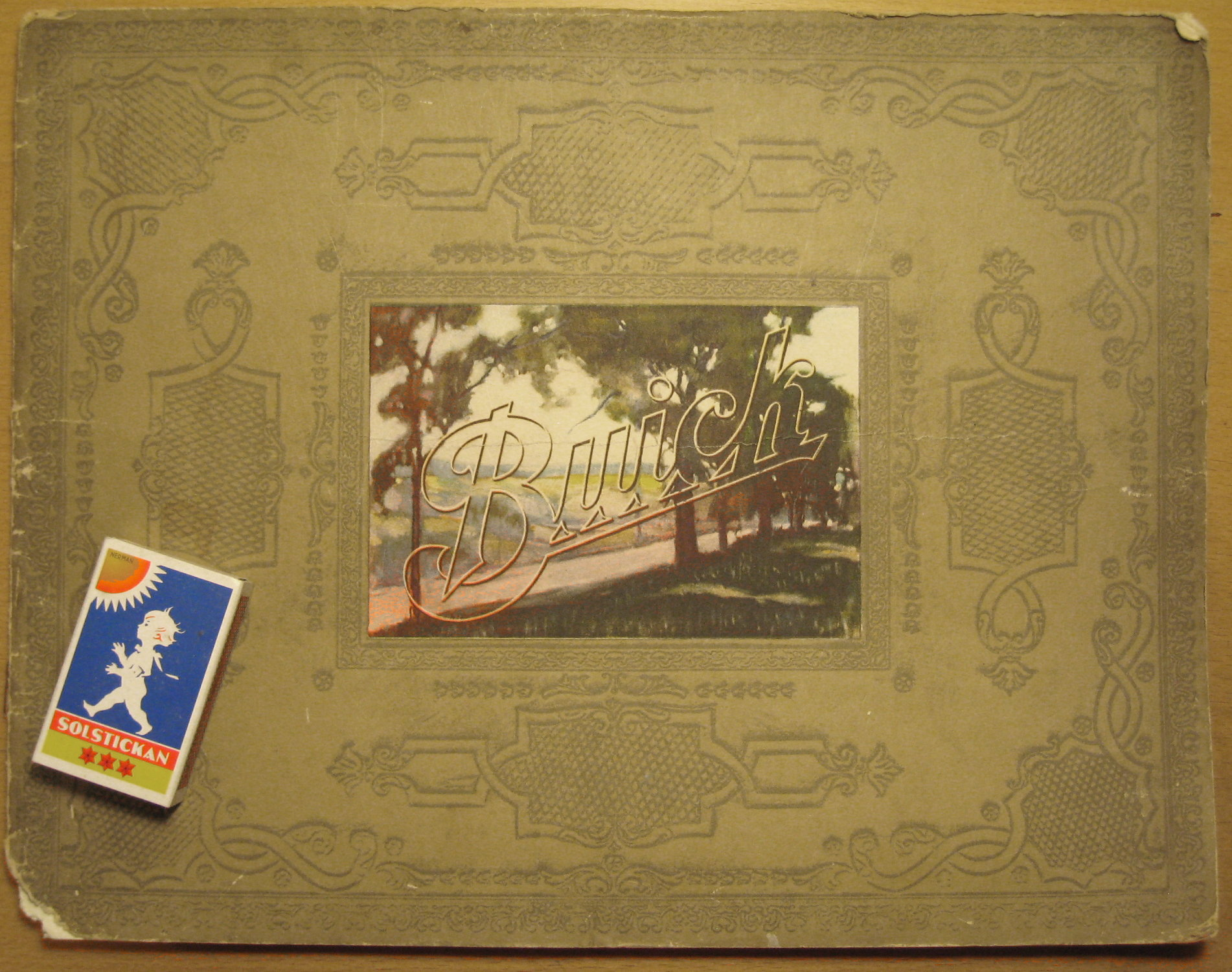
Cover of 1925 promotional folder from Swedish reseller

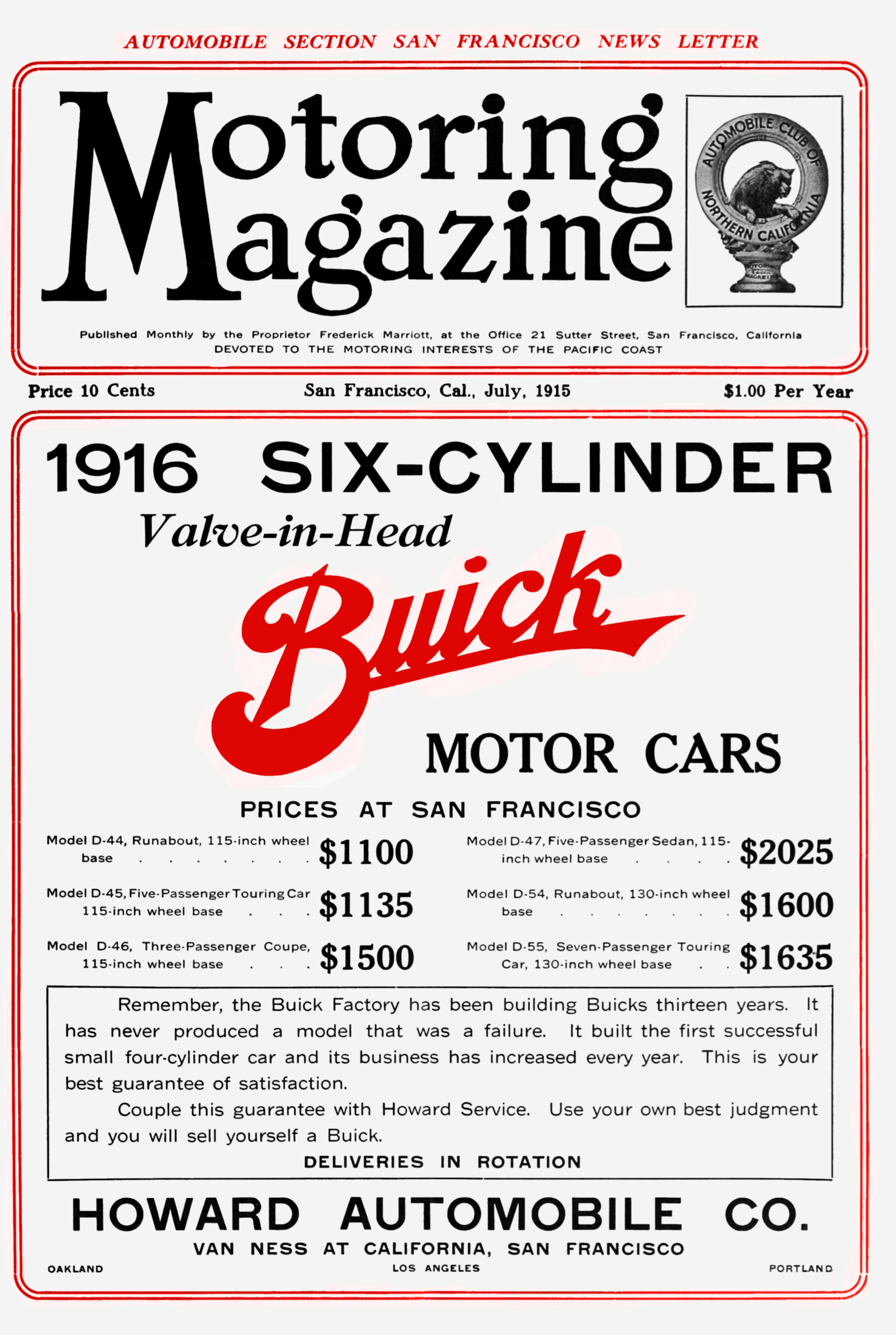
Advertisement for 1916 Buick by dealer Howard Automobile Co., San Francisco

== See also ==
- List of automobile manufacturers of the United States
