= Buick Club of America =

The Buick Club of America (BCA), founded in 1966, is a non-profit organization dedicated to the preservation and restoration of automobiles built by the Buick Motor Division of General Motors Corporation. The Buick Club promotes activities, resources, and friendships. The Buick Club has 8,000+ worldwide members and 70+ local Chapters in nine regions. These chapters promote local networking among Buick enthusiasts. The Club also has seven divisions based on vehicle types instead on geographic locations. One must be a member of the national organization to be a member of a division or chapter.

The Buick Club of America is not affiliated with Buick Motor Division, nor with General Motors.

== Membership ==
The Buick Club of America is a renowned and respected club and offers domestic and international memberships for anyone interested in the Buick automobile. Ownership of a Buick is not a requirement of membership.

== Activities ==
=== The Buick Bugle ===
The monthly magazine of the Buick Club of America is the Buick Bugle. The magazine features a variety of types of articles, including year and model specific authenticity features, historical documentation, personal interest stories, and technical tips. The magazine also features Buick-related advertisements for parts and services as well as member classified ads for cars, parts, and other related items.

=== Website and internet forum ===
The BCA maintains as website containing general and historic information and events calendars. Through this website, members may also access internet forums to discuss specific issues.

=== National Meet ===
Each year the Buick Club of America host their National Meet. There is only one BCA National Meet and it moves around the United States. Historically the Meet has been hosted by a Chapter or Region of the BCA. Beginning in 2013 the meet will be hosted by the BCA National Meet Committee.

The National Meet features various competitions for different classes of automobiles:

- Restored or excellent condition unrestored vehicles 12 or more years old
- Unrestored vehicles 25 or more years old of any condition
- Drivers award—awarded to a vehicle 25 or more years old that is driven (i.e. not transported) from the owner's home to the meet location (indicating ongoing road-worthiness).
- Modified Vehicles in categories of Mild / Resto Rod / Radical / Driven
- Display only vehicles of all years to current

Some of the Regions of the BCA host Annual Regional Meets or Tours.

Divisions of the BCA hold annual tours and activities as well, some in conjunction with the BCA National Meet.

==== Locations of National Meets ====
Year	Location	Host
1971	Flint, MI	Buick Motor Division and Volunteer Buick Club Members
1972	Flint, MI	Buicktown
1973	Flint, MI	Buicktown
1974	No Meet	
1975	Flint, MI	Buicktown and North East Ohio
1976	Flint, MI	Buicktown and West Michigan
1977	Strongsville, OH	North East Ohio
1978	Flint, MI	Buicktown and North East Ohio
1979	Bloomington, MN	Gopher State
1980	Chicago, IL	Chicagoland
1981	Sandusky, OH(Cedar Point)	North East Ohio
1982	Bethlehem, PA	Free Spirit
1983	Westerville, OH	Central Ohio
1984	Atlanta, GA	Dixie
1985	Los Angeles, CA	LA chapter
1986	Indianapolis, IN	Central Indiana
1987	Orlando, FL	Sunshine State
1988	Flint, MI	Buicktown Chapter
1989	Batavia, NY	Finger Lakes
1990	Cincinnati, OH(Kings Island)	Southwestern Ohio
1991	Sacramento, CA	California Capitol
1992	Overland Park, KS	Mid-America Chapter
1993	Phoenix, AZ	Valley of the Sun Chapter
1994	Atlanta, GA	Dixie Chapter
1995	Lisle, IL	Heartland Region
1996	Plano, TX	North Texas
1997	St. Louis, MO	Gateway Chapter
1998	Danvers, MA	Minuteman Chapter
1999	Columbus, OH	Central Ohio
2000	Richmond, VA	Northern Virginia
2001	Buffalo, NY	Niagara Frontier
2002	Kokomo, IN	Indiana Chapter
2003	Flint, MI	Buicktown
2004	Plano, TX	North Texas
2005	Batavia, NY	Finger Lakes
2006	Rochester, MN	Gopher and Fireball Chapters
2007	Seattle, WA	Northern Cascade
2008	Flint, MI	Buicktown
2009	Colorado Springs, CO	Four Corners Region
2010	Ames, IA	BCA with assistance from Hawkeye and Gopher State Chapters
2011	Danvers, MA	Minuteman Chapter
2012	Concord, NC	Carolina Chapter
2013	South Bend, IN	BCA National Meet Committee
2014	Portland, OR	BCA National Meet Committee
2015	Springfield, MO	BCA National Meet Committee

=== Technical Advisors Program ===
The BCA Technical Advisory Program consist of volunteer advisors who are knowledgeable about specific Buick vehicle eras, years, models or engines and assist other members with technical questions.

== Famous members ==
- Joe Mantegna, actor
