= Oldsmobile =

Defunct entry-level luxury division of General Motors

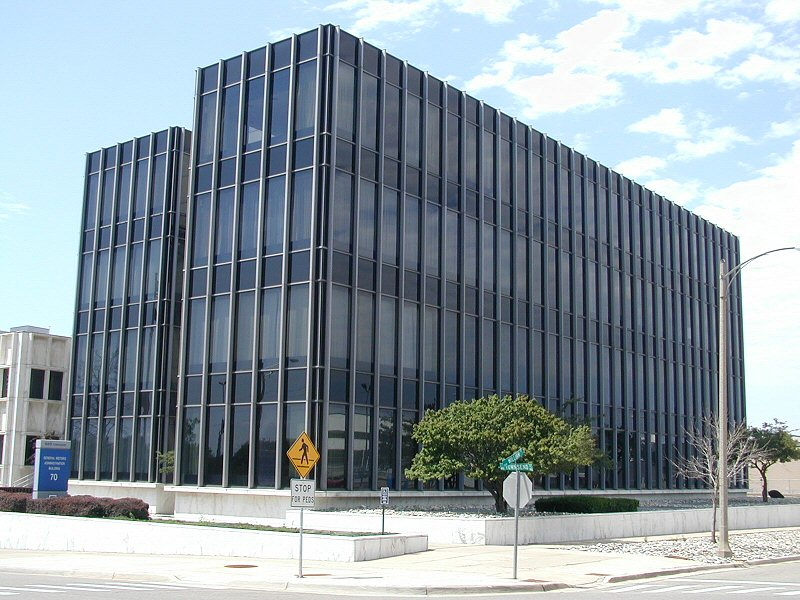
- Oldsmobile building, pictured in 2008
- Formerly: Olds Motor Vehicle Company; (1897–1899); Olds Motor Works (1899–1942)
- Type: Division
- Industry: Automotive
- Founded: August 21, 1897; 129 years ago
- Founder: Ransom E. Olds
- Defunct: April 29, 2004; 22 years ago
- Fate: Dissolved
- Headquarters: Lansing, Michigan, U.S.
- Area served: United States, Canada, Mexico, Puerto Rico
- Key people: Frederic L. Smith; Angus Smith; Irving Jacob Reuter; A. B. C. Hardy; John Beltz; C. L. McCuen
- Products: Standard and luxury automobiles
- Parent: General Motors

Oldsmobile (formally the Oldsmobile Division of General Motors) was a brand of American automobiles, produced for most of its existence by General Motors. Originally established as "Olds Motor Vehicle Company" by Ransom E. Olds in 1897, it produced over 35 million vehicles, including at least 14 million built at its Lansing, Michigan, factory alone.

During its time as a division of General Motors, Oldsmobile slotted into the middle of GM's five passenger car divisions (above Chevrolet and Pontiac, but below Buick and Cadillac). It was also noted for several groundbreaking technologies and designs.

Oldsmobile's sales peaked at over one million annually from 1983 to 1986, but by the 1990s the division faced growing competition from premium import brands, and sales steadily declined. When it shut down in 2004, Oldsmobile was the oldest surviving American automobile brand, and one of the oldest in the world. Buick, founded in 1899, was a long-standing counterpart to Oldsmobile (both sold entry/mid-level luxury cars) and succeeded Olds as the oldest American carmaker still operating.

== History ==
=== Early history ===
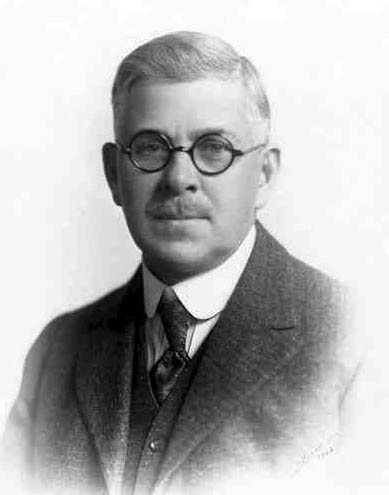
Ransom Eli Olds, the founder and namesake of Oldsmobile

Oldsmobiles were first manufactured by the Olds Motor Vehicle Company in Lansing, Michigan, a company founded by Ransom E. Olds in 1897. In 1901 (the same year that Horace and John Dodge won a contract to produce transmissions for the Olds company), the company produced 635 cars, making it the first high-volume gasoline-powered automobile manufacturer (electric car manufacturers such as Columbia Electric and steam-powered car manufacturers such as Locomobile had higher volumes a few years earlier).

Oldsmobile became the top-selling car company in the United States from 1903 to 1904. Ransom Olds left the company in 1904 because of a dispute with sales manager Frederic L. Smith, who was questioning production techniques and wanted Mr. Olds to certify that each car that left the plant was free from defects. Mr. Smith then set up an experimental engineering shop without Mr. Olds' knowledge or consent, causing Mr. Olds to leave in 1904 and form the REO Motor Car Company. This was similar to the situation Henry Ford experienced when he was forced out of the company he founded (the Henry Ford Company) before starting the Ford Motor Company in 1903.

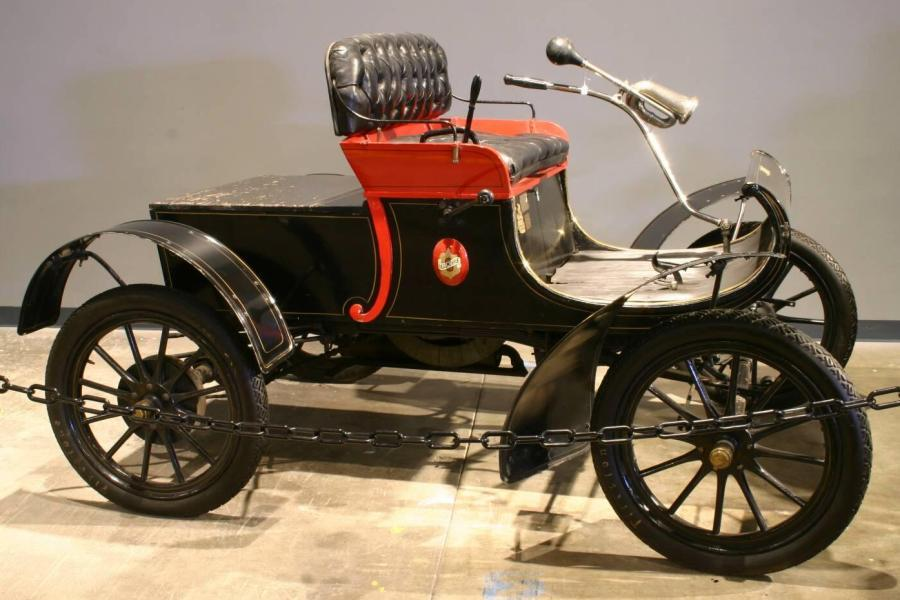
1904 Oldsmobile Model 6C "Curved-Dashboard"

The 1902 to 1907 Oldsmobile Model R "Curved Dash" was the first mass-produced car, made on a progressive moving automotive assembly line, an invention which is often incorrectly credited to Henry Ford and the Ford Motor Company. Ford was the first to manufacture cars on a continuously moving and synchronized assembly line starting in 1913, five years into Model T production. Olds' moving assembly line was manually progressed, meaning that the vehicle being assembled was manually pushed to the next workstation after the assigned assembly was performed at the previous station. This differed from hand-making vehicles in the past where various workers would work on one car until it was completed, which was labor- and time-intensive.

After Ransom Olds merged Olds Motor Vehicle Co. with the Olds Gas Engine Works in 1899, the newly formed entity was known as Olds Motor Works. The company moved to a new plant in Detroit, located at the corner of East Jefferson Avenue and MacArthur Bridge.

By March 1901, Olds Motor Works had a whole line of models ready for mass production. However, that month the factory caught fire and burned to the ground, destroying nearly all of the prototypes that were inside. The only car that survived the fire was a Curved Dash prototype, which was wheeled out of the factory by two workers as they escaped the burning building.

While the factory was being rebuilt using insurance funds, many subcontractors were used to keep production going, including Henry M. Leland for engine production and the Dodge Brothers. Olds was a strong competitor to other independent companies Buick and Cadillac before they became divisions of General Motors between 1908 and 1909. Later after Mr. Olds left the company, Oldsmobile production was moved back to Lansing.

Officially, the cars were called "Olds automobiles", but were colloquially referred to as "Oldsmobiles". It was this moniker, as applied especially to the Curved Dash Olds, that was popularized in the lyrics and title of the 1905 hit song "In My Merry Oldsmobile". The last Oldsmobile Curved Dash was made in 1907. General Motors purchased the company on November 12, 1908. When GM assumed operations, platform sharing began with Buick products and Oldsmobile shared platforms were identified with the prefix "Series" followed by a number, while models developed by pre-GM engineers were identified with the prefix "Model" followed by a letter. Early on, Oldsmobile was a competitor of Hudson, as some former engineers of Oldsmobile took positions with Hudson.

=== 1910s ===
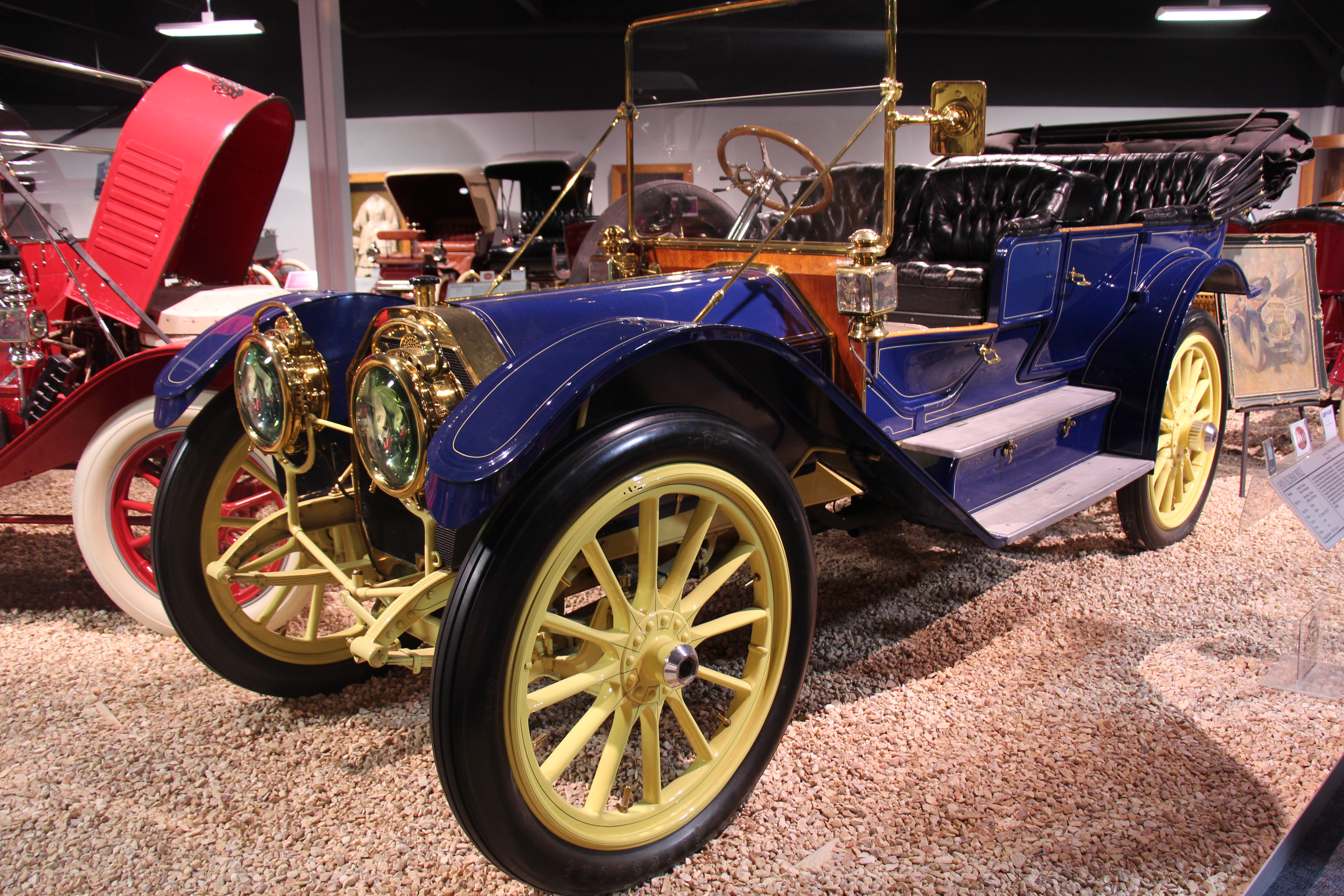
1910 Oldsmobile Limited

The 1910 Limited Touring Series 23 was an early, ambitious high point for the company. Riding atop 42-inch (1067 mm) wheels, and equipped with factory "white" tires, the Limited was the prestige model in Oldsmobile's two model lineup, with the smaller Oldsmobile Autocrat Series 32 having 36-inch wheels.

The Limited retailed for US$4,600, ($158,946 in 2025 dollars) an amount greater than the price of a new basic three-bedroom house. Buyers received goatskin upholstery, a 60 hp (45 kW) 707 CID (11.6 L) T-head straight-six engine, Bosch Magneto starter, running boards and room for five. Options included a speedometer, clock, and full glass windshield. A limousine version was priced at $5,800 ($200,411 in 2025 dollars). While Oldsmobile only sold 725 Limiteds in its three years of production, the car is best remembered for winning a race against the famed 20th Century Limited train, an event immortalized in the painting Setting the Pace by William Hardner Foster.

The Limited was at the time considered technologically advanced and cutting edge, if on the expensive side, but it established the division's reputation for innovation. The Oldsmobile Series 40 was offered in 1912 and was considerably more affordable and smaller, and later the company released the Oldsmobile Light Eight. In 1916, Oldsmobile offered a Northway-designed flathead V8 engine until 1923, while Buick remained with their division's exclusive overhead valve straight-six engine until 1930.

Beginning in 1910, bodywork was supplied by Fisher Body, a longstanding tradition that led to the company being eventually merged into GM in later years.

=== 1920s ===
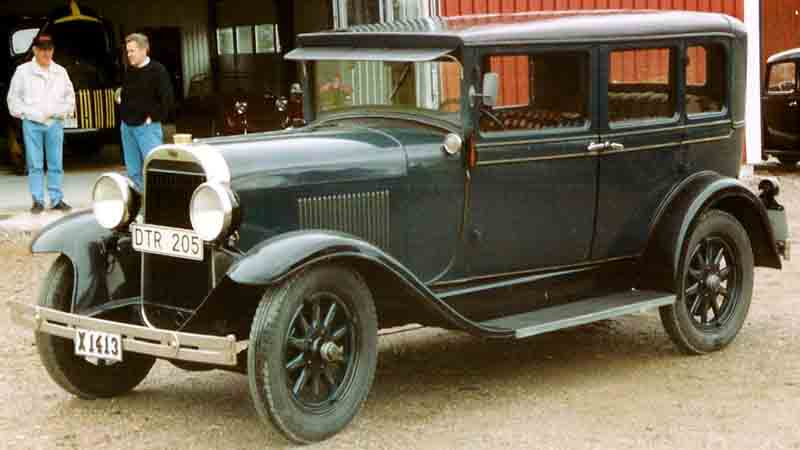
1928 Oldsmobile 6 (Model F-28) 4-door sedan

In 1926, the Oldsmobile Six came in five body styles, and ushered in a new GM bodystyle platform called the "GM B platform", shared with Buick products.

In 1929, as part of General Motors' companion make program, Oldsmobile introduced the higher standard Viking brand, marketed through the Oldsmobile dealer network. Viking was already discontinued at the end of the 1930 model year although an additional 353 cars were marketed as 1931 models.

=== 1930s ===
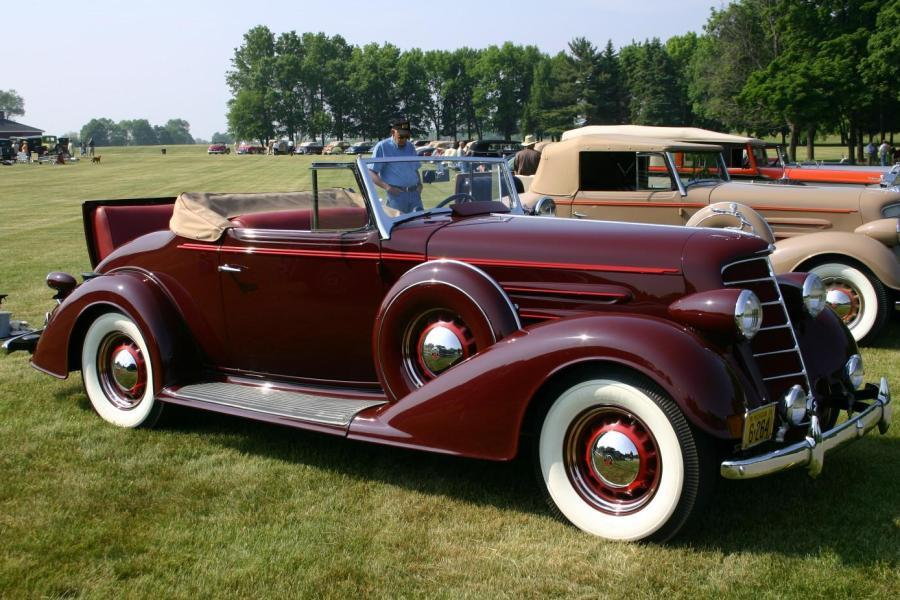
1934 Oldsmobile 8 convertible coupe (Model L-34)

In the 1930s, Oldsmobile produced two body styles of automobile, the Series F (straight-6 cylinder) and the longer Series L (straight-8 cylinder). In 1933 The Oldsmobile Program appeared on CBS radio for two years which was a new advertising approach to sell products and services.

In 1937, Oldsmobile was a pioneer in introducing a four-speed semi-automatic transmission called the "Automatic Safety Transmission", although this accessory was actually built by Buick, which would offer it in its own cars in 1938. This transmission features a conventional clutch pedal, which the driver presses before selecting either "low" or "high" range. In "low", the car shifts between first and second gears. In "high", the car shifts among first, third and fourth gears.

=== 1940s ===
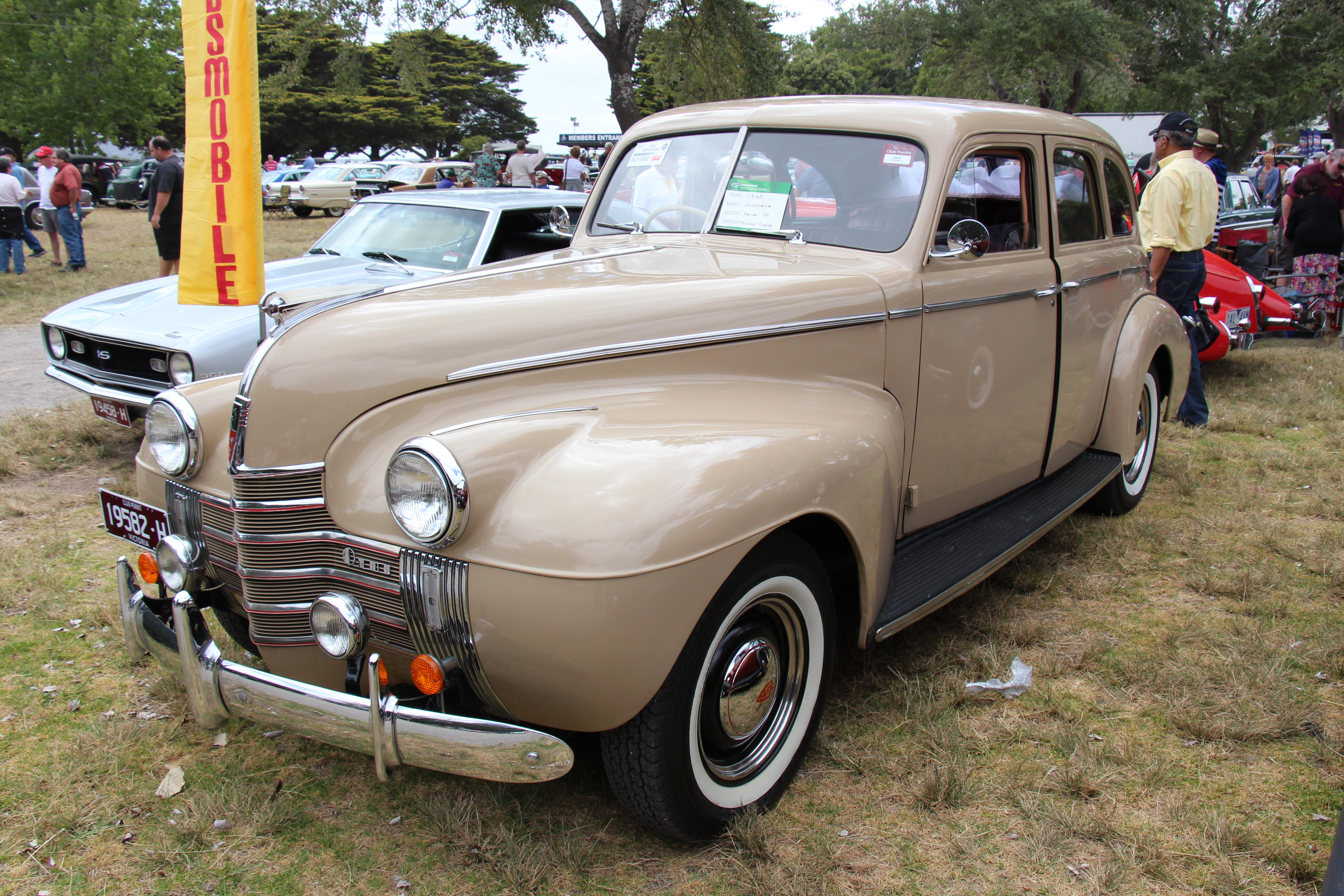
1940 Oldsmobile Series 70

For the 1940 model, Oldsmobile was the first auto manufacturer to offer a fully automatic transmission, called the "Hydramatic", which features four forward speeds. It has a gas pedal and a brake – no clutch pedal. The gear selector is on the steering column.

Starting in 1941 and continuing through 1999, Oldsmobile used a two-digit model designation. As originally implemented, the first digit signifies the body size while the second represents the number of cylinders. Body sizes were 6, 7, 8, and 9, and straight six- and straight eight-cylinder engines were offered. Thus, Oldsmobiles were named "66" through "98".

Until January 1, 1942, the Division was still known by the still official name of Olds Motor Works, when it was changed to the collective name the cars were known as, "Oldsmobiles". Thus, the division was officially christened the Oldsmobile Division of General Motors. The last pre-war Oldsmobile rolled off the assembly line on February 5, 1942. During World War II, Oldsmobile produced numerous kinds of material for the war effort, including large-caliber guns and shells. Production resumed on October 15, 1945, with a warmed-over 1942 model serving as the offering for 1946.

Oldsmobile once again was a pioneer when, for the 1949 model, the Rocket engine was introduced, which used an overhead valve V8 design rather than the flathead "straight-eight" design which prevailed at the time. The overhead valve was originally exclusive to Buick as they invented the technology and offered it on all of their products. This engine produced far more power than the other engines that were popular during that era, and found favor with hot-rodders and stock car racers. The basic design, with a few minor changes, endured until Oldsmobile redesigned its V8 engines in the mid-1960s.

=== 1950s ===
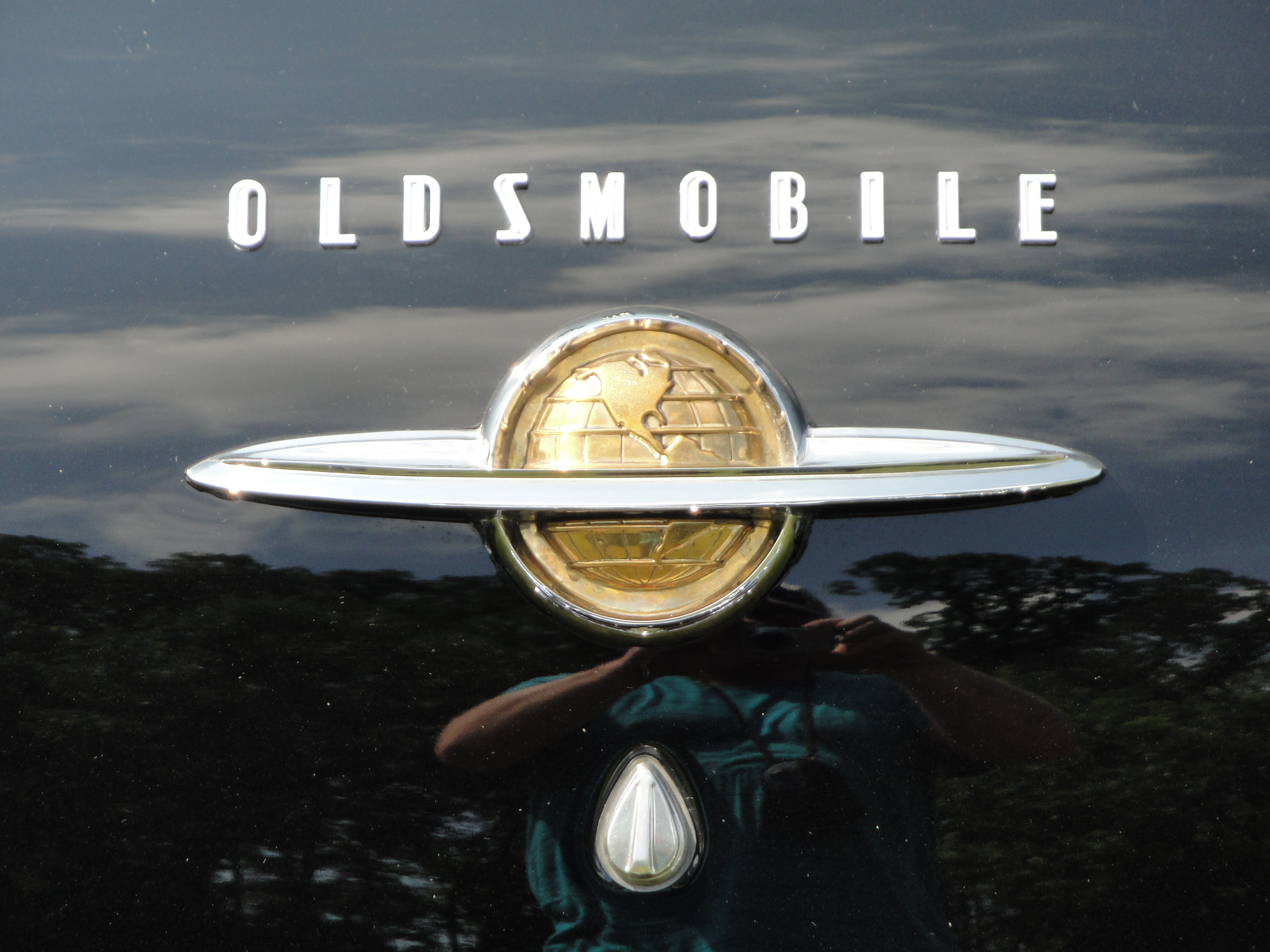
1950 Oldsmobile 88 badge

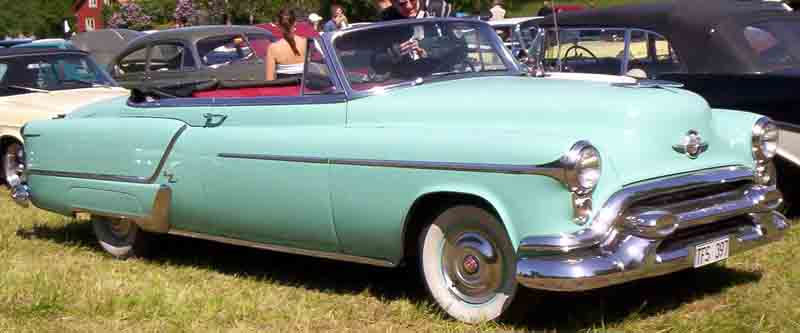
1953 Oldsmobile 98 convertible

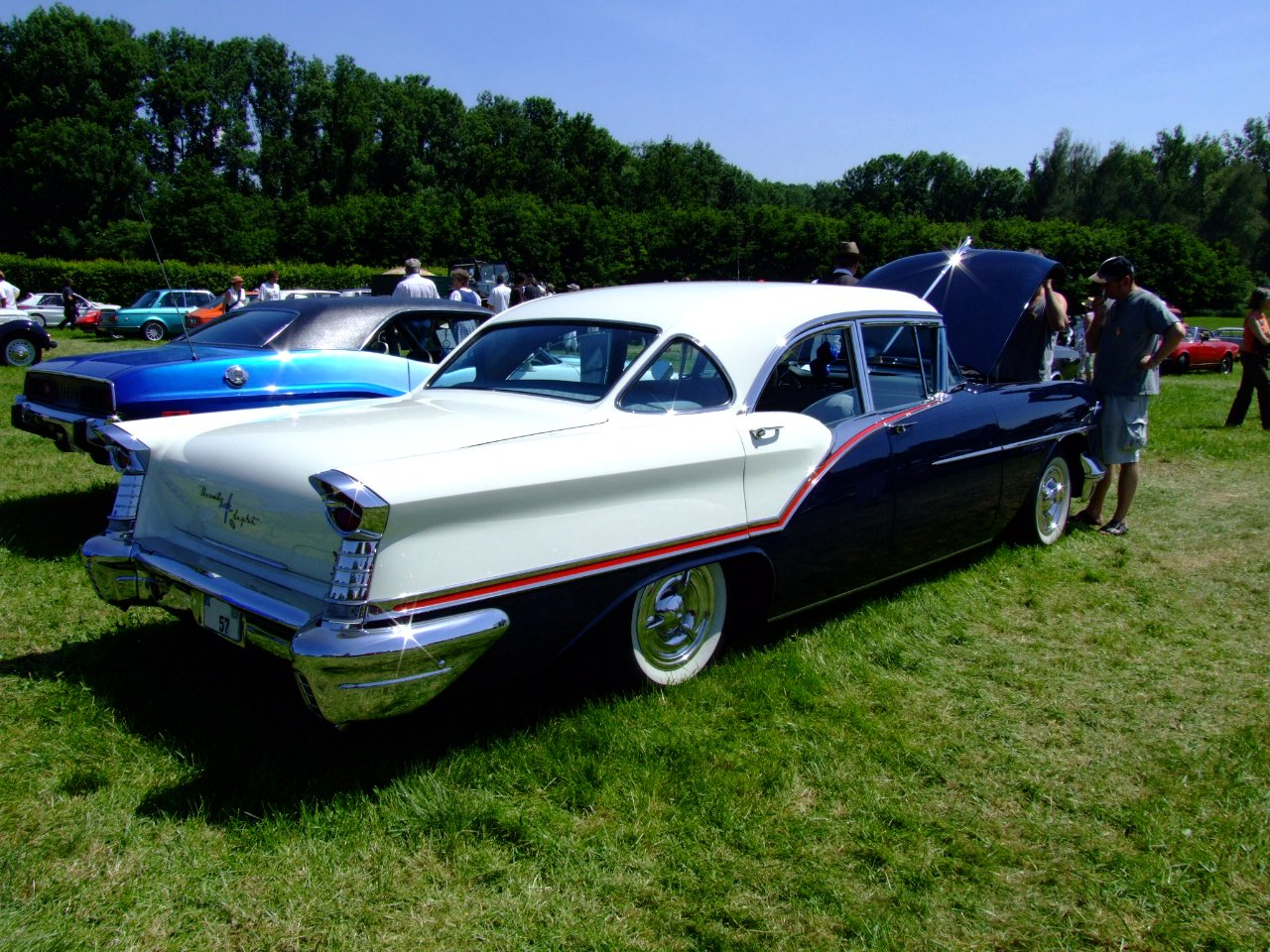
1957 Oldsmobile Starfire 98 Holiday sedan with "StratoRoof" rear window

Oldsmobile entered the 1950s following a divisional image campaign centered on its 'Rocket' engines and the Space Race, and its cars' appearance followed suit. Oldsmobile's Rocket V8 engine was the leader in performance; its cars were generally considered the fastest on the market; and by the mid-1950s their styling was among the first to offer a wide, "open maw" grille, suggestive of fighter jet propulsion. From 1948 to 1957, Oldsmobile adopted a ringed-globe emblem depicting North America to stress what marketers felt was its universal appeal. Starting in 1958, the grille logo changed again to reflect the rocket image, that was used throughout the late 1950s, the make used twin jet pod-styled taillights as a nod to its "Rocket" theme. Oldsmobile was among the first of General Motors' divisions to receive a true hardtop in 1950 called the "Holiday coupe" (Buick's version was called the "Riviera", and Cadillac's was called the "Coupe De Ville"), and it was also among the first divisions (along with Buick and Cadillac) to receive a wraparound windshield, a trend that eventually all American makes would share at sometime between 1953 and 1964. New for 1954 on 98 coupes and convertibles (Starfire) would be front and rear "sweep cut" fender styling, which would not show up on a Chevrolet until 1956 and not until 1957 on a Pontiac. 1953 models changed to a 12 volt electrical system that made starting easier.

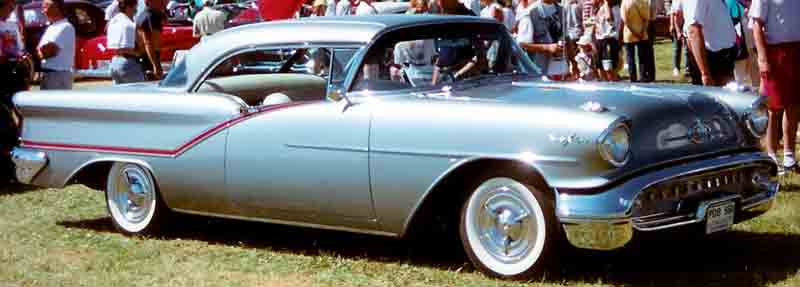
1957 Oldsmobile Starfire Ninety-Eight Holiday coupe

In the 1950s the nomenclature changed again, and trim levels also received names that were then mated with the model numbers. This resulted in the Oldsmobile 88 emerging as base Dynamic 88 and the highline Super 88. Other full-size model names included the "Holiday" used on hardtops, and "Fiesta" used on its station wagons. When the 88 was retired in 1999 (with a Fiftieth Anniversary Edition), its length of service was the longest model name used on American cars after the Chrysler New Yorker. Mid-1955 also saw the introduction of the four-door Holiday pillarless hardtop, the industry's first (along with Buick).

General Motors' styling as a whole lost its frontrunner status in 1957 when Chrysler introduced Virgil Exner's "forward look" designs. When compared side to side, Oldsmobile looked dated next to its price-point competitors DeSoto and Mercury. Compounding the problem for Oldsmobile and Buick was a styling mistake which GM called the "StratoRoof", which was reminiscent of the "greenhouse" canopy used on the Convair B-36 Peacemaker high altitude bomber. Both makes had models which contained the heavily framed rear window, but Detroit had been working with large curved backlights for almost a decade. Consumers disliked the roof and its blind spots, forcing GM to rush a redesign into production on some of its models. Oldsmobile's only off year in the 1950s was 1958. The nation was beginning to feel the results of its first significant post-war recession, and US automobile sales were down for the model year. Oldsmobile, Buick and Cadillac received a heavy-handed makeover of the 1957 GM designs. The Oldsmobile that emerged in 1958 bore little resemblance to the design of its forerunners; instead the car emerged as a large, over-decorated "chromemobile" which many felt had overly ostentatious styling.

Up front, all 1958 Oldsmobile's received one of General Motors' heavily styled front facias and quad-headlights. Streaking back from the edge of the headlights was a broad belt consisting of two strips of chrome on regular 88s, three strips on Super 88s, and three strips (top and bottom thin, inside thick) on 98s that ended in a point at mid-body. The bottom of the rear fender featured a thick stamping of a half tube that pointed forward, atop which was a chrome assembly of four horizontal chrome speed-lines that terminated into a vertical bar. The tail of the car featured massive vertical chrome taillight housings. Two chrome stars were fitted to the trunklid.

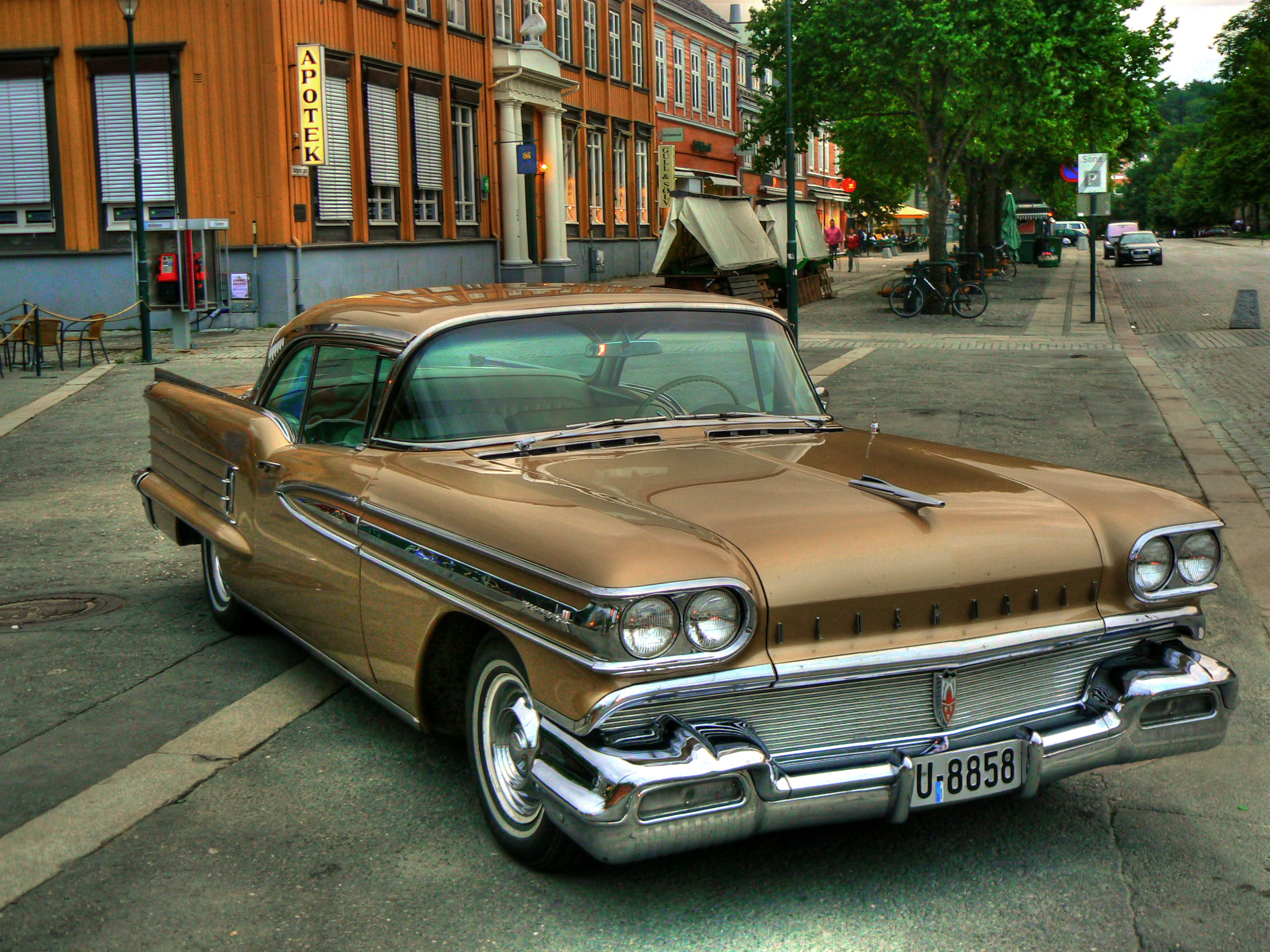
1958 Oldsmobile Super 88 Holiday coupe

Ford styling consultant Alex Tremulis (designer of the 1948 Tucker sedan) mocked the 1958 Oldsmobile by drawing cartoons of the car, and placing musical notes in the rear trim assembly. Another Detroit stylist employed by Ford bought a used 1958 Oldsmobile in the early 1960s, driving it daily to work. He detached and rearranged the Oldsmobile lettering above the grille to spell out slobmodel as a reminder to himself and co-workers of what "bad" auto design meant to their business.

In 1959, Oldsmobile models were completely redesigned with a rocket motif from front to rear, as the top of the front fenders had a chrome rocket, while the body-length fins were shaped as rocket exhausts which culminated in a fin-top taillight (concave on the 98 models while convex on the 88 models). The 1959 models also offered several roof treatments, such as the pillared sedan with a fastback rear window and the Holiday SportSedan, which was a flat-roofed pillarless hardtop with wraparound front and rear glass. The 1959 models were marketed as "the linear look", and also featured a bar-graph speedometer which showed a green indicator through 35 miles per hour (56 km/h), then changed to orange until 65 miles per hour (105 km/h), then was red above that until the highest speed read by the speedometer, 120 miles per hour (190 km/h). Power windows were available on the 98 models, as were two-speed electric windshield wipers with electrically powered windshield washers. The 88 still relied on vacuum-operated windshield wipers without a washer feature. 1959 Oldsmobiles were offered with "Autronic Eye" (a dashboard-mounted automatic headlight dimmer) as well as factory-installed air conditioning and power-operated front bench seat as available options. The 1959 body style was continued through the 1960 model year, but the fins were toned down for 1960 and the taillights were moved to the bottom of the fenders.

=== 1960s ===
From 1948 until 2004, Oldsmobile used a variety of logos employing a rocket theme that played off its Rocket line of V-8 engines. This image is stylistic variation of a rocket sitting on a launchpad.

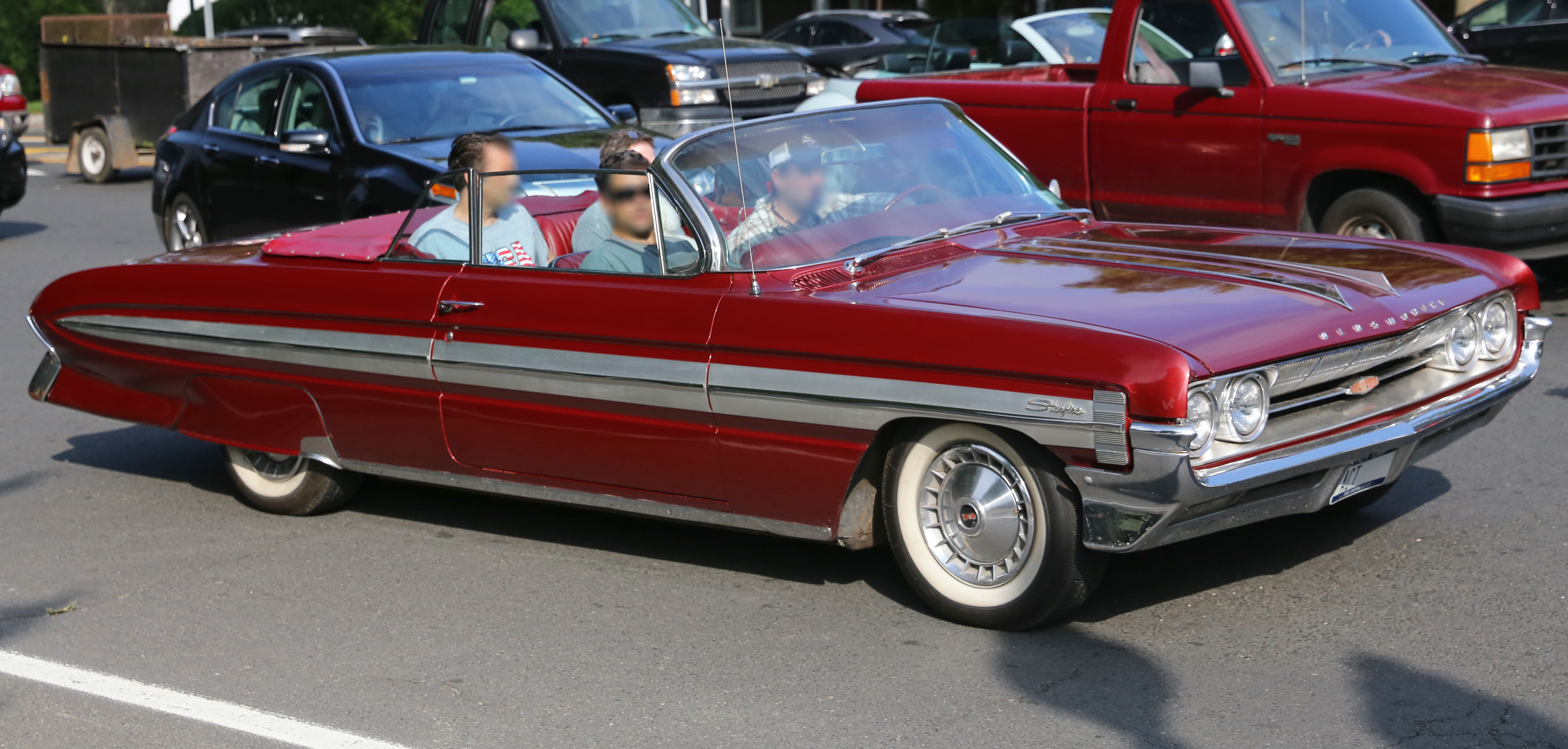
Oldsmobile Starfire (1961)

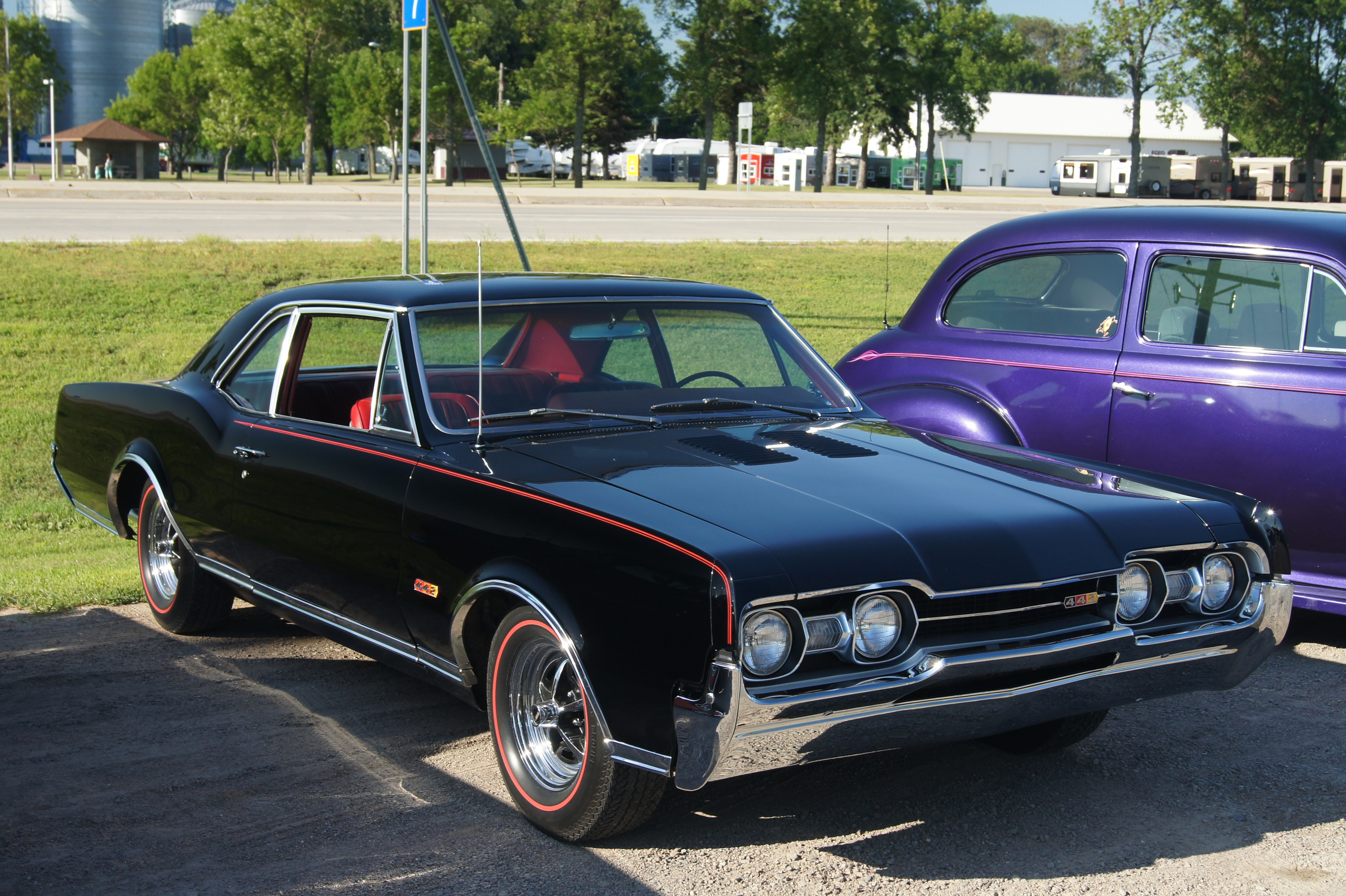
1967 Oldsmobile 442 sport coupe

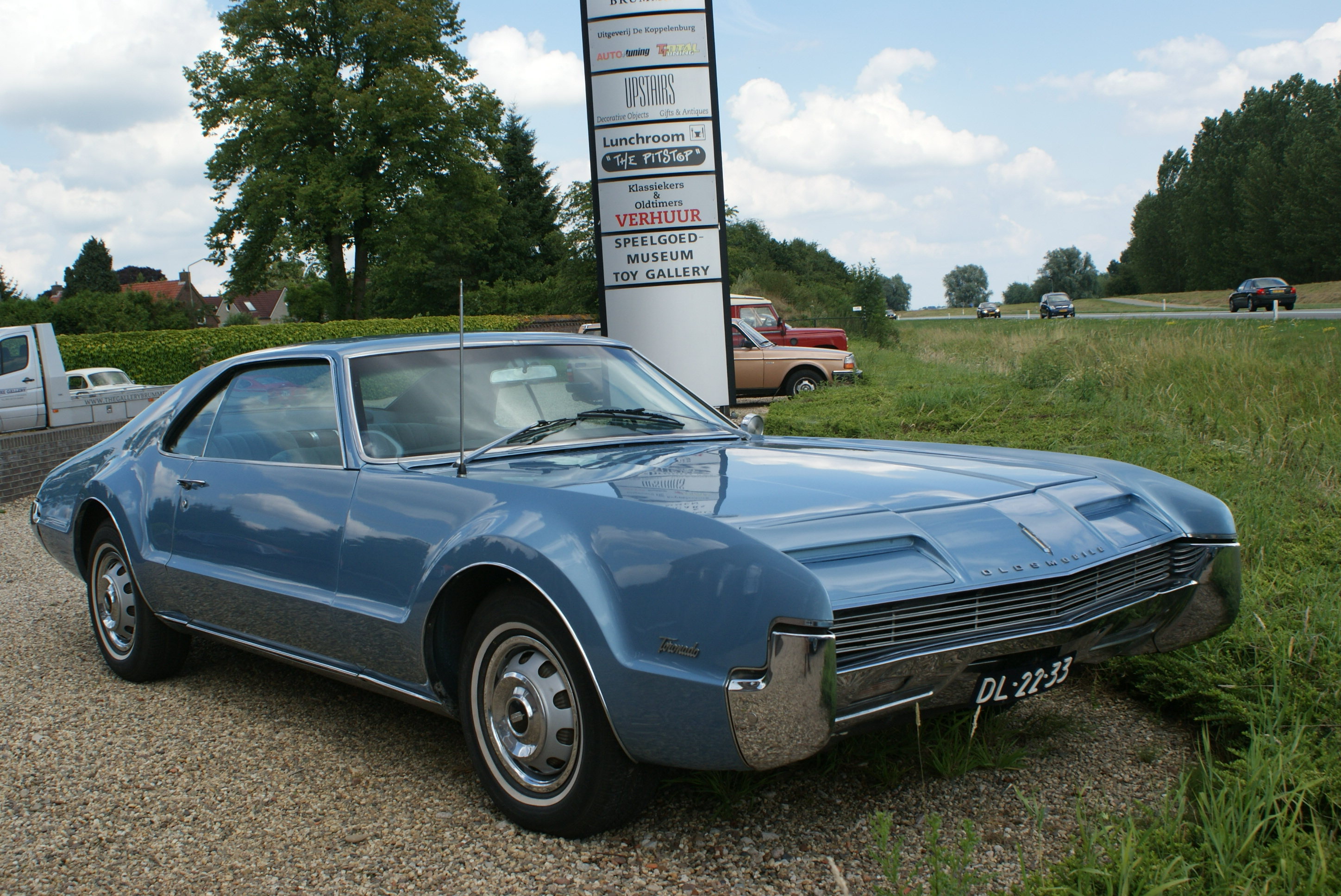
1966 Oldsmobile Toronado

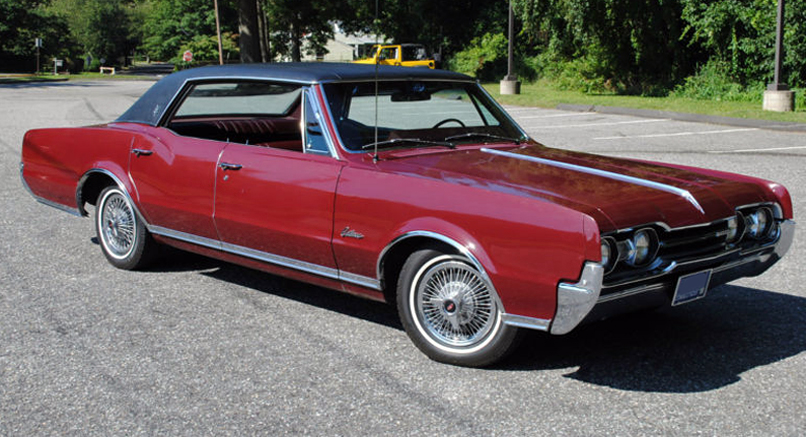
1967 Oldsmobile Cutlass

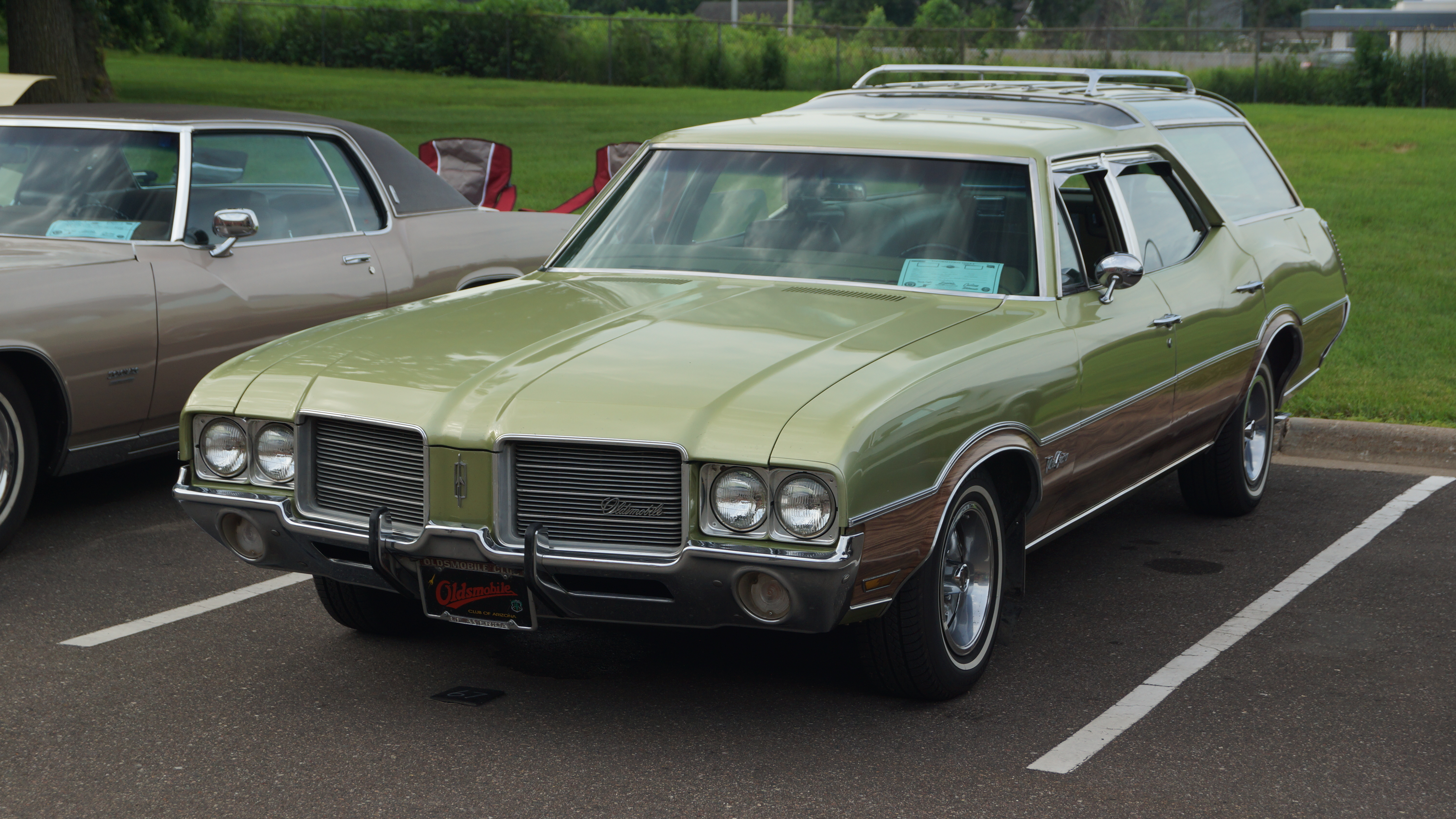
1971 Oldsmobile Vista Cruiser

Notable achievements for Oldsmobile in the 1960s included the introduction of the first turbocharged engine and a factory water injection system in 1962 (the Turbo Jetfire), the first modern front-wheel drive car produced in the United States (the 1966 Toronado), the Vista Cruiser station wagon (noted for its roof glass), and the upscale 442 muscle car. Olds briefly used the names "Jetstar 88" (1964–1966) and Delmont 88 (1967–1968) on its least expensive full-size models in the 1960s. In 1968 the split grille appearance was introduced and remained a traditional feature until production ended in 2004.

Notable models for the 1960s:

- Oldsmobile 442 – began as a 1964 muscle car option package (4-barrel carburetor, 4-speed manual transmission, and 2 exhausts) on the F-85/Cutlass. In 1965, to better compete with the Pontiac GTO, the original 330 CID V8 rated at 310 hp (231 kW) was replaced by a new 400 CID V8 rated at 345 hp (257 kW). The 442 definition was changed to "4" hundred CID V8 engine, "4"-barrel carburetor, and "2" exhaust pipes, and was named by "Car Craft Nationals" as the "top car of 1965". In 1968 the 442 became its own model and got a larger, 455 CID (7.5 L), V8 engine in 1970.
- Oldsmobile Cutlass (1961–1999) – mid-size car. Oldsmobile's best seller in the 1970s and 1980s, and in some of those years America's best-selling car. In 1966 a top-line Cutlass Supreme was introduced as a four-door hardtop sedan with a more powerful 320 hp (239 kW) 330 CID Jetfire Rocket V8 than the regular F-85/Cutlass models, a more luxurious interior and other trimmings. In 1967 the Cutlass Supreme was expanded to a full series also including two-door hardtop and pillared coupes, a convertible and a four-door pillared sedan. It also came with a 6.6L 400 CID engine as an option in 1967.
- Oldsmobile F-85 (1961–1972) – compact sedan, coupe and station wagon powered by a 215 CID aluminum block V8 engine from 1961 to 1963. In 1964 the F-85 was upgraded to an intermediate-sized car and the aluminum V8 was replaced by conventional cast-iron six-cylinder and V8 engines. The Cutlass was initially the top model of the F-85 line but became a separate model by 1965 with the F-85 nameplate continued only on the lowest-priced models through the 1972 model year, after which all Oldsmobile intermediates were Cutlasses.
- Oldsmobile Vista Cruiser (1964–1977) – a stretched wheelbase Cutlass station wagon, which was stretched to 120" from 115" in the 1964-67 models and to 121" from 116" in the 1968–72 models, the stretched area being in the second-row seating area. This car featured an elevated roof over the rear seat and cargo area and glass skylights over the rear seating area, which consisted of a transverse skylight over the second seat (two-piece from 1964 to 1967, one-piece from 1968 to 1972) and small longitudinal skylights directly over the rear cargo-area windows, and also featured standard second-row sunvisors. The three-seat models featured forward-facing seating, at a time when most three-seat station wagons had the third row of seats facing the rear. From 1965 to 1970, it would be Oldsmobile's flagship station wagon, as no full-sized wagons were produced. The third-generation 1973–77 models no longer had skylights other than an optional front-row pop-up sunroof. This car was merely an up-line trim package on the Cutlass Supreme wagon and carried the Vista Cruiser nameplate rather than the Cutlass nameplate. The optional third seat was rear-facing in the third-generation Vista Cruiser.
- Oldsmobile Starfire (1961–1966) – a sporty and luxurious hardtop coupe and convertible based on the 88. The Starfire featured interiors with leather bucket seats and a center console with floor shifter, along with a standard Hydra-Matic transmission, power steering and brakes (and power windows and seats on convertibles). It was powered by Oldsmobile's most powerful Rocket V8 engine, a 394 CID engine from 1961 to 1964 rated from 330 to 345 hp (257 kW), and a larger 425 CID Super Rocket V8 from 1965 to 1966, rated at 375 hp (280 kW).
- Oldsmobile Jetstar I (1964–1966) – life for the somewhat obscure Jetstar I started in 1964. It was designed to be a low-cost option to the successful full size Starfire series – more of a direct competitor to the Pontiac Grand Prix. Standard equipment included the 345 hp (257 kW) 394ci Starfire engine, vinyl bucket seats and console. Keeping the "sport" part of the Starfire, it possessed less of the luxury and glitz. It weighed in at 4028 pounds, and 16,084 were produced for 1964. It was a Starfire without the frills and was informally dubbed "the poor man's Starfire". Proving to be an ill-fated model, 1965 concluded the 2-year run for the Jetstar I. Only 6,552 were sold. The introduction of the Pontiac GTO and Oldsmobile 4-4-2 in 1964 insured the future of the musclecars were the intermediates, and the front-drive Toronado loomed big in Oldsmobile's future taking over the flagship status from the Starfire. Further confused with its lesser brethren with the Jetstar 88 nameplate, there was no way but out for the Jetstar I. And close examination of prices revealed that unless one bought a sparsely optioned JS1, there was little financial incentive to buy a JS1 over the Starfire. But lost in the mix was a high-performance car in the '65 Jetstar I. Trimmed down to 3963#, the '65 model was an overlooked performance car. The new 370 hp (276 kW) 425ci Starfire engine delivered 470 lb⋅ft (637 N⋅m) of torque, was durable, and was quite an improvement over the '64 394. The new Oldsmobile Turbo Hydra-Matic transmission was a vast performance improvement over the previous "slim-jim" Hydra-Matic transmission. Also, Oldsmobile offered the Muncie 4-speed with Hurst shifter in '65. Oldsmobile boasted in a 1965 press release that "a Jetstar I proved to be the top accelerator of the entire event" at the 1965 Pure Oil Performance Trials in Daytona beach. Those trials were sanctioned and supervised by NASCAR. Note: between 1964 and 1966, Oldsmobile named its least expensive full size model the Oldsmobile Jetstar 88 which the Jetstar I was not related to, and priced $500–$600 below the Jetstar I.
- Oldsmobile Delta 88 (1949–1999) While the "88" series of Oldsmobile's date back to the 1940s, and were offered in a variety of trim levels, the introduction of the Delta 88, which superseded the Super 88 line as Olds' mid-level full-sized vehicles, was a watershed event for the division. Better trimmed than the low price Dynamic 88 range, but available in a wider range of body styles than the Super 88 had been, the Delta range was an immediate hit with car buyers. It quickly overshadowed the Dynamic 88 line. To pump life into the Dynamic 88 range, Oldsmobile renamed it the Delmont 88 for 1967. However, the Delta continued to climb in popularity to the point where Oldsmobile dropped the Delmont range at the end of the 1968 model run. Eventually the Delta 88 was joined by the Delta 88 Royale, a premium trimmed Delta. The Delta continued to be Oldsmobile's most popular full size line. In an attempt to modernize marketing efforts as Oldsmobile's fortunes declined, the "Delta" name was dropped in 1989, but the car lived on as the Eighty-Eight until Oldsmobile ended its production in 1999.
- Oldsmobile Toronado (1966–1992) – a front-wheel-drive coupe in the personal luxury car category, introduced in 1966. At the time, the largest and most powerful front-wheel-drive car ever produced, and one of the first modern front-wheel-drive cars equipped with an automatic transmission. The original Toronado was powered by a 425 CID Super Rocket V8 engine rated at 385 hp (287 kW), mated to a three-speed Turbo Hydra-Matic transmission. The Toronado was Motor Trend magazine's 1966 "car of the year".

=== 1970s–1980s ===
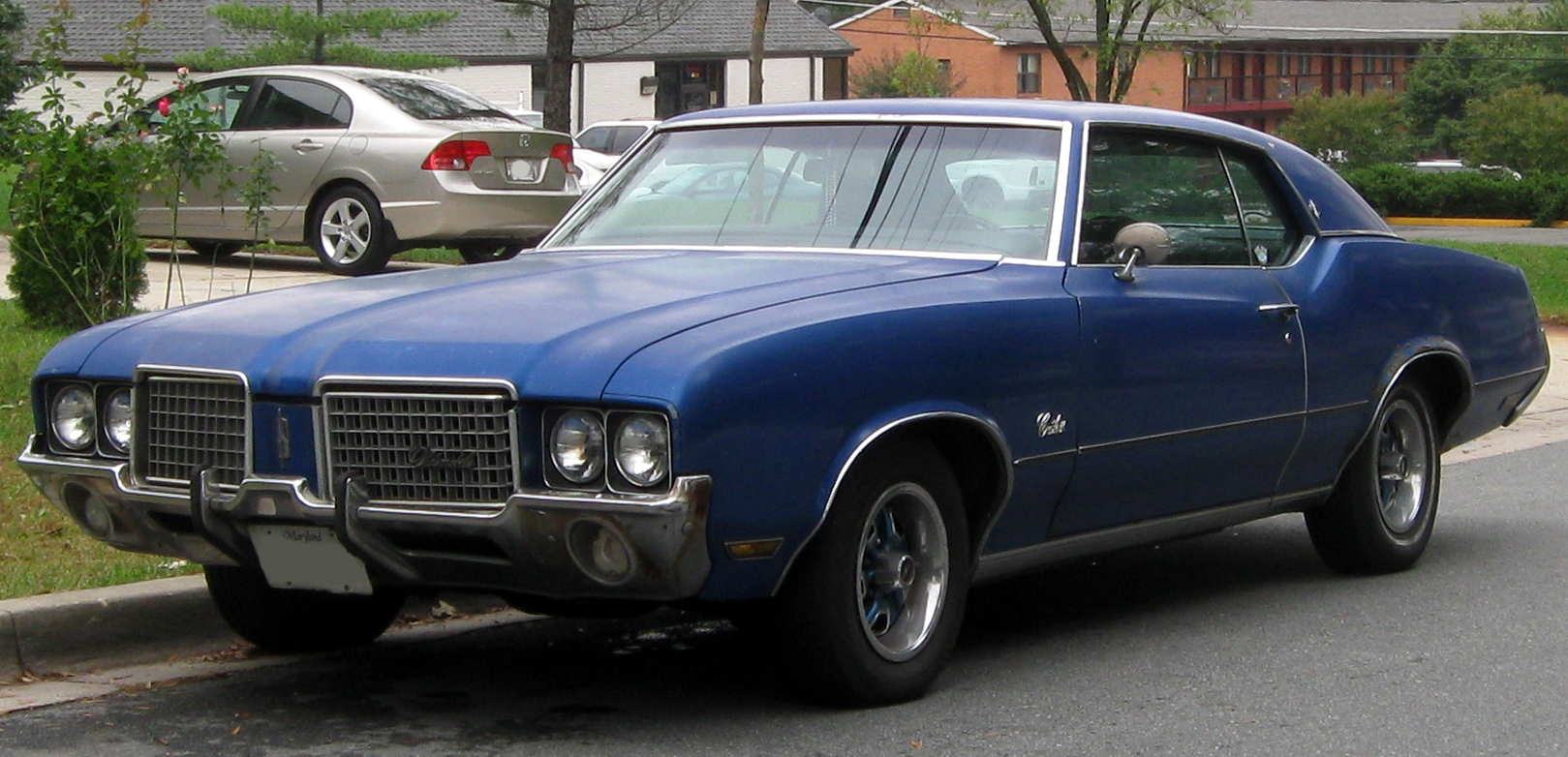
1972 Oldsmobile Cutlass Supreme

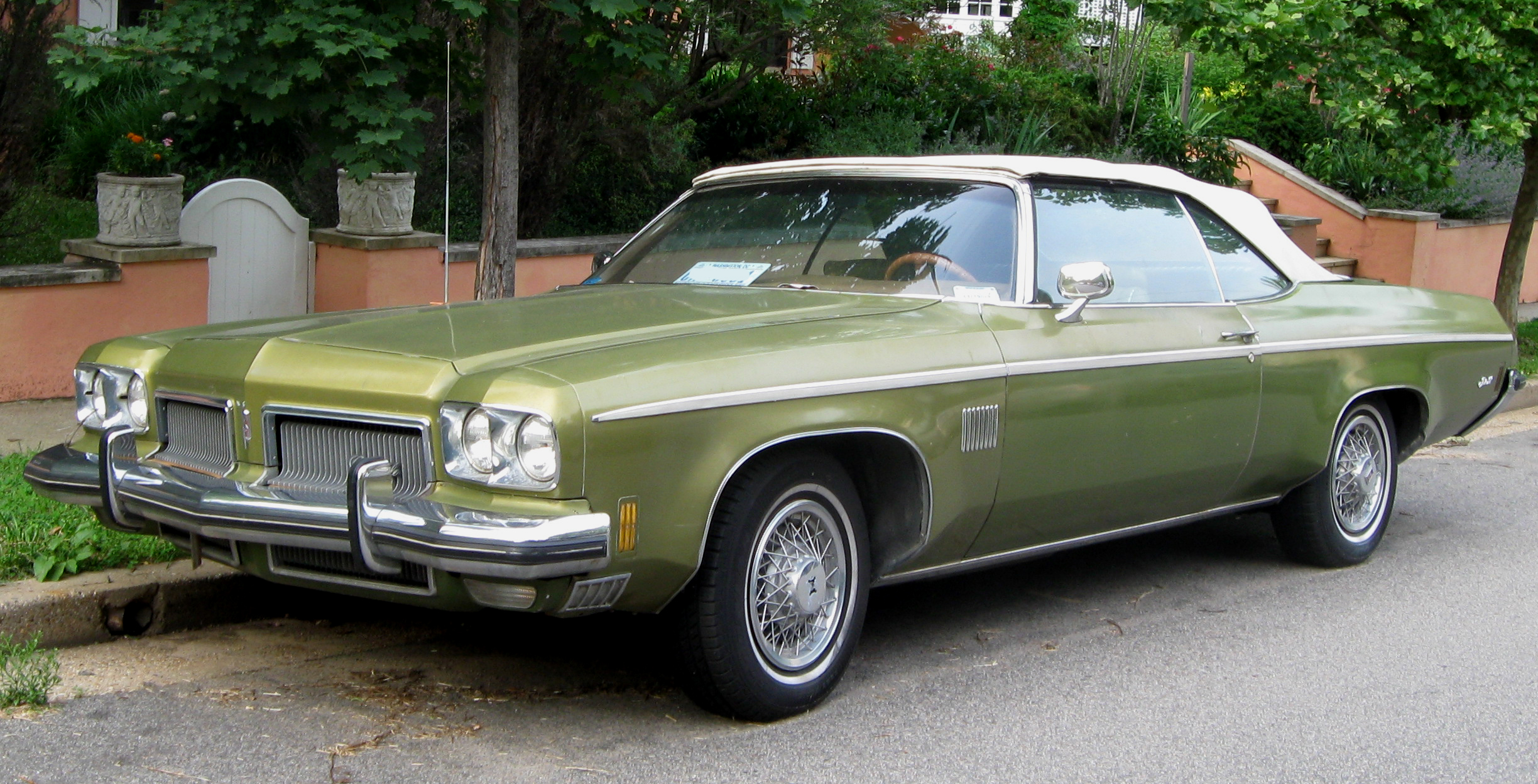
1973 Oldsmobile Delta 88 Convertible

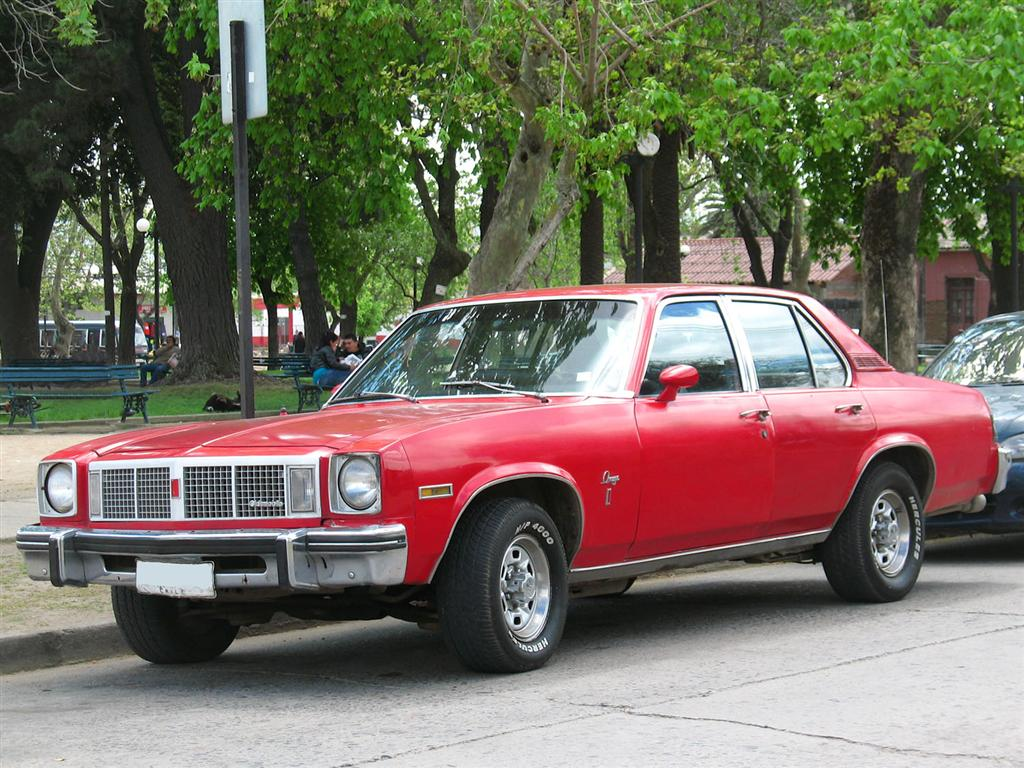
1977 Oldsmobile Omega sedan

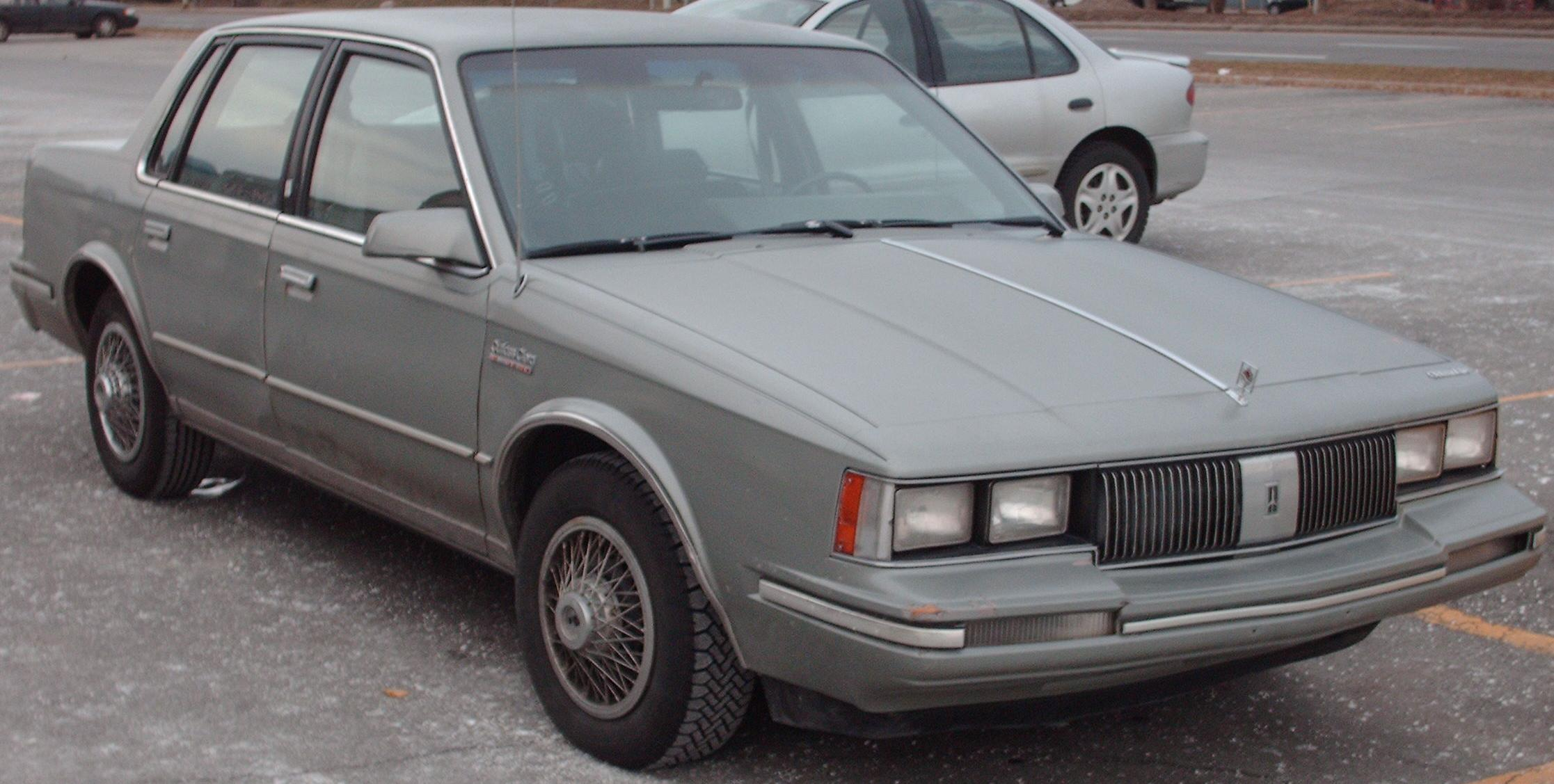
1982 Oldsmobile Cutlass Ciera

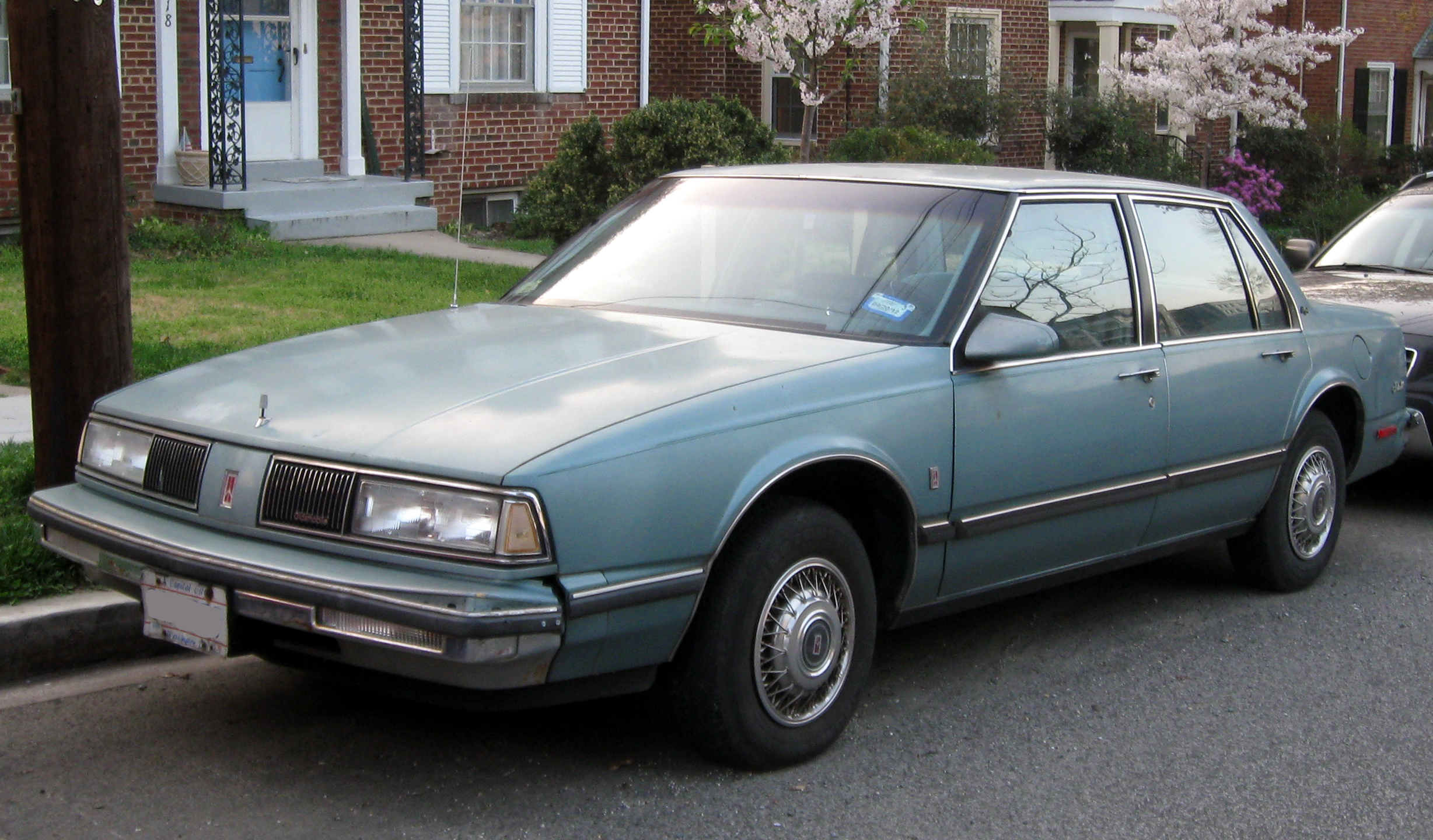
1987 Oldsmobile Delta 88

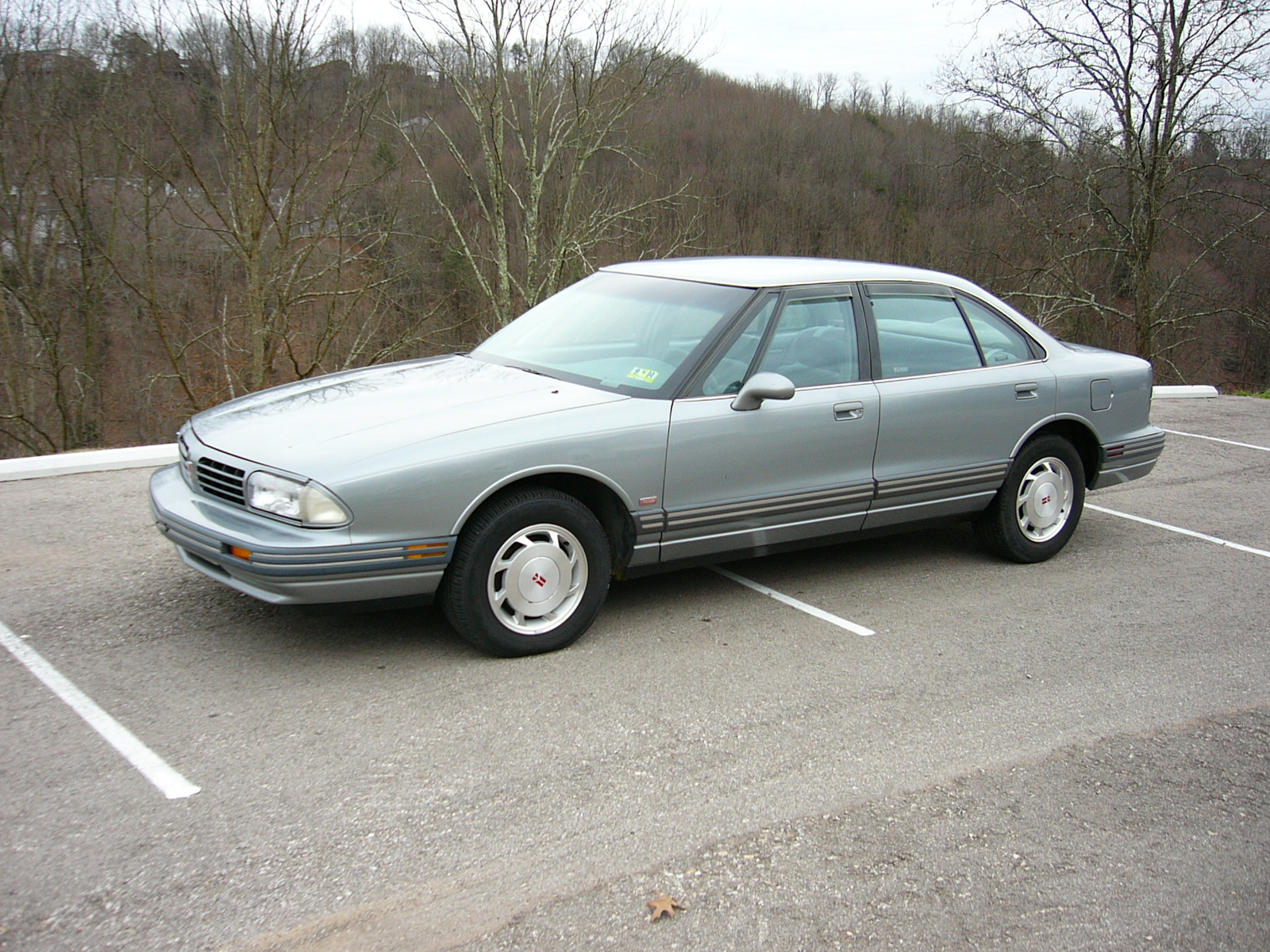
1994 Oldsmobile Eighty-Eight Royale

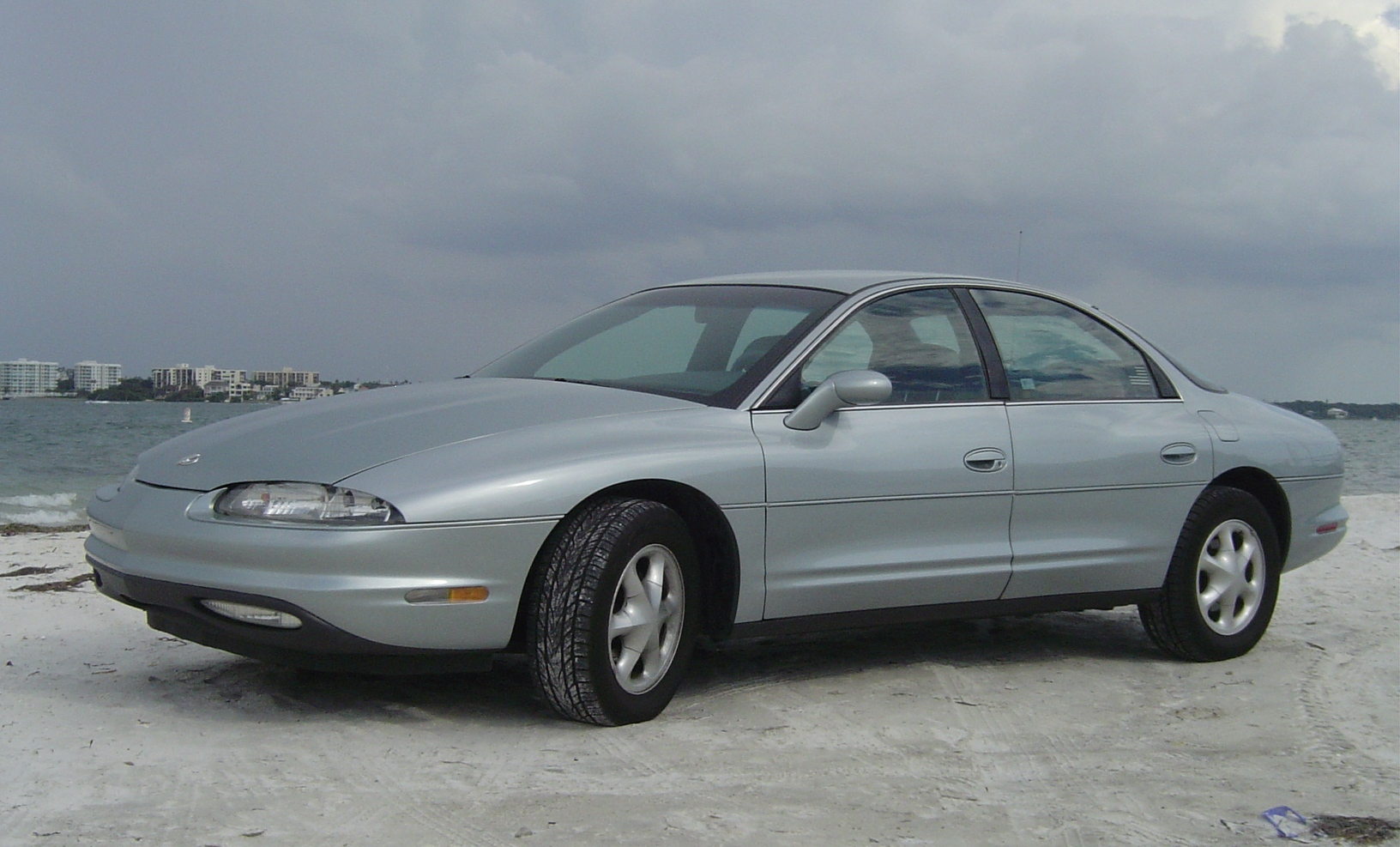
First Generation Oldsmobile Aurora

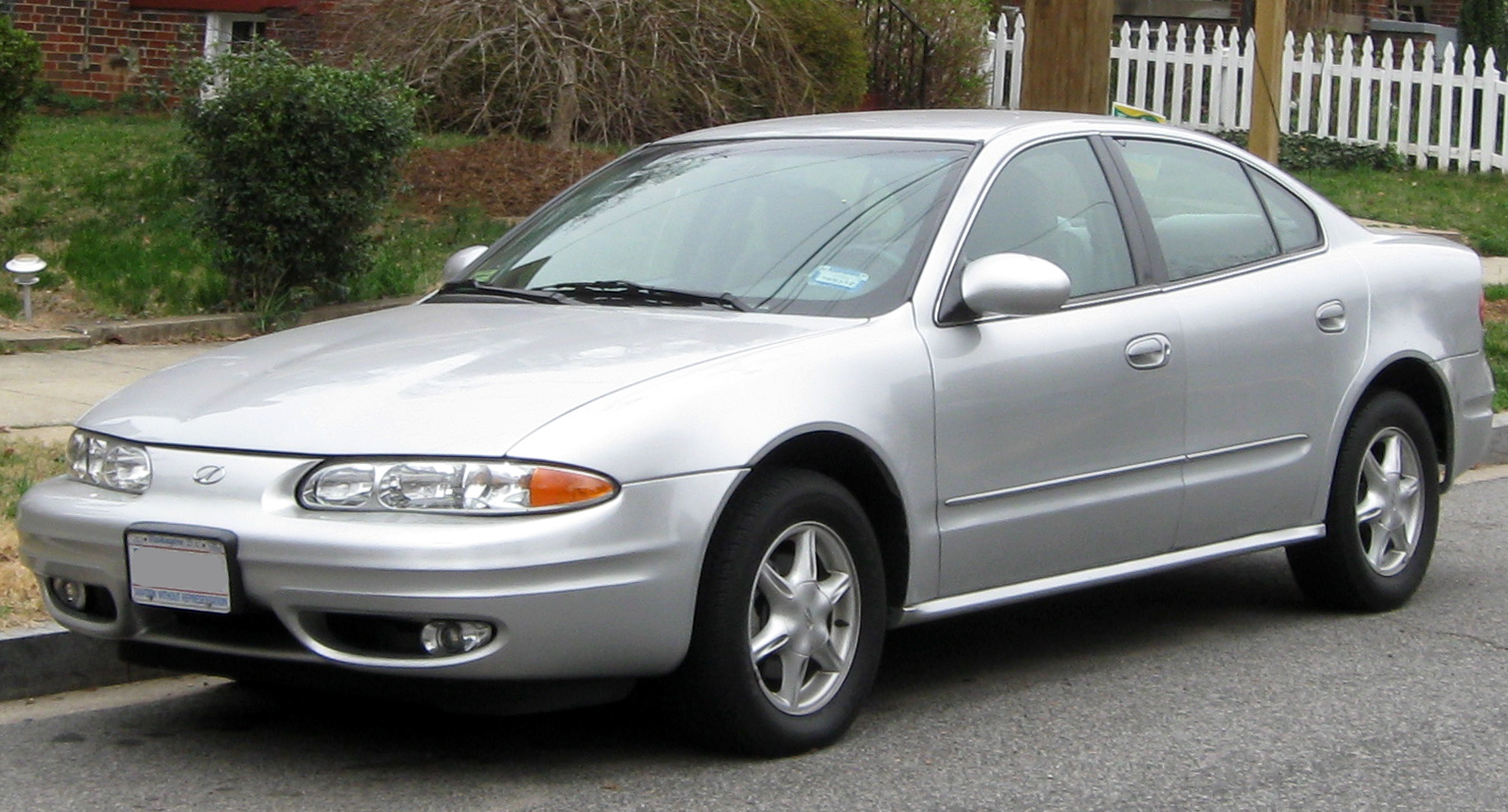
Oldsmobile Alero

The 1970s and 1980s were good years for the Oldsmobile division; sales soared (reaching an all-time high of 1,066,122 in 1985) based on popular designs, positive reviews from critics, and perceived quality and reliability, with the Cutlass series becoming North America's top-selling car by 1976. By this time, Olds had displaced Pontiac and Plymouth as the third best-selling brand in the U.S. behind Chevrolet and Ford. In the late 1970s and again in the mid-1980s, model-year production topped one million units, something only Chevrolet and Ford had achieved.

The very popularity of Oldsmobile's cars created a problem for the division in the late 1970s, however. At that time, each General Motors division produced its own V8 engines, and in 1977, Oldsmobile, Chevrolet, Pontiac, and Buick each produced a unique 350-cubic-inch displacement V8. It was during the 1977 model year that demand exceeded production capacity for the Oldsmobile V8 and as a result, Oldsmobile began equipping most full-size Delta 88 models (those with Federal emissions specifications) with the Chevrolet 350 engine instead. Although it was widely debated whether there was a difference in quality or performance between the two engines, there was no question that the engines were different from one another. Many customers were loyal Oldsmobile buyers who specifically wanted the Rocket V8, and did not discover that their vehicle had the Chevrolet engine until they performed maintenance and discovered that purchased parts did not fit. This became a public relations nightmare for GM.

Following this debacle, disclaimers stating that "Oldsmobiles are equipped with engines produced by various GM divisions" were tacked onto advertisements and sales literature; all other GM divisions followed suit. In addition, GM quickly stopped associating engines with particular divisions and to this day, all GM engines are produced by "GM Powertrain" (GMPT) and are called GM "Corporate" engines instead of GM "Division" engines. Although it was the popularity of the Oldsmobile division vehicles that prompted this change, declining sales of V8 engines would have made this change inevitable as all but the Chevrolet version of the 350-cubic-inch engine were eventually discontinued.

Oldsmobile also introduced a 5.7L (350 cu-in) V8 diesel engine option on its Custom Cruiser, Delta 88 and 98 models in 1978; and a smaller 4.3L (260 cu-in) displacement V8 diesel on the 1979 Cutlass Salon and Cutlass Supreme/Cutlass Calais models. These were largely based on corresponding gasoline engines but with heavier duty cast blocks, redesigned heads and fast glow plugs; and on the 5.7L, oversized cranks, main bearings and wrist pins. There were several problems with these engines, including water and corrosion in the injectors (no water separator in the fuel line); paraffin clogging of fuel lines and filters in cold weather; reduced lubrication in the heads due to undersized oil galleys; head bolt failures; and the use of aluminum rockers and stanchions in the 4.3L V8 engines. While the 5.7L was also offered on various Buick, Cadillac, Chevrolet, GMC, and Pontiac models, it was eventually discontinued by all divisions in 1985. V6 diesels of 4.3L displacement were also offered between 1982 and 1985. In 1988 the then all-new 1988 Oldsmobile Cutlass Supreme Pace car was the first production car with heads up display.

Notable models:

- Oldsmobile Cutlass Supreme (1966–1997) – more performance and luxury than the lower-priced Cutlass and Cutlass S models, fitting in at the lower end of the personal luxury car market. Models were similar to the Pontiac Grand Prix, Chevrolet Monte Carlo, and Buick Regal.
- Oldsmobile 88 (1949–1999) – Oldsmobile full-sized family coupe and sedan. Led Oldsmobile sales from 1950 to 1974. Downsized in 1977, became front-wheel-drive in 1986. The first-generation 88 is reputed to have inspired the song "Rocket 88" – arguably the first rock & roll record.
- Oldsmobile 98 (1941–1996) – Oldsmobile full-sized luxury coupe and sedan that was downsized in 1977 and 1985, became front-wheel-drive in 1985.
- Oldsmobile Toronado (1966–1992) – personal luxury coupe, major redesign downsized the car in 1979 then again in 1986, Motor Trend Car of the Year in '66.
- Oldsmobile Omega (1973–1984) – European flavored compact car originally based on the Chevrolet Nova and later the Chevrolet Citation.
- Oldsmobile Calais (or Cutlass Calais) (1985–1991) – popular compact coupe and sedan on GM's "N-body" platform, similar to the Pontiac Grand Am. The series' name was taken from what was formerly the high-end option package for Cutlass Supreme models.
- Oldsmobile Cutlass Ciera (1982–1996) – popular selling upscale mid-sized car based on GM's A platform. During its run, the Cutlass Ciera was Oldsmobile's best-selling model. It consistently ranked among the highest-rated vehicles by J. D. Power and Associates; it was ranked the "Best in Price Class" on July 30, 1992, and the "Top-Ranked American-Made Car" on May 28, 1992. It was also named "Safe Car of the Year" by Prevention magazine on March 6, 1992.
- Oldsmobile Custom Cruiser (1971–1992) – full-size station wagon. Downsized in 1977. Within Oldsmobile, the Custom Cruiser shared its trim with either (or both) the Oldsmobile Delta 88 or Oldsmobile Ninety-Eight; following the further downsizing of Oldsmobile sedans in 1986, the Custom Cruiser effectively became a stand-alone model line. With the discontinuation of the Cutlass Supreme Classic in 1988, the Custom Cruiser became the sole Oldsmobile sold with rear-wheel drive.
- Oldsmobile Starfire (1975–1980) – sporty subcompact, hatchback coupe similar to the Chevrolet Monza, which was itself, based on the Chevrolet Vega.
- Oldsmobile Firenza (1982–1988) – compact sedan, hatchback, coupe, and station wagon based on GM's J-body, sharing the same platform with the Chevrolet Cavalier, Pontiac Sunbird, Buick Skyhawk, and Cadillac Cimarron.

=== 1990s ===
After the tremendous success of the 1970s and 1980s, things changed quickly for Oldsmobile, and by the early 1990s the brand had lost its place in the market (as annual sales had fallen from a record high of 1,066,122 in 1985 to just 402,936 in 1993), squeezed between other GM divisions, and with competition from new upscale import makes Acura, Infiniti and Lexus. GM continued to use Oldsmobile sporadically to showcase futuristic designs and as a "guinea pig" for testing new technology, with Oldsmobile offering the Toronado Trofeo, which included a visual instrument system with a calendar, datebook, climate controls and several prototypes built in conjunction with Avis with an early satellite-based navigation system. For 1995, Oldsmobile introduced the Aurora, which would be the inspiration for the design of its cars from the mid-1990s onward. The introduction of the Aurora marked as General Motors' catalyst to reposition Oldsmobile as an upscale import fighter. Accordingly, Oldsmobile received a new logo based on the familiar "rocket" theme. Also in 1995 Oldsmobile introduced the first satellite navigation system available in the United States, the Guidestar on the 1995 Oldsmobile 88. Nearly all the existing model names were gradually phased out: the Cutlass Calais in 1991, the Toronado and Custom Cruiser in 1992, the Ninety-Eight and Ciera (formerly Cutlass Ciera) in 1996, Cutlass Supreme in 1997, and finally the Eighty-Eight and Cutlass (which had only been around since '97) in 1999. They were replaced with newer, more modern models with designs inspired by the Aurora.

Redesigned and new models introduced from 1990 to 2004:

- Oldsmobile Achieva (1992–1998) – compact sedan & coupe
- Oldsmobile Alero (1999–2004) – compact sport sedan & coupe
- Oldsmobile Aurora (1995–2003) – full-size luxury/performance sedan (redesigned for 2001)
- Oldsmobile Bravada (1991–2004) – mid-size premium Sport utility vehicle (redesigned for 1996 and 2002)
- Oldsmobile Custom Cruiser (1971–1992) – full-size station wagon. (Redesigned for 1991)
- Oldsmobile Cutlass (1997–1999) – mid-size sedan
- Oldsmobile Eighty Eight (1949–1999) – full-size premium sedan (redesigned for 1992)
- Oldsmobile Intrigue (1998–2002) – mid-size luxury/sport sedan
- Oldsmobile Ninety-Eight (1941–1996) – full-size luxury sedan (redesigned for 1991)
- Oldsmobile Silhouette (1990–2004) – premium minivan (redesigned for 1997)

=== 2000s ===
In spite of Oldsmobile's critical successes since the mid-1990s, a reported shortfall in sales and overall profitability prompted General Motors to announce in December 2000 its plans to shut down the Oldsmobile organization. That announcement was officially revealed two days after Oldsmobile distributed the Bravada SUV – which became another critical hit for the division but turned out to be the final new model for the Oldsmobile brand.

The phaseout was conducted on the following schedule:

- February 2001: The 2002 Bravada, the company's last new model, hits Oldsmobile showrooms
- June 2002: Production ends for Intrigue and the Aurora V6 sedans
- March 2003: Aurora V8 sedan production ends
- January 2004: Bravada SUV production ends
- March 2004: Silhouette minivan production ends
- April 2004: Alero compact car production ends

The last 500 Aleros, Auroras, Bravadas, Silhouettes and Intrigues produced received special Oldsmobile heritage emblems and markings which signified 'Final 500'. All featured a unique Dark Cherry Metallic paint scheme. Auroras and Intrigues would be accompanied by special Final 500 literature. However, only the Intrigue, Aurora, Bravada, and Alero had all Final 500 models built; the Silhouette only had 360 built as a result of the plant running out of production capacity due to fleet order obligations for minivans on the same assembly line. The Oldsmobile division's last completed production car was an Alero GLS 4-door sedan, which was signed by all of the Olds assembly line workers. It was on display at the R. E. Olds Transportation Museum located in Lansing, Michigan, until GM's bankruptcy, when it retook possession of the car. It was then located at the GM Heritage Center in Sterling Heights, Michigan. In December 2017, the car headed to New York where it was auctioned off at a dealer-only auction for $42,000 to a Florida dealer. Also sold at the auction were a 1999 Cutlass and a 1996 Ciera.

== Firsts ==
During the 107 years of Oldsmobile's existence, it was known for being a guinea pig for new technologies and firsts.

- 1898 – Olds Motor Vehicle Company exports a steam powered automobile to Mumbai, India, making it the first exported American car.
- 1901 – The first speedometer to be offered on a production car was on an Oldsmobile Curved Dash.
- 1901 – Oldsmobile became the first car company to procure parts from third-party suppliers.
- 1901 – Olds produces 635 cars, becoming the first high-volume producer of gasoline automobiles.
- 1901 – Oldsmobile was the first auto manufacturer to publicly promote their vehicles.
- 1902 – The Oldsmobile Curved Dash becomes the first mass-produced vehicle in America.
- 1903 – Olds builds the first purpose built Mail Truck.
- 1908 – Oldsmobile becomes a division of GM, and rebadges the Buick Model B as the Oldsmobile Model 20, creating arguably the first badge-engineered automobile.
- 1915 – First standard windshield.
- 1926 – Oldsmobile was the first car company to use chrome plating on its trim.
- 1929 – Oldsmobile creates the first Monobloc V8 engine in its Viking Sister-brand.
- 1932 – Oldsmobile introduces the first automatic choke.
- 1935 – Oldsmobile offers the first all steel roof on an automobile.
- 1940 – Oldsmobile introduces the Hydra-Matic, the first production fully automatic transmission.
- 1948 – Oldsmobile, along with Buick and Cadillac begin offering one piece compound curved windshields. Prior to this, windshields were split in the middle.
- 1949 – Oldsmobile introduces the first high-compression, OHV V8 engine the Rocket.
- 1952 – Oldsmobile, introduces the "Autronic Eye" – the first automatic headlight dimming system.
- 1953 – Oldsmobile becomes one of the earliest automakers to switch their complete line up to the newly standardized 12v charging system. Buick Roadmasters and Cadillacs were other early adopters.
- 1962 – Oldsmobile creates first production turbocharged car, the Oldsmobile F-85 Jetfire.
- 1962 – Oldsmobile creates first production car with water injection, the Oldsmobile F-85 Jetfire.
- 1966 – The Toronado is the first mass-produced front-wheel-drive American car.
- 1969 – First use of chromed ABS plastic exterior trim, on the 1969 Oldsmobile Toronado.
- 1969 – First production electric grid window defogger on an American car, the 1969 Oldsmobile Toronado.
- 1971 – The Oldsmobile Toronado was arguably the first production car with a high mounted brake light. The taillights were supplemented by a pair of eye-level stop and signal lamps set in slots just below the rear window.
- 1974 – The Toronado is the first American car to offer a driver-side airbag, a feature later shared with Buick and Cadillac.
- 1977 – The Toronado is the first production American car with a microprocessor to run engine controls.
- 1982 – First use of high-impact moulded plastic body components – 1982 Oldsmobile Omega
- 1986 – Oldsmobile along with Buick introduces the Delco VIC touchscreen interface on the Oldsmobile Toronado and the Buick Riviera first of its kind on a production Automobile.
- 1988 – The first production heads-up display system – 1988 Oldsmobile Cutlass Supreme Indy Pace car.
- 1988 – Oldsmobile broke a world closed-course speed record with the Oldsmobile Aerotech at 267 miles per hour (430 km/h), driven by legendary race car driver A. J. Foyt.
- 1990 – Oldsmobile introduces an updated color Touchscreen interface with built in cellular phone (a predecessor to modern infotainment systems) on the 1990 Oldsmobile Toronado Trofeo.
- 1995 – Oldsmobile presented Guidestar, the first on-board navigation system to be offered on a US production car.
- 1997 – Oldsmobile is the first American car company to turn 100.
- 2001 – The fully redesigned 2002 Oldsmobile Bravada SUV became the first truck ever to pace the Indianapolis 500.

== Leadership ==
- Ransom E. Olds (1897–1915)
- Richard H. Scott (1915–1933)
- Charles McCuen (1933–1940)
- Sherrod Skinner (1940–1950)
- Jack Wolfram (1951–1964)
- Harold N. Metzel (1964–1969)
- John Beltz (1969–1972)
- Howard Kehrl (1972–1983)
- Joseph Sanchez (1983–1985)
- Willam Lane (1986–1989)
- Mike Losh (1989–1992)
- John Rock (1992–1996)
- Darwin Clark (1997–1999)
- Karen Francis (1999–2000)

== Oldsmobile Administration Building ==
The 200,000 square-foot Oldsmobile Administration Building, also known as Building 70, was completed in 1966 to accommodate the company's major administration departments. Located at 920 Townsend Avenue, at what is currently the GM Lansing Grand River Assembly plant, the project was constructed by Michigan contractor Utley-James, with architectural design contracted by GMAC.

The headquarters accommodated about 900 employees in a Modern design with exterior marble and curtain walls reminiscent of the General Motors Technical Center. Approach walkways integrated snow melting units, and the design incorporated interior and exterior artwork. The building has two prominent interconnected towers in the northeast corner: a six-level north wing and a four-level south wing. The building's two-story lobby featured a sunken visitor waiting area, a place to display a current Oldsmobile, and a reception area, 'floating' within a water pool.

Oldsmobile commissioned two prominent sculptures by noted sculptor Samuel Cashwan, who had previously served on the General Motors Styling Staff. The exterior Cashwan sculpture, titled Open Cage, previously located outside the Admin Building's primary entrance, was donated in 2006, to be placed at the entrance to the R.E. Olds Transportation Museum. The east wall of the penthouse featured the brand's name, spaced out letter by letter – signage which was removed in 2006 and subsequently also gifted to the Lansing R.E. Olds Transportation Museum. By 1996, the company's remaining employees relocated to Detroit's Renaissance Center.

Today, the Oldsmobile Administration Building continues to sit abandoned, and the entire property is fenced off. The towers have been used as a makeshift billboard, initially to promote the Cadillac ATS, and currently promotes the now-discontinued Cadillac CTS.

== Production ==
Model Year(s)	Model	H.P. Rating	Cyl.	Remarks
1901–1903	Curved Dash Model R	5	1	
1902	Pirate	7	1	Racer
1904	Curved Dash Model 6C	7	1	
1904	Model T	10	1	a.k.a. "Light Tonneau"
1904–1905	Model N	7	1	a.k.a. "Touring Runabout"
1905–1906	Curved Dash Model B	7	1	
1905	Side Entrance Tonneau	20	2	5-passenger
1905	Coach	16	2	11-passenger
1905	Delivery	10	1	Delivery
1905-1906	Heavy Delivery	16	2	Delivery
1906	Model L	20/24	2, opposed	
1906	Model S	26/28	4	
1906	Wagonette	16	2	18-passenger
1907	Curved Dash Model F	7	1	
1907	Model H	35-40	4	
1907	Model A	35-40	4	
1908	Model M / MR	36	4	
1908–1909	Model X	32	4	
1908–1909	Model Z	40	6	
1909	20	22	4	Derived from Buick 10
1909	Model D / DR		4	
1910	Special	40	4	Replaces all previous 4-cylinder cars
1910–1912	Limited	60	6	Introduced 1909 as 1910 model
1911	Special	36	4	Compressed-air starter (all)
1911-12	Autokrat	40	4	
1912–1913	Defender	35	4	el. Starter & lighting (all)
1913	53	50	6	Replaces Limited and Autocrat
1914–1915	42	20	4	"Baby-Olds"
1914	54	50	6	"6th Generation Six"
1915-16	43	30	6	"4th Generation Four"
1915	55	50	6	"6th Generation Six"
1916	44 "Light Eight"		V-8	
1917	45 "Light Eight"		V-8	
1918	45A "Light Eight"		V-8	

=== Models ===
- Oldsmobile Six (Series F)
- Oldsmobile Eight (Series L)
- Oldsmobile Deluxe
- Oldsmobile 66 and 68 (1939–1948)
- Oldsmobile 76 and 78 (1946–1950)
- Oldsmobile 98 (1941–1996)
- Oldsmobile 88 (1949–1999)
- Oldsmobile F-85 (1961–1967)
- Oldsmobile Starfire (1961–1966 & 1975–1980)
- Oldsmobile Jetstar I (1964–1965)
- Oldsmobile Vista Cruiser (1964–1977)
- Oldsmobile Cutlass (1964–1977, 1980–1981 & 1997–1999)
- Oldsmobile Toronado (1966–1992)
- Oldsmobile Cutlass Supreme (1967–1997)
- Oldsmobile 442 (1968–1980 & 1985–1987)
- Oldsmobile Custom Cruiser (1971–1992)
- Oldsmobile Omega (1973–1984)
- Oldsmobile Cutlass Salon (1973–1980 & 1985–1987)
- Oldsmobile Cutlass Cruiser (1978–1996)
- Oldsmobile Firenza (1982–1988)
- Oldsmobile Cutlass Ciera (1982–1996)
- Oldsmobile Cutlass Calais (1985–1991)
- Oldsmobile Touring Sedan (1987–1990)
- Oldsmobile Silhouette (1990–2004)
- Oldsmobile Bravada (1991–2004)
- Oldsmobile Achieva (1992–1998)
- Oldsmobile Aurora (1995–2003)
- Oldsmobile Intrigue (1998–2002)
- Oldsmobile Alero (1999–2004)

=== Concept ===
- Oldsmobile Starfire (1953)
- Oldsmobile Cutlass (1954)
- Oldsmobile F-88 (1954)
- Oldsmobile 88 Delta (1955)
- Oldsmobile Golden Rocket (1956)
- Oldsmobile F-88 Mark II (1957)
- Oldsmobile F-88 Mark III (1959)
- Oldsmobile X-215 (1962)
- Oldsmobile El Torero (1963)
- Oldsmobile J-TR (1963)
- Oldsmobile Thor by Ghia (1967)
- Oldsmobile Incas by ItalDesign (1986)
- Oldsmobile Aerotech (1987)
- Oldsmobile Aerotech III (1989)
- Oldsmobile Tube Car (1989)
- Oldsmobile Expression (1990)
- Oldsmobile Achieva (1991)
- Oldsmobile Anthem (1992)
- Oldsmobile Antares (1995)
- Oldsmobile Alero Alpha (1997)
- Oldsmobile Recon (1999)
- Oldsmobile Profile (2000)
- Oldsmobile O4 (2001)

== Export markets ==
=== Canada ===
In Canada, the range was limited, with the Oldsmobile Silhouette and Oldsmobile Bravada being unavailable to Canadian consumers until much later in their production life.

- The Oldsmobile Cutlass (1997–1999 version) was not offered there.
- The Oldsmobile Silhouette was sold in Canada from 1998 onwards, unlike in the United States.
- The Oldsmobile Bravada was unavailable in Canada until its third generation in 2002; previous models sold in Canada were grey import vehicles.

=== Mexico ===
In Mexico, all Oldsmobile models were sold under the Chevrolet brand.

=== Europe ===
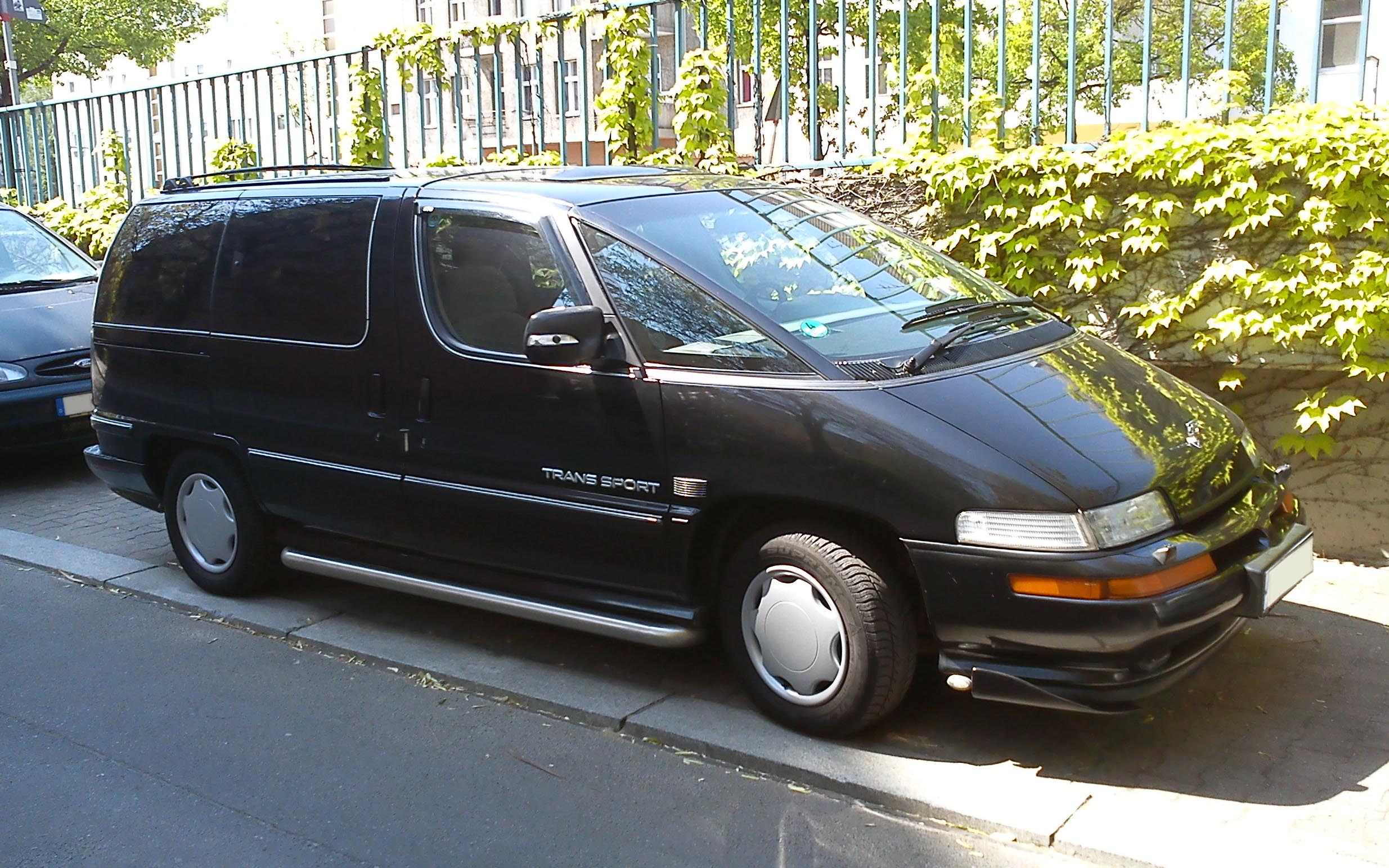
Pontiac Trans Sport

For the European market, the Oldsmobile Silhouette was sold between 1994 and 1997 as the Pontiac Trans Sport by replacing the Oldsmobile badging with Pontiac badging, along with Pontiac wheels. Sales in Europe were good for an American import, but did not represent enough volume to make a distinct model economically feasible for the European market. Its successors were both the Chevrolet Trans Sport (second generation Pontiac Trans Sport rebadged as a Chevrolet) (LWB), and the Opel/Vauxhall Sintra (SWB).

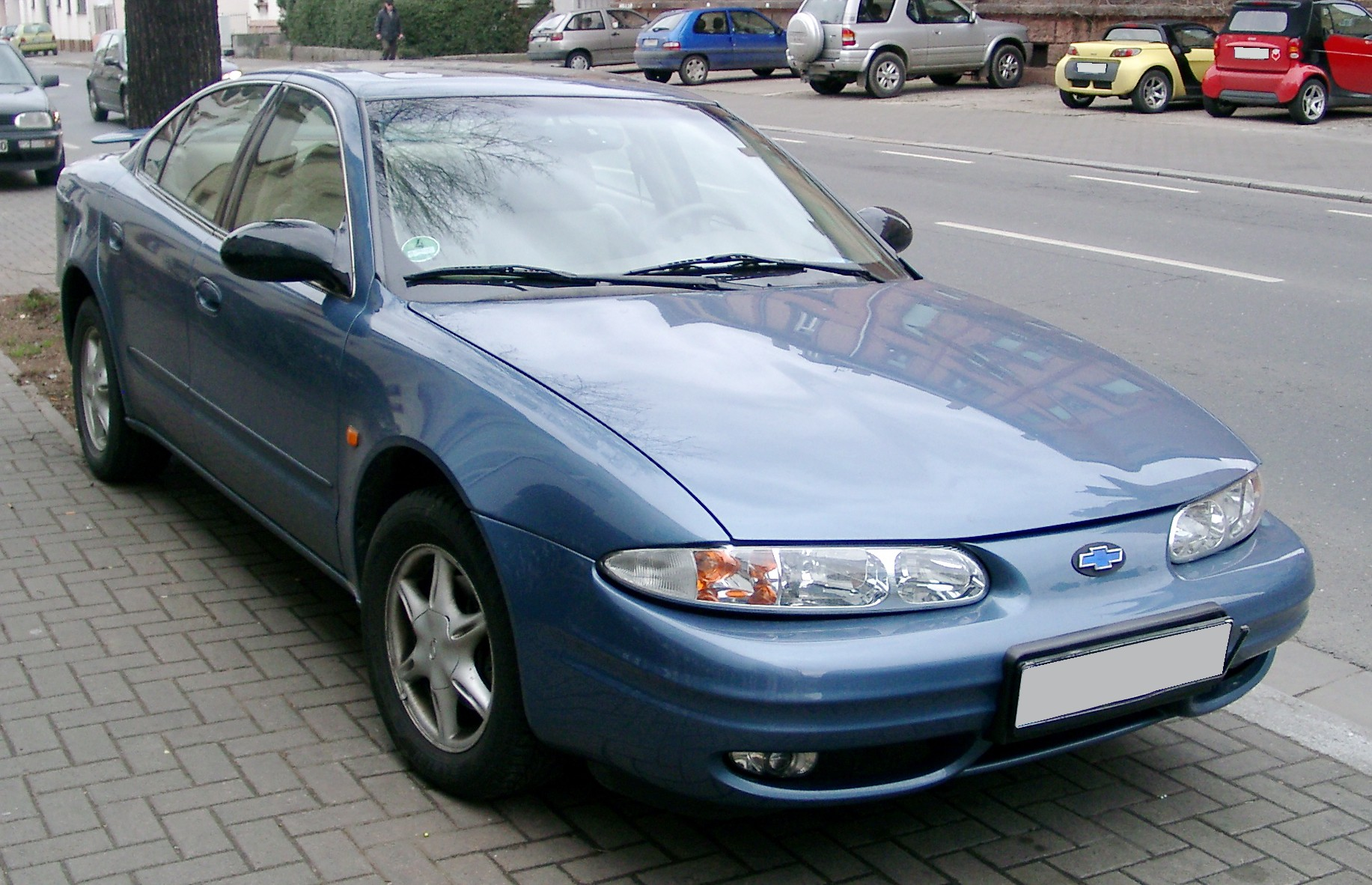
Chevrolet Alero

The Oldsmobile Alero was sold in select countries in Europe (and Israel) between 1999 and 2001 as the Chevrolet Alero, and was only available as a 4-door sedan. The car still featured its Oldsmobile badges even though sold under the Chevrolet brand, but since most European consumers would not recognize the badging, Chevrolet badges were added to the grille and rear fascia for the 2000 model year. The Alero featured Chevrolet emblems throughout its entire run in Israel. The Alero was replaced in Europe and Israel by the GM Daewoo-sourced Chevrolet Evanda/Epica.

== Marketing themes ==
Early on in its history, Olds enjoyed a public relations boost from the 1905 hit song In My Merry Oldsmobile. The same theme – a fast, powerful Olds car helping the driver romance the opposite sex – was updated in the 1950s with the iconic hit Rocket 88.

The strong public relations efforts by GM in the 1950s was epitomized in the Motorama, a "one company" auto show extravaganza. Millions of Americans attended, in a spirit not unlike a "mini-World's Fair". Every GM division had a "Dream Car". Oldsmobile's dream/concept car was called "The Golden Rocket".

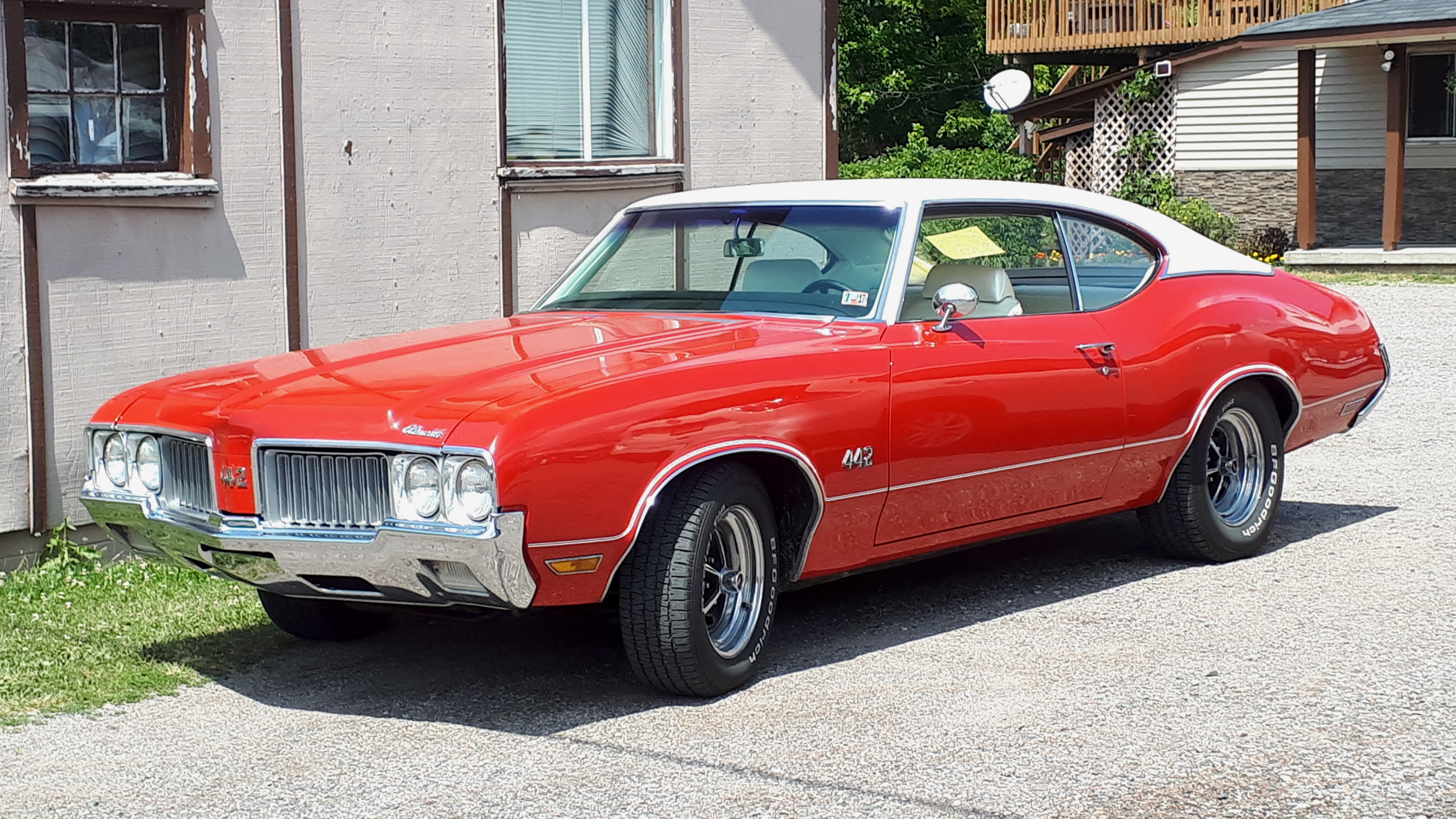
1970 Oldsmobile 442

The Dr. Oldsmobile theme was one of Oldsmobile's most successful marketing campaigns in the early '70s, it involved fictional characters created to promote the popular 442 muscle car. 'Dr. Oldsmobile' was a tall lean professor type who wore a white lab coat. His assistants included 'Elephant Engine Ernie' who represented the big block 455 Rocket engine. 'Shifty Sidney' was a character who could be seen swiftly shifting his hand using a Hurst shifter. 'Wind Tunnel Waldo' had slicked back hair that appeared to be constantly wind blown. He represented Oldsmobile's wind tunnel testing. Another character included 'Hy Spy' who had his ear to the ground as he checked out the competition.

A public relations campaign in the late 1980s proclaimed that this was "not your father's Oldsmobile." The company produced a series of television ads during this time; said ads featured the offspring of various celebrities, and sometimes the celebrity in question. These ads included:

- Frankie Avalon Jr.
- David and Gina Belafonte, son and daughter of Harry Belafonte
- Cary Bettenhausen, son of race driver Gary Bettenhausen
- Noel Blanc, son of Mel Blanc
- Jay Carpenter, son of astronaut Scott Carpenter
- Amanda Graves, daughter of Peter Graves
- Richard Hall, son of Monty Hall
- Wynonna Judd
- Deborah Moore, daughter of Roger Moore
- Julie Nimoy, daughter of Leonard Nimoy
- Lisa Marie Presley, daughter of Elvis Presley
- Abigail Rockwell, granddaughter of Norman Rockwell
- Jodi Serling, daughter of Rod Serling
- Melanie Shatner, daughter of William Shatner
- Lee Starr, daughter of Ringo Starr

Ironically, some fans of the brand say that the declining sales were in fact caused by "The New Generation of Oldsmobile" campaign, as the largest market for Oldsmobiles was the population whose parents had, in fact, owned Oldsmobiles and that by going away from the traditional vehicles that Oldsmobile's brand was built upon, lost many loyal buyers and put the brand on a collision course with Pontiac and Buick, which led to internal cannibalization and a downfall from which it could never recover. Oldsmobile's final major ad campaign had the slogan "Start Something" in a last-ditch effort to market to younger buyers at the turn of the millennium.

== Corporate Logo ==
=== Logo evolution ===
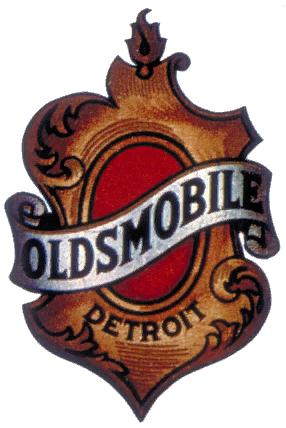
1897

1919

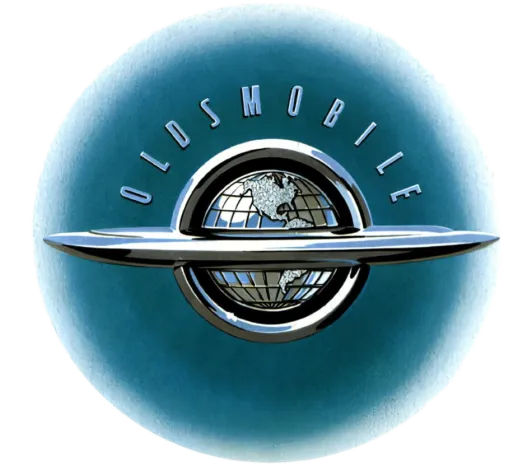
1940

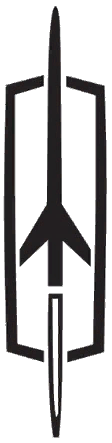
1960

1981

=== Advertisements ===
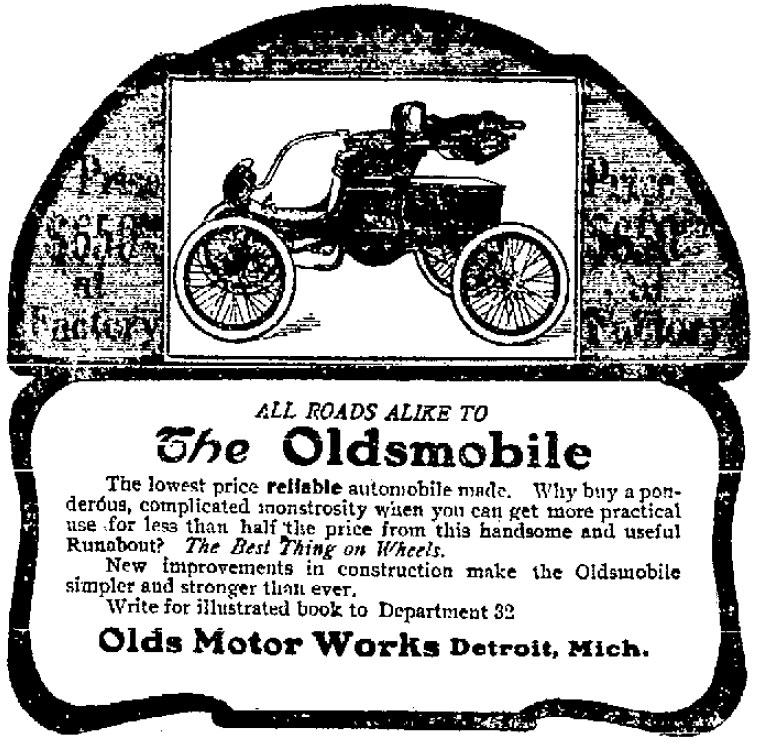
Galveston Daily News, December 28, 1902

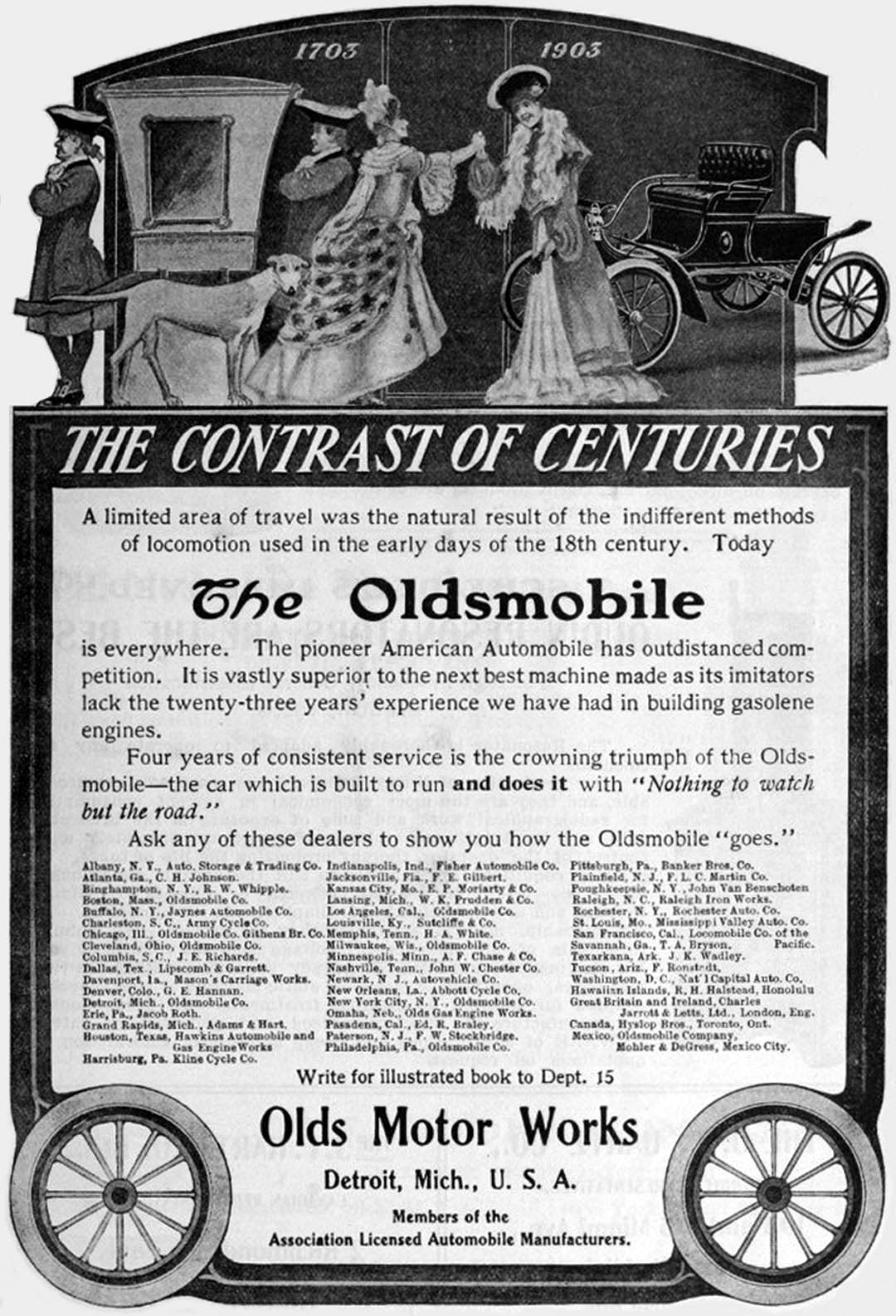
Detroit Medical Journal, 1903

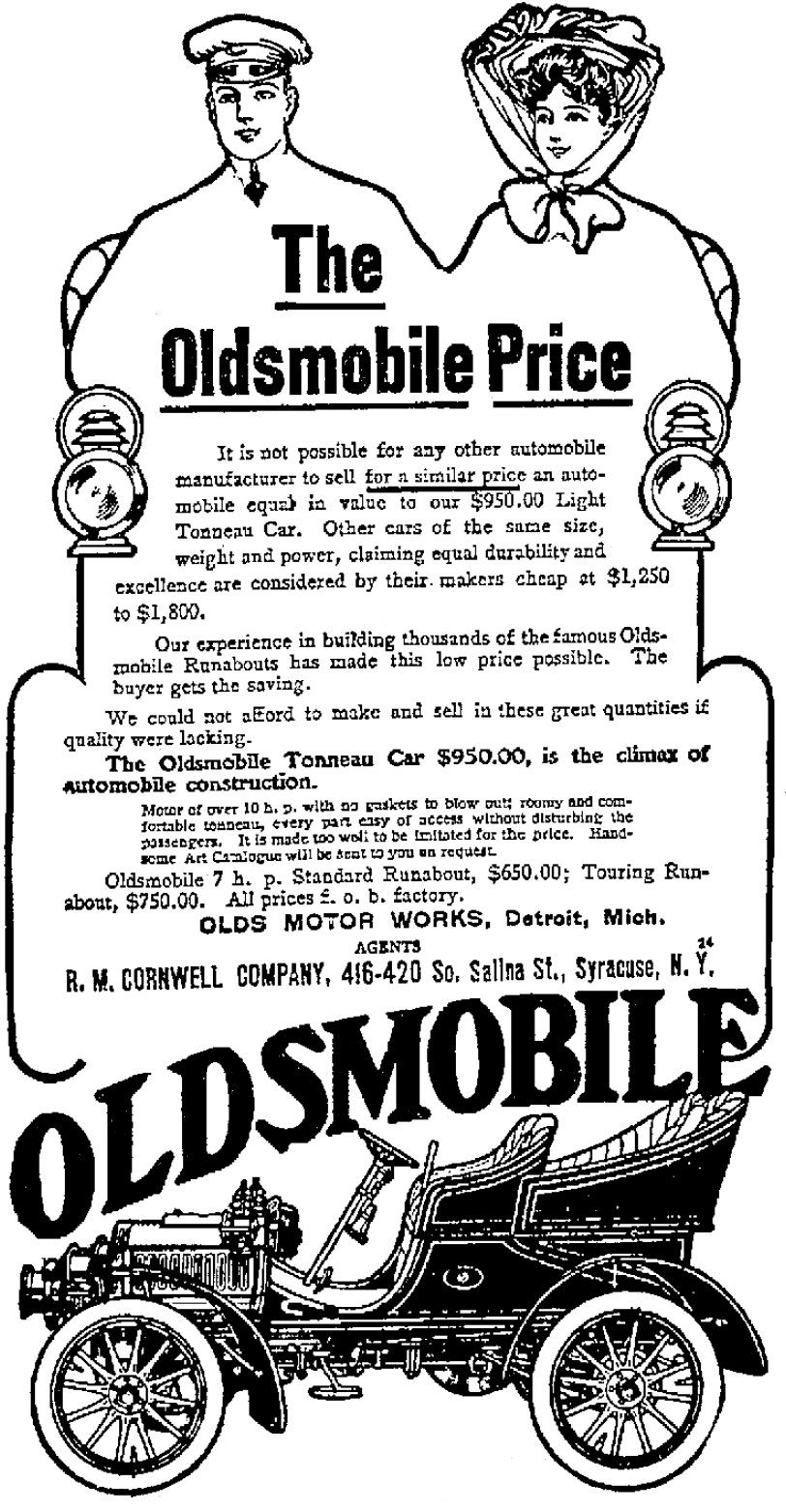
Syracuse Post-Standard, September 30, 1904

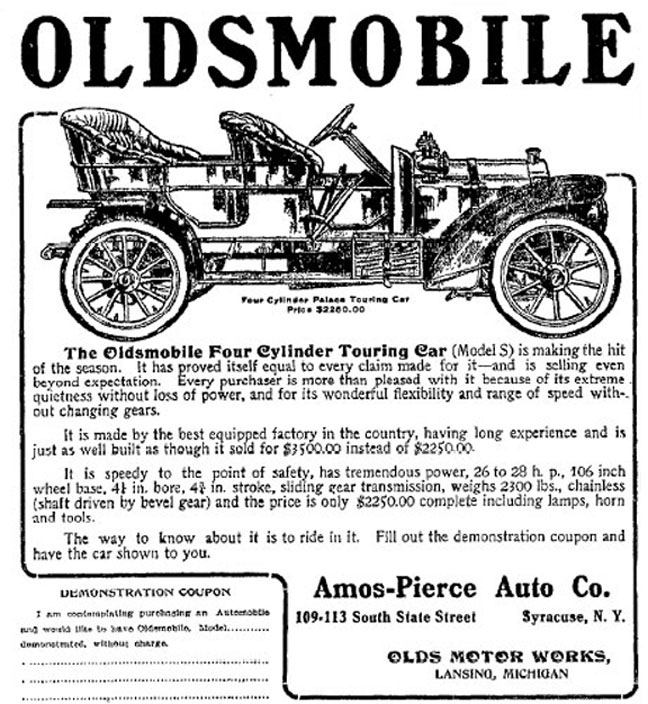
Syracuse Herald, April 7, 1906

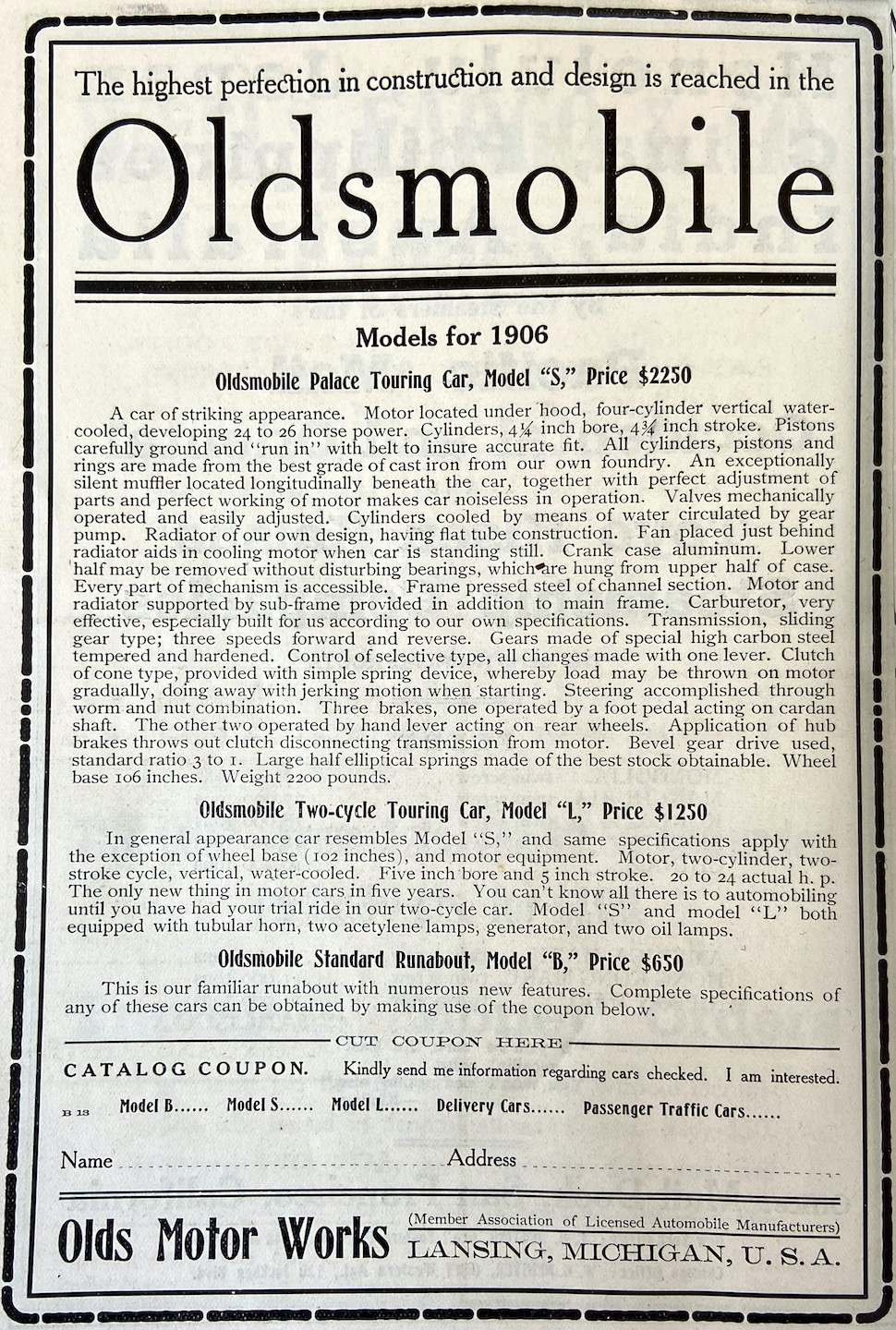
Sunset, June–July 1906

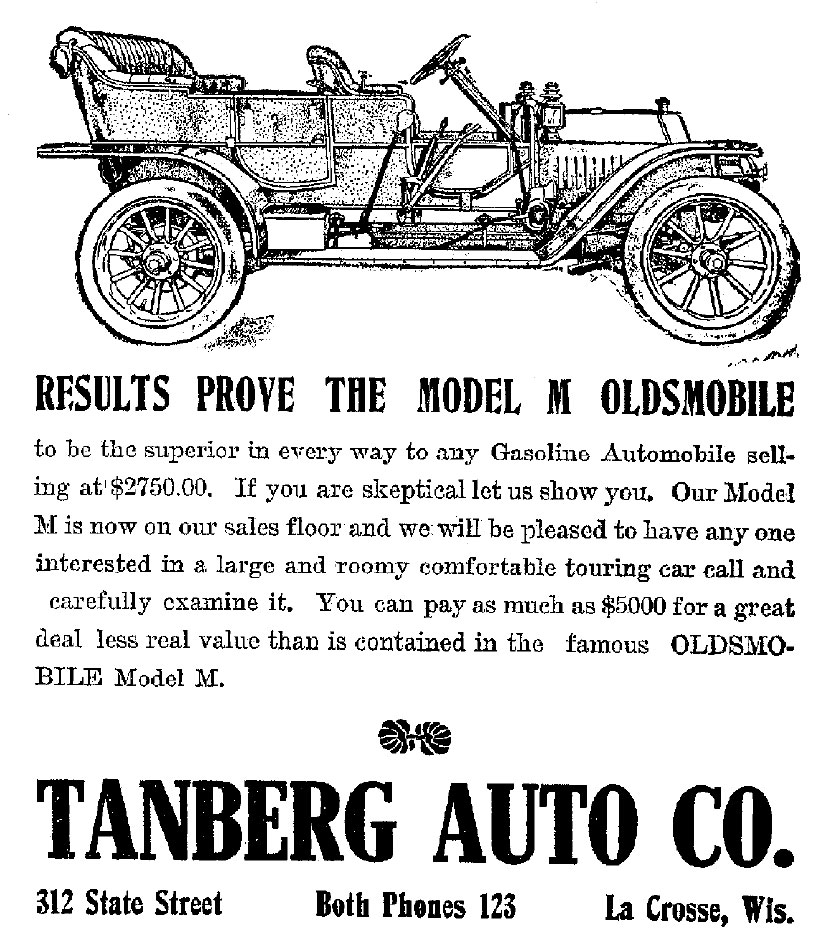
La Crosse Tribune, May 8, 1908

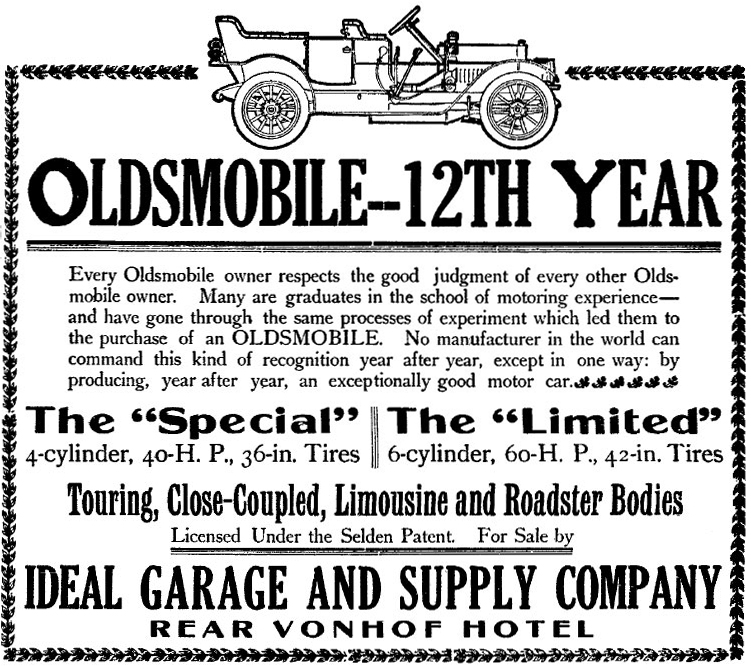
Mansfield News, April 23, 1910

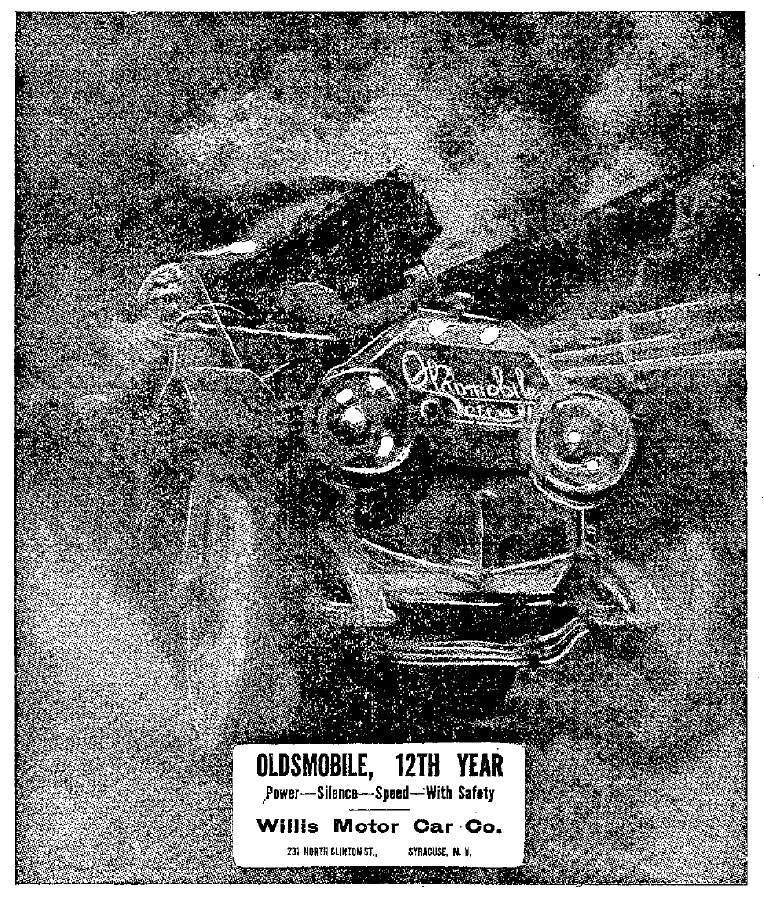
Syracuse Post-Standard, June 11, 1910

== Motorsport ==
=== NASCAR ===
Oldsmobile is especially known for its competition in NASCAR. Beginning with the Rocket 88, Oldsmobile proved heavily competitive in stock car racing. In the Sixties, the Rocket 88 was replaced by the 442. Eventually, the Cutlass would lead Oldsmobile into the Eighties before GM reduced its entries to Chevrolet and Pontiac in the Nineties. It was the restyled body of the Cutlass Supreme that (along with the Chevrolet Monte Carlo, Buick Regal, and Pontiac Grand Prix) ushered in the downsized cars into NASCAR cup competition. While the Cutlass looked almost identical to the Buick Regal (which scored 35+ victories in the 1981 thru 1985 seasons), the Cutlass (like the Dodge Mirada) didn't take one checkered flag, and many teams moved away from it in 1983 to the Regal, Grand Prix, and restyled Monte Carlo SS. This was a rude awakening to Oldsmobile, which was getting used to wins on the NASCAR circuit. The body style of the 1988 to 1992 Cutlass proved to be a winner for NASCAR competition and it visited the victory circle 13 times between 1989 and 1992, when Oldsmobile ended its racing program.

=== IMSA GT ===
In the IMSA GT Championship, Oldsmobile would provide power for IMSA GT Prototypes alongside Chevrolet and Buick. The Cutlass was used in IMSA GTO along with other vehicles also being used in Trans Am and NASCAR. The Aurora bodystyle was utilised in the IMSA WSC era series in the mid 1990's in the GTS-1 class to develop the Northstar V8 engine which was later used in IRL racing.

=== IndyCar ===
Oldsmobile was an engine supplier in the IndyCar Series along with Infiniti between 1997 and 2001, when General Motors switched the brand used in the then-Indy Racing League to Chevrolet.

=== Trans Am Series ===
The Cutlass was used in the Trans Am Series during the 1980s. Many vehicles also being used in NASCAR at the time were used in Trans Am and IMSA GTO.

== See also ==
- List of automobile manufacturers
- List of defunct automobile manufacturers of the United States
- Oldsmobile Diesel engine
- Oldsmobile Quad 4 engine
- Oldsmobile straight-6 engine
- Oldsmobile V8 engine
