= John Beltz =

American automobile executive

John Beltz (1926–1972) was Oldsmobile's chief engineer in 1964 and one of the prime movers of the Oldsmobile Toronado and 442 project. Beltz was promoted to Oldsmobile general manager at age 43 in 1969 when Harold N. Metzel retired. Beltz died in May 1972 from cancer at the age of 46. He was revered in the automotive industry as a visionary ahead of his time. Throughout his career, Beltz became known as much for his engineering brilliance as his charisma, his always clever sense of humor and impeccable taste in cars. According to legend, John Beltz and his staff led Oldsmobile through undoubtedly its best years and the Oldsmobiles from 1949 to 72 define Olds as the Rocket division of GM. It is said that during his time at the helm of Oldsmobile, Beltz represented Michigan and the auto industry in its purest form, when cars were king and the auto industry worker, both blue and white-collar, was the lifeblood of the state.

Beltz was featured in the July 1969 issue of Hot Rod magazine posing with some experimental Olds versions that never saw production.

The Car Connection notes that Beltz's best friend and Olds PR man Fritz Bennets recalls that Beltz "was a favorite of the press. Bennets recalls a press conference in the Sixties when an overly eager reporter failed to ask a question but delivered a lengthy opinion. To the delight of other writers, Beltz interrupted and said, 'if you want to make a speech, hire a hall.' Bennets felt that Beltz reacted too strongly and asked him to meet with the writer. He concurred and met with his critic over lunch.

== Car & Driver Cover ==
Beltz was also featured on the February 1971 cover of Car and Driver magazine (his most legendary editorial appearance), shown in the Sonoran desert at the GM Proving Grounds near Phoenix, leaning against a Toronado with his sunglasses on. In the corresponding article within the issue, the writer dubbed Beltz the ultimate "real car man" and Beltz discussed the Toronado and briefly, his other favorite Olds model, the high-performance 442. When asked why he built the Toronado, Beltz, in typical fashion, simply responded "It just makes you feel like God."

Other notable Beltz quotes from Gordon Jennings' piece include:

Discussing his love for automotive engineering: "I just fell in love with that machinery. I still love it. Love to see it change from lines on paper to finished form. All the time I was Chief Engineer, I couldn't wait to get my hands on the first prototype of a new car. I'd look for excuses to go out there in the shops and look at cars. I still do."

"But there's a lot more to the Toronado buyer than education and income: He's a guy who has made it - and knows that he has. Basically he's not buying a car to prove anything, because he has already proven it."

Writer Gordon Jennings wrote of Beltz, "Listening to John Beltz, which was what we mostly did, because he will talk at length on the subject of Toronados with little prompting - and very lucid speech it is - we found ourselves becoming almost too favorably predisposed to like the new Toronado. In fact, a few hours with John Beltz will make anyone ready to go out and buy an Oldsmobile."

== Setting the Pace ==
Beltz was also discussed at length in the coffee table tome "Setting the Pace: Oldsmobiles First 100 Years" in which co-workers and friends at Olds spoke about John Beltz the man, as well as his influence on the industry during an era of "new frontiers."

Bill Murphy, who was assistant controller at Olds in the '60s described Beltz as "absolutely brilliant. He had a real sense of humor though a lot of it was biting. John had no time for people who weren't interested in their job, or working hard, keeping up to date. He had no patience for that. You had to know what the answer was or you wouldn't give it. John had a wonderful vocabulary, a great fund of stories and sparkling wit, but he was tough and didn't hesitate to call a spade a spade."

The book discusses Beltz's transition to GM of Oldsmobile in 1969, saying, "If Beltz had been well liked before, he was even more popular now - even among the press, who loved his candor and colorful language." Beltz became well known for his ability to win the hearts and minds of the press and the people.

Hurst Olds engineer Jack "Doc" Watson also discussed Beltz's likable personality, explaining, "It was so funny. Anyone who knew John Beltz knew that whatever was on his mind came right out of his mouth. One time he said, 'Doc, you're a nice young man, but I just have to tell you that we know you're buddies with [Pontiac General Manager John] DeLorean, so he's going to get all your good stuff."

Oldsmobile's Bob Somers recalled a meeting he attended with Beltz at the GM building in downtown Detroit, introducing the XP-90, otherwise known as the "all-plastic" car. After Beltz and Somers' presentation, the board turned the proposed project down, and Somers said, "Roche's [James M., chairman of the GM board at the time] man gets up and he's got a flimsy overhead transparency. It's got figures I can't even read - little tiny numbers... the guy gets up there and goes whish, right through it. He gets all done and nobody knows what he said. Roche says, 'And that's why we're not going to do it.' And John says, 'Jesus Christ, not only can I not read it, I didn't understand it.' Right in front of the chairman of the board... So that was John Beltz."

The book also discusses Beltz's death in 1972, and the devastation within the Oldsmobile family over losing one of their most beloved bosses. Product delivery manager at the time of Beltz's death, Bob Richards said, "the number-one general manager. He to me was THE general manager. He was just a take-charge, take-over sort of guy. Once he said this is it, everyone knew he meant it."

Assistant Motor Engineer at the time, Tom Leonard also discussed Beltz at the time of his death, saying "John was a super guy. He was probably the most people-oriented person I ever knew. We knew something was wrong, but nobody knew it was cancer. He kept things to himself until the end."

Assembly Plant Superintendent Ken Ricks recalled a meeting with Beltz "Just a couple of weeks before he quit working. I got a call to come up to his office... I went in and saw him sitting behind that desk. He was saffron yellow, looking terrible. He said, 'I tried to get down to the plant to see you three or four times and I just couldn't make it. My only purpose in asking you up here is to tell you how much I appreciate your work.' And you know, that gets a guy right where it hurts. I would have rather had that than a $5000 a month raise. That's the kind of man he was."

== Family ==
Beltz was survived by two daughters, Johnna and Anna, and wife Loentine. Beltz's eldest daughter, Johnna Beltz-Snyder, succumbed to pancreatic cancer in 2007. Johnna is survived by two children, daughter Elizabeth and younger son John. John Snyder is now heavily immersed in the auto industry as a writer for Winding Road magazine. Beltz's daughter Anna is married to Mike Miller (mentored by Beltz in his formative years) who went on to race for Jack Roush in the SCCA professional Trans-Am series, top alcohol dragsters and open wheel cars in the Formula Atlantic series. He formed the manufacturing company Stealth Technologies & Engineering in 1989 which is now Orchid Orthopedic Solutions LLC. Mike and Anna Miller have three grown daughters, from eldest to youngest, Laurna, Emilia (Emmy) and Maryalexandra (Maryal).
