= Oldsmobile Toronado =

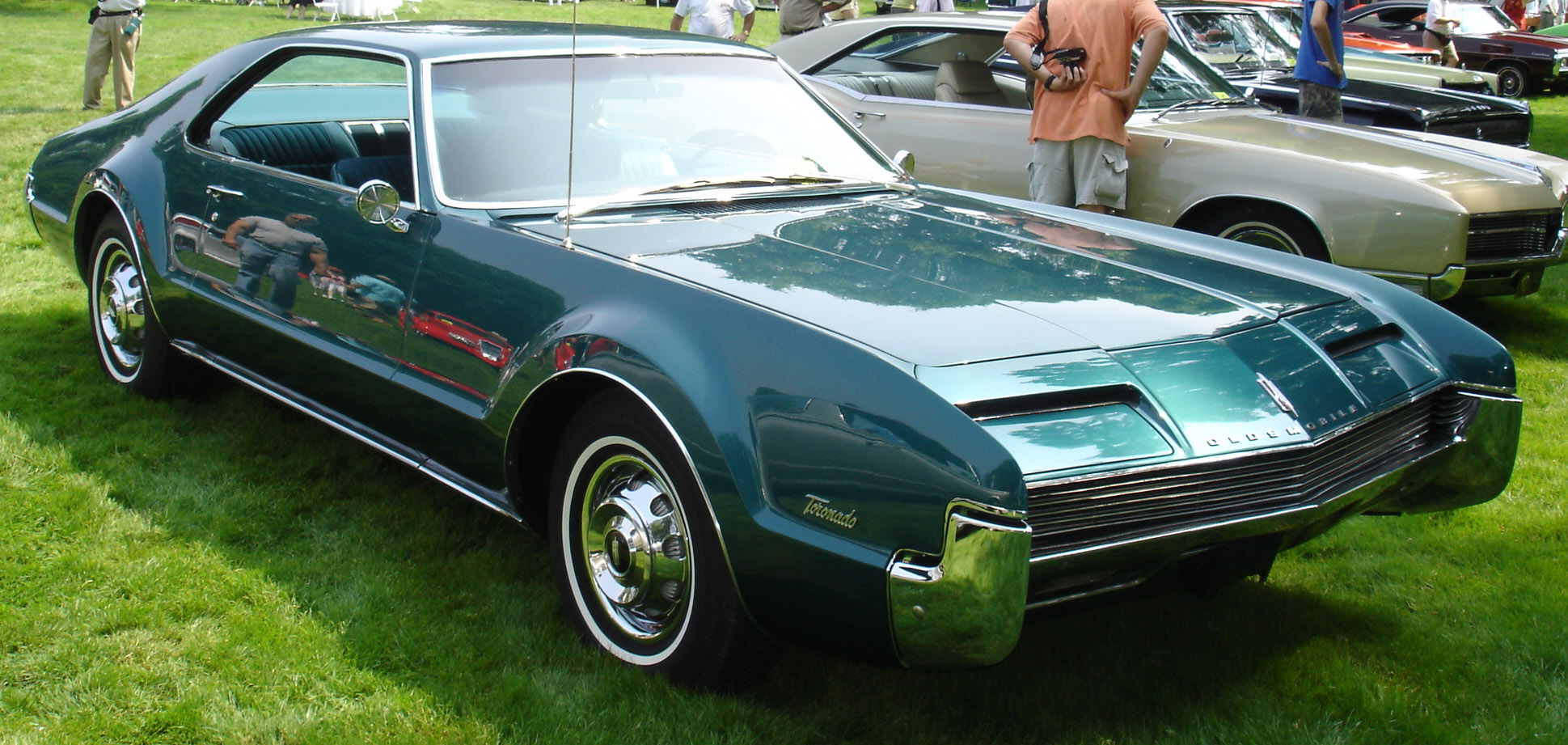
- 1966 Toronado

Overview
- Manufacturer: Oldsmobile (General Motors)
- Production: 1965–1992
- Model years: 1966–1992

Body and chassis
- Class: Full-size personal luxury car
- Body style: 2-door coupe
- Layout: FF layout
- Platform: E-body
- Related: Cadillac Eldorado; Buick Riviera

The Oldsmobile Toronado is a personal luxury car manufactured and marketed by the Oldsmobile division of General Motors from 1966 to 1992 over four generations. The Toronado was noted for its transaxle version of GM's Turbo-Hydramatic transmission, making it the first U.S.-produced front-wheel drive automobile since the demise of the Cord 810/812 in 1937.

The Toronado used the GM E platform introduced by the rear-wheel drive Buick Riviera in 1963 and adopted for the front-wheel drive 1967 Cadillac Eldorado. The three models shared the E platform for most of the Toronado's 26-year history.

== Etymology ==
The name "Toronado" had no prior meaning and was originally selected for a 1963 Chevrolet show car.

== First generation (1966–1970) ==
First generation
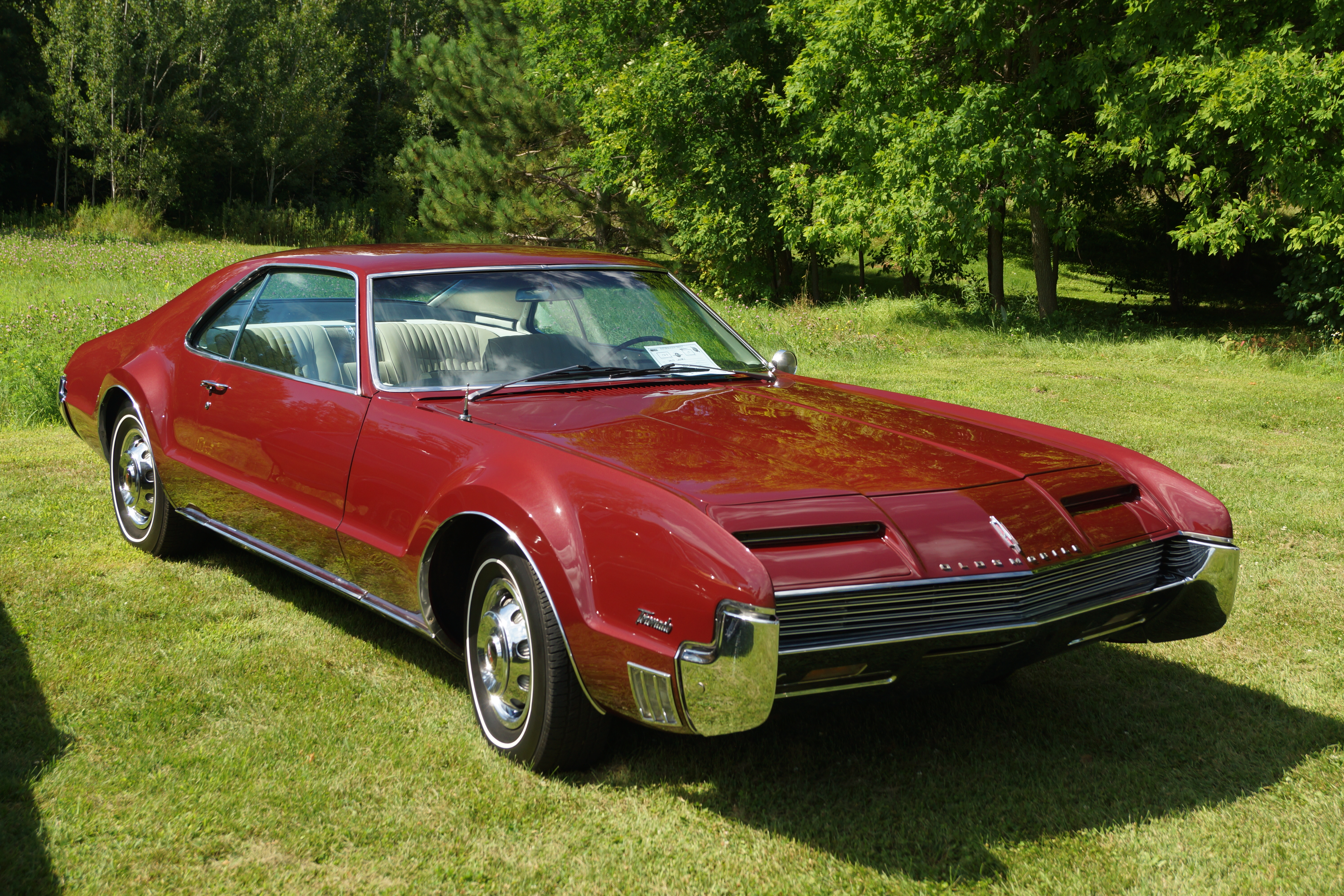
- 1966 Oldsmobile Toronado

Overview
- Production: 1965–1970
- Model years: 1966–1970
- Assembly: United States: Lansing, Michigan (Lansing Car Assembly)
- Designer: David North, Bill Mitchell

Body and chassis
- Layout: FF layout

Powertrain
- Engine: 425 cu in (7.0 L) 385 hp (287 kW) Rocket V8; 455 cu in (7.5 L) Rocket V8
- Transmission: 3-speed TH-425 automatic

Dimensions
- Wheelbase: 119.0 in (3,023 mm)
- Length: 211 in (5,359 mm) (1966–67); 211.6 in (5,375 mm) (1968); 214.8 in (5,456 mm) (1969–1970)
- Width: 78.5 in (1,994 mm)
- Height: 52.8 in (1,341 mm)
- Curb weight: 4,496 lb (2,039 kg)

The Toronado began as a design painting by Oldsmobile stylist David North in 1962. His "Flame Red Car" was a compact sports/personal car never intended for production. A few weeks after the design was finished, however, Oldsmobile division was informed it would be permitted to build a personal car in the Riviera/Thunderbird class for the 1966 model year, and North's design was selected. For production economy, the still-unnamed car was to share the so-called E-body shell with the redesigned 1966 Buick Riviera (then entering its second generation), which was substantially larger than North had envisioned. Despite the efforts of Oldsmobile and General Motors styling chief Bill Mitchell to put the car on the smaller A-body intermediate used by the Oldsmobile Cutlass, they were overruled for cost reasons.

Oldsmobile had been working on front-wheel drive since 1958, a project shepherded by engineer John Beltz (who originated the 4-4-2 and would later become head of the division). Although initially envisioned for the smaller F-85 line, its cost and experimental nature pushed the program towards a larger, more expensive car. Engineer F. J. Hooven of the Ford Motor Company, had patented a similar FWD layout, and Ford considered the design for the 1961 Ford Thunderbird. However, the capability to develop and engineer it on such short notice was doubtful. In 1956 Oldsmobile had also introduced a personal 2-door concept car called the Oldsmobile Golden Rocket that did not progress to production.

The unusual Toronado powertrain developed by Oldsmobile, called the Unitized Power Package (UPP), packaged a Rocket V8 and transmission into an engine bay no larger than one for a conventional rear-wheel drive car. During its seven-year development, UPP components were driven over 1.5 million test miles to verify their strength and reliability. They proved so well-built the UPP was employed basically unchanged in the 1970s GMC motorhome.

Firestone designed an 8.85" x 15" tire especially for the Toronado called the TFD (Toronado-Front-Drive) tire. It had a stiffer sidewall than normal, and the tread and stylishly thin white pin-stripe were also unique.

Oldsmobile engineers selected a conventional, though performance-boosted, Oldsmobile 425 cu in (7 L) Super Rocket V8 rated at 385 hp (287 kW) and 475 lb⋅ft (644 N⋅m) of torque. It was an increase of 10 hp (7.5 kW) over the Starfire 425, and an increase of 20 hp (15 kW) over the standard 425 engine in the Oldsmobile Ninety-Eight. The Toronado intake manifold's unique shape was depressed to allow for engine hood clearance.

The Turbo-Hydramatic heavy-duty three-speed automatic transmission became available during development of the Toronado. Called the TH425 in FWD form, the transmission's torque converter was separated from its planetary gearset, with the torque converter driving the gearset through a 2 in (51 mm) wide silent chain-drive called Hy-Vo, riding on two 7.5 in (19 cm) sprockets. The Hy-Vo chain drive was developed by GM's Hydra-Matic Division and the Morse Chain Division of Borg-Warner. The chains were made from very strong hardened steel and required no tensioners or idler pulleys because they were pre-stretched on a special machine at the factory. Although the rotational direction of the transmission gears had to be reversed, a large number of components were shared with the conventional TH400. Use of the automatic also eliminated the need to devise a workable manual-shift linkage. No manual transmission was contemplated because performance was adequate with the automatic transmission and because virtually all U.S.-built luxury cars during this period came with automatic transmissions as standard equipment. The car's 0–60 mph (0–97 km/h) time was clocked at 9.5 seconds.

The Toronado used a subframe that ended at the forward end of the rear suspension leaf springs, serving as an attachment point for the springs. It carried the powertrain, front suspension and floorpan, allowing greater isolation of road and engine harshness.

To fit into the tight space, Oldsmobile adopted torsion bars for the Toronado's front suspension (the first GM passenger car application of torsion bars in the U.S., but still not up to Packard's automatic ride leveling system), with conventional, unequal-length double wishbones. Rear Toronado suspension was a simple beam axle on single leaf springs, unusual only in having dual shock absorbers, one vertical, one horizontal (allowing it to act as a radius rod to control wheel movement).

Brakes were hydraulically operated 11 in (279 mm) drums, and were generally considered the Toronado's weak link. As a rather heavy car, after several panic stops the brake drums would overheat, resulting in considerable fade and long stopping distances. The 1967 addition of vented front disc brakes as an option provided substantial improvement. The Toronado's UPP enabled the interior to have a completely flat floor, but interior space (primarily rear seat headroom) was somewhat restricted by the fastback styling.

As with many coupes, the Toronado featured elongated doors to allow easier access for passengers entering the rear seats. Duplicate door-latch handles were added at the rear of each door enabling back seat passengers to open the doors without having to reach over or around the front seat, a feature also available on the other two E-bodies, continuing until 1980 on the Eldorado. Options included headrests ($52) and a tilt-telescopic steering column.

Drivers faced a highly stylized steering wheel with a double-delta shaped horn ring which framed the view of an unusual "slot-machine" style speedometer, consisting of a stationary horizontal "needle" and a vertically rotating black drum on which the numerals were printed in white. The numerals descended behind the needle as the vehicle gained speed. All other gauges, indicators and controls were grouped within fairly easy reach of the driver.

Despite an average weight of 4,500 lb (2,041 kg), published performance test data shows the 1966 Toronado was capable of accelerating from 0–60 mph (0–97 km/h) in 7.5 seconds, and through the standing 1/4 mile (400 m) in 16.4 seconds at 93 mph (150 km/h). It was also capable of a maximum speed of 135 mph (217 km/h). Testers found the Toronado's handling, despite its noticeable front weight bias and consequent understeer, was not substantially different from other full-size U.S. cars when driven under normal conditions. In fact, testers felt that the Toronado was more poised and responsive than other cars, and when pushed to the limits, exhibited superior handling characteristics, although it was essentially incapable of terminal oversteer.

The 1966 model was widely recognized as a step forward in design, gaining publicity for the division by winning several leading automotive awards, such as Motor Trend's Car of the Year Award and Car Life's Award for Engineering Excellence. It was also the second American car to ever be awarded recognition in Europe, as the third-place finisher at the European Car of the Year competition in 1966.

The Toronado sold reasonably well at introduction, with 40,963 produced for 1966. Some television commercials featured former NASA Project Mercury public affairs officer John "Shorty" Powers, Oldsmobile's primary commercial spokesperson of the era, along with racing legend Bobby Unser driving the vehicle and commenting favorably on the Toronado's handling.

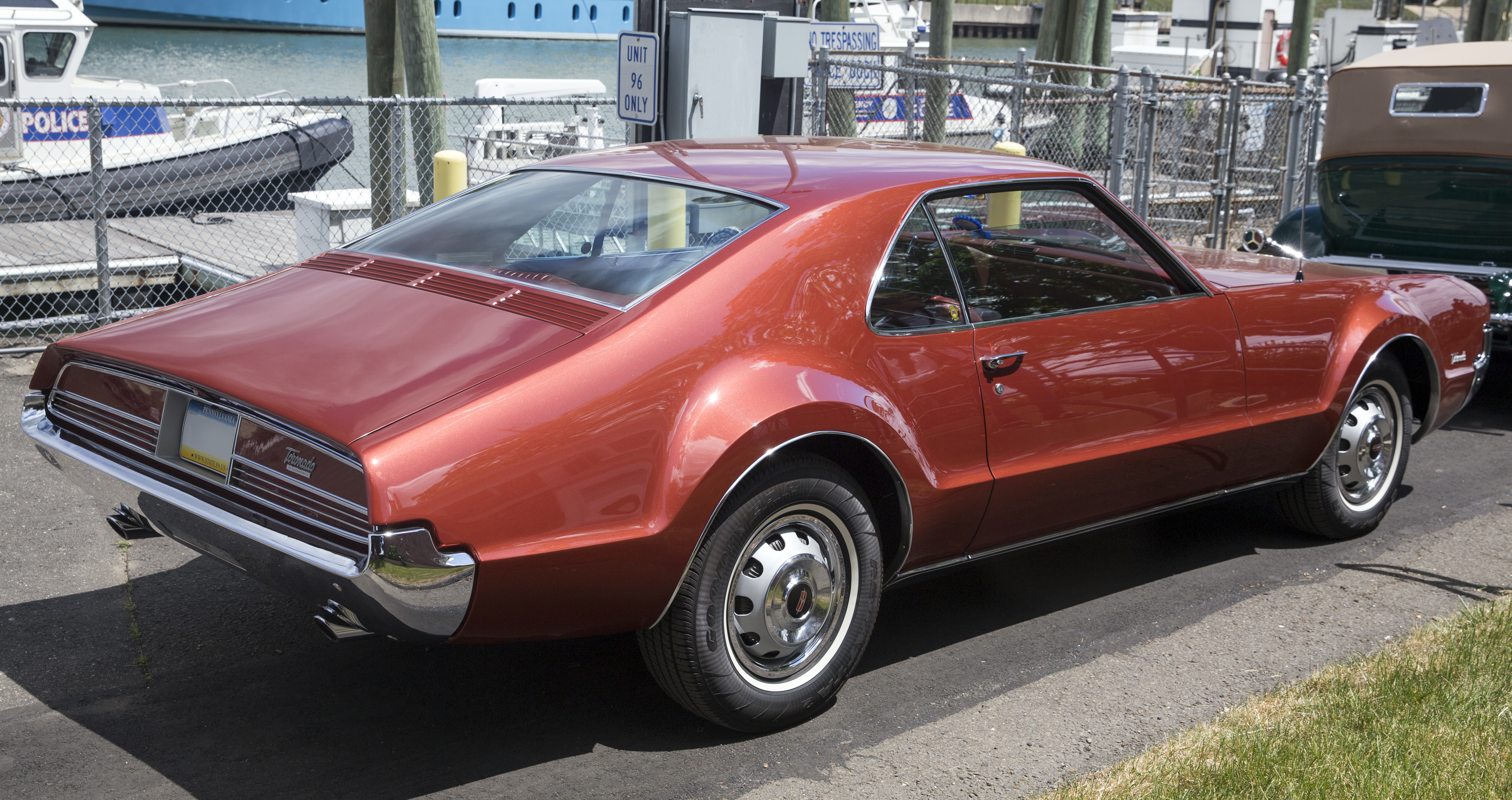
1966 Toronado; rear view

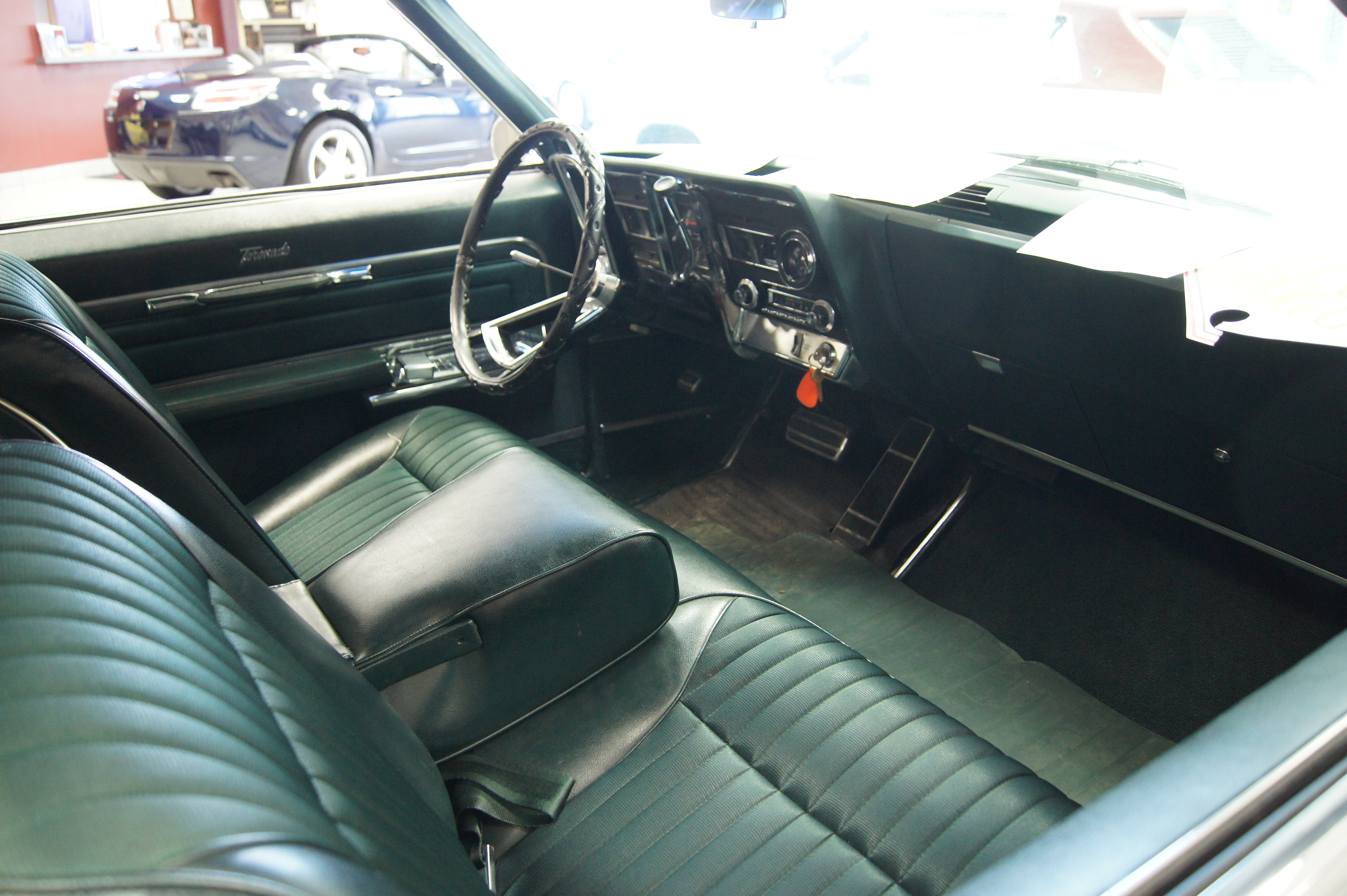
1966 Toronado interior

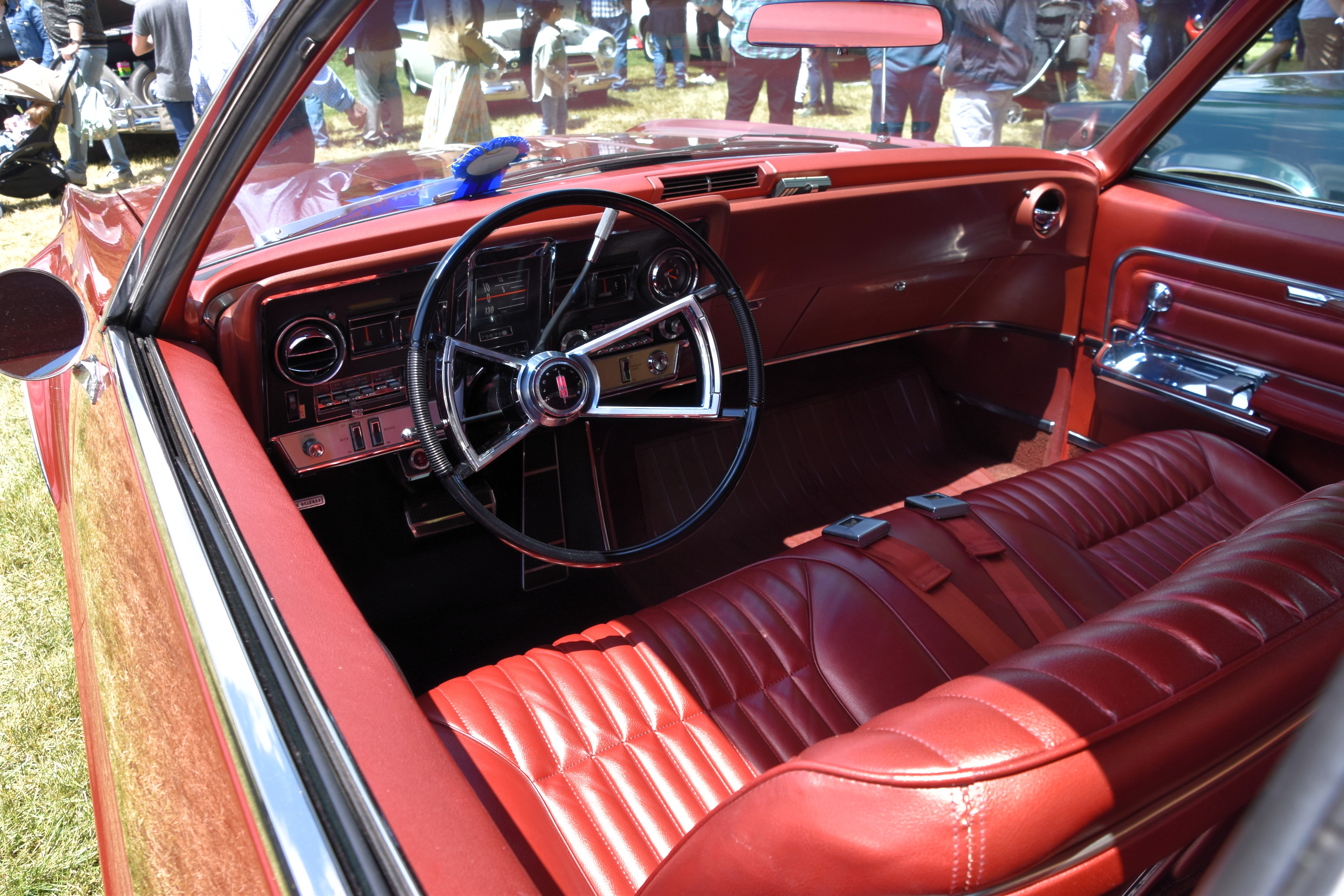
1966 Toronado interior

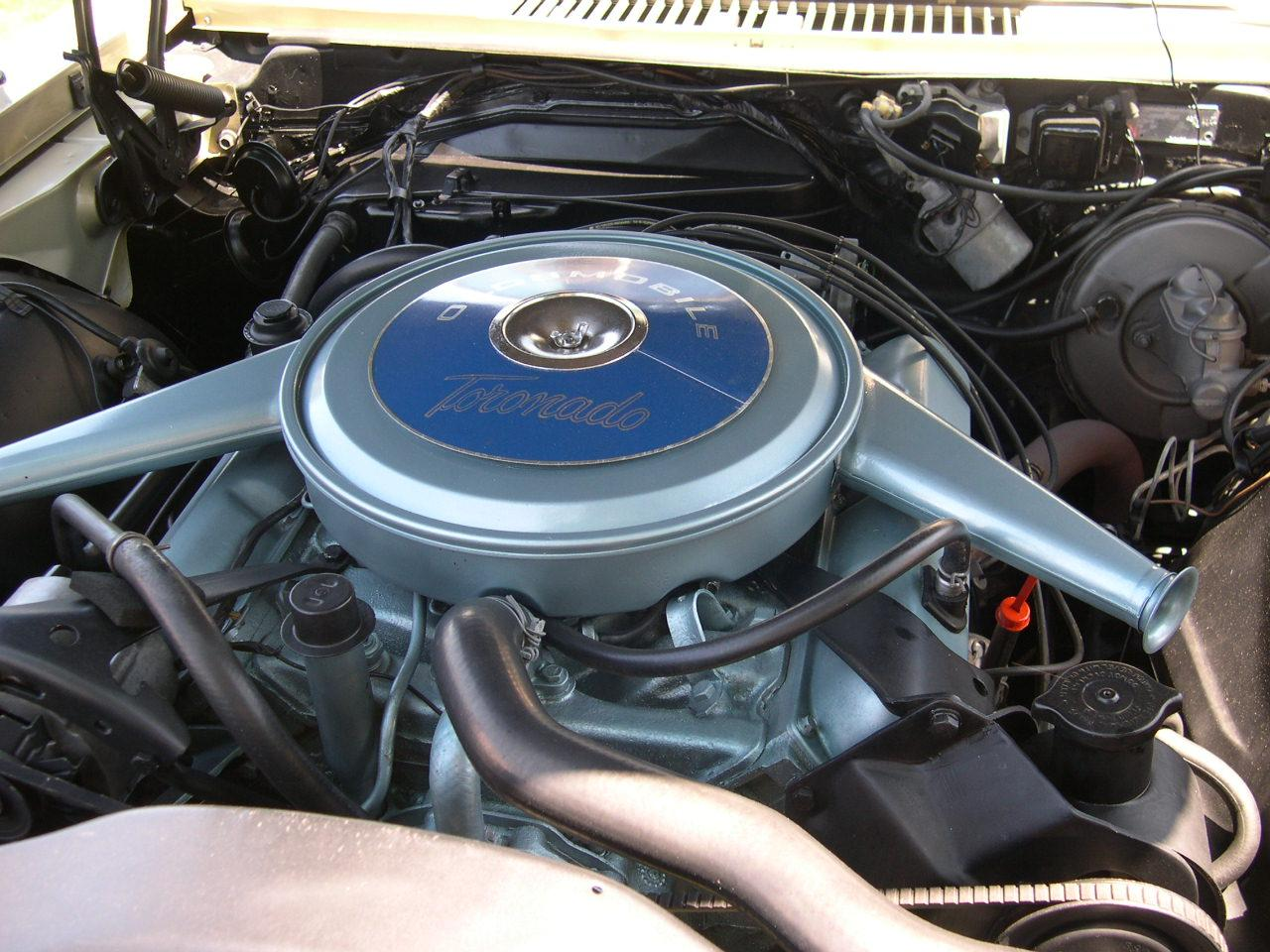
The 1967 Toronado's 425 cubic-inch Super Rocket V8 engine

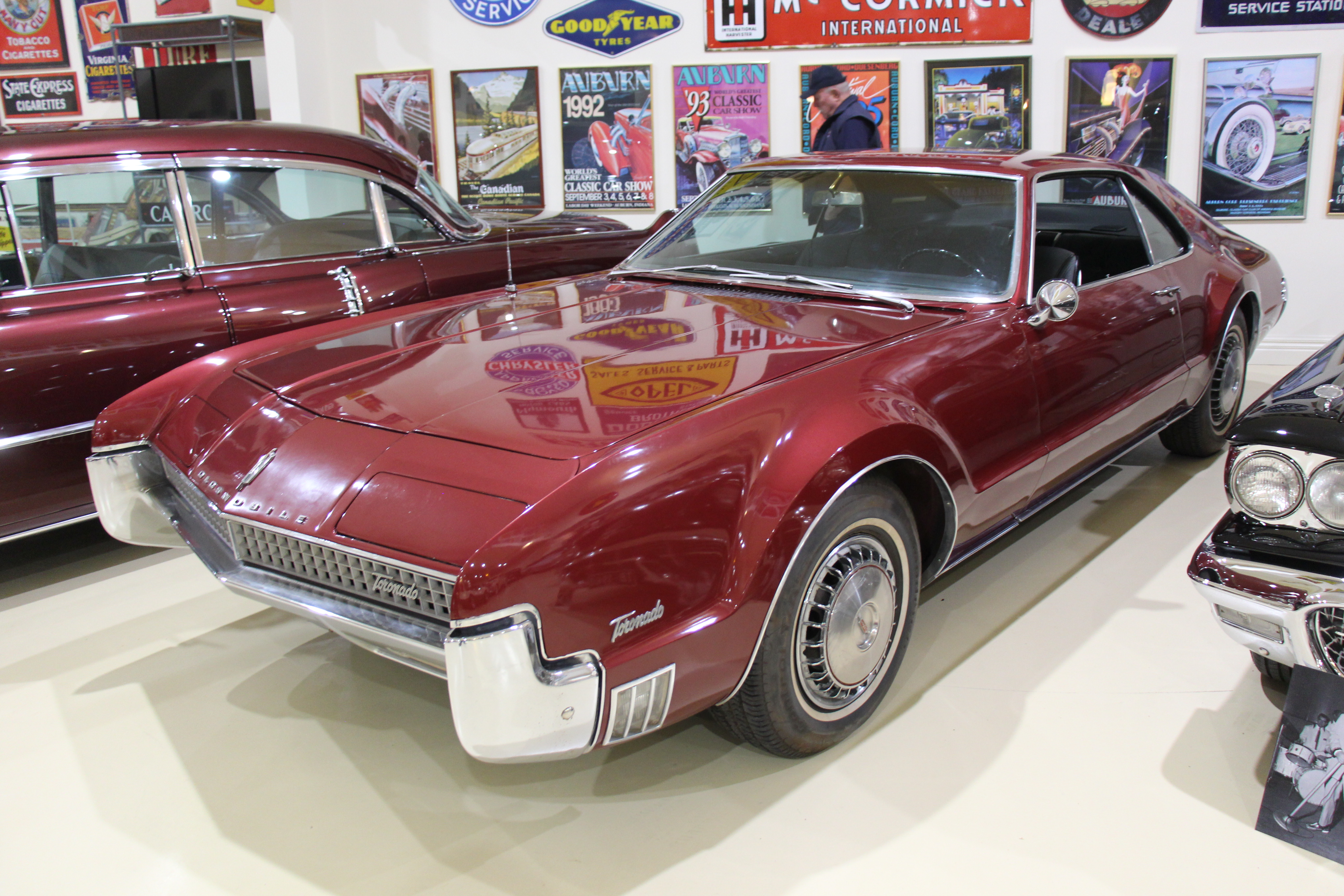
1967 Oldsmobile Toronado

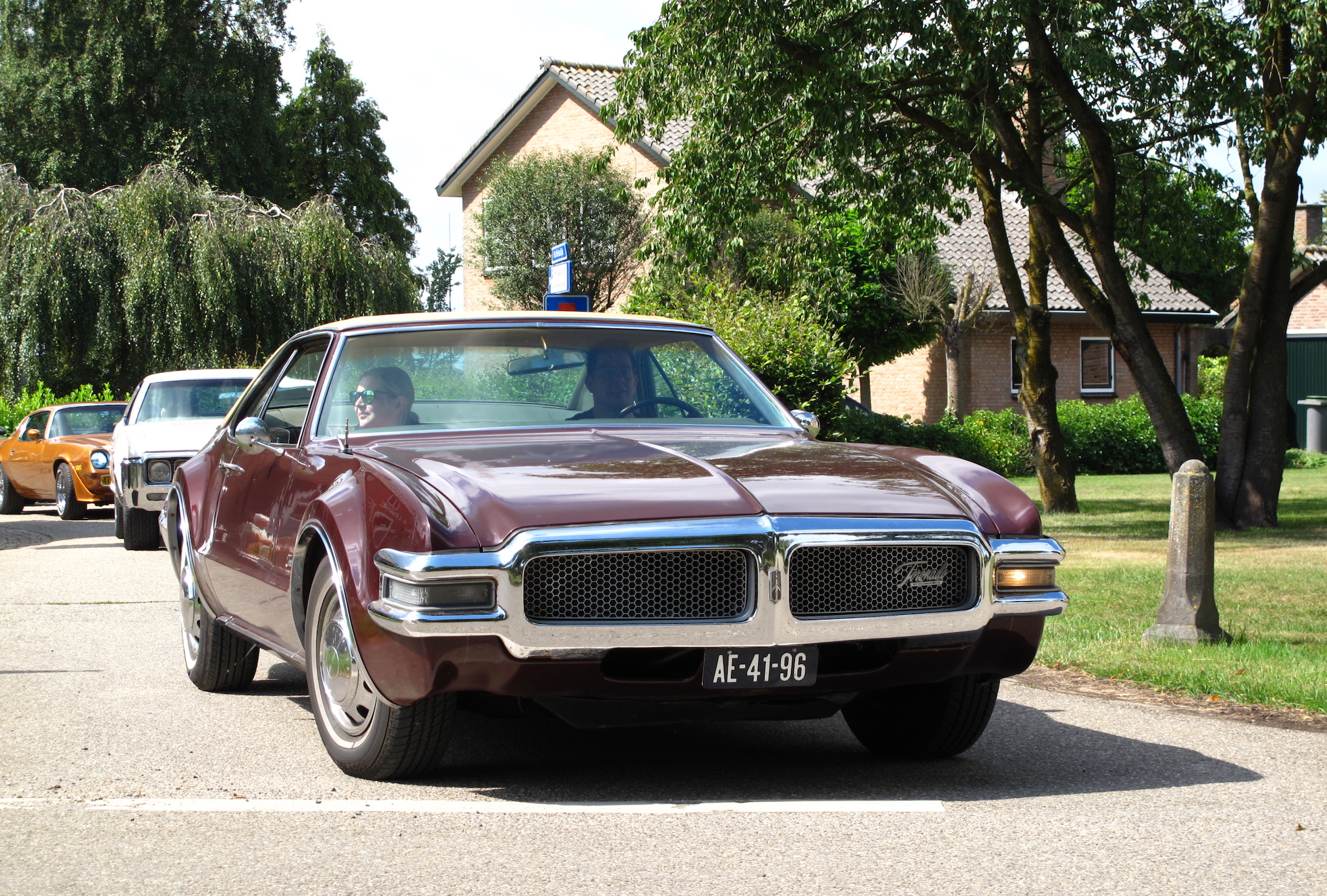
1968 Oldsmobile Toronado

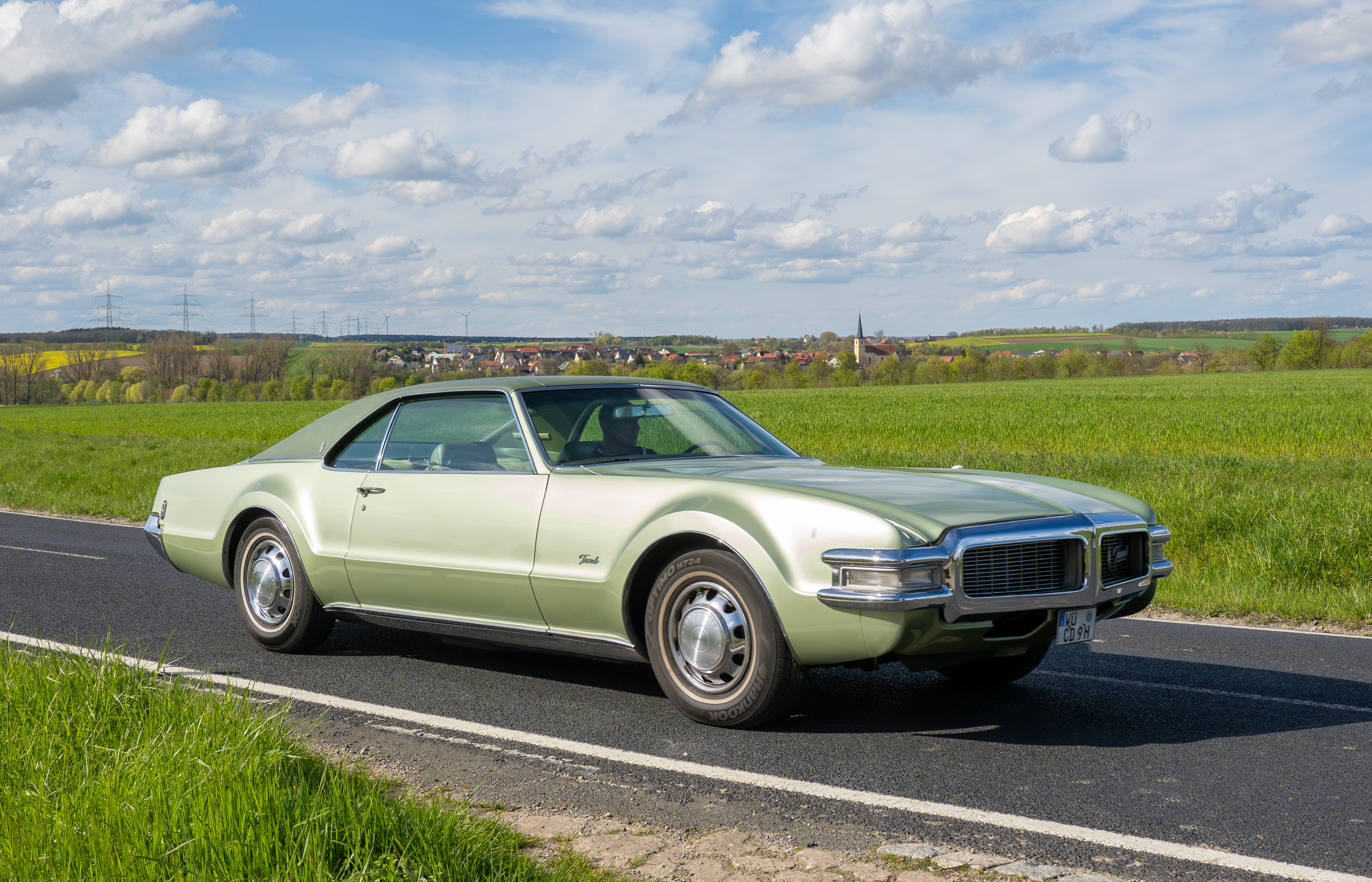
1969 Oldsmobile Toronado

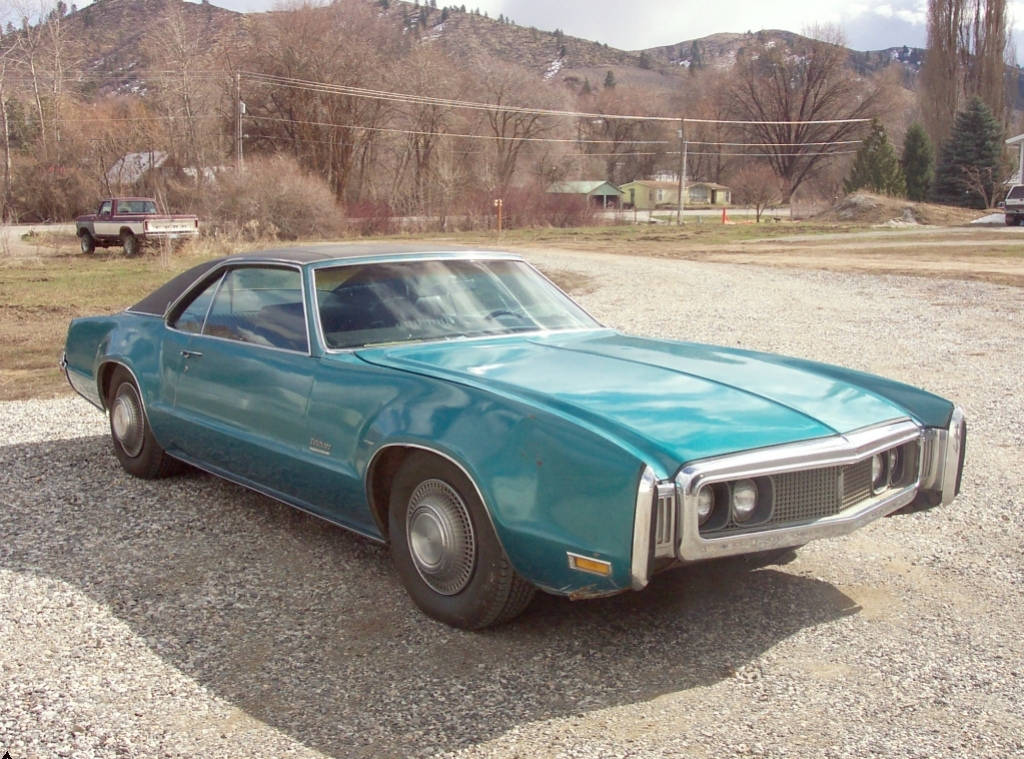
1970 Oldsmobile Toronado

Sales for the 1967 model, which was distinguished by a slight facelift, the addition of optional disc brakes, and a slightly softer ride, dropped by nearly half, to 22,062. A stereo tape player was optional. It would be 1971 before the Toronado matched its first-year sales volume.

In 1967, Cadillac adopted its own version of the UPP for the Cadillac Eldorado, using the Cadillac V8 engine. The Eldorado also shared the E-body shell with the Toronado and Riviera, but its radically different styling meant that the three cars did not look at all similar. Also, despite sharing the same platform as the Toronado and Eldorado, the Riviera retained its rear-wheel drive setup, and would not convert to front-wheel drive until the platform was downsized in 1979.

The first-generation Toronado persisted with the usual annual facelifts through 1970. Other than the brakes, the major changes were the replacement of the original 425 cu in (7 L) V8 with the new 455 cu in (7.5 L) in 1968, rated at 375 hp (280 kW) in standard form or 400 hp (298 kW) with the W-34 option, revised rear quarter panels (with small fins to disguise the slope of the rear body in side view) in 1969, and the elimination of hidden headlights and the introduction of squared wheel arch bulges in 1970. An ignition lock was added in 1969.

Slight interior cosmetic changes were made for each new model year, and a full-length center console with floor-mounted shifter was available as an extra-cost option with the Strato bucket seats from 1968 to 1970, though few Toronados were so ordered. The vast majority of customers went for the standard Strato bench seat to take full advantage of the flatter floor resulting from the front-drive. The lack of a "hump" in the floor made three-abreast seating more comfortable than in rear-drive cars, as the center passengers both front and rear did not have to straddle one.

The firm suspension and thus the quality of the ride, was gradually softened through the years, hinting at what Toronado eventually would become in 1971. A heavy-duty suspension was an option on later first generation Toronados, which included the original torsion bar springs that were used on the 1966 model.

A special option code called W-34 was available on the 1968–70 Toronado. This option included a cold air induction system for the air cleaner, a special performance camshaft and a "GT" transmission calibrated for quick and firm up-shifts and better torque multiplication at 5 mph (8 km/h). Dual exhaust outlets similar to the 1966–67 model years with cutouts in the bumper, were included with W-34. The standard models also had dual exhaust systems, but only a single somewhat hidden outlet running from the muffler exiting rearward on the right side. For 1970 only, the W-34 option also included special "GT" badges on the exterior of the car. The W-34 Toronado was capable of 0–60 mph in 7.5 seconds and the standing 1/4 mile in 15.7 seconds at 89.8 mph (144.5 km/h).

Manufacturer's specifications

- Engine: 1966–1967 – 425 cu in (7 L) OHV V8, 1968–1970 – 455 cu in (7.5 L) OHV V8
- Power: 1966–1967 – 385 hp (287 kW) at 4800 rpm, 1968–1970 – 375 hp (280 kW) at 4400 rpm, 400 hp (298 kW) at 5000 rpm with option code W-34
- Torque: 1966–1967 – 475 lb⋅ft (644 N⋅m) at 3200 rpm, 1968–1970 – 510 lb⋅ft (691 N⋅m) at 3000 rpm, 500 lb⋅ft (678 N⋅m) at 3200 rpm with option code W-34
- Transmission: 3-speed automatic, Turbo-Hydramatic 425 (THM-425)
- Final drive ratio: 1966–1967 – 3.21:1, 1968–70 – 3.07:1
- Wheelbase: 119 in (3,000 mm)
- Overall length: 1966–1967 – 211 in (5,400 mm), 1968 – 211.6 in (5,370 mm), 1969–70 – 214.8 in (5,460 mm)
- Overall height: 52.8 in (1,340 mm)
- Overall width: 78.5 in (1,990 mm)
- Track, front/rear: 63.5 in (1,610 mm) / 63 in (1,600 mm)
- Weight, shipping/curb: 4,311 lb (1,955 kg)/ 4,496 lb (2,039 kg)
- Weight distribution, front/rear (%): 60.3/39.7

== Second generation (1971–1978) ==
Second generation
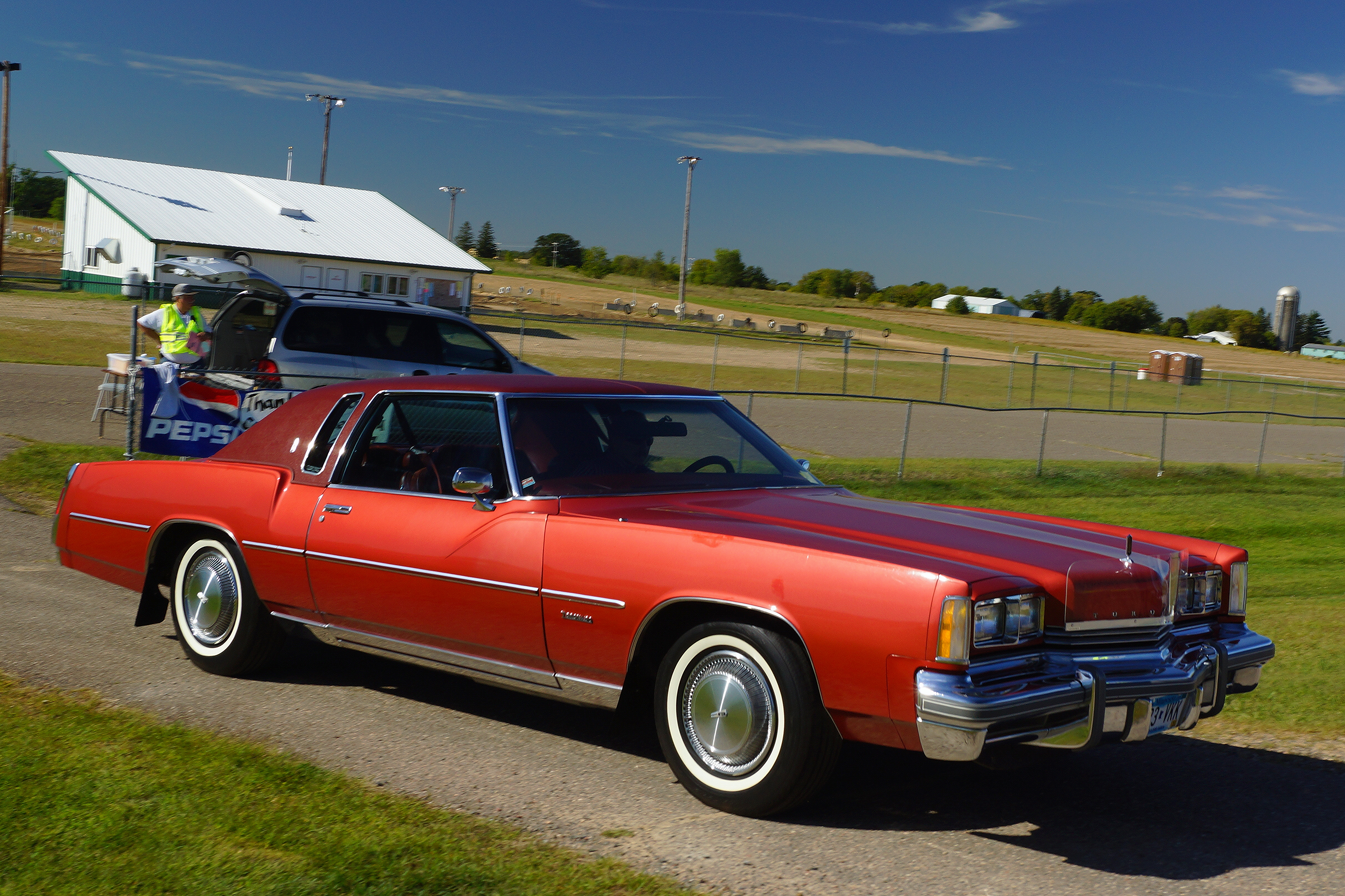
- 1976 Oldsmobile Toronado

Overview
- Production: 1970–1978
- Model years: 1971–1978
- Assembly: United States: Lansing, Michigan (Lansing Car Assembly)
- Designer: David North

Powertrain
- Engine: 455 cu in (7.5 L) Rocket V8; 403 cu in (6.6 L) Oldsmobile V8
- Transmission: 3-speed TH-425 automatic

Dimensions
- Wheelbase: 122 in (3,099 mm)
- Length: 219.9 in (5,585 mm)
- Width: 79.8 in (2,027 mm)
- Height: 54.7 in (1,389 mm)
- Curb weight: 4,841 pounds (2,196 kg)

With heavily revised styling from the first generation, the Toronado transitioned from a "GT"-style car into a more traditional luxury car. It was now more similar to the Cadillac Eldorado than the Buick Riviera (which would be redesigned in 1974, then again in 1977), with styling taking several cues from the 1967–1970 Eldorado. Sales increased dramatically. Front disc brakes became standard. The front end used a novel air induction system, splitting the airflow from below the headlights, in a "bottom breather" fashion. When United States Federal bumper standards were implemented, the front air intake was phased out for a conventional approach from below the bumper.

All overall dimensions of the 1971 Toronado were larger than previous models with wheelbase increased from 119 to 122 in (3,100 mm), only 2 in (51 mm) less than the full-sized Oldsmobile Delta 88. Additionally, the subframe design of first-generation Toronados was replaced by a separate body-on-frame similar to full-sized Delta 88 and Ninety-Eight models. The front torsion bar suspension was retained, but the multi-leaf springs in the rear were replaced by coil springs. In addition, the Toronado introduced as a novelty what later became a federal mandate in a modified form, two high-mounted taillights above the trunk and below the rear window, which was shared on its platform twin, the Riviera. These taillights mirrored brake and turn functions of the normal taillights, but not the nighttime taillights. A rear-wheel ABS became optional.

The 455 cubic-inch (7.46 L) Rocket V8 was carried over from previous models as the standard Toronado engine. The introduction of the second-generation Toronado coincided with the implementation of a GM corporate edict that took effect with the 1971 models; all engines had to run on lower-octane regular leaded, low lead or unleaded gasoline to meet increasingly stringent Federal (and California) emission control regulations, which was achieved by reducing compression ratios. This was a first step toward the introduction of catalytic converters in 1975, which mandated the use of unleaded fuel. The 1971 Toronado's 455 cubic-inch V8 (7.46 L) was rated at 350 hp (261 kW) (down from 375 in 1970) with a compression ratio of 8.5:1 (down from 10.5:1 in 1970).

For 1972, the advertised rating for the 455 engine dropped to 250 hp (186 kW) thanks to a switch in power measurement to "net" ratings which were measured as installed in a vehicle with all accessories and emissions equipment attached. By 1976, the last year for the 455 engine in the Toronado, the net rating dropped to 215 hp (160 kW).

The 1971–1978 generation is mainly noted for the early use of two safety features that are now standard on all cars in the United States, the aforementioned high-mounted taillights (although a somewhat similar feature had appeared briefly as an option on the Ford Thunderbird in the late 1960s) and, from 1974 through 1976, the Toronado was part of GM's first experimental production run of driver- and passenger-side airbags, which GM named the Air Cushion Restraint System. These Toronados used a unique steering wheel and were fitted with a knee blocker beneath the driver's portion of the dashboard.

Styling/engineering highlights through the years included disc brakes with audible wear indicators for 1972, a federally mandated 5 mph (8 km/h) front bumper along with new vertical taillights in 1973, a stand-up hood ornament, 5 mph rear bumper and optional fixed rear side opera windows in 1974 and rectangular headlights in 1975.

The 1973 Toronado went on sale in September 1972 and has a combined fuel economy of between 8.5 and 10.9 miles per gallon. The 1975 through 1978 Toronados had a fuel tank that could hold 26 gallons of gasoline, whereas the 1973 Toronado had a 25.9 gallon capacity fuel tank with 250 horsepower and an axle ratio of 2.73:1. The 1973 Toronado was made from September 1972 to September 1973.

During most of the Toronado's second-generation run, two interior trims were generally offered each year. The standard interior trim consisted of a choice of cloth or vinyl upholstery and a Custom Sport notchback bench seat with center armrest. An optional Brougham interior available in cloth, velour or vinyl trims included cut-pile carpeting, door-mounted courtesy lighting and a split 60/40 bench seat with armrest. From 1971 to 1973, the Toronado's "Command Center" wrap-around instrument panel was similar to other full-sized Oldsmobiles featuring a large squared speedometer directly in front of the driver, heating/air conditioning and lights/wipers switches on the left hand side and the radio controls and cigar lighter on the right hand side. From 1974 to 1978, a flat instrument panel (again shared with Delta 88 and Ninety-Eight models) was used that featured a horizontal sweep speedometer flanked by a "Message Center" of warning lights, fuel gauge and shift quadrant, with the other controls in the same locations as in previous years.

As befitting a luxury car, Toronados featured a long list of standard equipment that included Turbo-Hydramatic transmission, variable-ratio power steering, power front disc brakes along with an electric clock, carpeting and deluxe wheel covers. Virtually all Toronados' were sold loaded with extra-cost options including air conditioning, AM/FM stereo with 8-track tape player, power trunk release, vinyl roof, tilt and telescopic steering wheel, cruise control, power windows, power door locks and six-way power seats. Power windows became standard equipment in 1975. A new feature in 1974 was a gauge that monitored if the driver was driving economically or not called the Fuel Economy Gauge which was a vacuum pressure gauge that would determine if the accelerator pedal was being pushed too hard.

The later years of this generation of Toronado saw new features mostly confined to minor styling tweaks to the grille and trim, although in 1977, the XS and XSR models debuted. Both featured a three-sided, hot wire "bent-glass" rear window and, on the XSR, electric T-tops which slid inwards at the touch of a button. However, as built in prototype form, the XSR had no means of channeling water away from the retractable sections, and water would inevitably leak into the cabin. No workable solution to the problem was found, and as such, the XSR model was scrapped. The XS, which did enter production, was offered with GM's more reliable (and no doubt more leak-resistant) Astro roof sliding sunroof. Air conditioning was standard.

The running factory "XSR" prototype was documented as "restored" by Collectible Automobile Magazine in the late 1990s.

Also for 1977, the 455 cu in (7.46 L) V8 was replaced by a smaller 403 cu in (6.60 L) engine (rated at 185 hp; 138 kW and 325 lb⋅ft; 441 N⋅m), due mainly to forthcoming government Corporate Average Fuel Economy standards (implemented beginning with the 1978 model year). In addition, the 1977 Delta 88 and Ninety-Eight models, formerly the biggest cars in the Oldsmobile stable, were downsized. For two more model years, the Toronado would be the largest Oldsmobile, and, after the mid-sized Cutlass line's downsizing for 1978, the Toronado looked hopelessly out of place in the lineup, given the industry-wide shift to smaller cars. Also in 1977, when Buick removed the Riviera from the E-body lineup and reassigned it to the B-body LeSabre bodyshell, this meant that all E-bodies would be front-wheel drive only.

This generation was probably helped in the sales race by the radical and controversial "boat-tail" design of the contemporary Buick Riviera, since during this period the Toronado outsold its Buick cousin for the first time. However, the higher-priced Cadillac Eldorado managed to outsell the Toronado in most of these years.

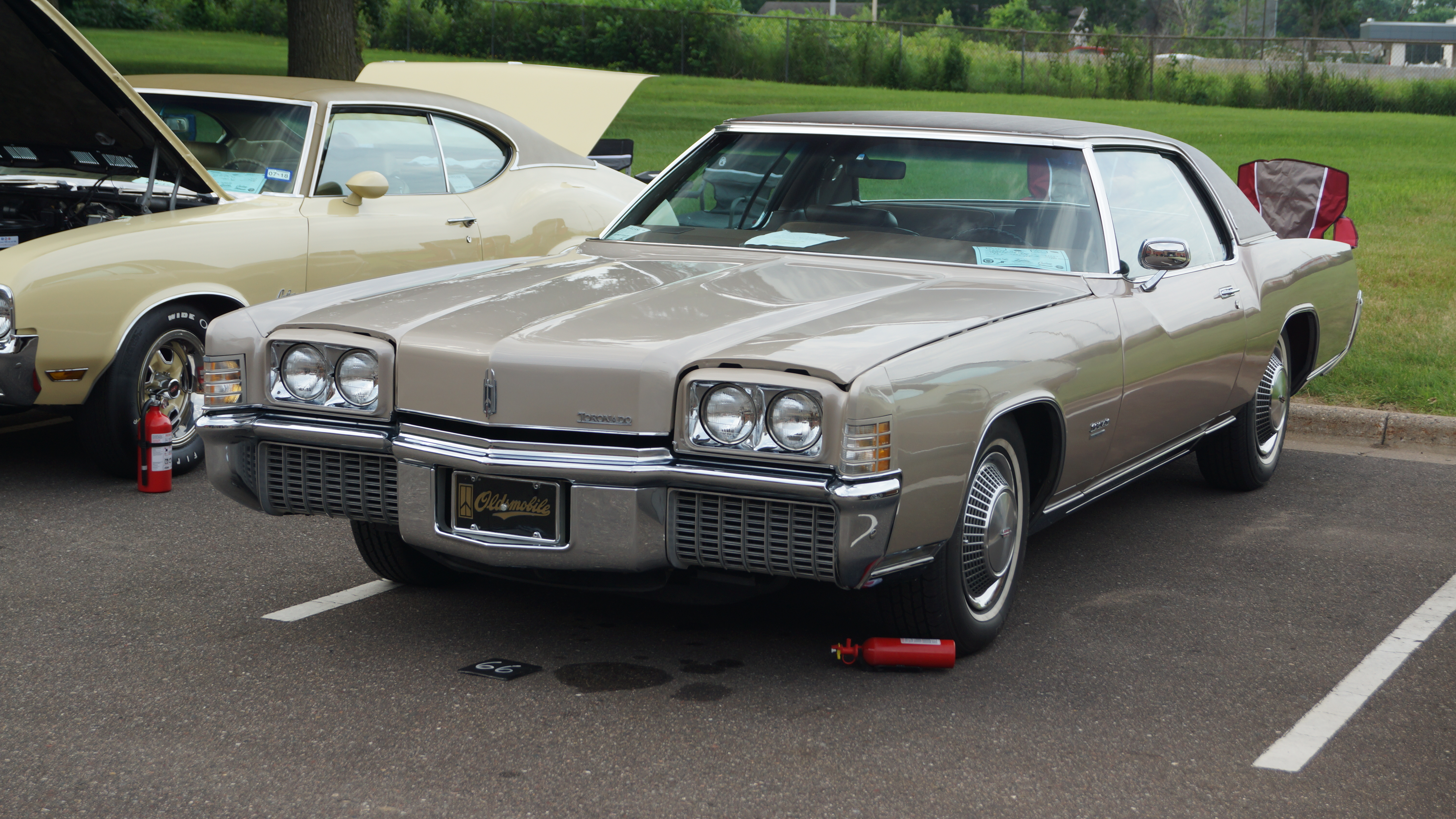
1971 Oldsmobile Toronado

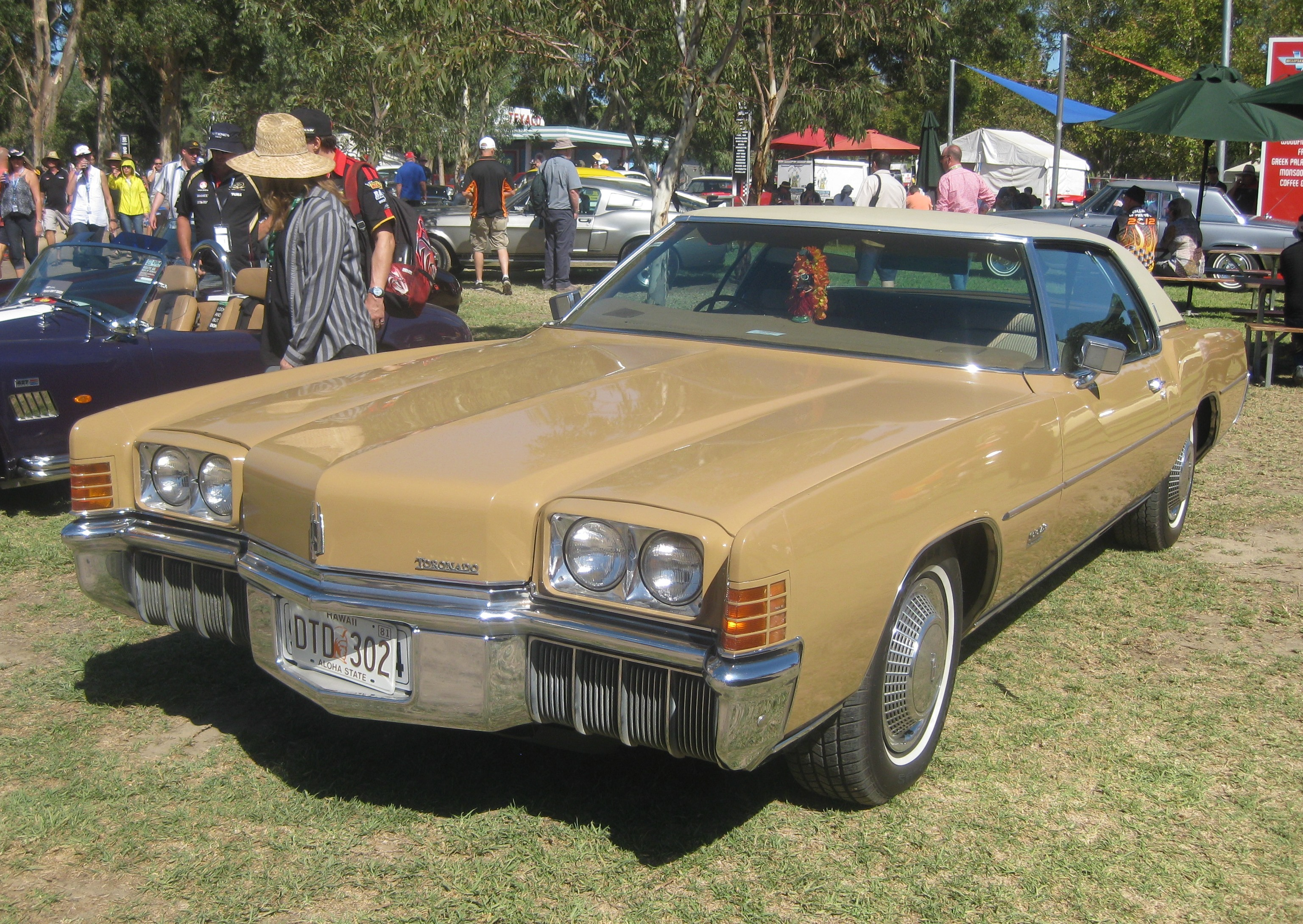
1972 Oldsmobile Toronado

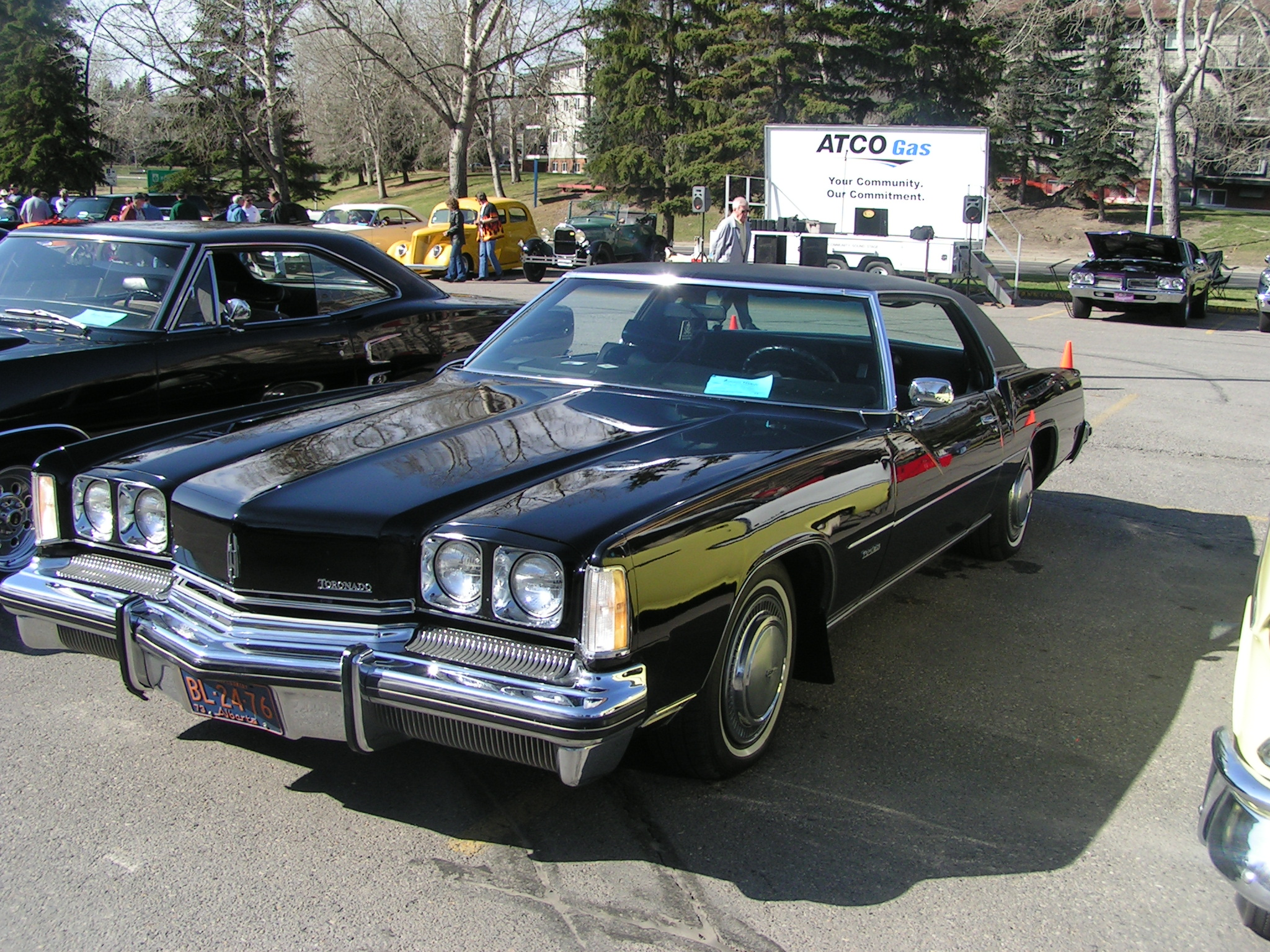
1973 Oldsmobile Toronado

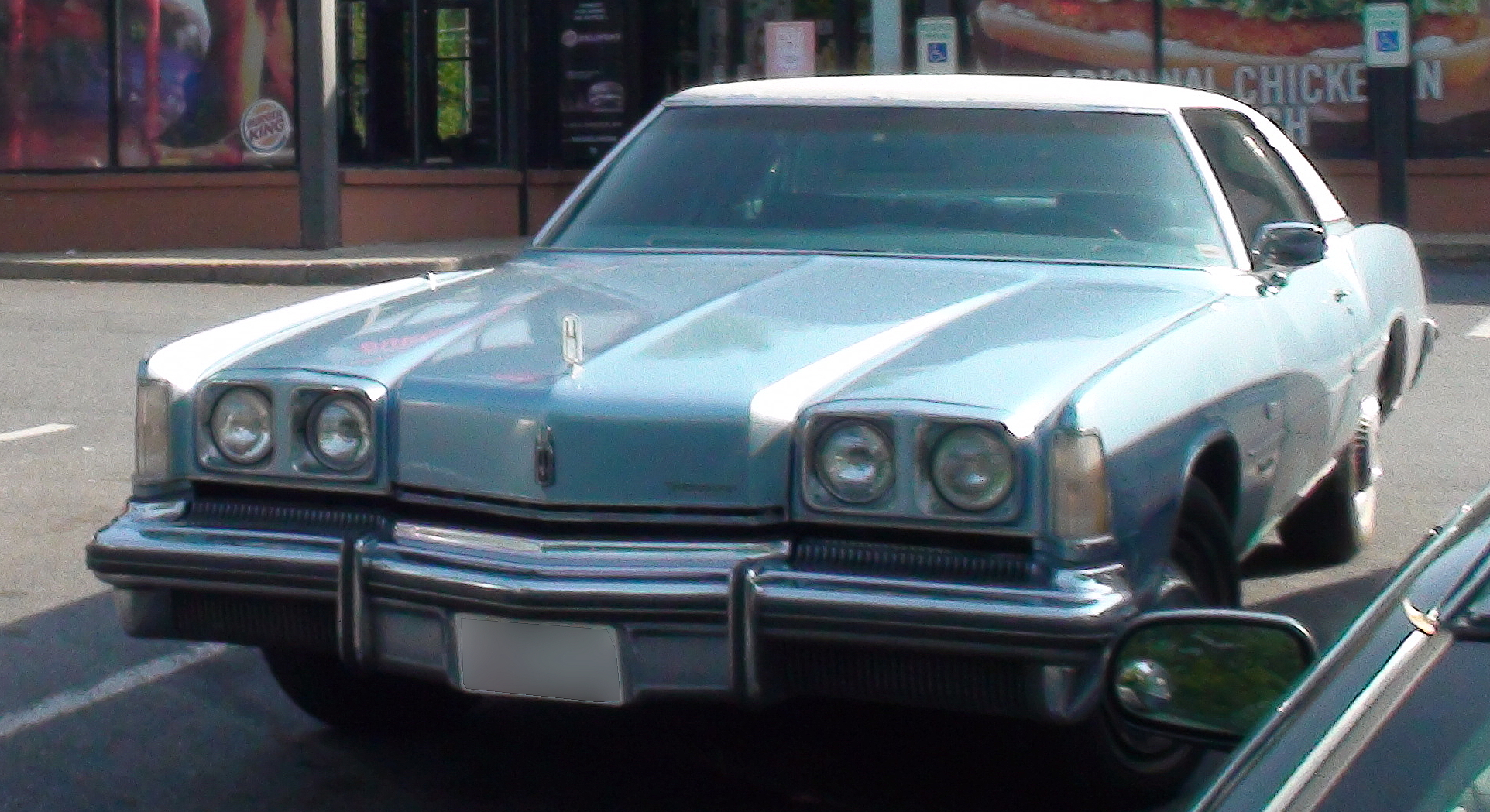
1973 Oldsmobile Toronado Custom

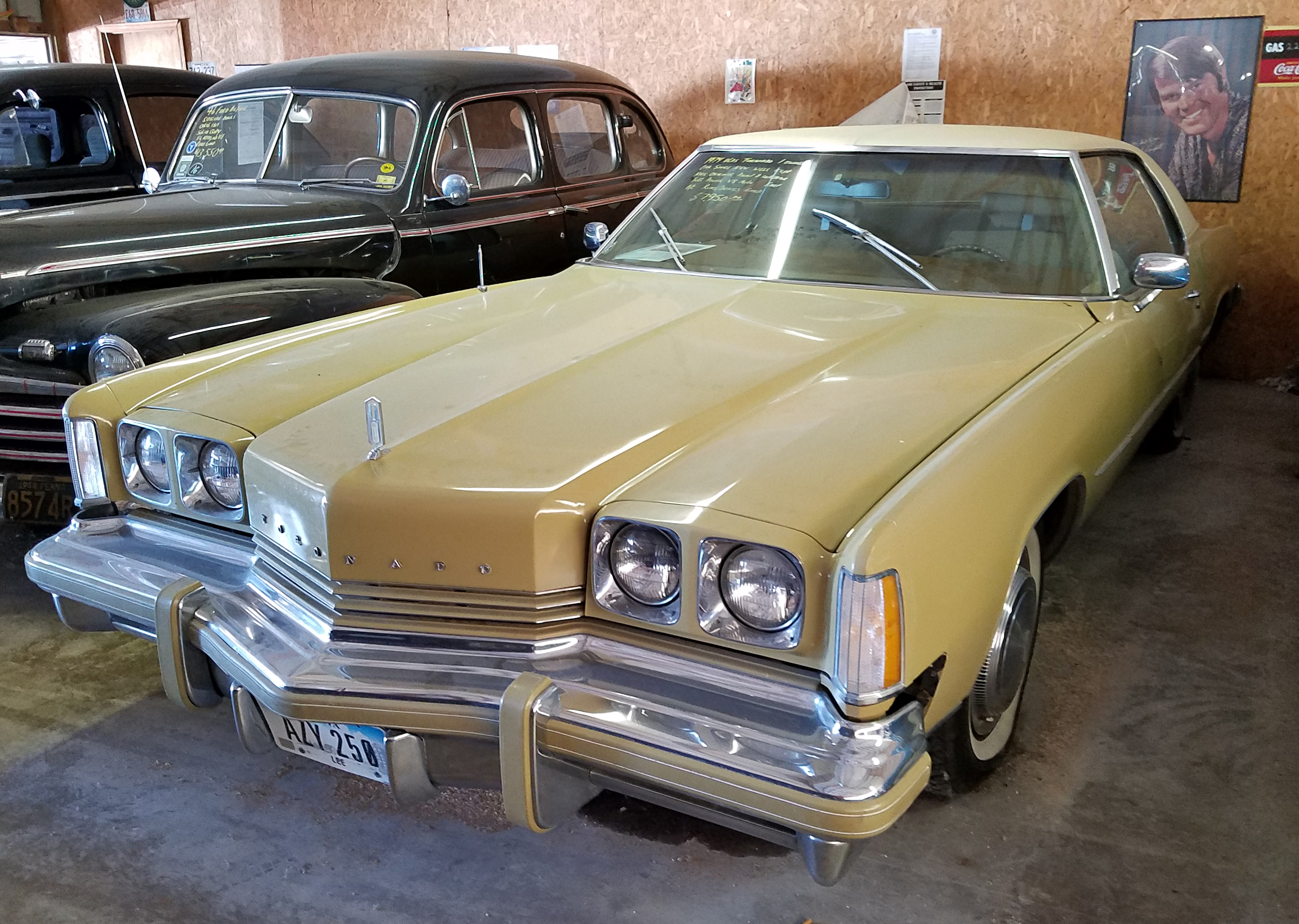
1974 Oldsmobile Toronado

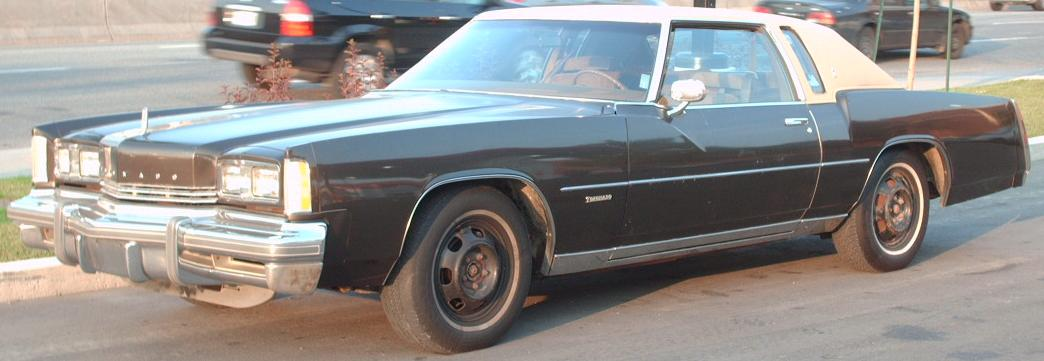
1975 Oldsmobile Toronado

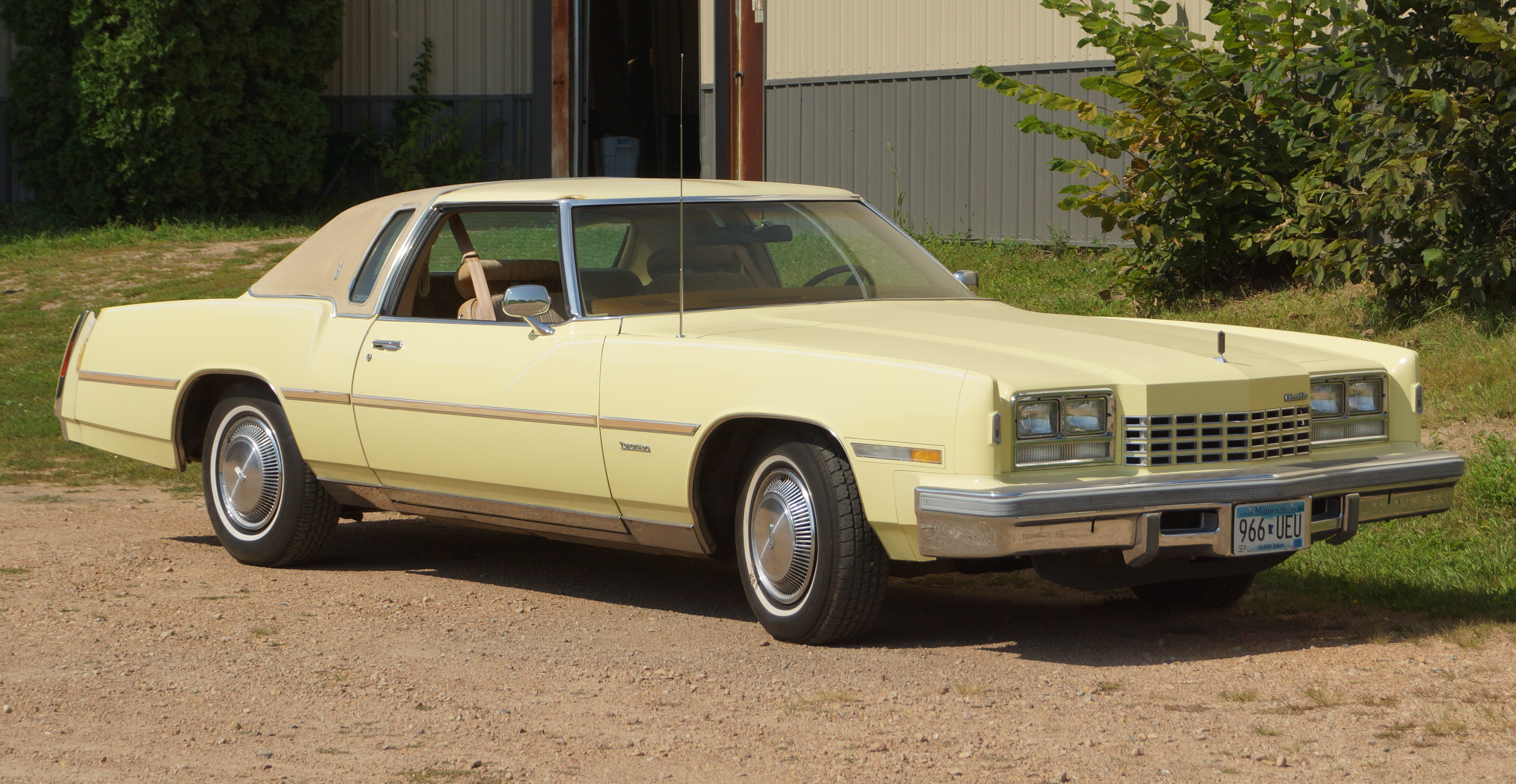
1977 Oldsmobile Toronado Brougham

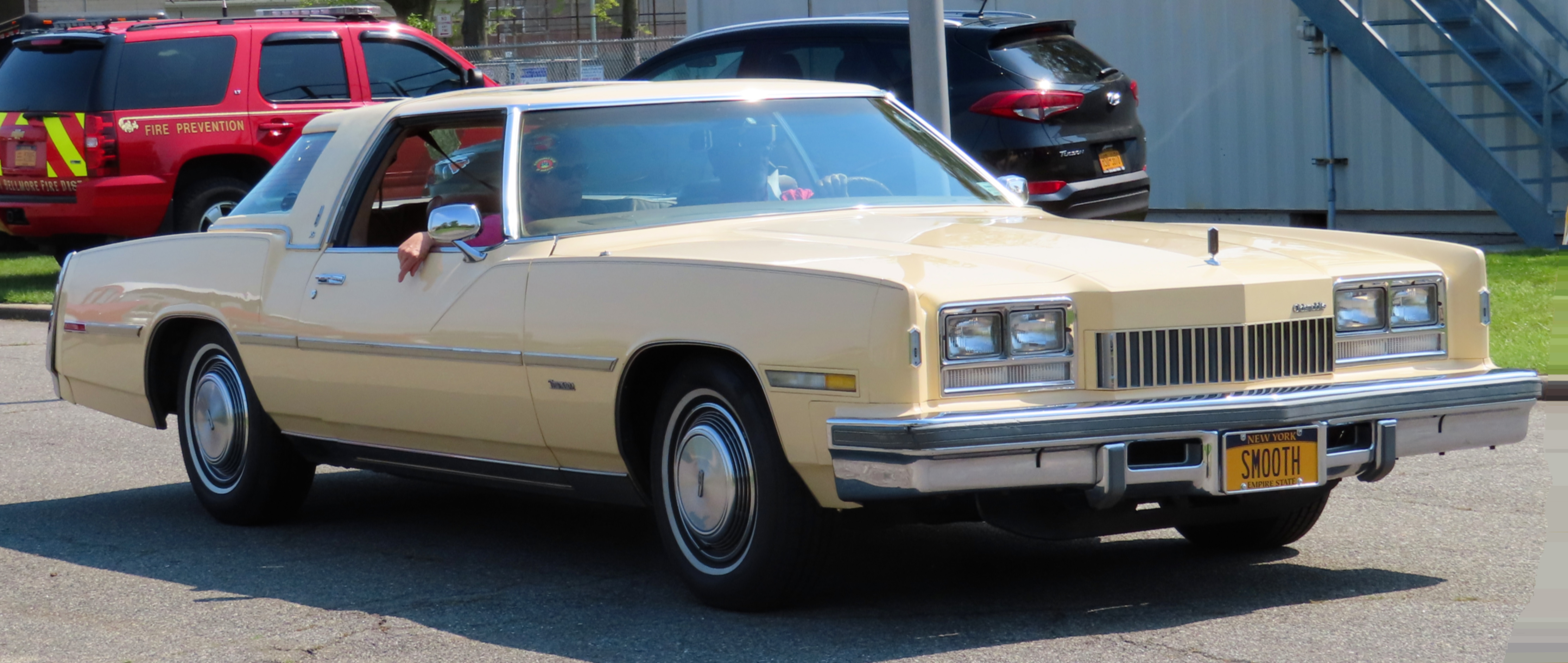
1978 Oldsmobile Toronado XS

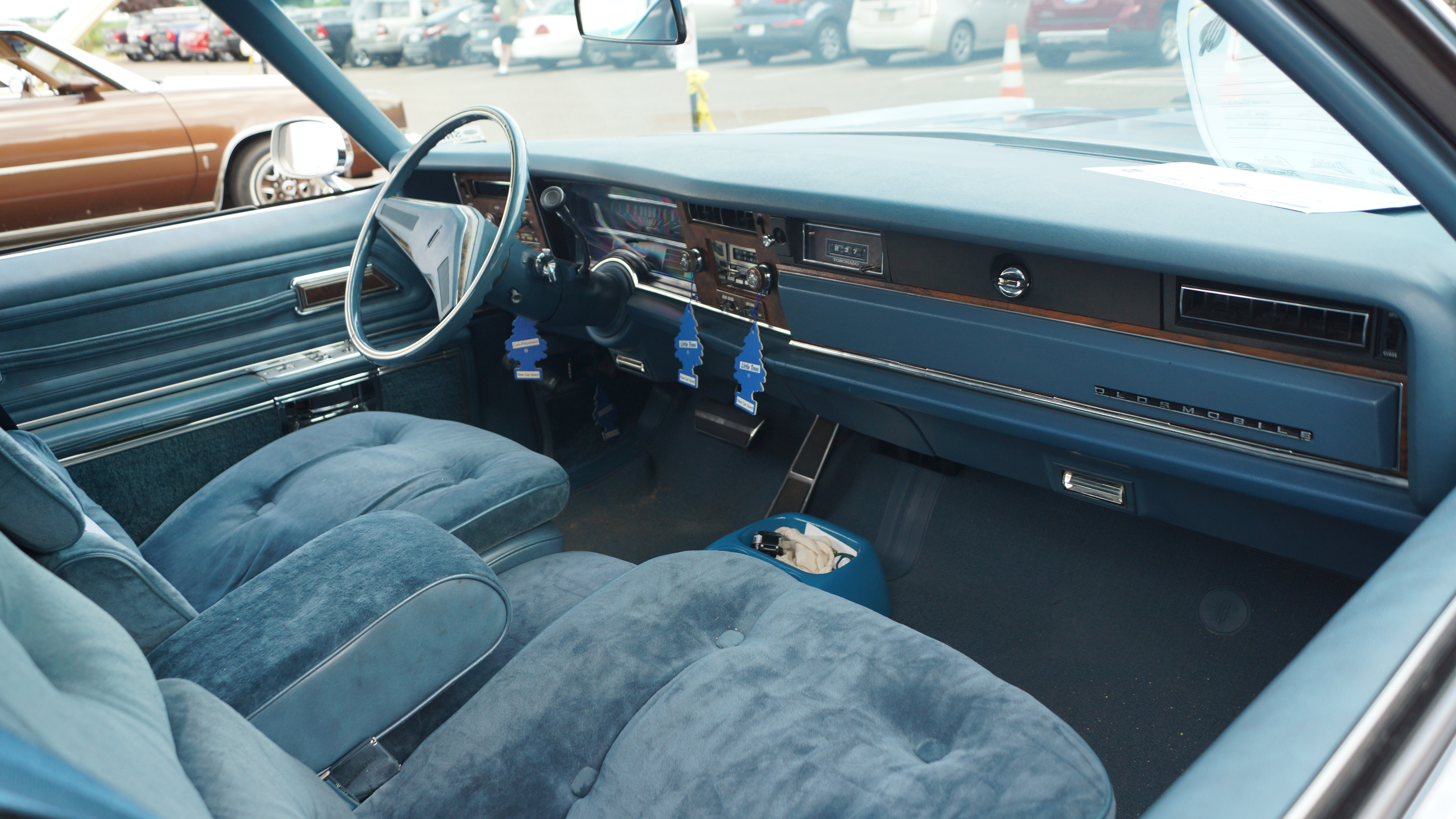
1975 Oldsmobile Toronado Brougham interior

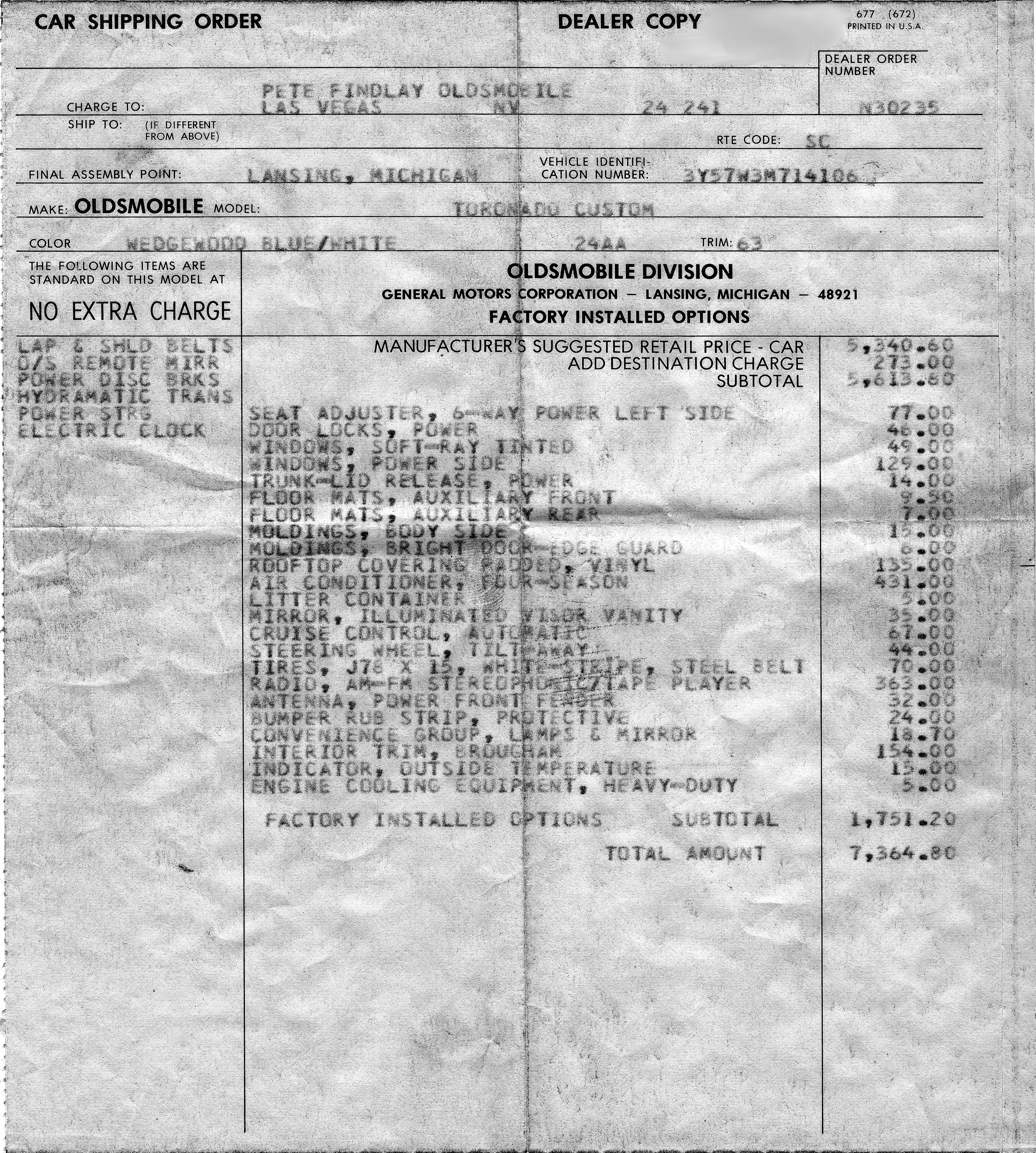
The shipping order of a 1973 Oldsmobile Toronado, listing factory installed options and select standard equipment

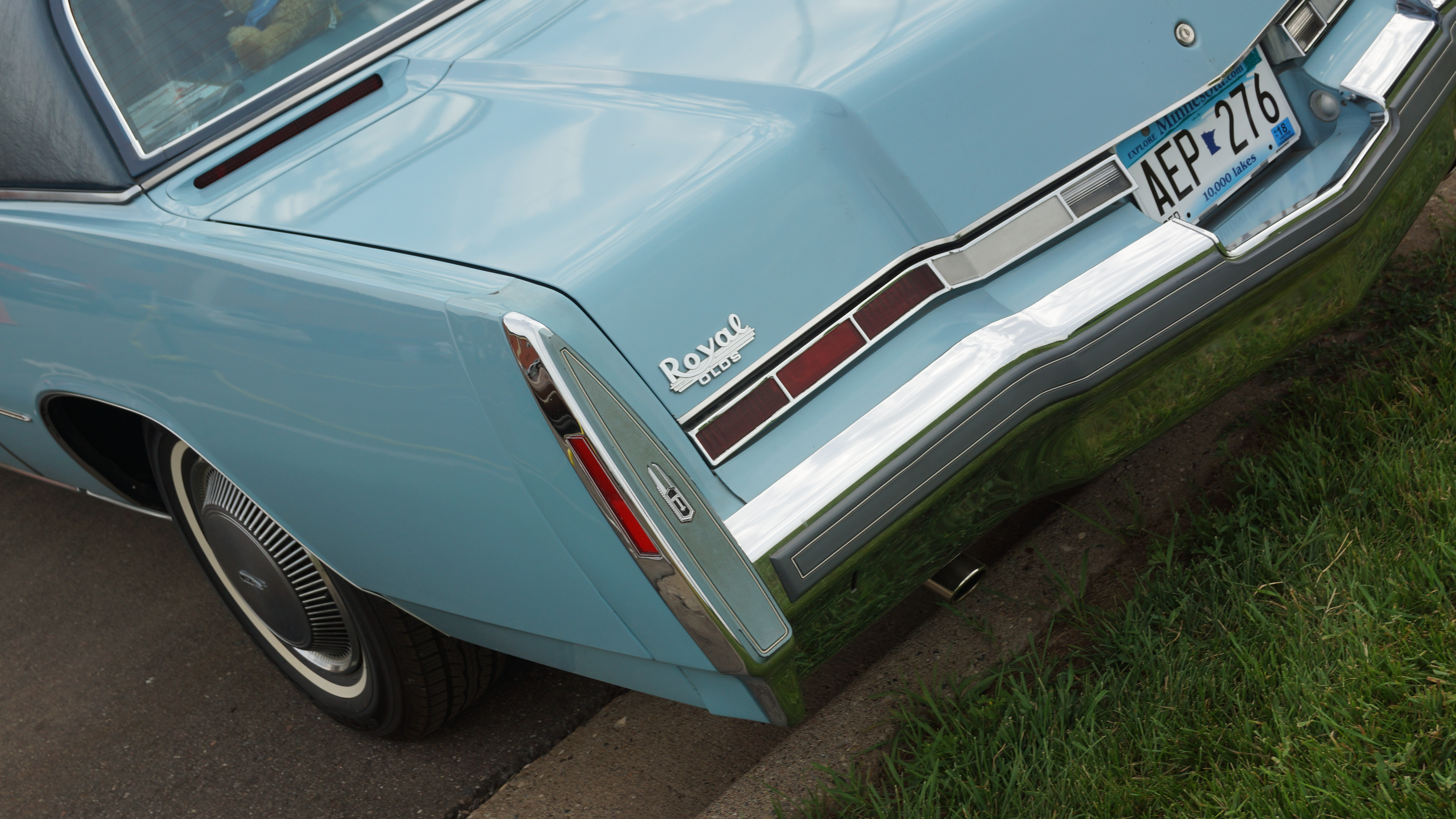
1975 Oldsmobile Toronado high mounted brake and turn signal light above trunklid

== Third generation (1979–1985) ==
Third generation
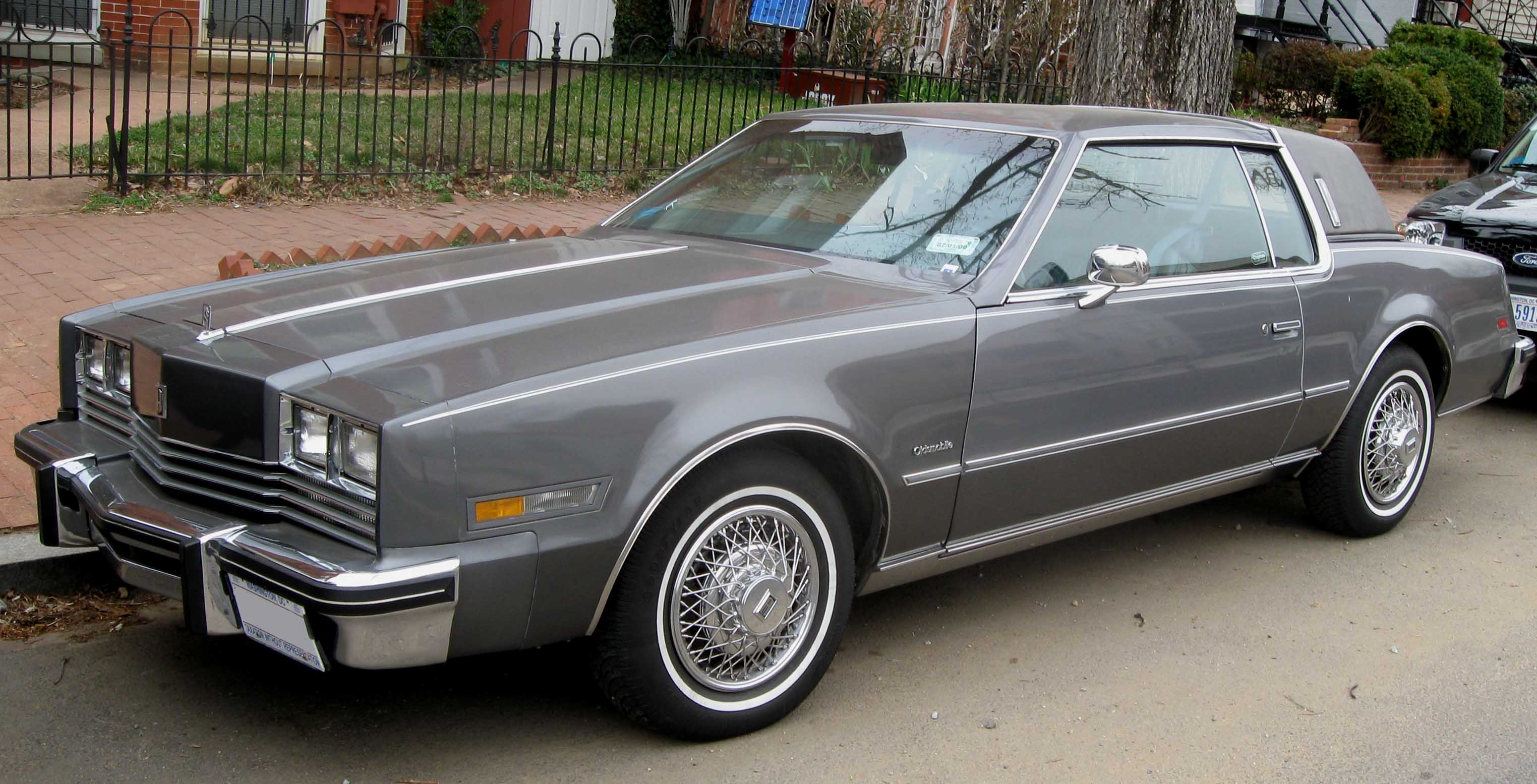

Overview
- Production: 1978–1985
- Model years: 1979–1985
- Assembly: United States: Linden, New Jersey (Linden Assembly)

Body and chassis
- Layout: Longitudinal front-engine, front-wheel drive

Powertrain
- Engine: 252 cu in (4.1 L) Buick V6; 307 cu in (5.0 L) Oldsmobile V8; 350 cu in (5.7 L) Oldsmobile V8; 350 cu in (5.7 L) Oldsmobile diesel V8
- Transmission: 3-speed TH325 automatic 4-speed TH325-4L automatic

Dimensions
- Wheelbase: 114 in (2,896 mm)
- Length: 204 in (5,182 mm)
- Width: 79.9 in (2,029 mm)

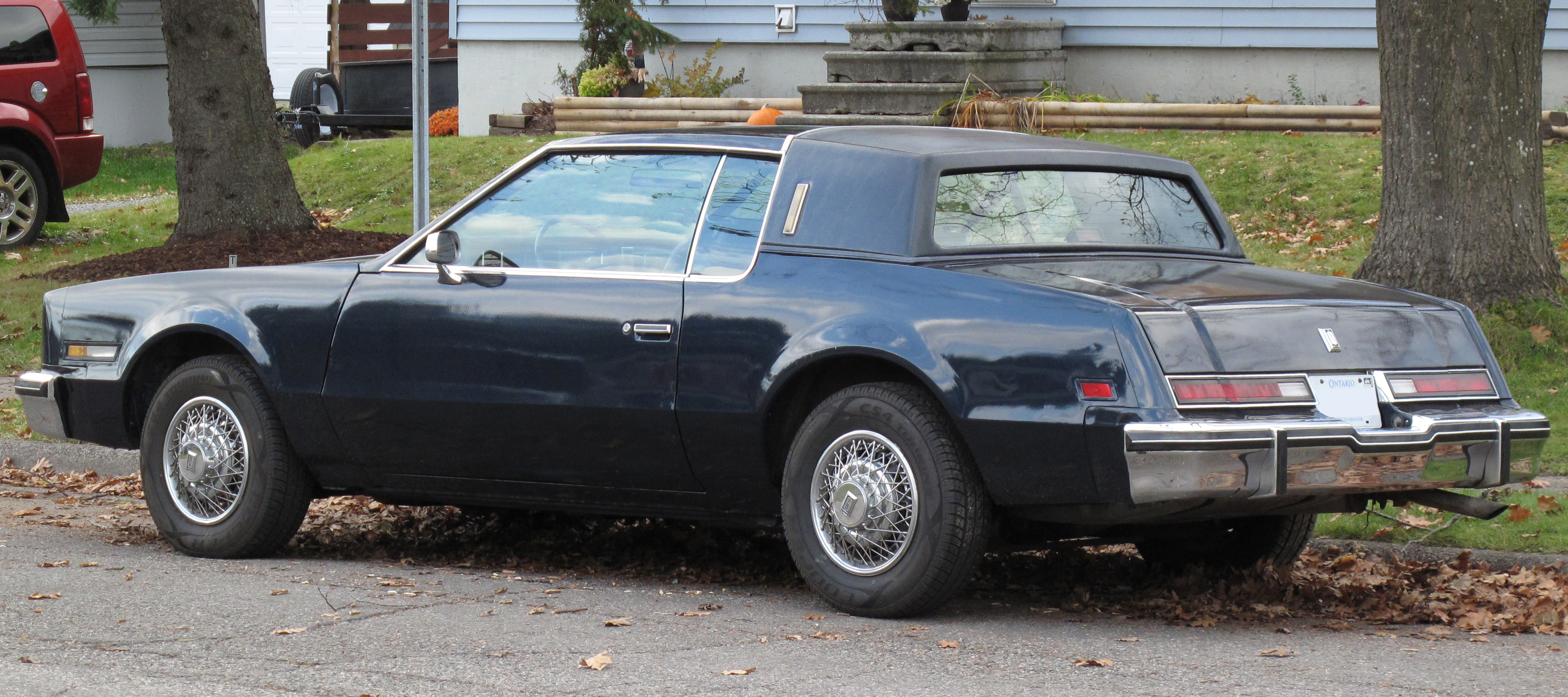
Rear view of a 1981 Oldsmobile Toronado

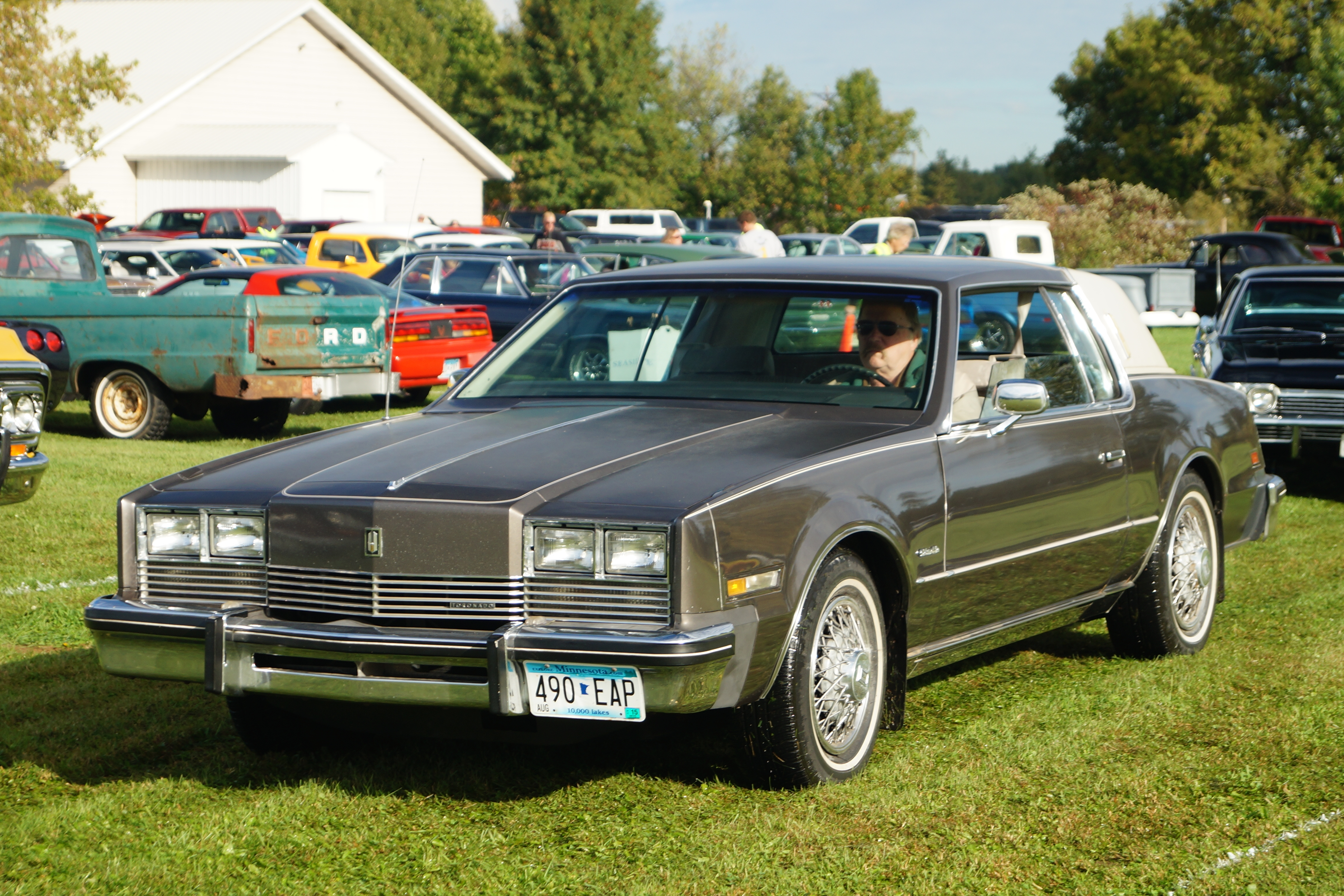
1983 Oldsmobile Toronado Brougham Coupe

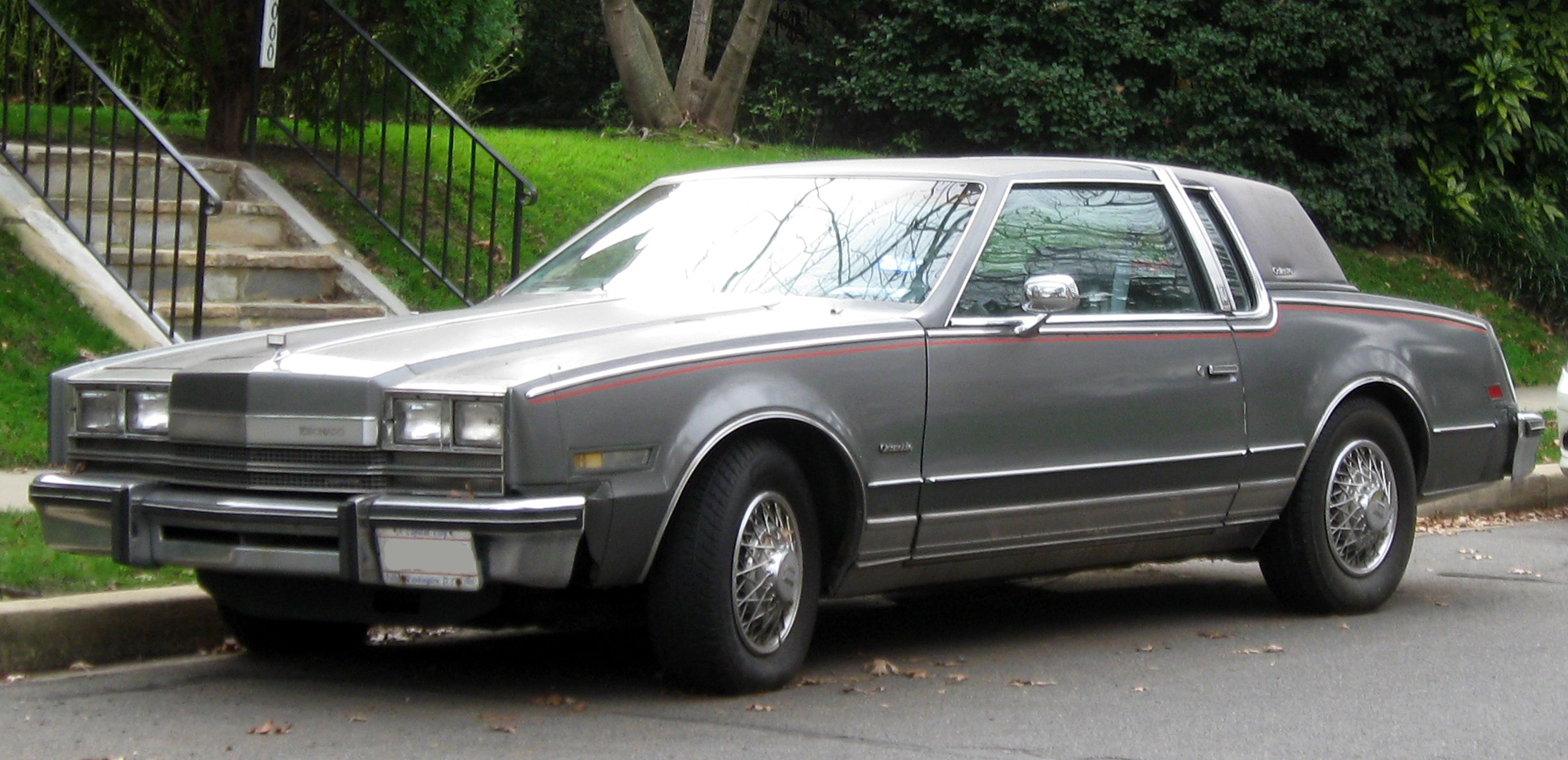
1985 Toronado Caliente, with a fixed opera window pillar

The third generation Toronado was substantially downsized, losing nearly 1,000 lb (450 kg) and almost 16 in (410 mm) in length. Reflecting its 206 in (5,200 mm) length and 114 in (2,900 mm) wheelbase, it came equipped with the smaller Oldsmobile 350 cu in (5.7 L) V8. The engine was rated at 170 HP/270 lb.ft. torque giving it a top speed of over 110 mph (175 km/h) and a 0–60 mph (0–97 km/h) acceleration time of 9.4 seconds.

A 307 cu in (5.03 L) V8 (140 HP) was introduced in 1980, and a larger 252 cu in (4.13 L) version of the Buick V6 (125 HP) shared with the Riviera was made available from 1981 to 1984, but it proved unpopular due to its slow acceleration.

Also offered in these years was Oldsmobile's new diesel V8, that is based on the division's gasoline-powered 350 cu in (5.7 L) V8, but with added block material. This engine was novel and economical, and sales were initially good. However, the diesel engine quickly acquired a terrible mechanical reputation, becoming a genuine black eye for Oldsmobile. Many cars which originally came diesel-equipped were eventually converted to gasoline engines when disgusted owners finally threw in the towel. The engine was revised through its life, which fixed many issues that hurt its reputation, but it was too late and the engine was eventually dropped.

The three-speed Turbo Hydra-Matic automatic transmission was standard equipment from 1979 to 1981 and replaced by the four-speed Turbo Hydra-Matic 325-4L overdrive unit from 1982 to 1985. The 307 cubic-inch V8 (a smaller-displacement version of the 350 Rocket), was standard on 1985 Toronados.

Independent rear suspension (designed by Cadillac engineers) was adopted for the new car, which helped to increase usable rear-seat and trunk space in the smaller body, as well as improved handling over previous Toronados with no sacrifice in ride quality. Rear disc brakes were optional.

In addition to the base Toronado Brougham, various trim packages were available under the XSC (1980–81) and Caliente (1984–85) names were offered along with choices of velour, leather upholstery, even sueded leather inserts and digital instrumentation. The XSC offered individual front bucket seats, as opposed to the traditional split bench front seat usually installed. The third-generation of the Toronado was also made into a convertible by the American Sunroof Company, with a power-operated cloth top. Reclining backrests were an option.

This generation Toronado, along with its Riviera and Eldorado cousins, were the last body-on-frame, front wheel drive cars with longitudinally mounted V8 engines.

== Fourth generation (1986–1992) ==
Fourth generation
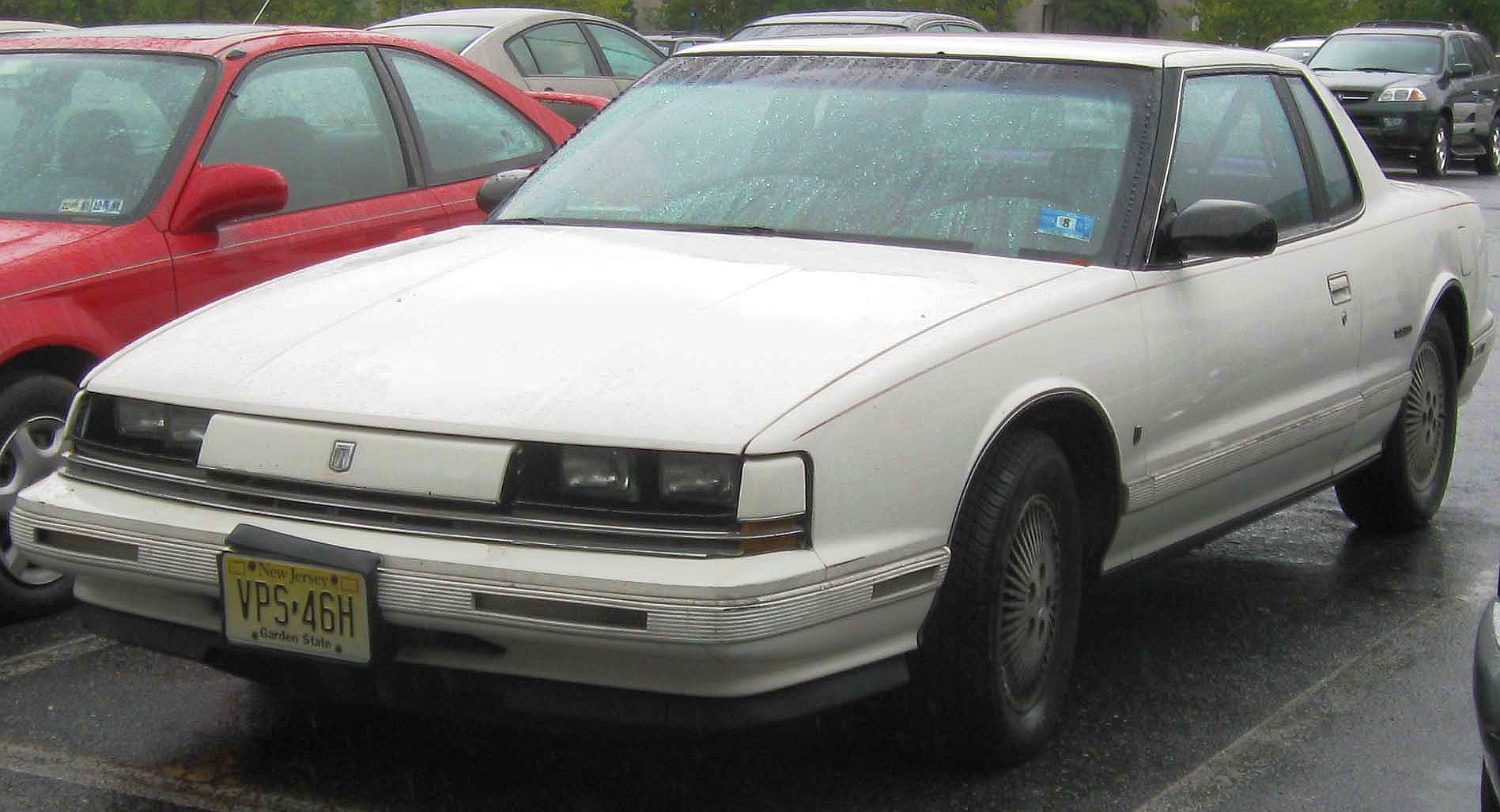
- 1990-1992 Oldsmobile Toronado

Overview
- Production: 1985–1992
- Model years: 1986–1992
- Assembly: United States: Detroit, Michigan (Detroit/Hamtramck Assembly)

Powertrain
- Engine: 231 cu in (3.8 L) Buick V6; 3.8 L Buick 3800 V6
- Transmission: 4-speed 4T60 automatic 4-speed 4T60-E automatic

Dimensions
- Wheelbase: 108 in (2,743 mm)
- Length: 1990–1992: 200.3 in (5,088 mm); 1986–89: 187.5 in (4,762 mm)
- Width: 1989–1992: 72.8 in (1,849 mm); 1986–88: 70.8 in (1,798 mm)
- Height: 1989–1992: 53.3 in (1,354 mm); 1986–88: 53 in (1,346 mm)

With a nearly 16% price increase over the 1985 model, the final generation Toronado made its debut in 1985 for the 1986 model year. It was smaller overall, moved from body-on-frame to unibody construction, and was the first Toronado since 1969 to feature hidden headlights. The Toronado's previous longitudinally-mounted V8 engines were superseded by a single, transversely-mounted fuel-injected version of the Buick 231 cu in (3.8 L) V6.

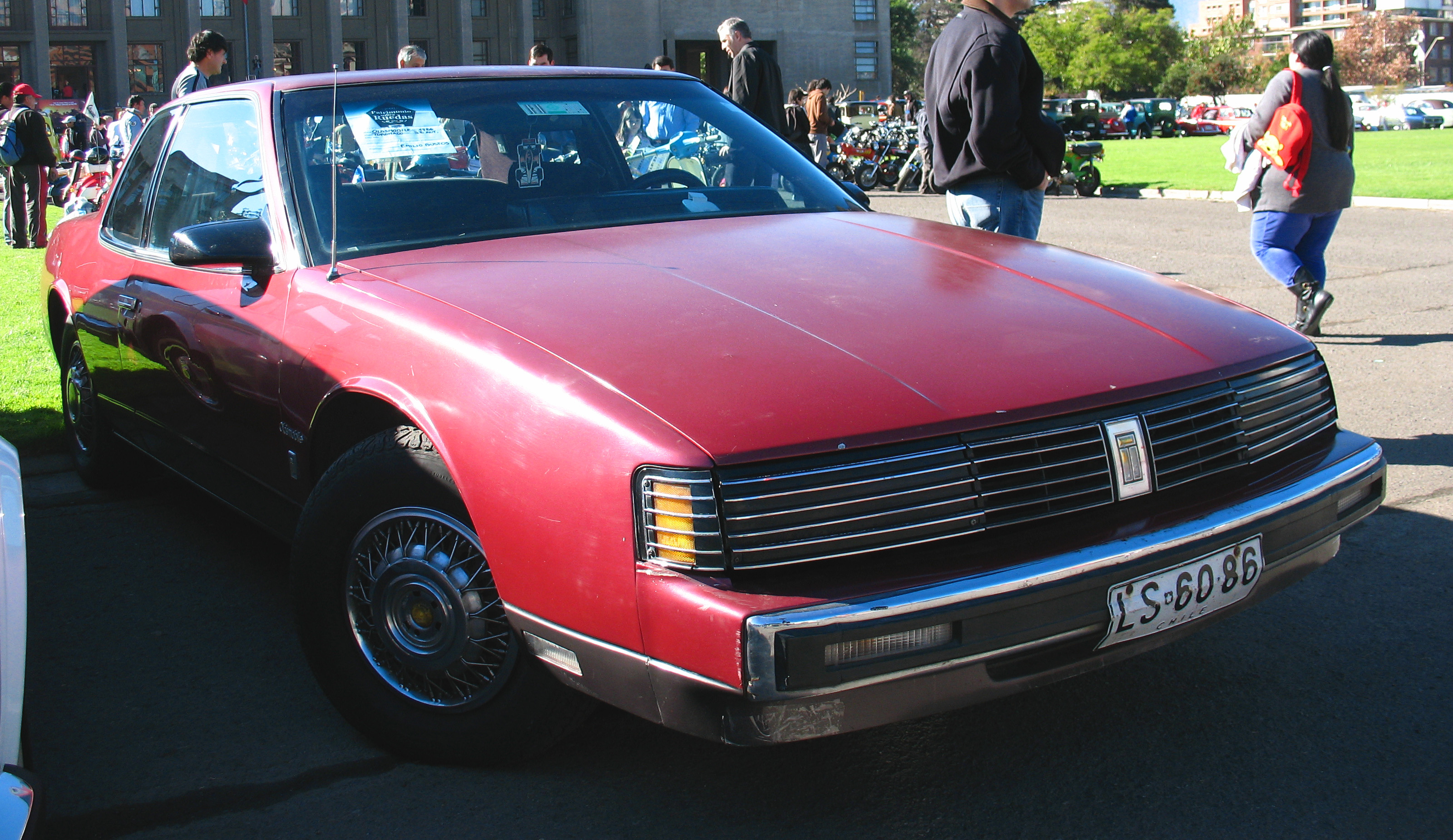
1986-1989 Oldsmobile Toronado

Inside, a new digital instrument panel and optional voice alert system were used. Standard seating was a cloth 60/40 bench with center armrest. Optional bucket seats were offered with a full-length center console and a horseshoe-like "basket handle" gear shift. Upholstery choices included cloth or leather.

Against predictions of sharp gasoline prices, prices fell dramatically. As a result, many traditional domestic car buyers chose to buy larger, less efficient cars in 1986. Along with its rebadged variants, the Eldorado and Riviera, the Toronado suffered a serious sales decline. Journalists cited factors including the downsizing, notable price increases, as well as styling that too closely followed less expensive, less-luxurious compacts at GM, notably the N-body Oldsmobile Calais, Buick Somerset, and Pontiac Grand Am.

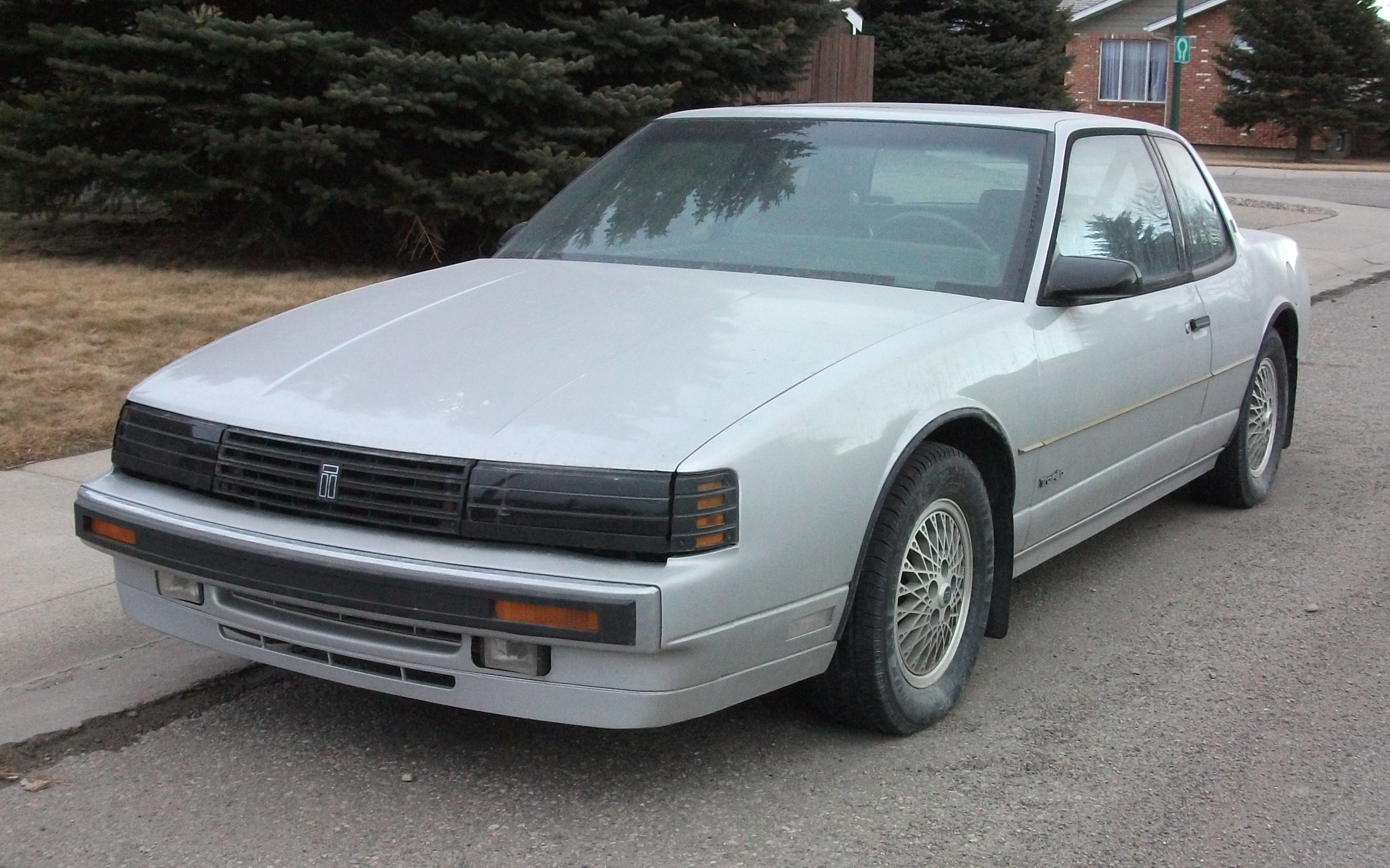
1987-1988 Oldsmobile Toronado Troféo

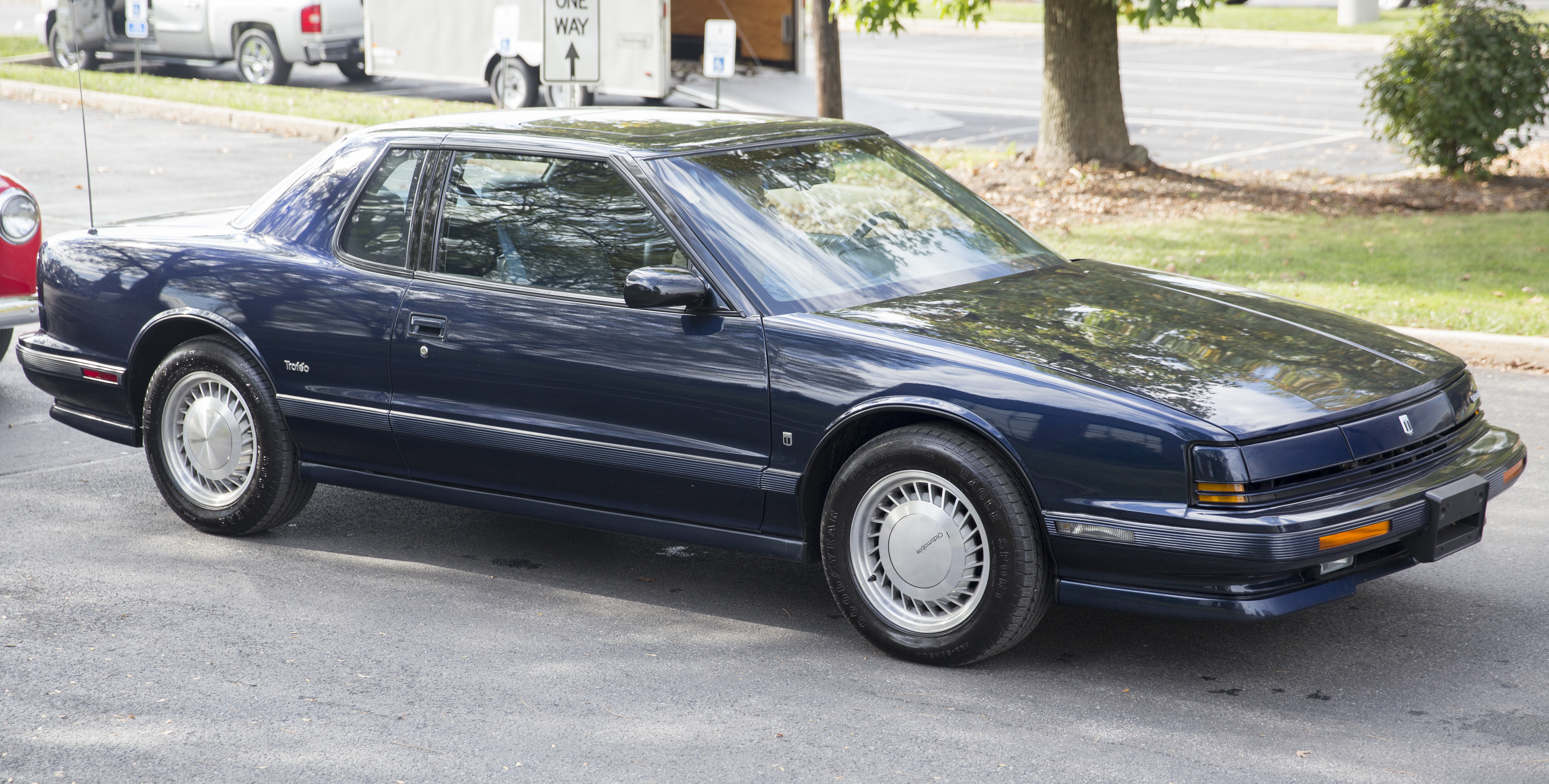
1990 Oldsmobile Toronado Troféo

In mid-1987, Oldsmobile attempted to bolster declining Toronado sales by introducing a sportier model marketed as the Toronado Troféo, which featured standard leather bucket seats, faux dual exhaust, more-aggressive styling, and a stiffer suspension (the corporate FE3 package, with retuned shocks, struts and other components).

For 1988, changes for the Troféo included new seats and monochromatic paint; both Toronado and Troféo used larger climate control buttons and rear three-point seatbelts. Additionally, power increased with the introduction of the new Buick 231 cu in (3.8 L) LN3 V6 engine. Optional wire wheel covers were no longer offered. Toronado and Trofeo models included the FE3 suspension with standard aluminum wheels.

For the 1989 model year, the Troféo was no longer marketed as the Toronado. Options included the Visual Information Center: a dash-mounted touchscreen CRT that controlled the vehicle's HVAC system, radio, trip computer and interface to the optional integrated hands-free cell phone. The Troféo also received standard anti-lock brakes, a new steering wheel with controls for radio and climate control, and standard bucket seats with console or an optional split-bench.

For 1990, the hood was the only carryover sheet metal as Oldsmobile designers redesigned the body, increasing the overall length by about 12 in (305 mm), enlarging the trunk. A driver-side airbag was standard equipment. The 1991 models had increased horsepower, and remote keyless entry and anti-lock brakes were now standard. Ultrasuede upholstery was an option. The optional moonroof no longer required ordering bucket seats, however, a fully digital instrument cluster was now only available on Toronado models equipped with a front bench seat.

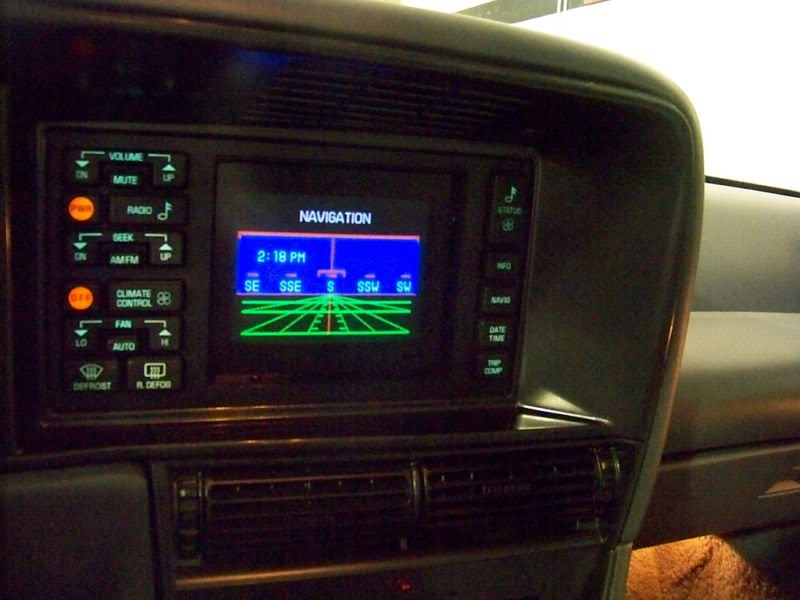
Oldsmobile CRT

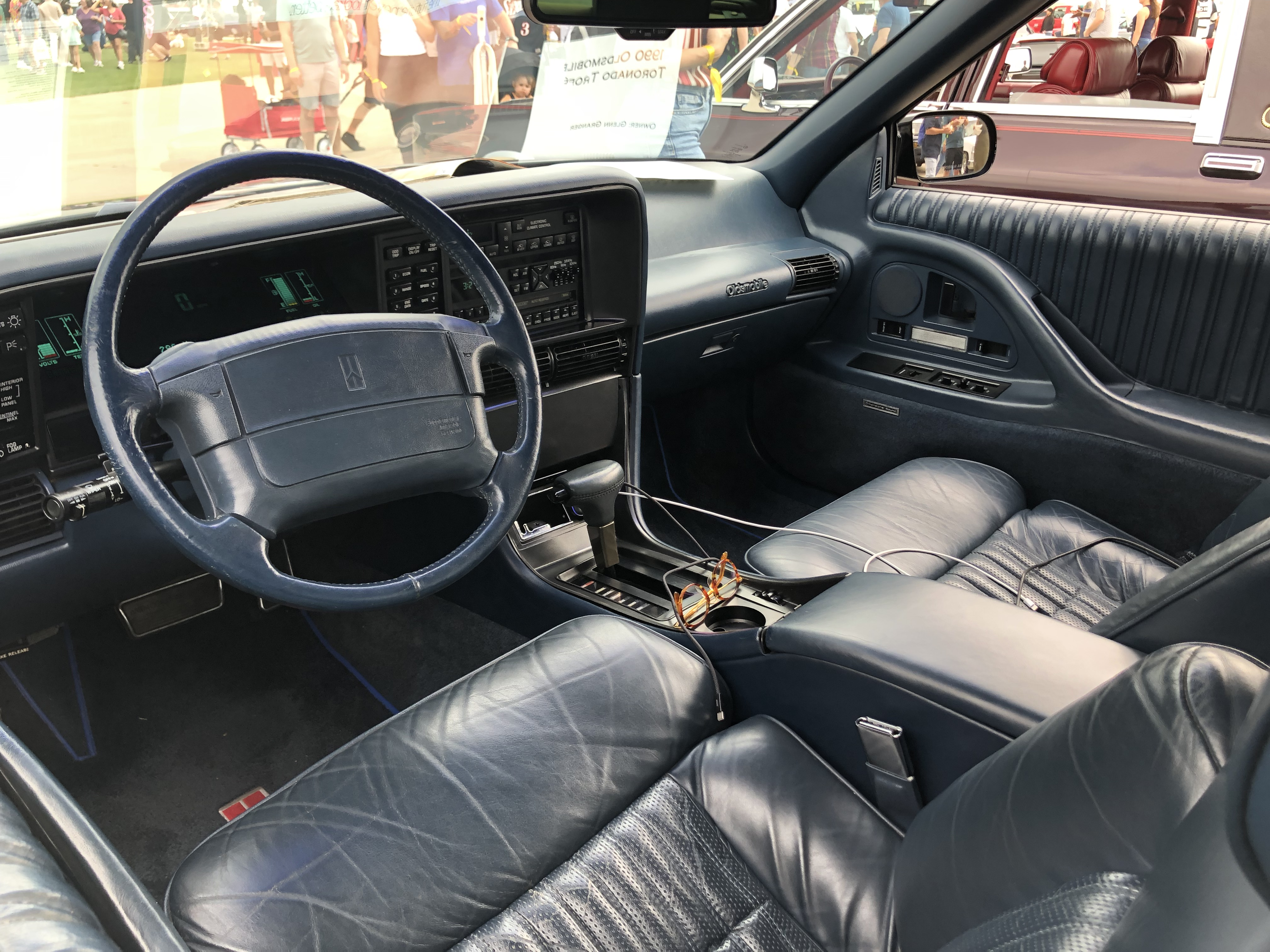
Oldsmobile Toronado Troféo interior

In 1992, General Motors (GM) and Avis Rent a Car pilot tested a GPS navigation system in select rental Troféo models equipped with the touchscreen at the Orlando International Airport in Florida. The pilot systems included the built-in cellular phone and a computer-synthesized voice guidance system. Named "TravTek", the system was monitored by AAA via an antenna mounted on the car's trunk, and included directions to AAA locations around the Orlando area.

1992 models again offered optional wire wheels and received a stiffer standard suspension, the formerly-optional FE3 package. Oldsmobile discontinued the Toronado and Troféo at the end of the 1992 model year, with the last Toronado rolling off the assembly line on May 28, 1992. The Toronado was ultimately replaced in the lineup in early 1994 by the Aurora sports sedan, which made its debut as a 1995 model and shared its platform with the eighth and final generation of the Buick Riviera.

== Variants ==
=== Jetway 707 ===
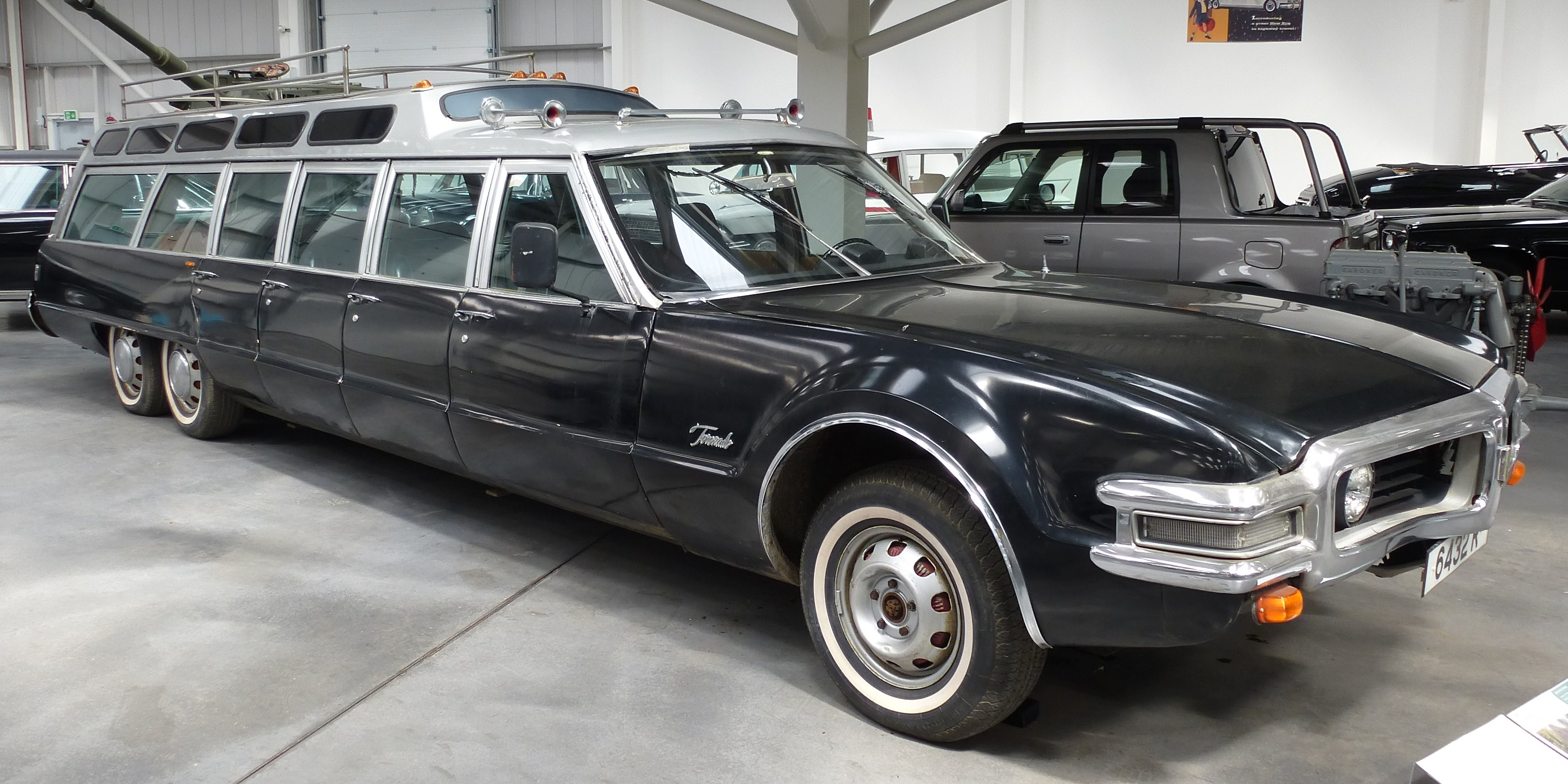
An AQC Jetway 707

During the late 1960s (1968–1970), the only Oldsmobile professionally made into a limousine was the Toronado, known as the American Quality Coach (AQC) Jetway 707, with the 707 moniker a nod to the Boeing 707. The 707 rode on six wheels, and was 28 ft long with a 185-inch wheelbase. To capitalize on the aircraft theme, the passengers each sat on individual bucket seats. Between 52 and 150 were believed to have been built. A black one can be seen in a traffic scene in the 1976 film All the President’s Men, a white one can be seen parked in the 1977 film Billy Jack Goes To Washington, and a gray convertible version can be seen in the 1978 film Sgt. Pepper's Lonely Hearts Club Band as one of the main vehicles.

=== 67 X ===
The 67 X (also Toronado 67X, Esso 67X) is a Canadian-built automobile, based on the Toronado, that was designed and manufactured by automobile customizer George Barris for Canada's Expo 67, where they were raffled off in a contest sponsored by Esso. Only four of these vehicles were ever made, and they included swiveling seats, a sofa, and even a refrigeration unit. Commercials for the car were aired in the Stanley Cup Playoffs final game between the Montreal Canadiens and Toronto Maple Leafs. In April 2009, a 67 X came up for auction on eBay.
