= Safar (disambiguation) =

Safar is the second month of Islamic calendar.

Safar may also refer to:

== Human names ==
- Safar (surname), a surname of multiple etymologies
- Safar (given name), a given name found in Azerbaijan and Iranian Azerbaijan
- Šafář, a surname found in Czech Republic
- Sáfár, a surname found in Hungary

== Entertainment ==
- Safar (1970 film), a 1970 Indian Hindi-language film by Asit Sen
- Safar (2016 film), a 2016 Nepali film
- "Safar", a song by Vishal Mishra and Mohit Chauhan from the 2019 Indian film Notebook

== Places ==
- Safar (neighborhood), a neighborhood in Alexandria, Egypt
- Safar, Iran, a village in Jayezan Rural District, Khuzestan Province

== See also ==
- Safari (disambiguation)
- Saffar (disambiguation)
- Sfar (disambiguation)
- Musafir (disambiguation)
- Humsafar (disambiguation)
