= Safari (disambiguation) =

A safari is an overland journey.

Safari may also refer to:

== Zoological parks ==
- Safari park, a drive-through animal park
- Karachi Safari Park, a children's park in Pakistan
- Ramat Gan Safari, a zoo in Israel

== Computing ==
- Safari (web browser), a web browser developed by Apple Inc.
- SAFARI, a proposed French government database of personal data
- SimSafari, a 1998 computer game

== Drinks ==
- Safari, another name for Yop, a yoghurt drink
- Orange Safari, a cocktail

== Music ==
- The Safaris, an American pop group
- Safari (Gnags album)
- Safari (Jovanotti album)
- Safari, by Victoria Kimani
- Safari (EP), by The Breeders
- Safari (Miranda! album), 2014
- "Safari" (J Balvin song), 2016
- "Safari" (Tyler, The Creator song), 2021

== Vehicles ==
- GMC Safari, a van
- Pontiac Safari, a station wagon
- Citroën Safari, a version of the Citroën DS
- Tata Safari, an SUV
- Saab Safari, an aircraft
- Safari Helicopter a kit helicopter

== Media ==
=== Books and magazines ===
- Safari (novel), a series of books by Ahmed Khaled Towfik
- Safari Books Online, an online service
- Safari magazine, an Indian scientific magazine

=== Film and cinema ===
- Safari (1940 film), an American film from 1940 with Douglas Fairbanks Jr. and Madeleine Carroll
- Northern Safari (1956 film), an Australian documentary film directed by Keith Adams
- Safari (1956 film), a British film from 1956 with Victor Mature and Janet Leigh
- Safari (1991 film), a French TV film directed by Roger Vadim
- Safari (1999 film), a Bollywood film directed by Jyotin Goel
- Safari (2016 film), a documentary film directed by Ulrich Seidl
- Safari Cinema, a former cinema in Croydon, London

=== Television ===
- Safari TV, a Malayalam language travel television channel

== Other ==
- African Safari Airways, a Kenyan airline company
- Air Safaris, a British airline company
- SAFARI-1, a South African nuclear research reactor
- Safari Club, an alliance of intelligence services formed in 1976 that ran covert operations around Africa
- Behrang Safari (born 1985), Swedish footballer
- HMS Safari (P211), a British S-class submarine
- Mahal Safari, an alternate spelling of Mehal Sefari, an elite Ethiopian military unit
- Safari Kimanzi (born 1994), Kenyan boy who received surgery in Australia due to severe burns
- Safari Rally, a rallying competition in Kenya
- Safari Sevens, a Kenyan rugby sevens tournament
- A tradename for dinotefuran, a neonicotinoid insecticide
- Royal Safari, a bus company in Indonesia
- Safari Dharma Raya, an Indonesian bus transport company

== See also ==
- Safari jacket, a type of clothing
- The Surfaris, an American surf rock band
- Safar (disambiguation)
