= Saffar =

Saffar may refer to:

- Saffar (surname), arabic surname
- Saffar (planet), an exo-planet

== See also ==
- Battle of Marj al-Saffar
- Safar (disambiguation)
