= Sfar =

Sfar may refer to:

- Abdelaziz Sfar (1939-2012), Tunisian handball player, teacher and leader
- Béchir Sfar (1856-2017), Tunisian nationalist campaigner and politician
- El Sfar Mosque, former Tunisian mosque
- Fatma Sfar-Ben-Chker (born 1994), Tunisian handball player
- Joann Sfar (born 1971), French comics artist, comic book creator and film director
- Rachid Sfar (born 1933), Tunisian Prime Minister under Habib Bourguiba
- Selima Sfar (born 1977), Tunisian tennis player
- Sfäär, a restaurant in Tallinn, Estonia
- Tahar Sfar (1903-1942), Tunisian lawyer and politician
