= Chevrolet Nomad =

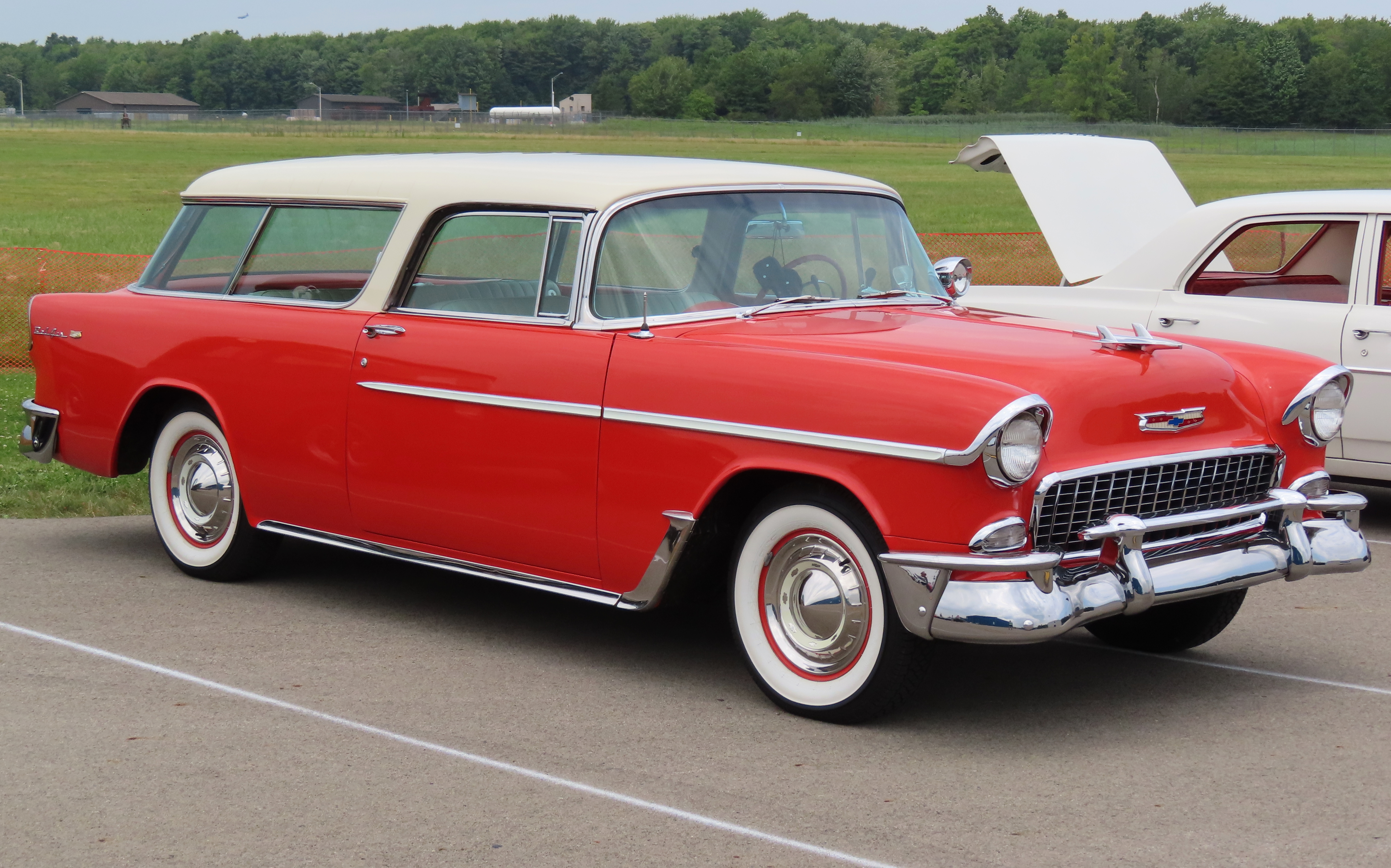
- 1955 Chevrolet Bel Air Nomad

Overview
- Manufacturer: Chevrolet (General Motors)
- Production: 1955–1961; 1968–1972

Body and chassis
- Layout: FR layout

Chevrolet Nomad was a nameplate used by Chevrolet in North America from the 1950s to the 1970s, applied largely to station wagons. Three different Nomads were produced as a distinct model line, with Chevrolet subsequently using the name as a trim package.

Marketed as a halo model of the Chevrolet station wagon line for the Tri-Five series, the Nomad was repackaged as a station wagon counterpart of the Chevrolet Bel Air and Chevrolet Impala from 1958 to 1961. From 1968 to 1972, the Nomad returned as the base-trim Chevrolet Chevelle station wagon.

Making its debut on a 1954 concept car, the nameplate has again seen used by Chevrolet on multiple concept vehicles; none have reached production.

== Development ==
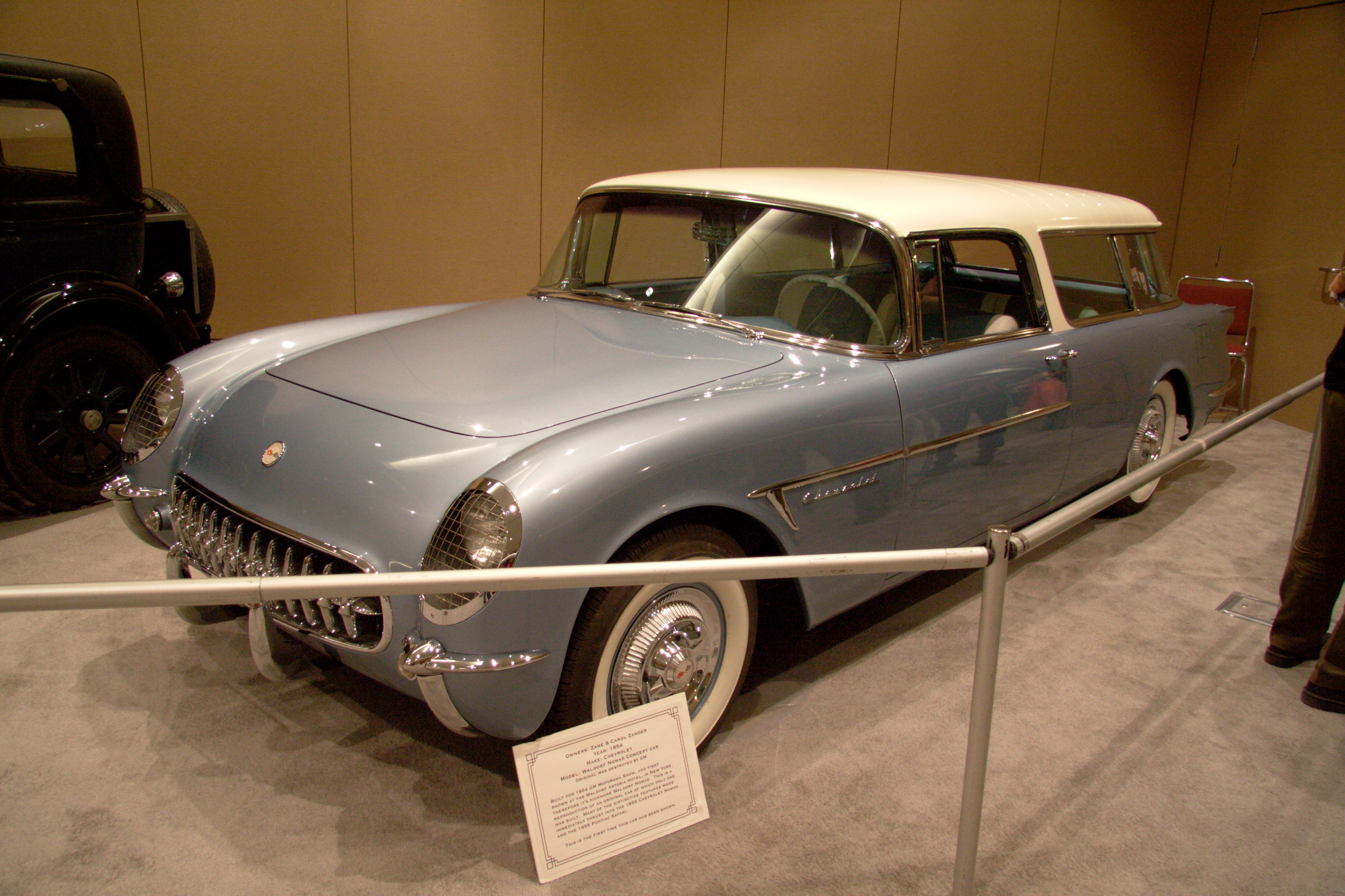
Reproduction of the 1954 Chevrolet Nomad Concept

The Chevrolet Nomad was introduced in 1954 as part of the General Motors Motorama line of "dream cars" developed by GM head stylist Harley Earl. As a follow-up to the Chevrolet Corvette roadster and Chevrolet (Corvette) Corvair fastback of the year before, the Nomad was a "dream car" alongside the Pontiac Bonneville Special and Oldsmobile F-88; the latter two were experimental prototypes built on Corvette chassis.

Adopting the front fascia of the Corvette to a two-door wagon body, the Nomad shifted away from the utilitarian design of traditional station wagons, introducing a forward-slanting B-pillar and nearly wraparound rear windows.

Following a positive response to the Motorama design, GM approved the Nomad for 1955 production. As a prerequisite for approval, the design was to be adapted to the standard A-body Chevrolet chassis, both larger and more widely produced than the Corvette. The use of the A-body also allowed GM to produce the vehicle as a Pontiac.

While it is believed that GM ultimately destroyed the concept vehicle (as was common practice of the time), several reproductions of the Nomad concept exist, mating Corvette front fascias to production Nomad bodies.

== Tri-Five (1955–1957) ==
First generation (Tri-Five)
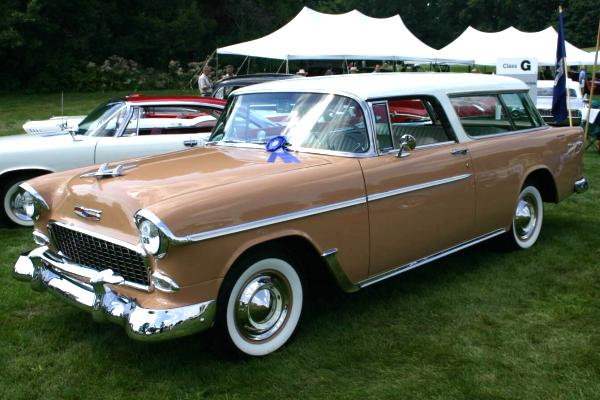
- 1955 Chevrolet Bel Air Nomad

Overview
- Production: 1955–1957
- Assembly: United States: Baltimore, Maryland (Baltimore Assembly); Flint, Michigan (Flint Truck Assembly); Janesville, Wisconsin (Janesville Assembly); Lakewood Heights, Georgia (Lakewood Assembly); Leeds, Missouri (Leeds Assembly); North Tarrytown, New York (North Tarrytown Assembly); Norwood, Ohio (Norwood Assembly); St. Louis, Missouri (St. Louis Truck Assembly); Van Nuys, California (Van Nuys Assembly)

Body and chassis
- Body style: 2-door station wagon
- Platform: A-body
- Related: Pontiac Safari

Powertrain
- Engine: 265 cu in (4.3 L) V8; 283 cu in (4.6 L) V8

Dimensions
- Wheelbase: 115 in (2,921.0 mm)
- Length: 201 in (5,105.4 mm)

Sharing its roofline design nearly intact from the 1954 Motorama "dream car", the first version of the Chevrolet Nomad was produced as a two-door "sport wagon". While considered a distinct model line, the Nomad was trimmed in line with the Bel Air sedan, along with its badging.

The production Nomad was the Chevrolet counterpart of the Pontiac Safari; while the two vehicles shared an identical chassis and roofline, the Safari shared its front fascia with the Pontiac Chieftain and interior trim with the Pontiac Star Chief (its sedan counterpart).

=== 1955 ===
Priced at $2571, the Nomad was among the most expensive 1955 Chevrolets (excluding the Corvette); the model line received a 265 cubic-inch V8 as standard equipment. While the Nomad received Bel Air fender badging, to emphasize its roofline, the Nomad only shared the front fender trim and door trim with the Bel Air. In contrast with other Chevrolets, the Nomad was designed with fully radiused rear wheel openings (a design feature of the Corvette). Coinciding with the design of its roofline, the Nomad shared its front doors with the Bel Air hardtop and convertible (using frameless door glass).

As with the four-door Beauville station wagon, the Nomad received interior trim similar to the Bel Air sedan; the model line was the only two-door Chevrolet wagon fitted with interior carpeting and cloth seats. Though distinguished by its forward-sloping rear window, tailgate, and B-pillar, the Nomad included a two-piece split tailgate and flat-folding rear seat.

=== 1956 ===
Sharing the same front fascia update as other 1956 Chevrolets, the exterior of the Nomad also adopted a unique variation of the revised side-panel trim of the Bel Air, with the upward facing piece skewed slightly forward to align with the B-pillar; on all other '56 Bel Airs, this piece skewed slightly rearward. Again called both a Nomad and a Bel Air Nomad interchangeably, the model line received a standard two-tone exterior and interior. The fully-radiused rear wheel openings were dropped for the Nomad; all non-Corvette Chevrolets received a larger rear-wheel cutout.

For 1956, Ford introduced the Ford Parklane as a direct competitor of the Nomad. While the Parklane would outsell the Nomad by nearly two-to-one for 1956, Ford discontinued the model line after a single model year.

=== 1957 ===
The 1957 Nomad adopted the same overall update as other 1957 Chevrolets, including a redesign of the front fascia and dashboard; large tailfins added several inches to the length of the vehicle. While two-tone options remained for the interior, exterior two-tone combinations became more subdued, shifting back to a contrasting roofline color.

Following continued low sales of the Nomad through the Tri-Five generation, Chevrolet discontinued the distinct model line after the 1957 model year. Pontiac also withdrew the two-door Safari wagon, with the division adopting the nameplate for nearly its entire range of station wagons.

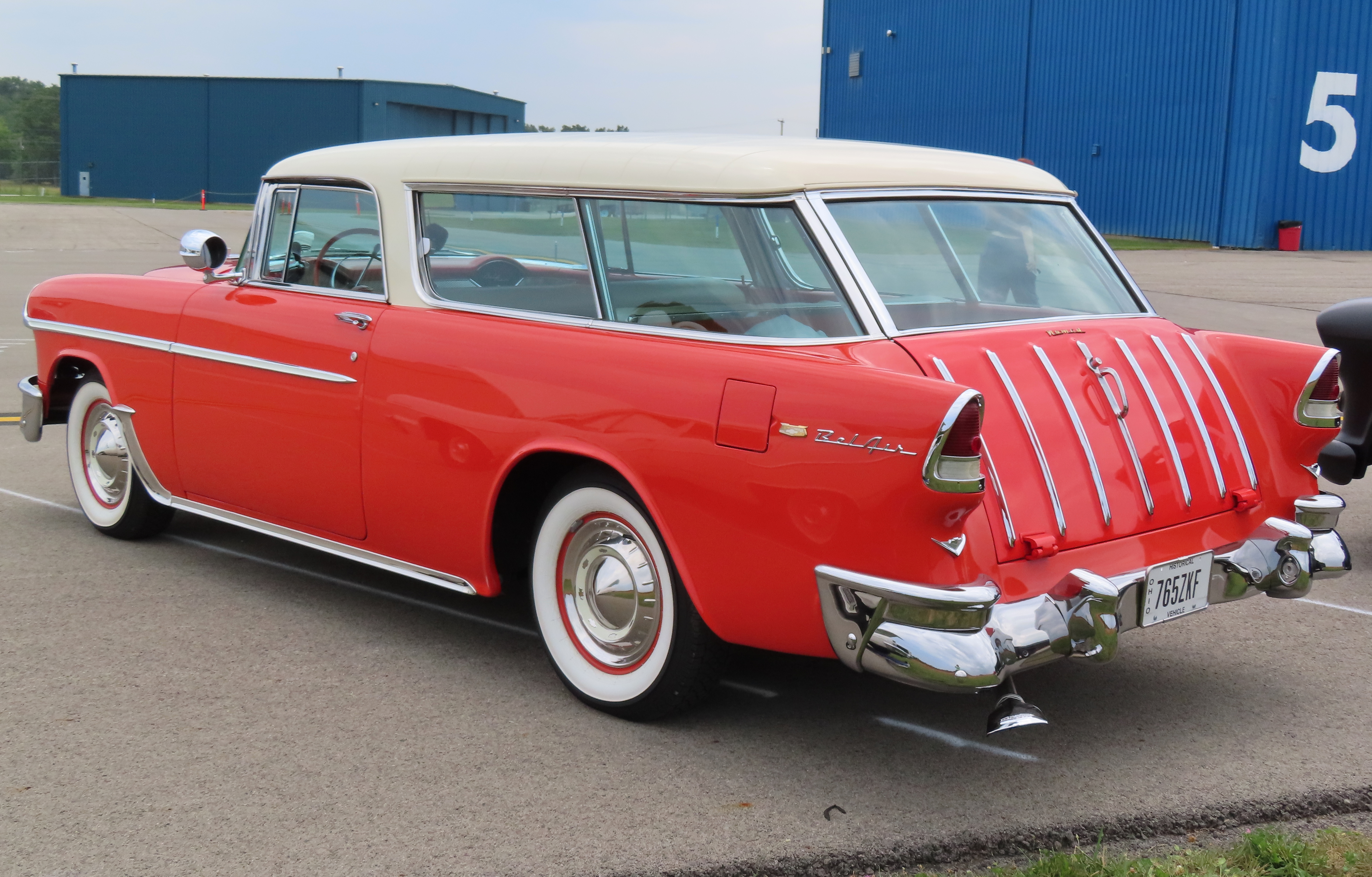
1955 Chevrolet Bel Air Nomad rear

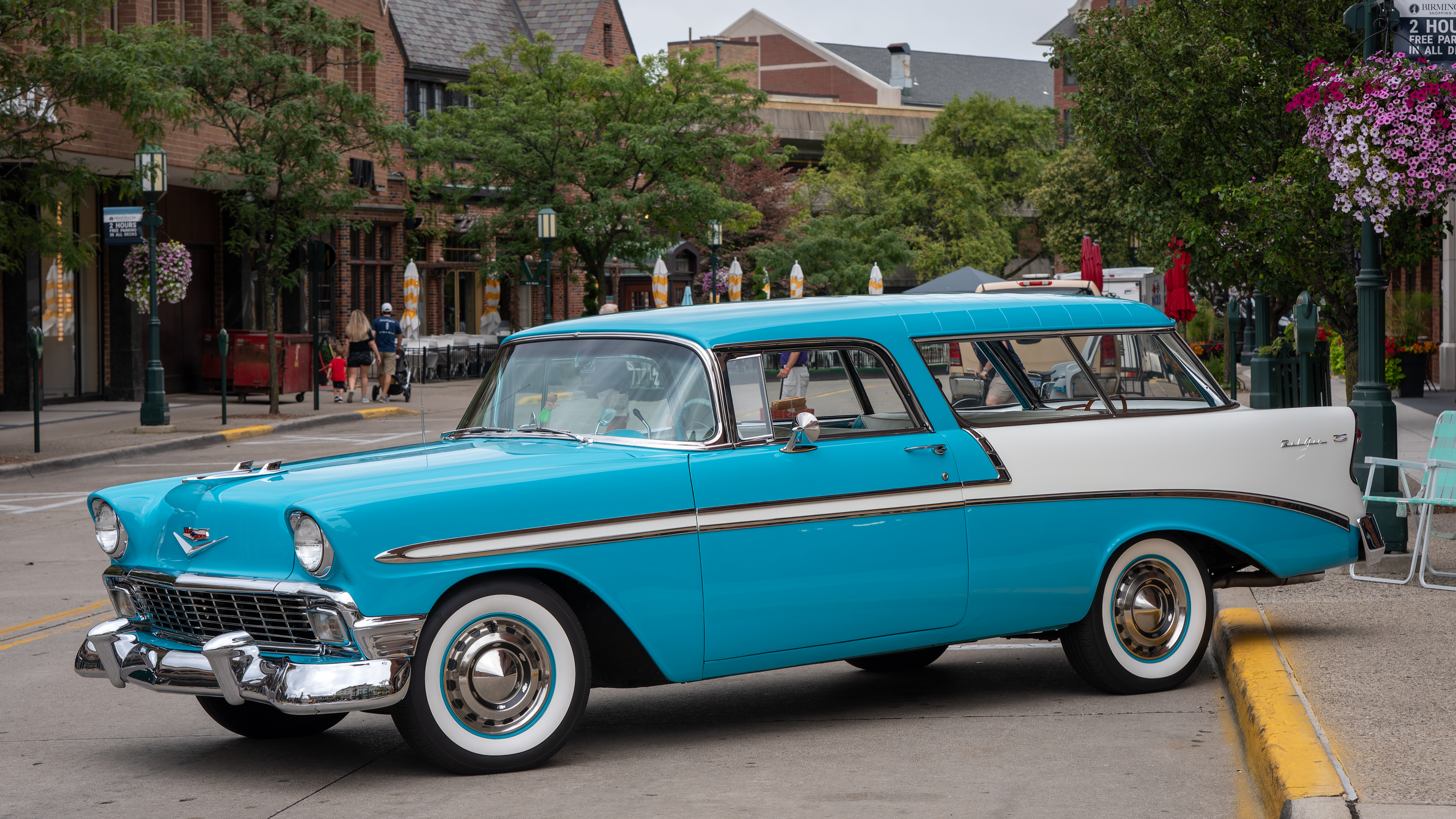
1956 Chevrolet Bel Air Nomad

1957 Chevrolet Bel Air Nomad

== Bel Air (1958–1961) ==
Second generation (Bel Air/Impala)
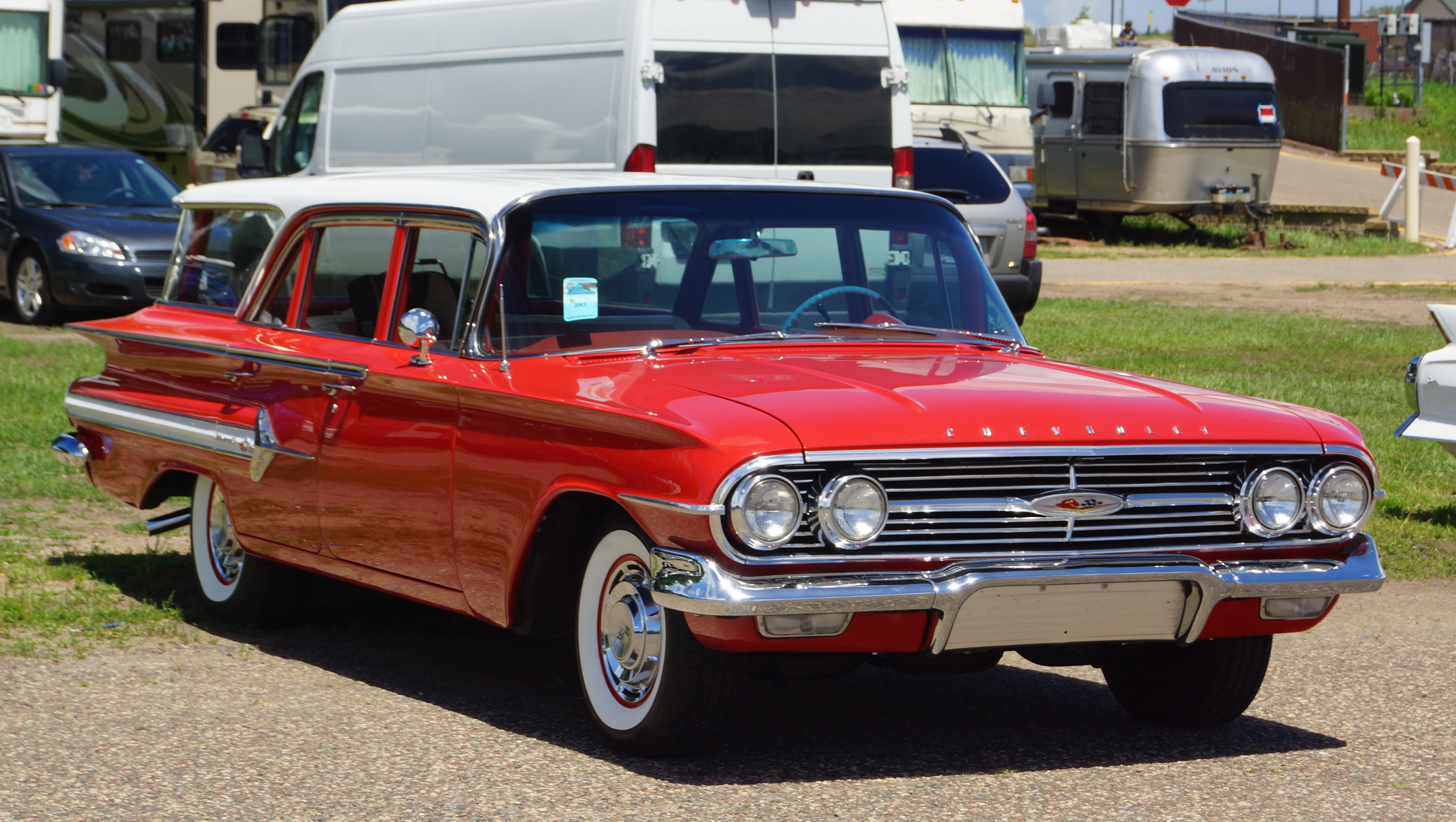
- 1960 Chevrolet Nomad

Overview
- Production: 1958–1961

Body and chassis
- Body style: 4-door station wagon
- Platform: B-body

Powertrain
- Engine: 235 cu in (3.9 L) I6; 283 cu in (4.6 L) V8; 348 cu in (5.7 L) V8; 409 cu in (6.7 L) V8

Dimensions
- Wheelbase: 119 in (3,023 mm)

As Chevrolet shifted from the A-body to the B-body for 1958, the division made station wagons a separate model range from sedans. While no longer a two-door sport wagon, the Nomad nameplate made its return, again denoting the flagship Chevrolet station wagon series.

=== 1958 ===
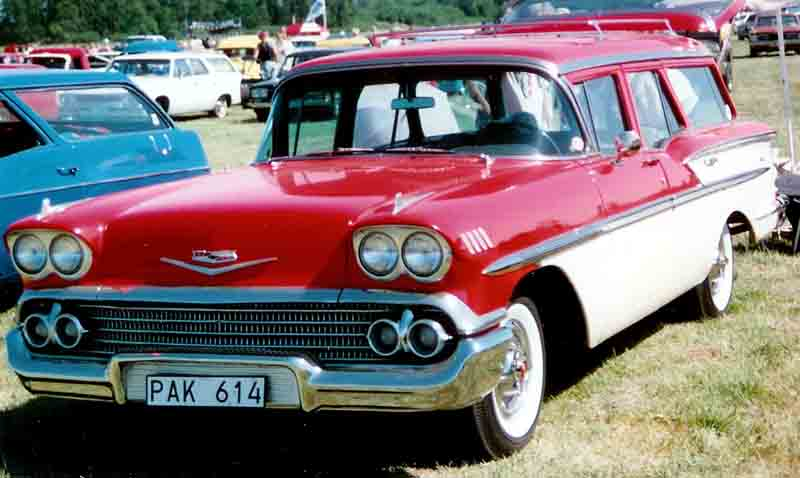
1958 Chevrolet Nomad

For the 1958 model year, Chevrolet adopted the Nomad nameplate for all Bel Air-trim station wagons, slotted above the Brookwood (Biscayne) and the Yeoman (Delray).

While all four-door Chevrolet wagons shared a common body, the B-body Nomad carried over several styling features from its Tri-Five predecessor, including chrome tailgate trim, multi-tone exterior and interiors, and a forward-sloping C-pillar (in place of the previous B-pillar).

The Nomad was offered in a 6-passenger configuration, with the Brookwood as the sole 9-passenger Chevrolet station wagon.

=== 1959–1960 ===
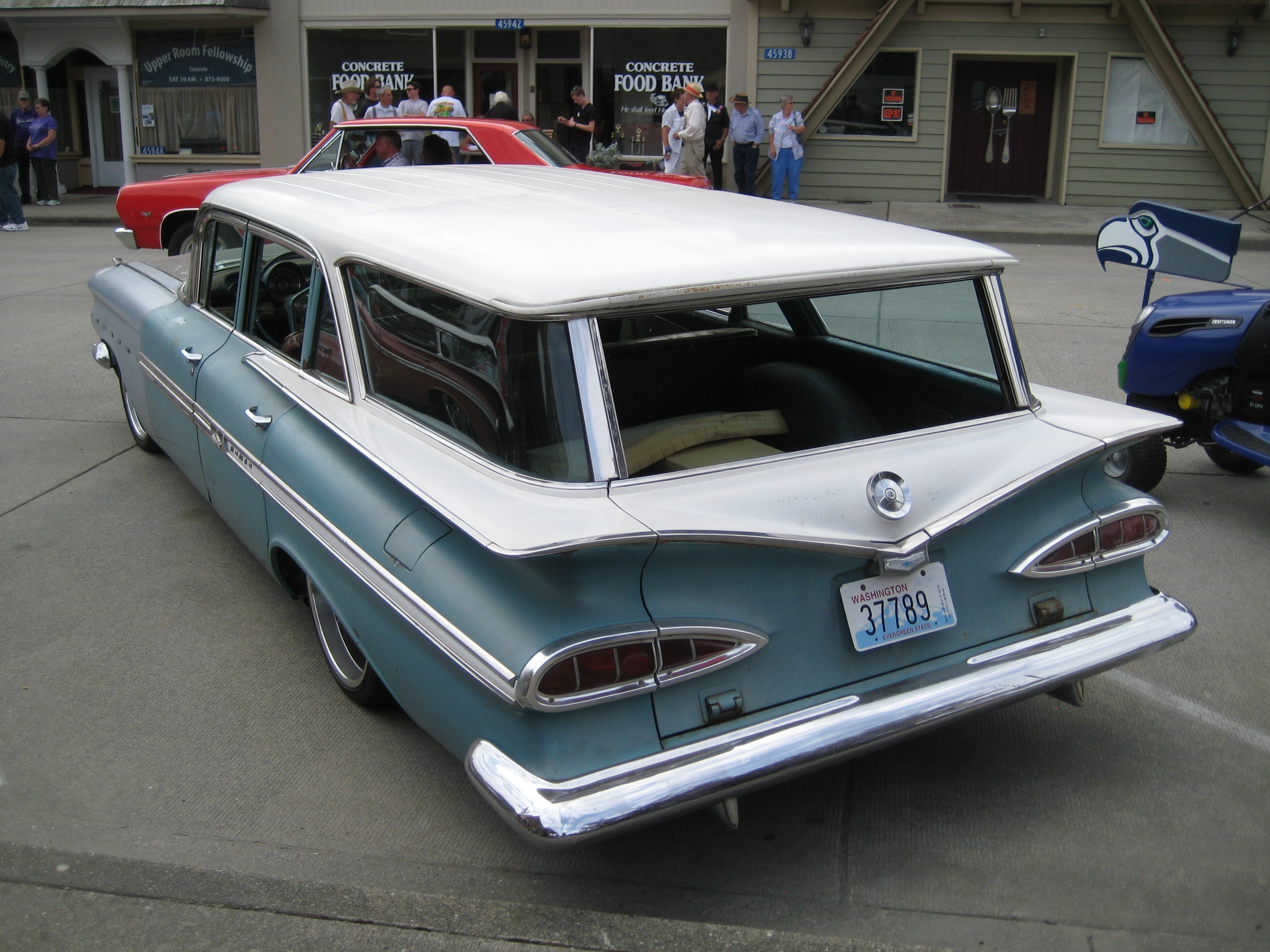
1959 Chevrolet Nomad rear view

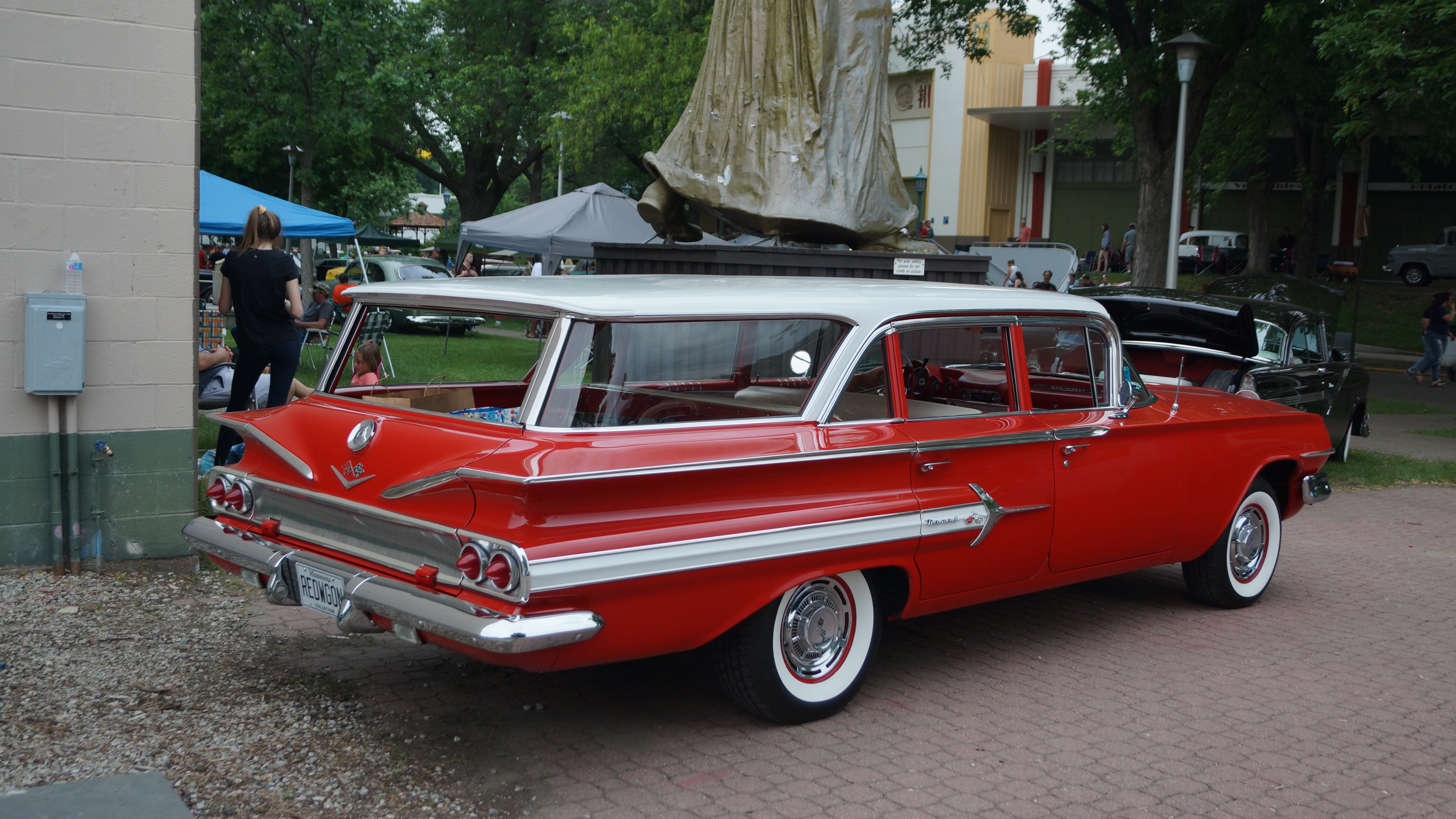
Rear view, 1960 Chevrolet Nomad

For 1959, Chevrolet again redesigned its full-size sedans and station wagons, with the Nomad becoming the counterpart of the newly introduced Chevrolet Impala range; Chevrolet introduced two new Bel Air wagons: the 9-passenger Kingswood and the 6-passenger Parkwood. The Yeoman was retired (following the discontinuation of the Delray), leaving the Biscayne-trim Brookwood as the lowest-trim Chevrolet wagon. The latter was offered in four-door and two-door bodies (the latter of which formed the basis of the inaugural El Camino).

In a design change, the split tailgate was replaced by a one-piece design with a retractable rear window. Closer in line to Chevrolet sedans, the Nomad adopted forward-curved C-pillars and large horizontal tailfins (replacing the vertical chrome tailgate strips). As with the Kingswood, an optional rear-facing third-row seat made the Nomad a 9-passenger vehicle.

For 1960, an exterior revision introduced more subdued styling. While the roofline was carried over, the front and rear fascias were redesigned, introducing a larger grille (to visually lower the hoodline), more conservative tailfins (updated primarily through trim changes) and taillamps; a chrome "jet" was added to the rear quarter panels.

=== 1961 ===
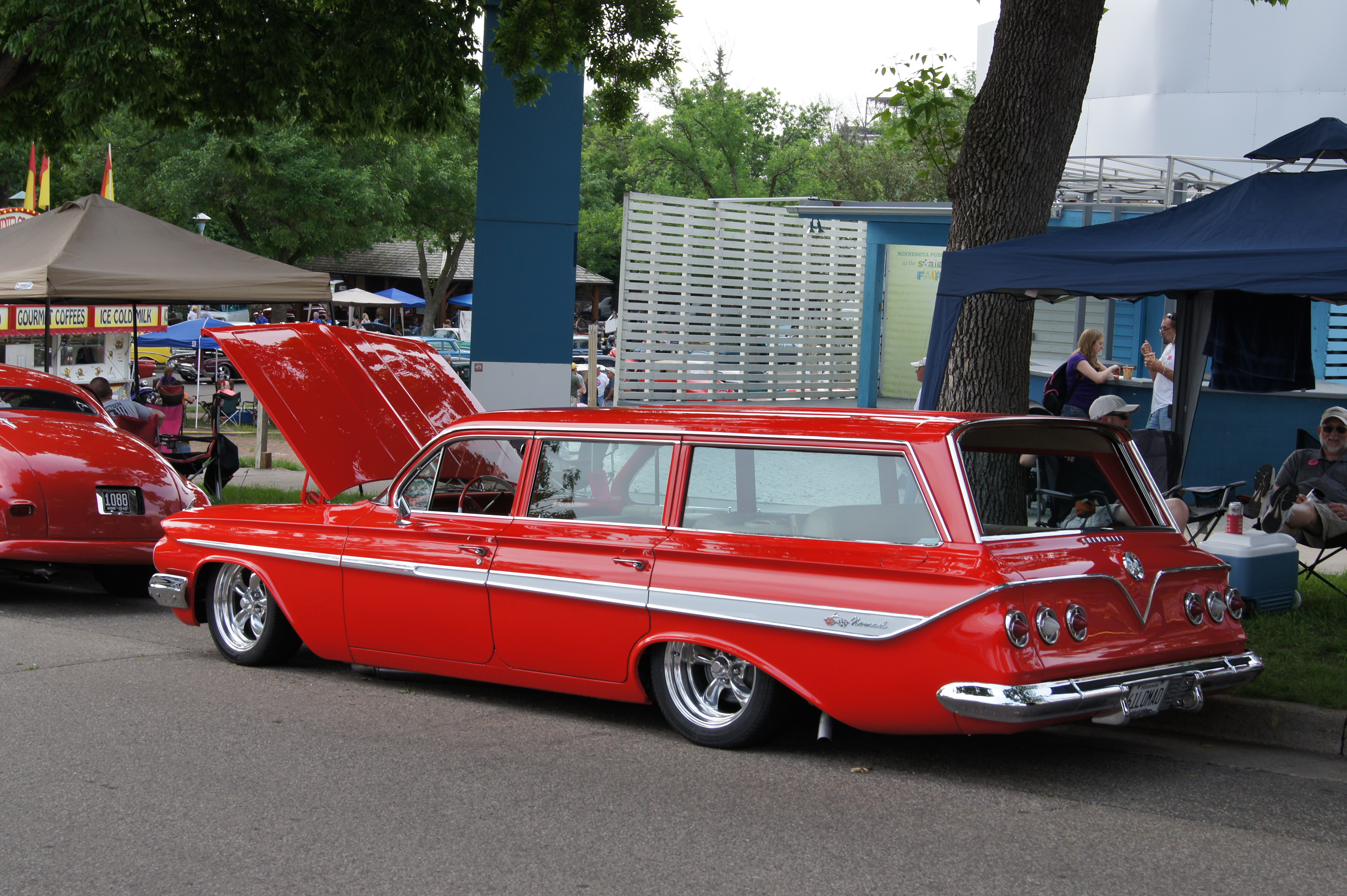
1961 Chevrolet Nomad (with aftermarket wheels)

For 1961, Chevrolet redesigned its full-size B-body range, including its station wagon series. Again based on a 119-inch wheelbase, the Nomad was slightly resized, losing two inches of body width and an inch of height.

Far more conservative in appearance than its 1959-1960 predecessor, the redesigned Nomad saw increased cargo space and functionality as the tailgate opening was enlarged. Again serving as the top-trim Chevrolet wagon, the Nomad was offered only with 9-passenger seating (as the Kingswood was discontinued).

For 1962, Chevrolet retired the Nomad nameplate, as the model was repackaged as the Impala station wagon.

== Chevelle (1968–1972) ==
Third generation (Chevelle)
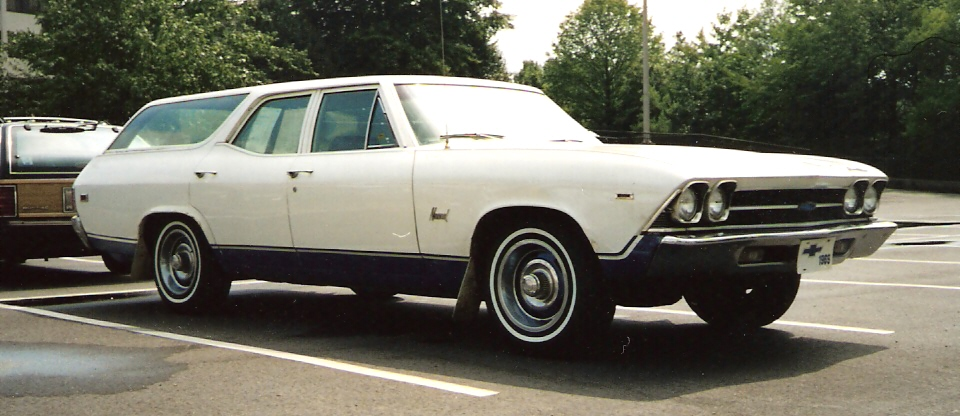
- 1969 Chevrolet Nomad

Overview
- Production: 1968–1972

Body and chassis
- Body style: 4-door station wagon
- Platform: GM A platform (RWD)

After a 6-year hiatus, Chevrolet revived the Nomad nameplate for the 1968 model year. Again denoting a station wagon, the Nomad was now part of the intermediate Chevrolet Chevelle model line, replacing the Chevelle 300 station wagon. In stark contrast to its two previous iterations, the 1968 Nomad served as the lowest-price Chevelle station wagon. Marketed strictly as a 6-passenger vehicle, the Nomad was not offered with a third-row seat, interval windshield wipers, or underfloor storage; it is also the only version sold with a six-cylinder engine.

For 1969, Chevrolet split station wagons into a distinct model line, with the Nomad dropping "Chevelle" from its nameplate. The reintroduced Greenbrier replaced the Nomad Custom, slotted below the Concours/Concours Estate series.

Through its production, the Chevelle-based Nomad saw few major functional changes. For 1970, the front fascia was redesigned (closer in line with larger Chevrolets). For 1971, the rear tailgate was replaced by a two-way design, with the front fascia adopting a two-headlight design. The 1972 model year was largely carryover (with the exception of a minor grille revision), serving as the final production of the Nomad station wagon.

For 1973, Chevrolet ended its practice of distinct nameplates for both full-size and intermediate station wagons. Alongside the introduction of the "Colonnade" series of GM intermediates, the lowest-trim Chevrolet station wagon was renamed the Chevelle Deluxe.

== Further use of name ==
Following its retirement from the Chevelle model line, Chevrolet continued the use of the Nomad name through the late 1970s, denoting variants of other model lines.

=== Chevrolet Vega Nomad (1976) ===
For 1976, Chevrolet created the Vega Nomad as an option for the Vega Kammback station wagon. Intended as an appearance package, the Vega Nomad received filler panels (to restyle the B-pillars), a vinyl roof, tailgate rub strips, and vinyl Nomad badging.

=== Chevrolet Van Nomad (1977–1981) ===
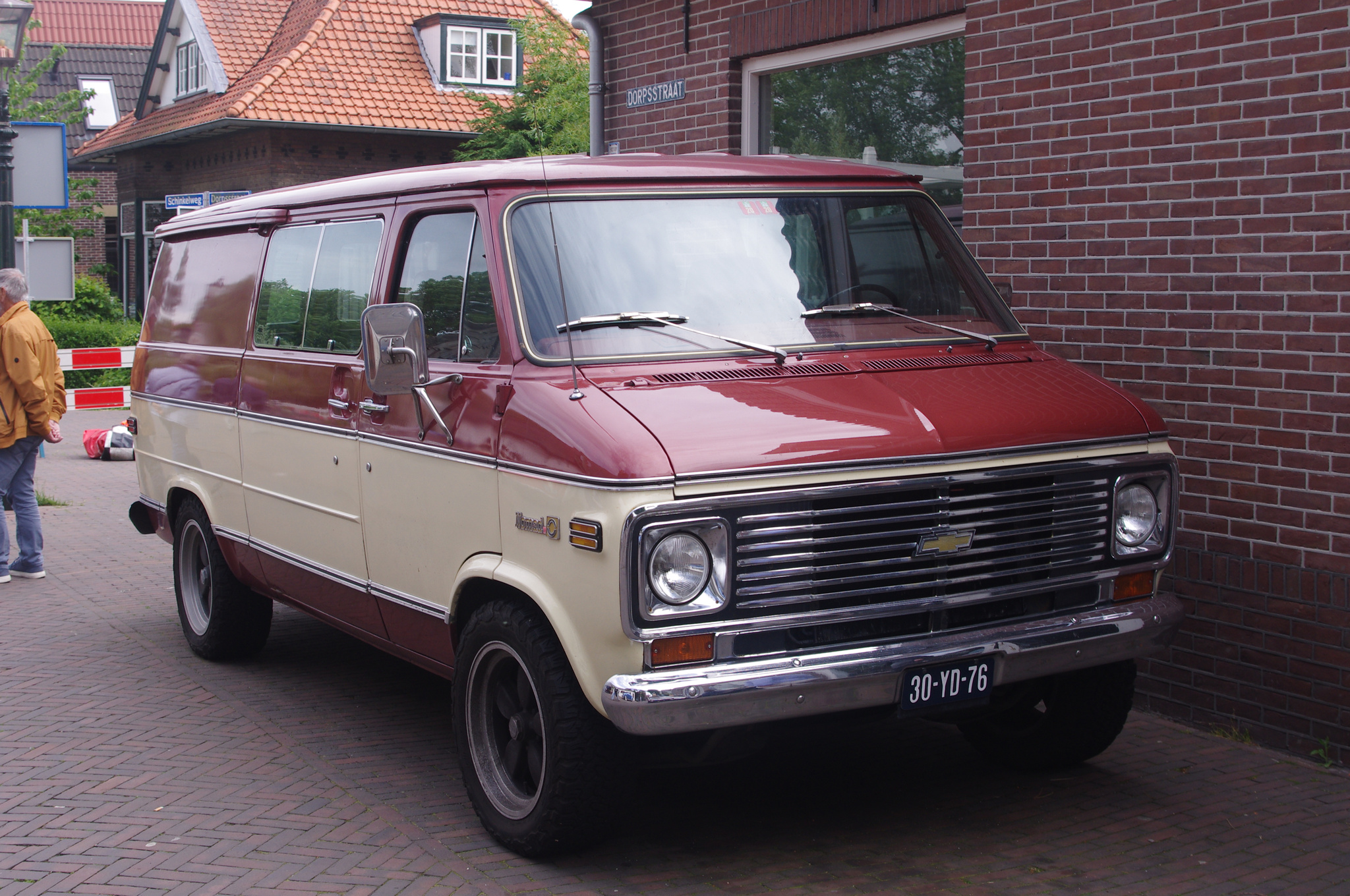
Chevrolet Nomad van

From 1977 to 1981, Chevrolet returned the Nomad name to use for a variant of the full-size Chevrolet Van. Effectively a hybrid of the cargo van and passenger van configurations, the Nomad was a five-passenger vehicle with a single rear row of seats and a cargo area consisting of paneled plywood walls and a rubber floor mat. Equipped similar to the higher-trim Chevrolet Beauville van, the Nomad received plaid upholstery and two-tone exterior paint.

The Nomad van was marketed by GMC as the GMC Gaucho; both vehicles were withdrawn as part of the 1982 model update of the Chevrolet Van.

== South Africa production (GMSA) ==
From 1976 to 1980, General Motors South Africa used the Chevrolet Nomad nameplate for its own vehicle line. Completely unrelated to any vehicle line from the United States, the Chevrolet Nomad produced in South Africa was an open-body utility vehicle. Locally considered a bakkie, the model line was offered with rear-wheel drive and powered by a 2.5-liter inline-four, paired with a 4-speed manual transmission.

Designed to keep production costs as low as possible, the Nomad was designed with simple construction; its entire body was assembled from flat panels. 82% of the vehicle was sourced within South Africa.). The remaining parts came from Germany (VDO instruments, BorgWarner transmission), Australia (rear axle from Holden), and the United States (Rochester carburetor). The inline-four engine was designed by Chevrolet, shared by the locally produced Chevrolet 2500 and others. Tuned for improved lower-end torque, the engine produced 76 kW (103 PS; 102 hp) at 4000 rpm, allowing for a top speed of 134.8 km/h (84 mph) in a period test. While fitted solely with rear-wheel drive, the Nomad was designed with off-road capability, coinciding with its short 82-inch wheelbase and high (10.4-inch) ground clearance; the body was fitted with a sump guard and a built-in box-section grille guard (the latter to protect the radiator and headlamps). To make up for the lack of four-wheel drive, a limited-slip differential was fitted as standard equipment.

Alongside the Land Rover and Jeep CJ, the Chevrolet Nomad was spartan in interior design, sold with only a driver seat and a passenger-side bench seat (allowing for 3-passenger seating) and a folding windshield. While a coolant gauge was supplied alongside the fuel gauge and speedometer, the Nomad was not equipped with parking design (or windshield washing) for the windshield wipers. For extra cost, the Nomad was offered with either a soft top or a fiberglass hardtop for weather protection; a heater was not supplied.

For 1976, GMSA assembled approximately 2,400 Nomads; with sales of the model line later falling to 250-300 annually, the model line was discontinued after 1980.

== Concept cars ==
1979 Chevrolet Nomad II concept car

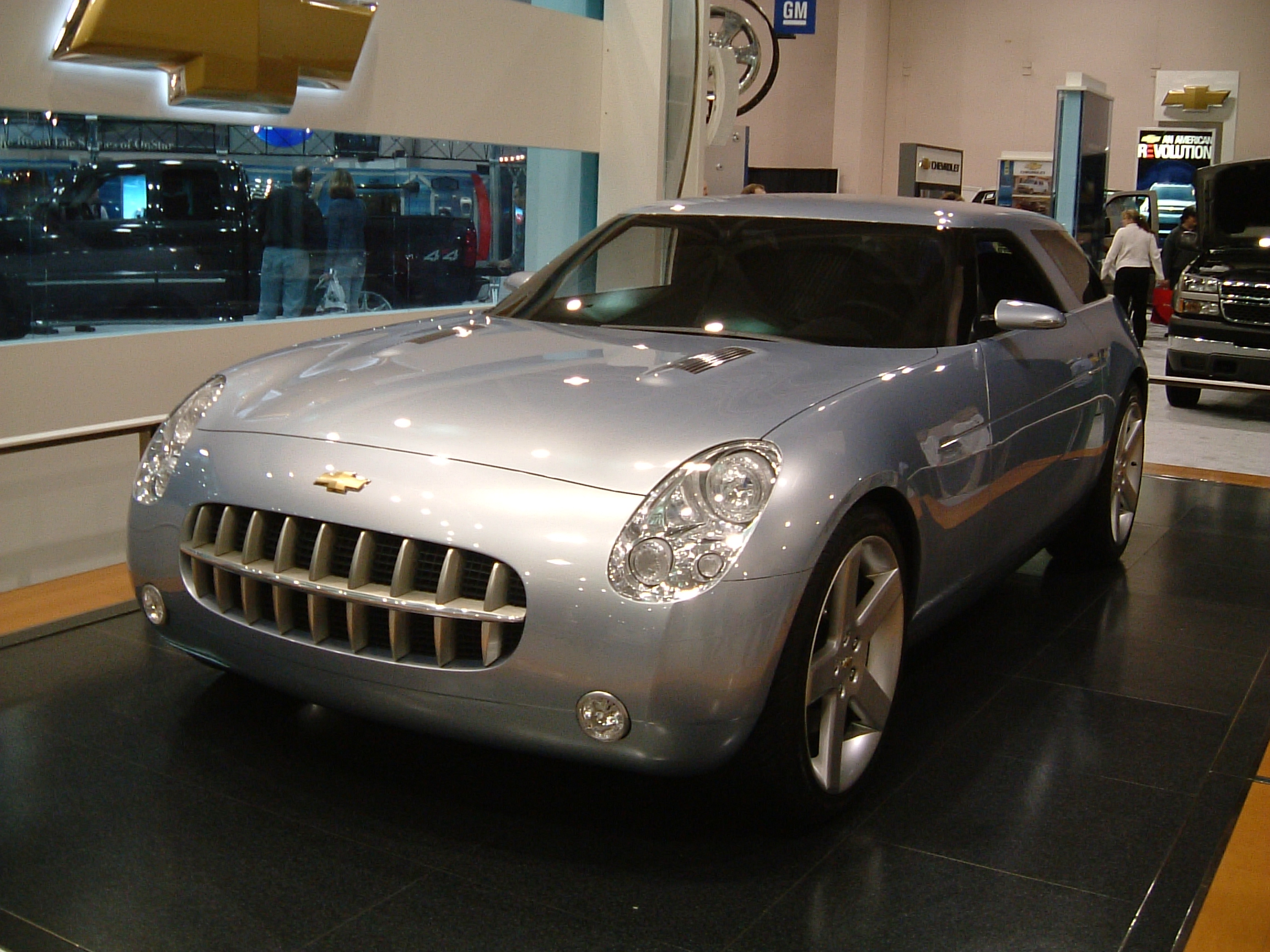
The 2004 Chevrolet Nomad concept car, with design cues from the original 1954 Corvette-based Nomad

In addition to the 1954 Motorama concept vehicle, Chevrolet has produced several prototypes and concept vehicles using the Nomad nameplate. In 1958, Chevrolet created a prototype hardtop version of the 1959 Nomad station wagon (using the doors of the Impala hardtop); the design was not approved for production. Coinciding with the development of the Chevrolet Camaro, several Nomad-badged clay models were produced in 1965, exploring a potential two-door station wagon version.

=== 1979 ===
In 1979, the Chevrolet Nomad II was developed as a running prototype as GM explored customer demand for minivans. Derived from the front-wheel drive X-body chassis, the Nomad II shared design elements from the Chevrolet Citation. While the vehicle was well-approved by potential customers, GM ultimately decided to shelve further development of the Nomad II. For 1990, the Lumina APV was released as the first front-wheel drive Chevrolet minivan.

=== 1991 ===
At the 1991 Chicago Auto Show, Chevrolet showcased a Nomad concept based on the Chevrolet Suburban.

=== 1999 ===
The Chevrolet Nomad reappeared on a concept vehicle for the 1999 Detroit Auto Show. Sharing its F-body chassis with the fourth-generation Chevrolet Camaro, the V8-powered Nomad served as an updated design of the Tri-Five two-door station wagon. To increase its functionality, a second curbside door was added, along with a retractable roof (features later entered into production by Saturn and GMC, respectively).

Introduced alongside the Pontiac Aztek concept car, potential production of the Nomad was effectively negated by the discontinuation of the GM F-body.

=== 2004 ===
To commemorate the 50th anniversary of the Motorama concept, a Chevrolet Nomad concept was released for the 2004 Detroit Auto Show. While again a 2+2 wagon, the 2004 Nomad was far smaller than its 1999 namesake, at only 155.5 inches long. The vehicle derived multiple design themes from the original Corvette Nomad, including its grille, headlight shape (trading screened openings for composite lenses), and forward-sloping B-pillar. Sharing the GM Kappa platform with the Pontiac Solstice, the four-seat Nomad included a sliding load floor and removable roof panel to aid loading of cargo.

== See also ==
- Ford Parklane, a direct competitor to the Nomad (1956)
- Ford Del Rio, a direct competitor to the Nomad (1957–58)
