= Musafir =

Musafir is a word in Arabic, Persian, Bengali, Hindi and Urdu meaning 'traveller'. In Romanian and Turkish it has come to mean 'guest'. It may refer to:

- Musafir (1940 film), an Indian social drama film by Chaturbhuj Doshi
- Musafir (1957 film), an Indian drama film by Hrishikesh Mukherjee
- Beyond the Last Mountain, a 1976 Pakistani English-language film by Javed Jabbar, released in Urdu as Musafir
- Musafir (1986 film), an Indian drama film by Jabbar Patel, based on Ashi Pakhare Yeti by Vijay Tendulkar
- Musafir (2004 film), an Indian action-thriller film by Sanjay Gupta
- Musafir (2013 film), an Indian drama film by Pramod Pappan
- Musafir (2016 film), a Bangladeshi film by Ashiqur Rahman
- Musafir (company), an Emirati travel agency

== See also ==
- Safar (disambiguation)
- Humsafar (disambiguation)
- Musafiraa, a 2024 Indian film by Pushkar Jog
- Musafirkhana, a town in Uttar Pradesh, India
- Mosafer, a Qatari travel retail chain
- Mosafer (TV series), an Iranian TV series
