= Humsafar (disambiguation) =

Humsafar refers to:

== Arts and media ==
- Hamsafar (film), a 1975 Iranian dramatic-romance film
- Humsafar (album), a 2008 album by KK
- Humsafar (novel), a 2008 Urdu novel by Farhat Ishtiaq
- Humsafar, a 2011-12 Pakistani soap opera based on the novel by Farhat Ishtiaq
- Humsafars, a 2014-2015 Indian television drama.
- "O Humsafar", a song by Shree Pritam, Shaan and Palak Muchhal from the 2013 Indian Bengali-language film Khiladi

== Other ==
- Humsafar Trust, an NGO based in Mumbai, India
- Humsafar is the in-flight magazine of Pakistan International Airlines
- Humsafar Express, a 3-tier sleeper long-distance premium train operated by Indian Railways

== See also ==
- Safar (disambiguation)
- Musafir (disambiguation)
