= 1955 Chevrolet =

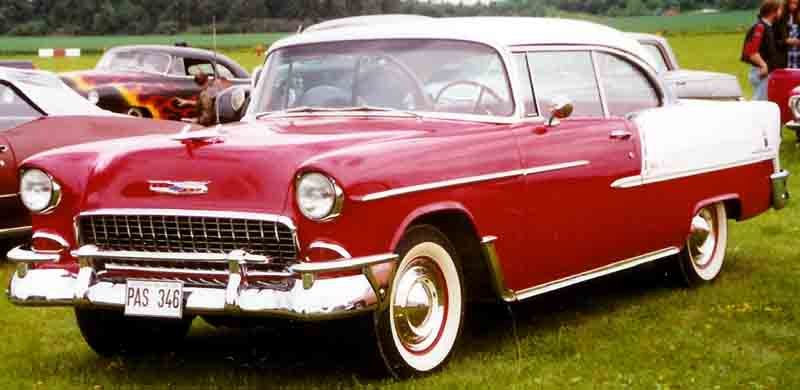
- 1955 Chevrolet Bel Air Sport Coupe

Overview
- Manufacturer: Chevrolet (General Motors)
- Also called: Chevrolet Bel Air; Chevrolet 210; Chevrolet 150; Chevrolet Nomad; Chevrolet Sedan Delivery
- Production: 1954–1955
- Assembly: United States; Canada; Woodville, Australia
- Designer: Bill Mitchell

Body and chassis
- Body style: 2-door coupé 2-door hardtop 4-door sedan 2-door convertible 2-door Station wagon 4-door Station wagon 2-door sedan delivery

Chronology
- Successor: 1956 Chevrolet

Hood ornament

The 1955 Chevrolet (sometimes referred to as the '55 Chevy) is an automobile which was introduced by Chevrolet in Autumn 1954 for the 1955 model year. It is considered a huge turning point for the manufacturer and a major success. It was available in three models: the 150, 210, and Bel Air.

The 1955 Chevrolet was the first successful Chevrolet with an optional V8 engine. Chevrolet had produced an earlier car with a V8 in 1918 (Chevrolet Series D), which used a 36-horsepower overhead valve 288-cubic-inch V8, but it remained in production for only a year. In 1955, Chevrolet decided to fit its new car with an overhead valve V8 engine design, which was similar to the 1949 Oldsmobile "Rocket 88" V8 engine, which was an earlier GM success. Chevrolet's new 265-cubic-inch overhead valve V8 was designed to be smaller and lighter than previous V8s in the automobile industry, and would come to be known as the "Chevy small block".

However, the new small block engine in the 1955 Chevrolet had some early teething issues. There were problems with cracked pistons, and there was no integrated oil filter, so an external bypass filter was offered as a factory or dealer option. Those who did not order the engine with the "oil filter option" dealt with a high frequency of oil changes. Even with the oil filter option, only part of the oil was actually filtered (the oil going through the thermostat). This issue was corrected for the next year when a full flow oil filter system was added to the engine. Additionally, to keep performance and mileage levels high, it required spark plugs and ignition points to be replaced on a regular basis.

The small-block Chevrolet V8 became so popular that Chevrolet still sells it today as a crate engine. There have been various changes made to the engine to modernize it since its introduction in 1954. However, the basic design of the original 265 remains in place.

== Body design ==
Additionally, Chevrolet drastically changed its body design. The 1955 Chevrolet had smooth, straight panels on the sides and hood. This was a major departure from previous years for Chevrolet. Although, Ford introduced what would be the first "shoe box" body design in 1949, GM and Chrysler were slow to catch on, only slowly replacing some of their bubble-like hood and side panels with flatter ones each year, without achieving a full shoebox look by 1954. But in 1955, Chevrolet designed the entire car with the full shoebox look. Along with the flatter, straighter panels, the 1955 also had modern cues like wrap-around glass on the windshield, and triangular taillights that jutted outward. This new look, combined with new power and engineering, made the 1955 an instant hit with the buying public and a critical success.

The car's popular "shoe-box" body style and chassis were carried over to 1956 (with changes to some of the front and rear aesthetics and bottom body line), and then carried over to 1957 (where the body was lengthened several inches in the rear and more drastic aesthetic changes were made).

The 1955, 1956, and 1957 Chevrolets are sought after by collectors, enthusiasts, and hot rodders, and the three model years are often referred to by the nickname the "Tri-Fives." Collectors will pay a premium for two-door models, and even more for the Bel Air version, especially the two-door hardtop (two-door, no side post).

== Options and trim ==
The 1955 Chevrolet also offered many other firsts for Chevrolet, including changing from a 6-volt to a 12-volt electrical system. The 1955 offered new options like air conditioning, power windows, power seats, power steering and power brakes. Other options included automatic light dimmers, door handle protectors, bumper protectors and "wonder-bar" radios. So many new options were available that some referred to the car as "Chevy's little Cadillac". Never before had so many options been offered for a car in the low-price field.

The 1955's top trim offering was the Bel Air, which had more chrome than the 150 and 210. The Bel Air, 210, and 150 models could be bought as a four-door, or as a two-door with a post between the front and rear passenger windows, known as the two-door sedan.

The 210 and Bel Air models could also come with a two-door hardtop, which was marketed as the "Sport Coupe". This body style had no post between the two side windows, resulting in a shorter roof and longer rear deck than the two door sedan. A convertible was also offered in the Bel Air series, featuring the same shorter roof and longer rear deck as the Sport Coupe.

The year 1955 also saw the introduction of the Bel Air Nomad, a sporty two-door station wagon which featured frameless door glass and elongated side windows. The unique roof design of the Nomad came directly from the 1954 Corvette Nomad, a "dream car" designed to be shown at auto shows as a concept sport wagon. Although regarded as one of the most beautiful station wagon designs of the era, the Nomad sold poorly, partly due to its price tag (one of the most expensive models in the Bel Air lineup) as well as its lack of four doors. Also, the Nomad's two-piece tailgate design was prone to letting excess rainwater leak through to the interior.

The 1955 offered a wide array of colors. One solid color, which was standard for the 150, could be had for the 210 or Bel Air; otherwise, nineteen different two-tone color combinations were also available.

Along with a standard column-mounted three speed synchro-mesh transmission, the buyer of a 1955 Chevrolet could specify an optional overdrive unit to go with it, or the fully automatic two-speed Powerglide transmission. Although most things were new in 1955 for Chevrolet, the reliable Powerglide was mostly unchanged from 1954.

== Models ==
There were nine different variations of the three models made in 1955, with differences in body, roof types, number of doors, and available equipment, but not all possible combinations were available.

Name and Description	150 Series	210 Series	Bel Air Series
4 Door Sedan: 6-passenger, 7-window sedan with a rear trunk.	X	X	X
2 Door Sedan: 6-passenger, 5-window sedan with a rear trunk.	X	X	X
Club Coupe: 6-passenger, 2-door, 5-window coupe with a rear trunk.		X	
Utility Sedan: 3-passenger, 5-window sedan with a rear trunk.	X		
Sport Coupe: 6-passenger, 2-door, 5-window pillarless hardtop coupe with rear trunk.		X	X
Convertible: 5-passenger, 2-door, 5-window coupe with folding top and rear trunk.			X
Nomad Wagon: 6-passenger, 2-door, 7 window "hardtop" wagon.			X
2 Door Station Wagon: 6-passenger, 5-window wagon with drop and lift gates.	X	X	
4 Door Station Wagon: 6-passenger, 7 window wagon with drop and lift gates.		X	X
Sedan Delivery: 2-passenger, 3 window, panel delivery wagon.	X		

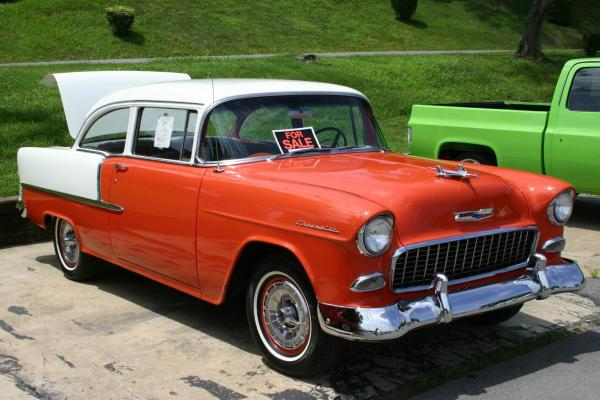
1955 Chevrolet 210 2-Door Sedan

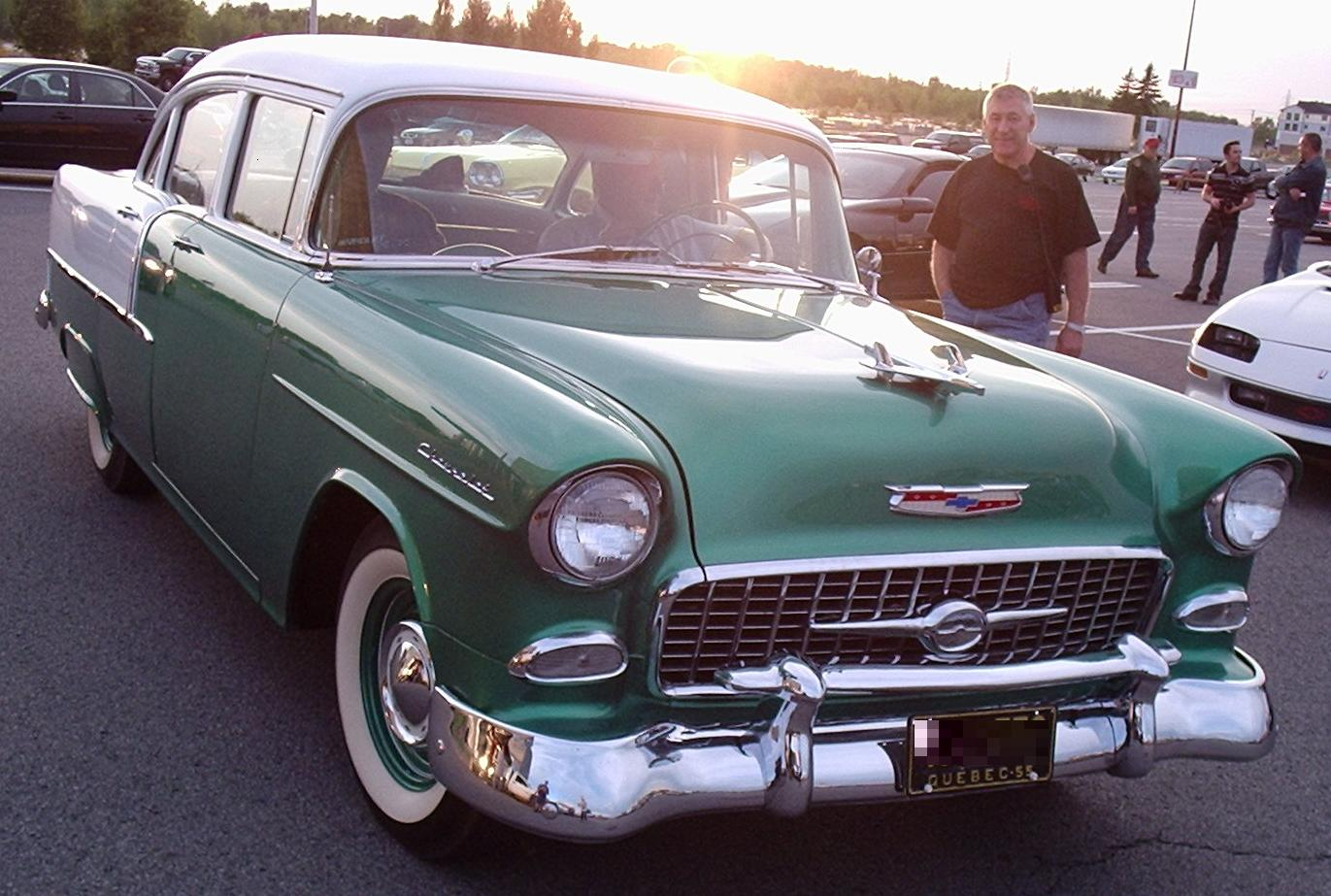
1955 Chevrolet 210 4-Door Sedan

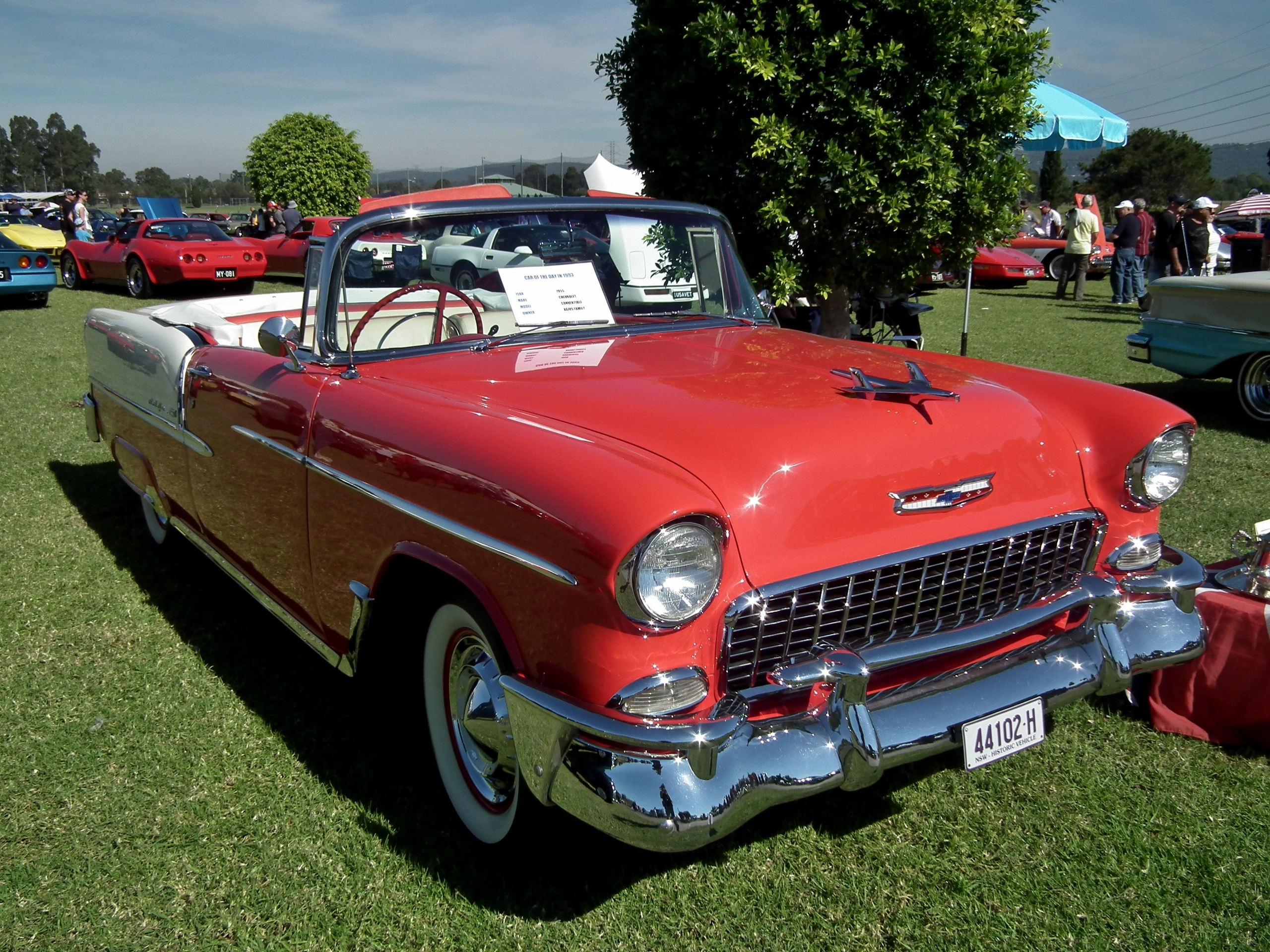
1955 Chevrolet Bel Air Convertible

== Engines ==
The following engines were available on the 1955 Chevrolet:

- OHV Inline 6 cylinder: 235 cubic inch, 123 horsepower
- OHV Inline 6 cylinder: 235 cubic inches, 136 brake horsepower (SAE)
- OHV V8: 265 cubic inches, 162 brake horsepower (SAE)
- OHV V8: 265 cubic inches, 180 brake horsepower (SAE), also known as the "Power Pack" engine
- OHV V8: 265 cubic inches, 195 brake horsepower (SAE), late in the model year, known as the "Super Power Pack"

The 265 was new for 1955, and it was the first V8 available in a Chevrolet since 1918 Model "D" was offered. That car did not sell well due to its price during an oncoming recession throughout World War I, so Chevrolet reverted to OHV inline 4-cylinder engines until 1929 when Chevrolet switched to an inline 6-cylinder engine. This reliable six cylinder would power Chevrolet cars until 1963 and was known as the "Stovebolt six". However, the new 265 V-8 in 1955 offered more power than the six, and weighed 100 pounds less.

The 265 was a big success, and was fitted to the majority of Chevrolet cars for decades in various cubic inch displacements. It is commonly referred to as the "Small Block Chevy" motor.

== Transmissions ==
The car was available with one of three transmission types, all with the shifter on the column:

- 3-speed Synchromesh manual
- 3-speed Synchromesh manual with overdrive
- 2-speed "Powerglide" automatic.

== See also ==
- 1917-1918 Chevrolet Series D V8, previous Chevrolet V8 engine
