= Pontiac Safari =

Pontiac line of station wagons (1955-1989)

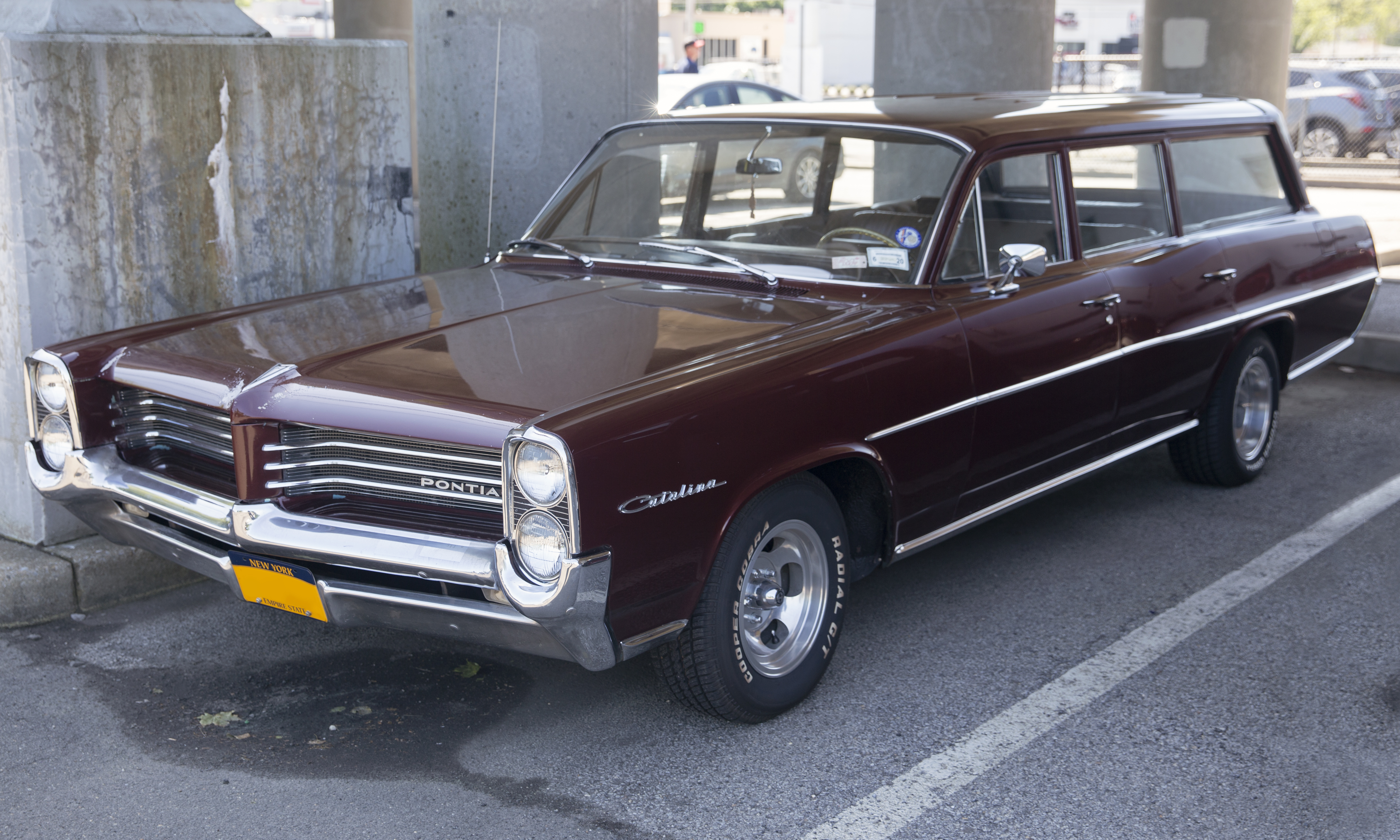
- 1964 Pontiac Catalina Safari

Overview
- Manufacturer: Pontiac (General Motors)
- Production: 1955–1989
- Model years: 1955–1989 (except 1982–1986)

Body and chassis
- Class: Full-size
- Body style: 3-door station wagon (1955–1957); 5-door station wagon (1958–1989)

Chronology
- Successor: Chevrolet Astro/GMC Safari; Pontiac Trans Sport

The Pontiac Safari is a line of station wagons that was produced by Pontiac from 1955 to 1989. Initially introduced as the Pontiac counterpart of the two-door Chevrolet Nomad, the division adopted the nameplate across its full-size wagon range in 1957. Through its production, the Safari was positioned between Chevrolet full-size station wagons and below its Buick and Oldsmobile counterparts. During the mid-1960s, the Safari added simulated woodgrain trim to the exterior, becoming a feature associated with the model line.

The name "safari" is derived from the Swahili word safari, which means journey, originally from the Arabic سفر (safar) meaning a journey; the verb for "to travel" in Swahili is kusafiri. As General Motors expanded into the intermediate, compact, and subcompact segments, the Safari nameplate saw a similar usage as the Estate (Buick, Chevrolet) and Cruiser (Oldsmobile) nameplates, denoting the highest-trim station wagon in each model range.

After 1989, Pontiac became the first GM division to discontinue its full-size wagons; along with model overlap between its divisional counterparts, demand for full-size wagons had been overtaken by minivans. For 1990, the Pontiac Trans Sport was introduced as the first Pontiac minivan. After 1991, Pontiac ended its use of the Safari nameplate (and production of station wagons) entirely; the GMC Safari continued through the 2005 model year.

== 1955–1957 (A-body) ==
Pontiac Star Chief Custom Safari Series 27
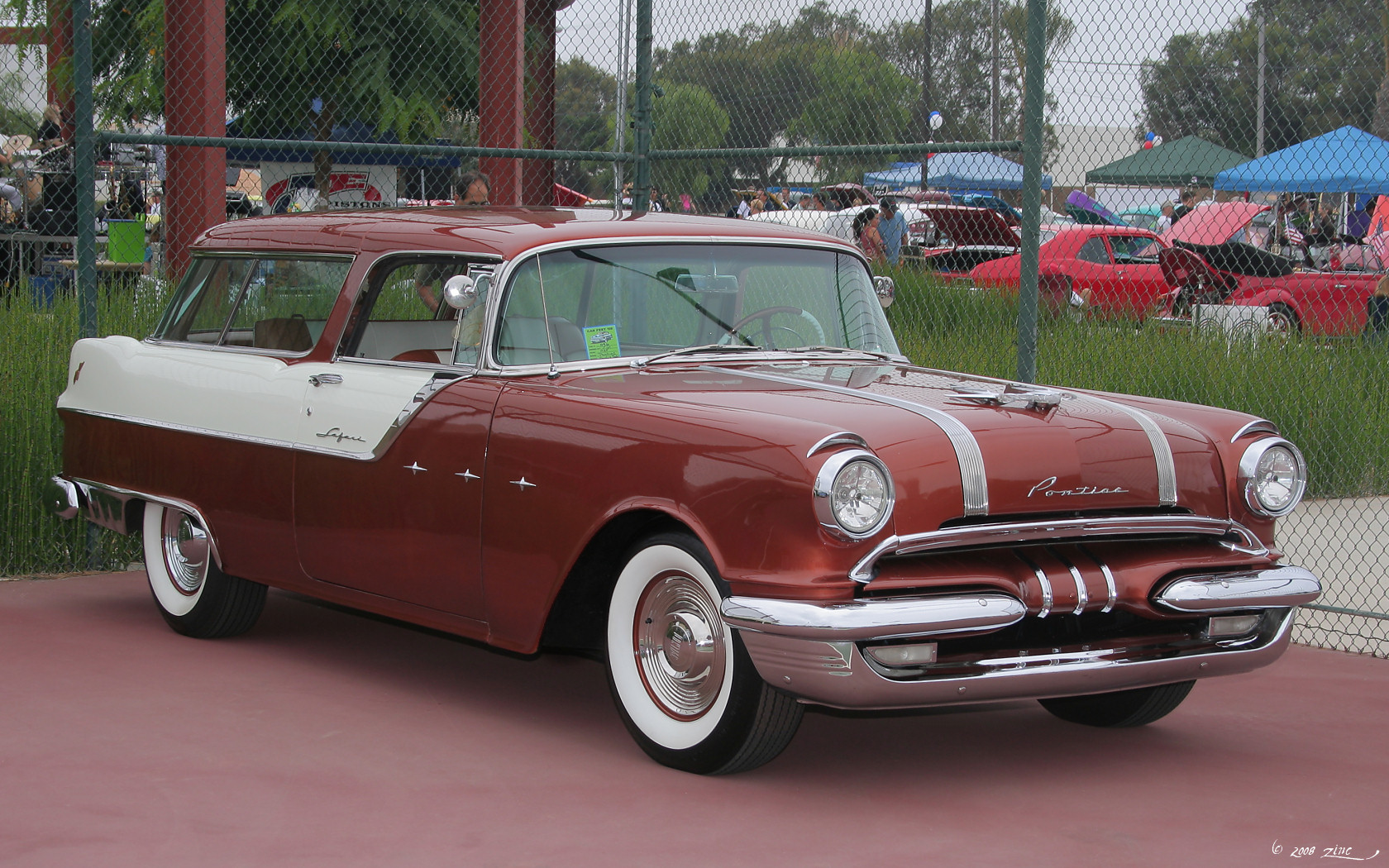
- 1955 Pontiac Star Chief Custom Safari

Overview
- Production: 1955–1957
- Assembly: Pontiac Assembly, Pontiac, Michigan; South Gate Assembly, South Gate, California; Lakewood Assembly, Atlanta, Georgia; Framingham Assembly, Framingham, Massachusetts; Fairfax Assembly, Kansas City, Kansas; Arlington Assembly, Arlington, Texas; Linden Assembly, Linden, New Jersey; Wilmington Assembly, Wilmington, Delaware

Body and chassis
- Body style: 3-door station wagon 5-door station wagon (1957 Transcontinental)
- Platform: A-body

Powertrain
- Engine: 287 cu in (4.7 L) Strato Streak V8 (1955); 316.6 cu in (5.2 L) V8 (1956); 347 cu in (5.7 L) V8 (1957)
- Transmission: 3-speed manual 3-speed Strato-Flight Hydra-Matic

Dimensions
- Wheelbase: 122 in (3,100 mm)
- Length: 204.3 in (5,189 mm)
- Width: 76.6 in (1,950 mm)
- Curb weight: 3,746 lb (1,699 kg)

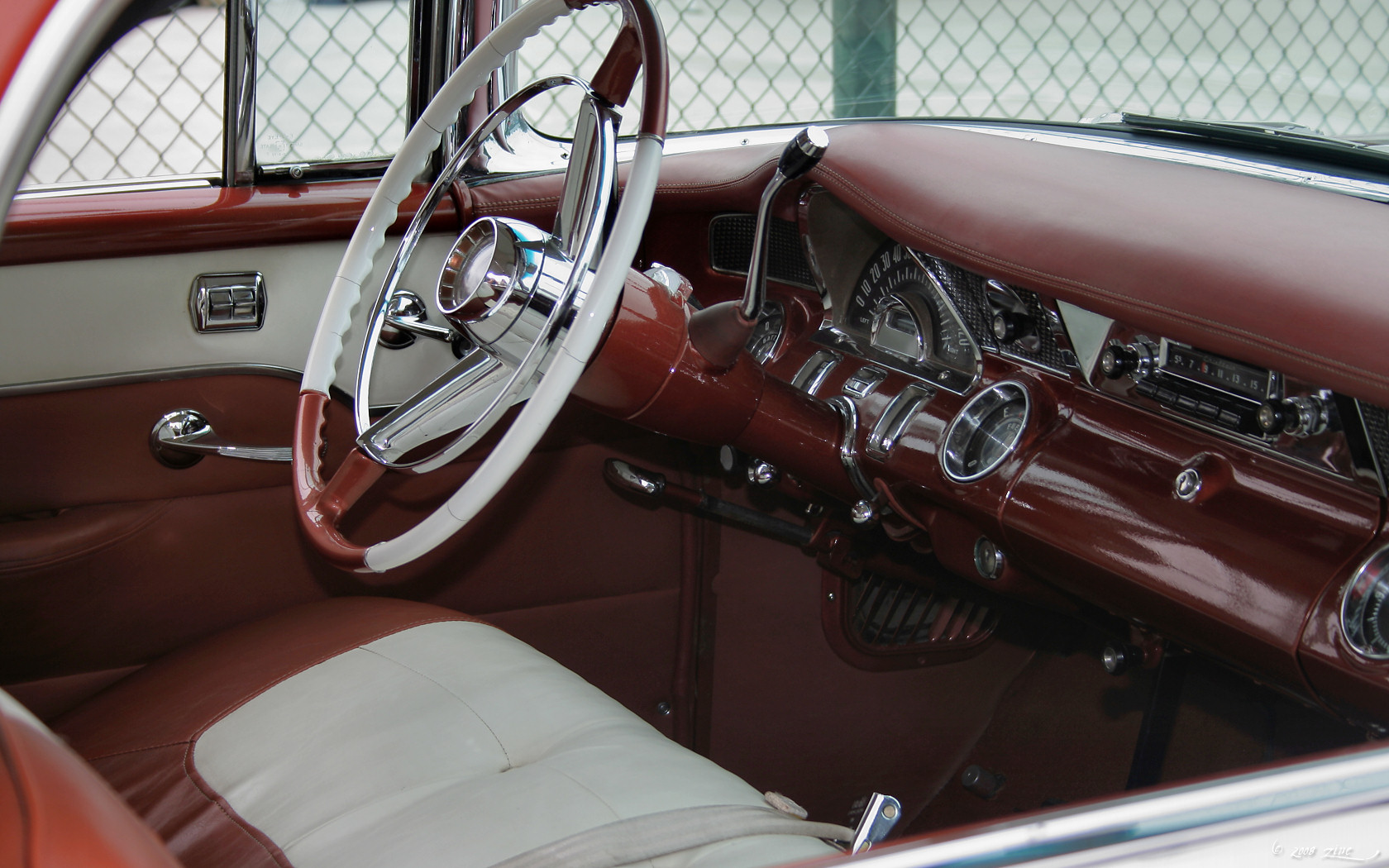
1955 Pontiac Star Chief Custom Safari interior

The first-generation Pontiac Safari was developed as a divisional counterpart of the Chevrolet Nomad. The two-door sport wagon began life as a 1954 Motorama concept car derived from the Chevrolet Corvette. To decrease tooling and production costs, the design was shifted to the full-size A-body chassis (from the Corvette) to increase its sales potential; to further decrease overall design costs, the Pontiac Safari was created to share the design across two divisions.

Sharing its 122-inch wheelbase A-body chassis with the Nomad (derived from the Chevrolet Bel Air), the Safari shared its exterior bodywork with the Pontiac Chieftain. Though using the shorter-wheelbase A-body chassis, Pontiac considered the Safari part of the B-body Pontiac Star Chief series, officially designating it as the Star Chief Custom Safari (Series 27).

=== 1955 ===
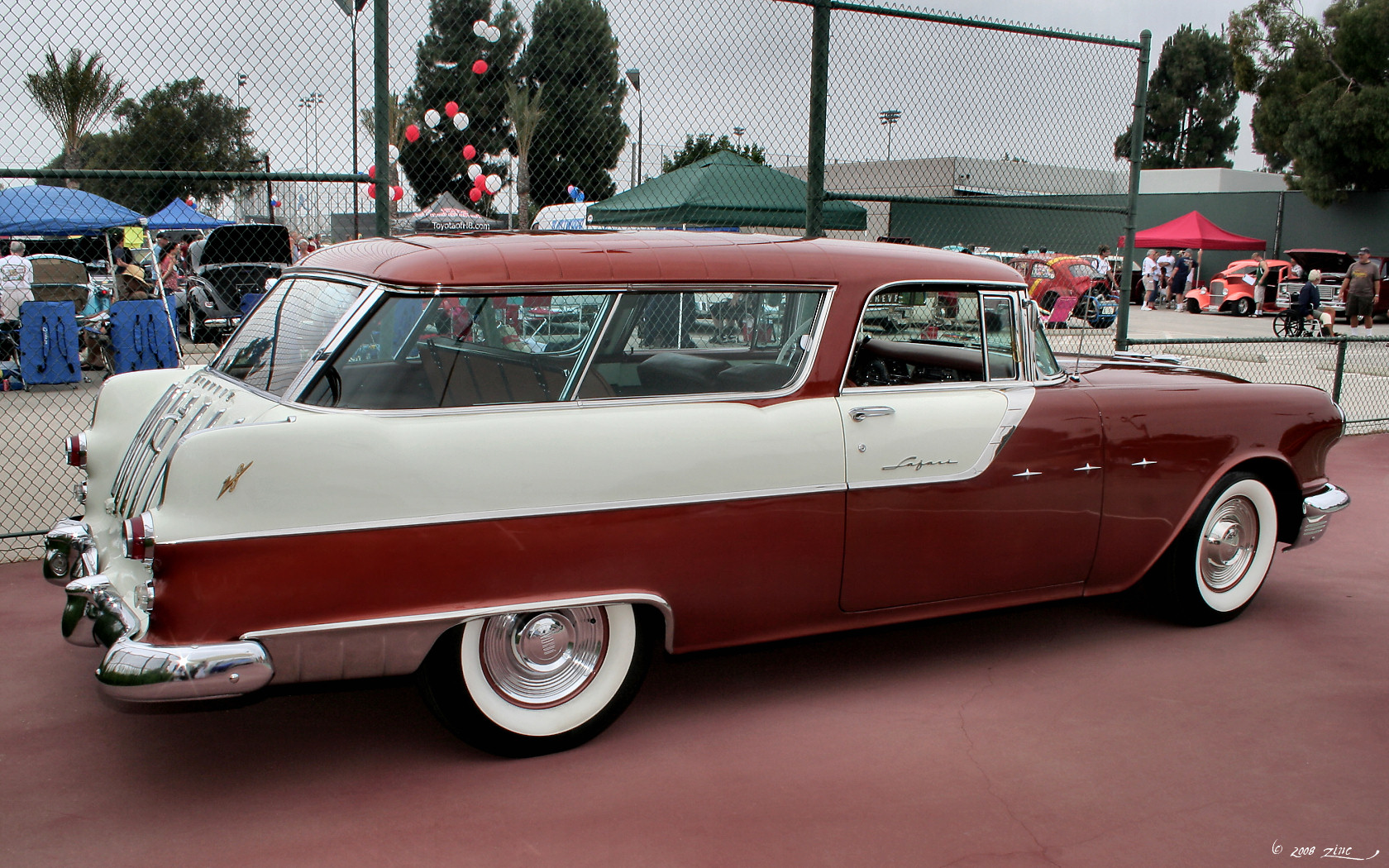
1955 Pontiac Star Chief Custom Safari

Introduced on January 31, 1955, the Pontiac Safari served as the flagship Pontiac station wagon; at $2,962 ($35,599 in 2025 dollars), it also was the most expensive Pontiac model line before optional equipment was added using the GM "A" platform. To distinguish the model from the Nomad, the Safari was fitted with a Pontiac Chieftain front fascia and model-specific rear taillamps, styled by Pontiac stylist Paul Gillan (who received a U.S. patent for the front fascia design).

In contrast with a standard two-door 860 "Colony" station wagon (also derived from the Chieftain), the Safari was styled with coupe-style front doors, forward-raked B-pillars (with windows wrapping around from pillar to pillar); along with extra chrome trim (fitted to the tailgate), the rear seat windows slid open. In line with the Nomad being derived from the top-trim Bel Air, the interior of the Safari was shared with Star Chief sedans.

The Safari was fitted with a 287 cubic-inch V8, producing 180 hp with a 2-barrel carburetor or 200 hp with a 4-barrel carburetor.

For 1955, 3,760 examples of the Safari were produced, serving as the lowest-production Pontiac for the model year.

=== 1956 ===
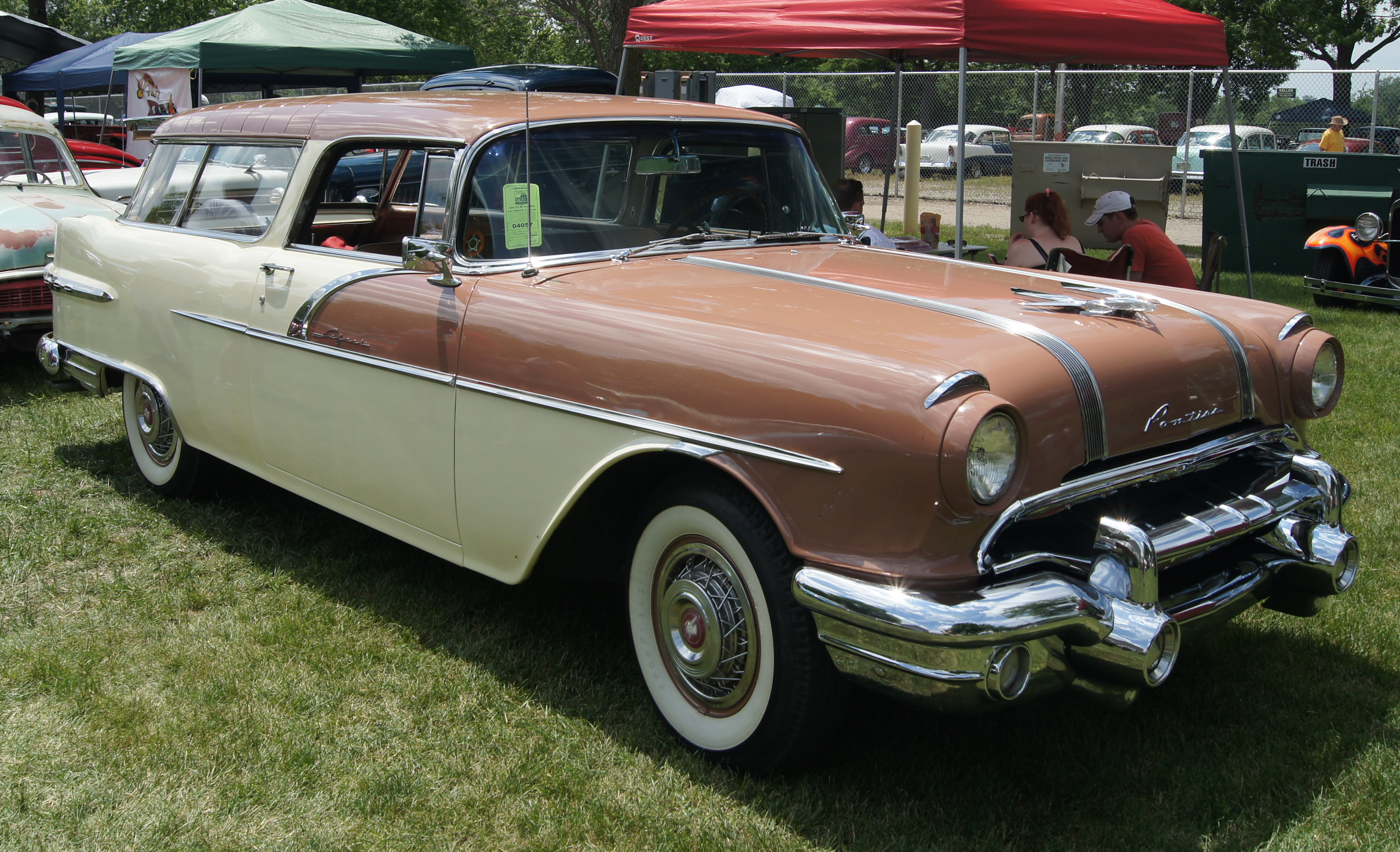
1956 Pontiac Star Chief Custom Safari

For 1956, the Safari underwent a minor exterior revision. Along with a redesign to the front and rear bumpers, the bodyside trim was restyled. As two-tone paint was standard for the model line, the change now painted the roof in the accent color; the interior also saw revisions to the seats and door panels.

The V8 engine was expanded to 317 cubic inches for 1956, with the Safari offering 227 hp in its standard configuration (single 4-bbl carburetor); an optional 216 hp version was offered (with a 2-bbl carburetor), and 285 hp (with 2x4-bbl carburetors).

While 10 vehicles were produced with a manual transmission, a 4-speed automatic transmission was paired with the V8 as standard equipment.

For its first full year, the Safari improved sales to 4,042, again serving as the lowest-produced Pontiac.

=== 1957 ===
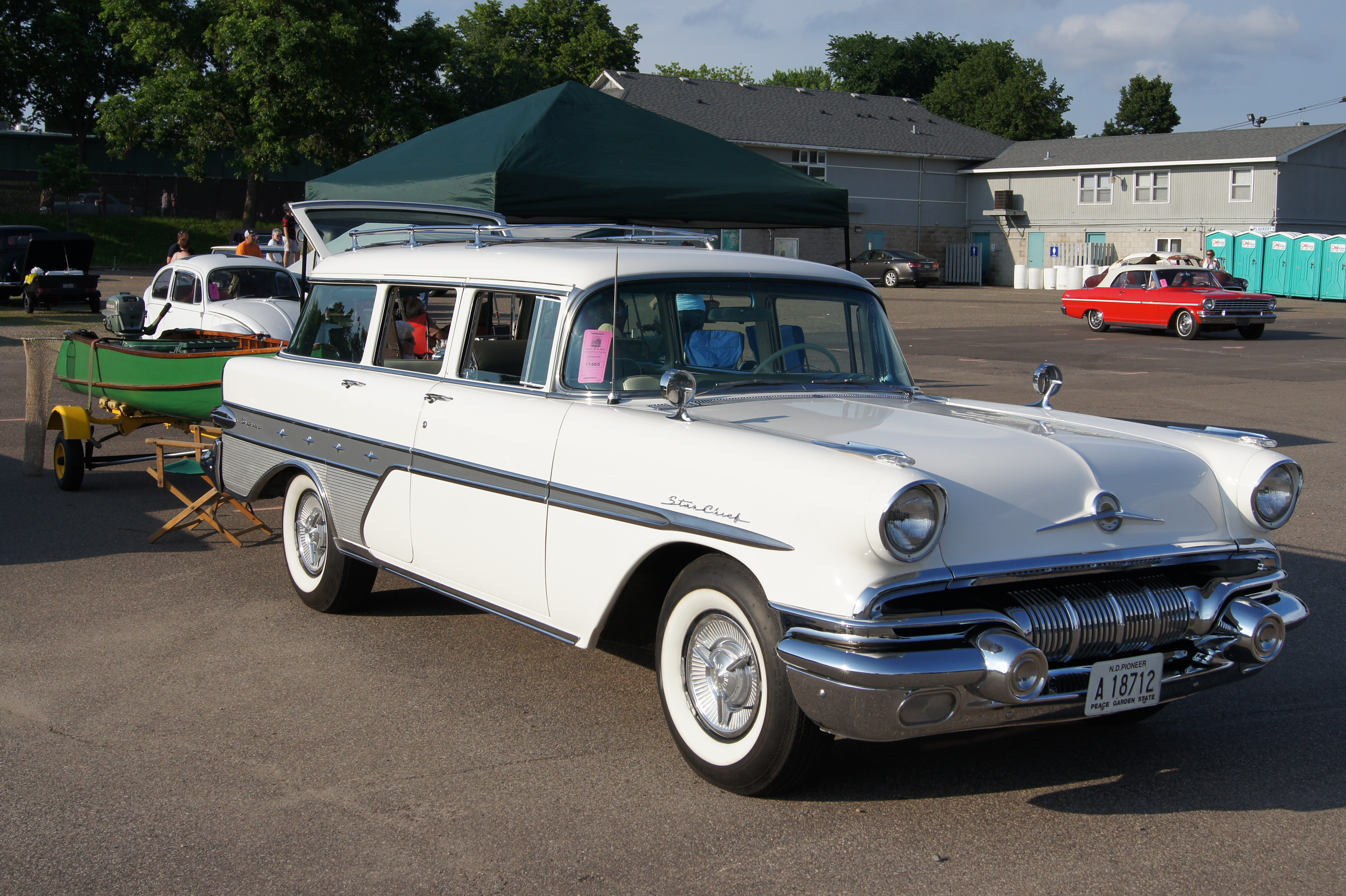
1957 Pontiac Star Chief Custom Safari Transcontinental (four-door)

For 1957, Pontiac expanded the usage of the Safari nameplate to all of its station wagons, replacing the previous 860 and 870 with Chieftain Safari and Super Chief Safari station wagons. The previous Star Chief Custom two-door sport wagon remained in production; during the middle of the 1957 model year, a four-door Star Chief Custom station wagon was introduced, named the Safari Transcontinental. In contrast to the two-door Safari and its four-door counterparts, the Safari Transcontinental was fitted with model-specific side trim (shared with no other Pontiac) and a standard roof luggage rack.

As with all Star Chiefs, the two-door Safari was fitted with a 347 cubic-inch V8, produced with 270 hp (4-bbl) or 290 hp (3x2bbl).

For 1957, the Star Chief Custom Safari declined in sales to 1,294 vehicles (1,894 Transcontinentals), again serving as the slowest-selling Pontiac; the model lost out to the Star Chief Bonneville as the most expensive model line.

In total, 9,094 examples of the A-body Safari were sold from 1955 to 1957.

== 1957–1989 (B-body) ==
For 1958, GM ended production of its two-door sport wagons, as the slow-selling Nomad and Safari had both served as the most expensive cars sold by Chevrolet and Pontiac. While the two-door sport wagons had been retired (as consumer tastes had largely shifted away from two-door wagons), both nameplates saw further use, with both divisions again using them for redesigned station wagons. Following its adoption by the B-body chassis during 1957, Pontiac returned the Safari for 1958, using the nameplate as a secondary series designation.

=== 1958–1965 ===
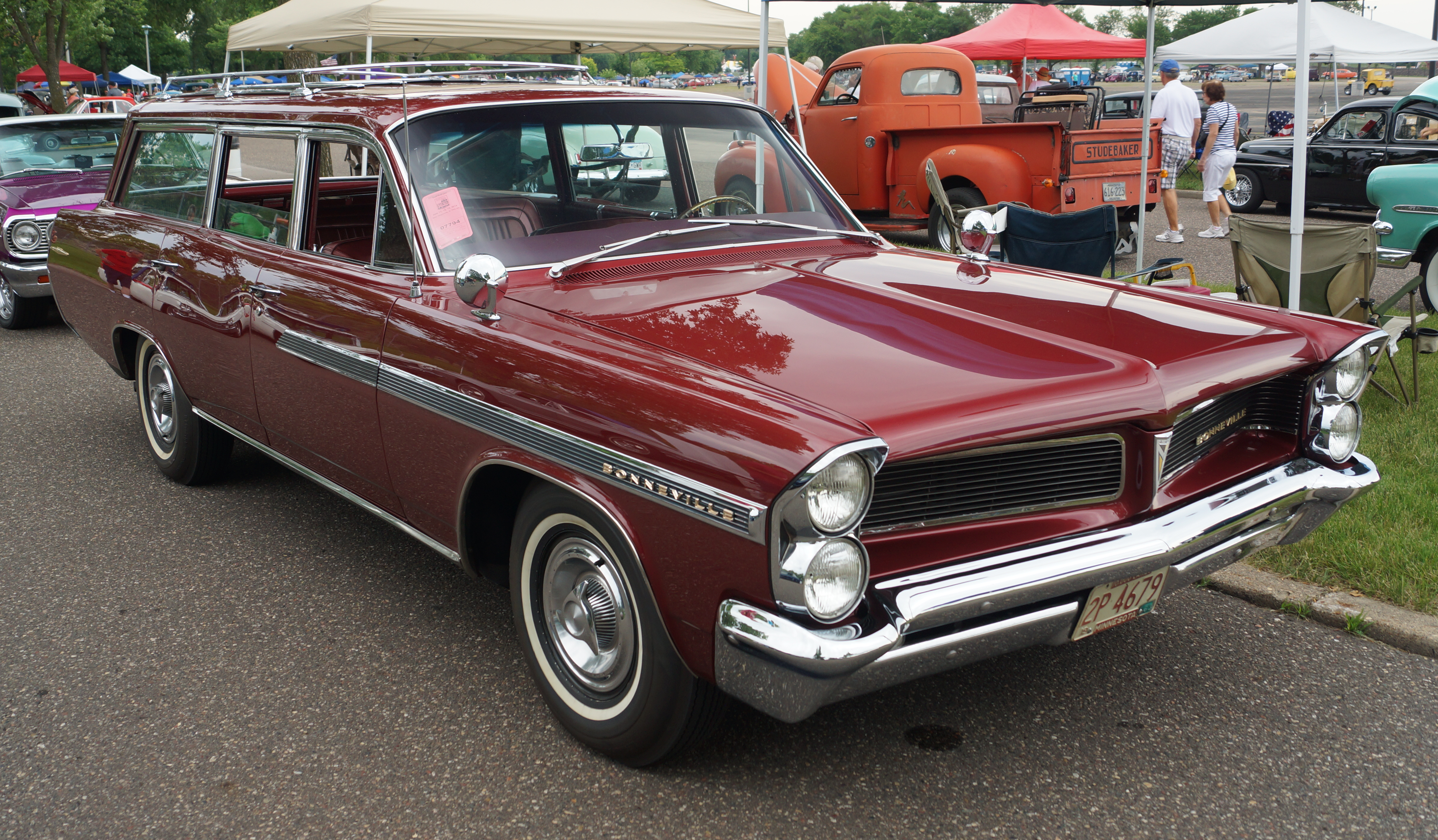
1963 Pontiac Bonneville Safari

For 1958, Pontiac offered a Safari for the Chieftain and Star Chief ranges. The Transcontinental wagon returned, taking the Star Chief Custom Safari nameplate of the previous two-door wagon (the Bonneville remained a hardtop/convertible). For 1959, Pontiac revised its model range, introducing the Catalina Safari and Bonneville Safari (the Star Chief remained, becoming sedan-only). The Bonneville was offered with two rows of seating; the Catalina was offered with either two or three rows of seats.

Following a slight downsizing for 1961, the Safari returned as part of the Catalina and Bonneville series, with the 9-passenger option remaining exclusive to Catalina Safaris.

For 1965, full-size Pontiacs underwent a redesign, with the Safari again returning as a part of the Catalina and Bonneville series. For the exterior, a vinyl roof was introduced as an option.

=== 1966–1970 ===
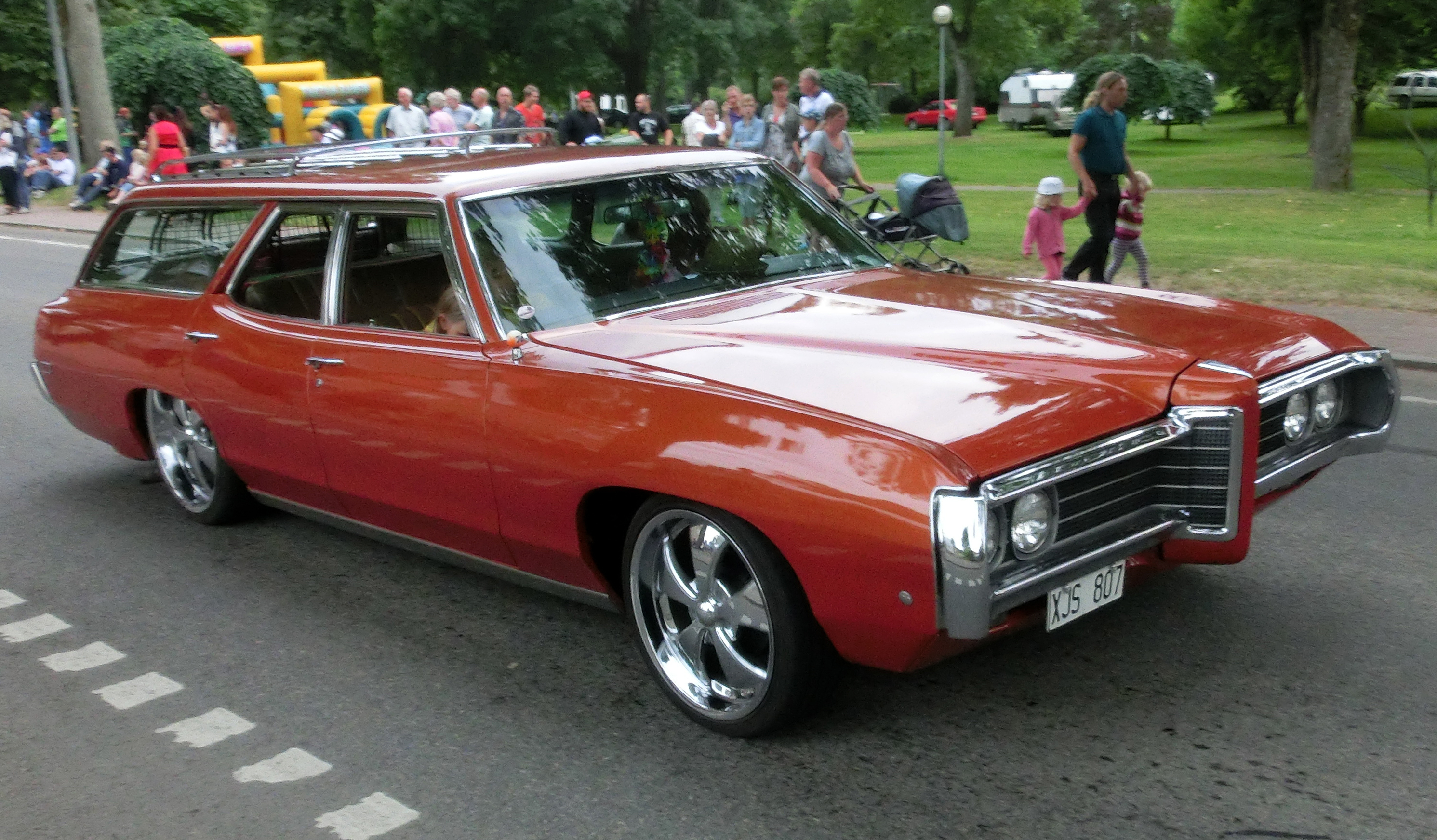
1969 Pontiac Executive Safari (aftermarket wheels)

For 1966, the Safari nameplate was dropped by Pontiac, as its B-body station wagons (Catalina and Bonneville) deleted the secondary series designation. For 1967, the Safari nameplate returned for the newly introduced Pontiac Executive full-size station wagon (replacing the Star Chief) and the top level Bonneville Safari, with the term "Safari" used to identify exterior woodgrain trim for the first time; all three wagons were offered with third-row seating.

=== 1971–1976 ===
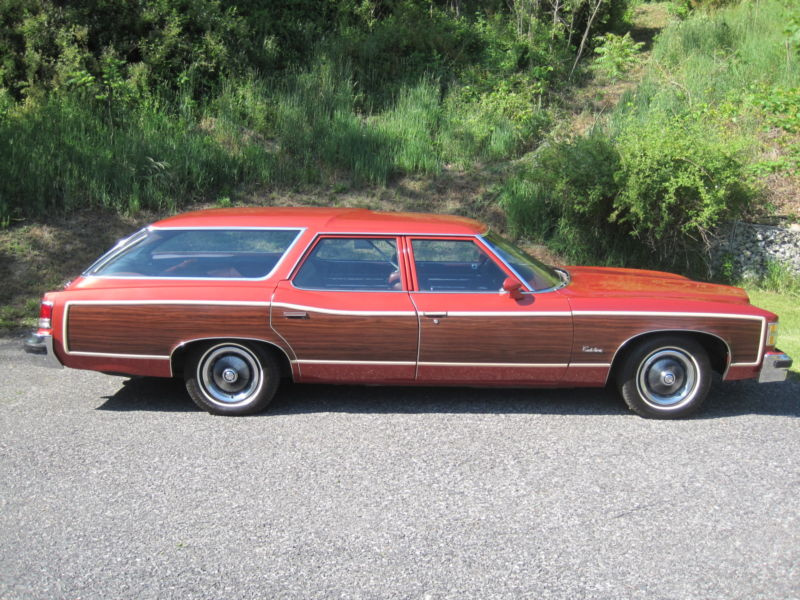
1976 Pontiac Catalina Safari

For 1971, Pontiac revised its station wagon branding, making the Safari a stand-alone model series based on the Catalina. The Bonneville station wagon was dropped in favor of the Grand Safari, which itself was based on the Grand Ville series. In 1973 the Grand Safari also adopted exterior woodgrain trim. Officially designated as a B-body vehicle, the Safari (and its Buick/Oldsmobile counterparts) shared the 127-inch wheelbase of the C-body "senior" sedan chassis.

For 1974, the Safari again became a secondary series designation, becoming part of the Catalina range; the model line adopted the rectangular headlights introduced on full-size Pontiacs for 1975.

==== Glide-away tailgate ====
The 1971-1976 Safari wagons featured a clamshell tailgate, with separate, independently operable window and tailgate components. The rear power-operated glass could deploy from the roof as the tailgate (manually or with power assist), could deploy from a recess under the cargo floor. The power assist tailgate, the first in station wagon history, ultimately supplanted the manually operated tailgate, which required marked effort to lift from storage. Both the window and tailgate portions of the system were operable via switches on the instrument panel or a key switch on the rear quarter panel. The system, heavy and complex, made it easier to load and unload the extremely long wagons in tight spaces — for example, the entire tailgate could open inside a closed garage or with a trailer installed. But the design was not adopted by other manufacturers and would be eliminated when GM reduced the length of their wagons by about a foot for model year 1977, when the overriding concern became increased fuel economy.

=== 1977–1981 ===
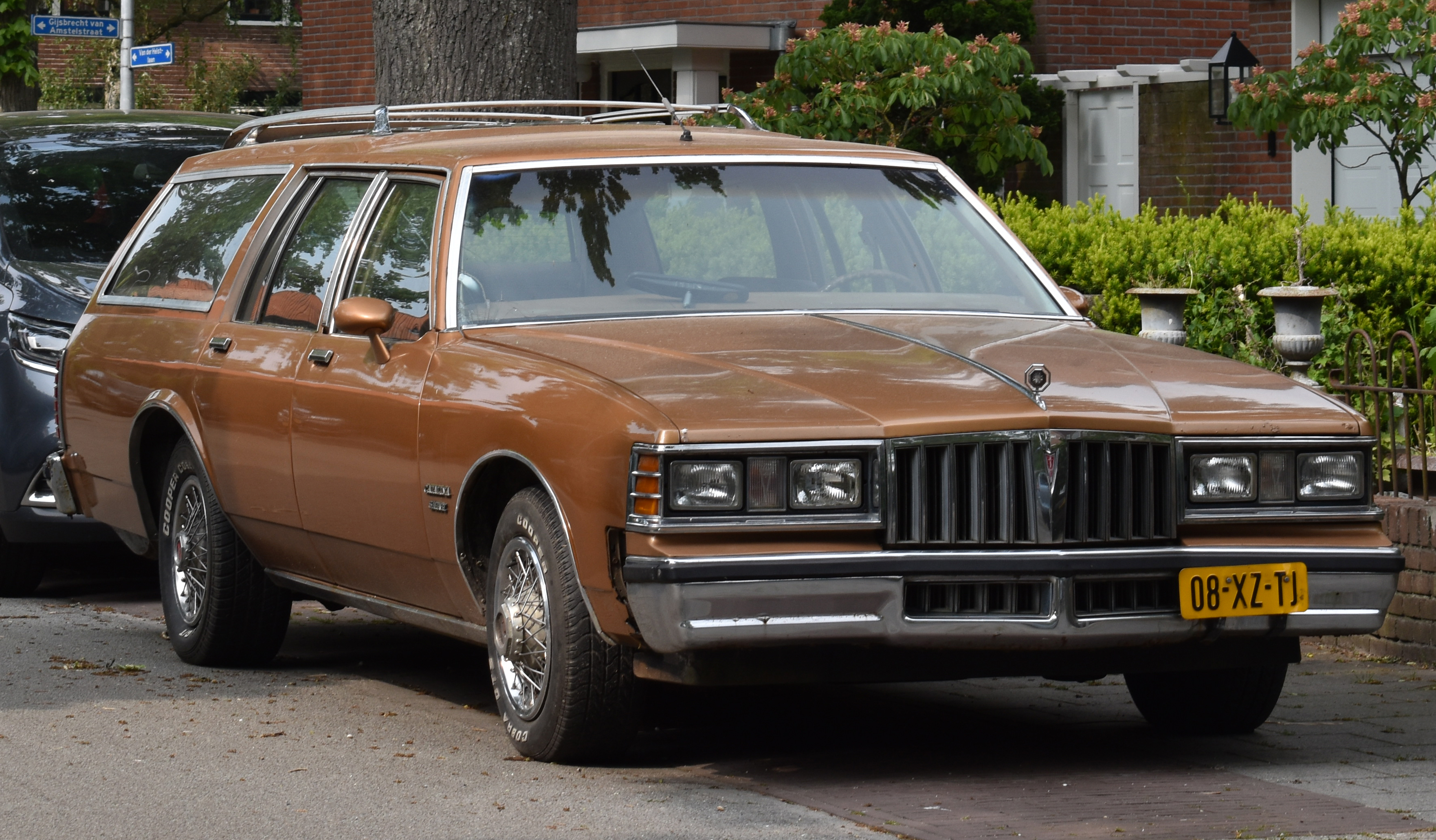
1980 Pontiac Catalina Safari

For 1977, Pontiac downsized the Safari alongside the rest of its full-size B-body vehicles. Shedding over 1000 pounds of curb weight (dependent on powertrain), the Safari remained part of the Catalina range. In place of the previous 400 and 455 cubic-inch V8s, 301 and 403 cubic-inch V8s were fitted to the model line; a 350 cubic-inch V8 was also added as an option.

For 1979, the Grand Safari was renamed the Bonneville Safari (marking the return of the combined nameplate for the first time since 1965). As with its Grand Safari predecessor, the Bonneville Safari was distinguished by external (simulated) woodgrain trim.

Following the 1981 model year, Pontiac revised its full-size model line; the Catalina was discontinued while the Bonneville was downsized a second time (adopting the body of the four-door Oldsmobile Cutlass Supreme). The B-body Bonneville was replaced with the Pontiac Parisienne in the United States (adopting a design closer to the Chevrolet Caprice). For 1982, the Safari name was largely placed on hiatus across Pontiac, replaced by "Wagon".

=== 1987–1989 ===
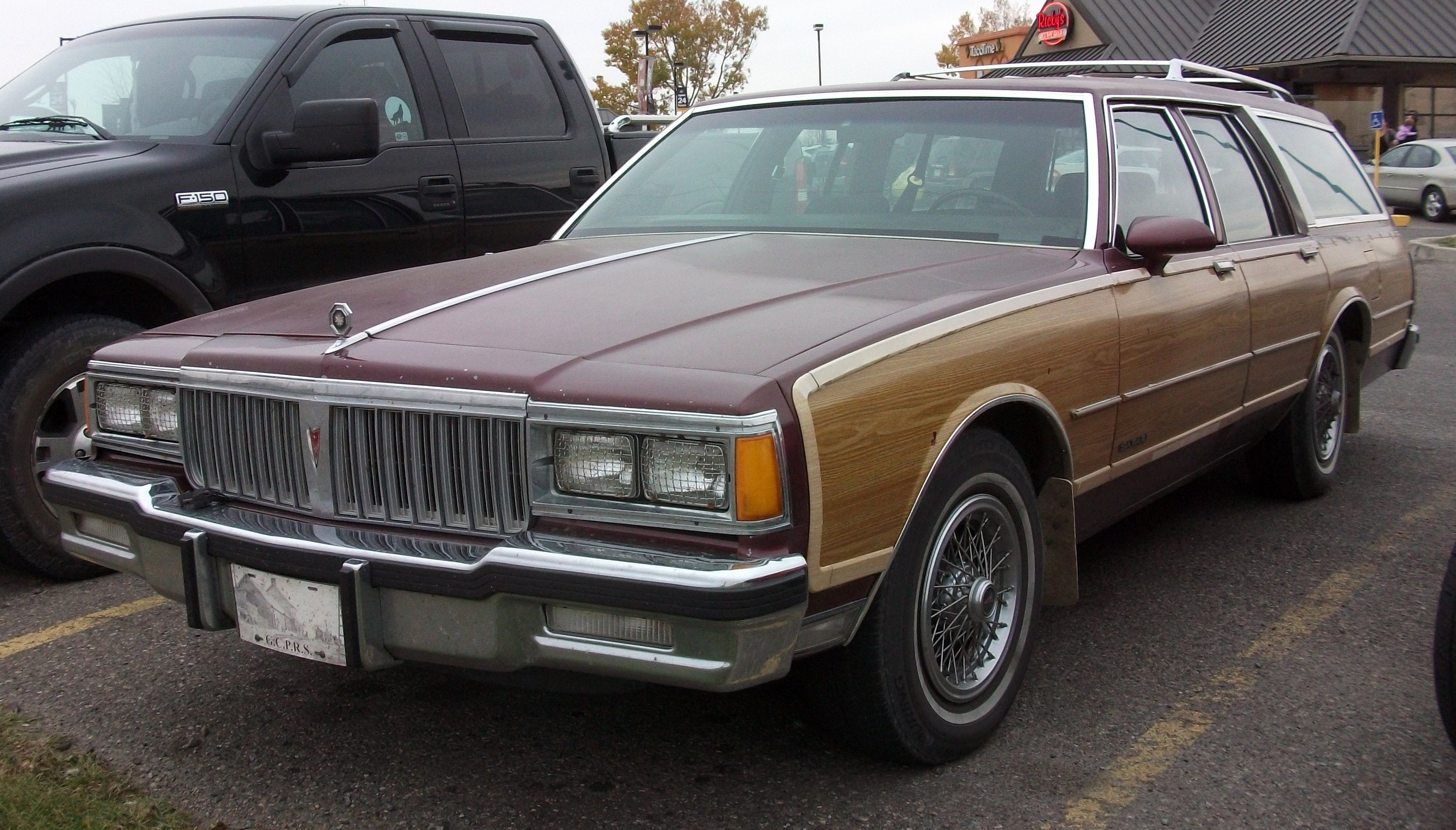
1987-1989 Pontiac Safari

For 1987, Pontiac retired the Parisienne sedan from its model range, with the Parisienne Wagon rebranded as the Pontiac Safari, marking the first use of the name since 1981. While used as a stand-alone nameplate for its full-size B-body station wagon, the change marked the introduction of Pontiac Sunbird Safari and Pontiac 6000 Safari wagons.

As full-size station wagons were declining in demand relative to minivans in the late 1980s, the Pontiac Safari faced internal divisional competition by the higher-volume Chevrolet Caprice Estate and the premium-content Oldsmobile Custom Cruiser and Buick (Electra) Estate. While the Safari nameplate had become a part of the Pontiac model range for nearly three decades, in 1985, GMC had introduced the GMC Safari mid-size van. For the first time, GM marketed two distinct vehicles in North America with the same model nameplate in two different divisions (sometimes in the same dealer network).

Pontiac discontinued the Safari station wagon after the 1989 model year, becoming the first GM division to end use of the B-body chassis. For 1990, the division entered the minivan segment for first time, marketing the Pontiac Trans Sport. The Safari nameplate remained in use by Pontiac through 1991, ending with the mid-size 6000 Safari (another model range replaced by the Trans Sport).

The GMC Safari ended production after 2005; as of current production, this remains the final use of the nameplate by General Motors.

== Other uses of name ==
Alongside its use by the Pontiac B-body station wagon range (including the Chieftain, Star Chief, Catalina, Executive, Bonneville, and Parisienne), Pontiac expanded the use of the Safari nameplate beyond its full-size model range for 1961 as it introduced a Tempest Safari compact station wagon. Along with their full-size namesakes, smaller Safari wagons (from the mid-1960s onward) adopted external woodgrain trim as a distinguishing feature.

=== Grand Safari (1971–1978) ===
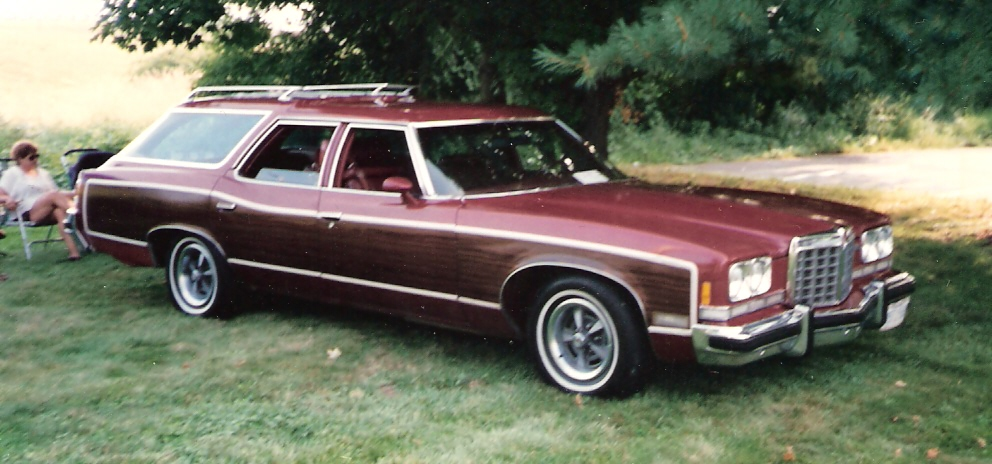
1974 Pontiac Grand Safari

For 1971, the Pontiac Grand Safari was introduced, serving as the station wagon of the Pontiac Grand Ville. Slotted above the Catalina-based Safari, the model line was distinguished by its exterior woodgrain trim (a few examples were produced with it deleted). The counterpart of the Buick Estate and the Oldsmobile Custom Cruiser, the first-generation Grand Safari would be the largest vehicle ever sold by Pontiac.

For 1977, the Grand Safari was downsized alongside the rest of the B-body model line. As Pontiac discontinued the Grand Ville, the Grand Safari now served as the Bonneville station wagon. In an effort to reduce branding confusion, Pontiac renamed the model line as the Bonneville Safari for 1979 (effectively returning to the name of its 1970 predecessor).

=== Sunbird Safari (1987–1988) ===
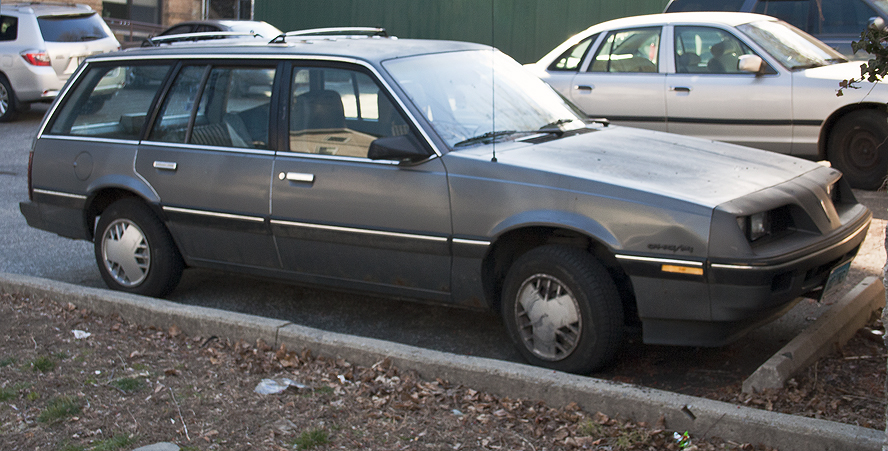
1987 Pontiac Sunbird Safari

For 1987, the Pontiac Sunbird station wagon was renamed the Sunbird Safari. In contrast to full-size and mid-size Safaris, the Sunbird Safari was not offered with exterior woodgrain trim.

Coinciding with the mid-1988 update of the model line, Pontiac dropped the Safari name from the Sunbird station wagon.

=== 6000 Safari (1987–1991) ===
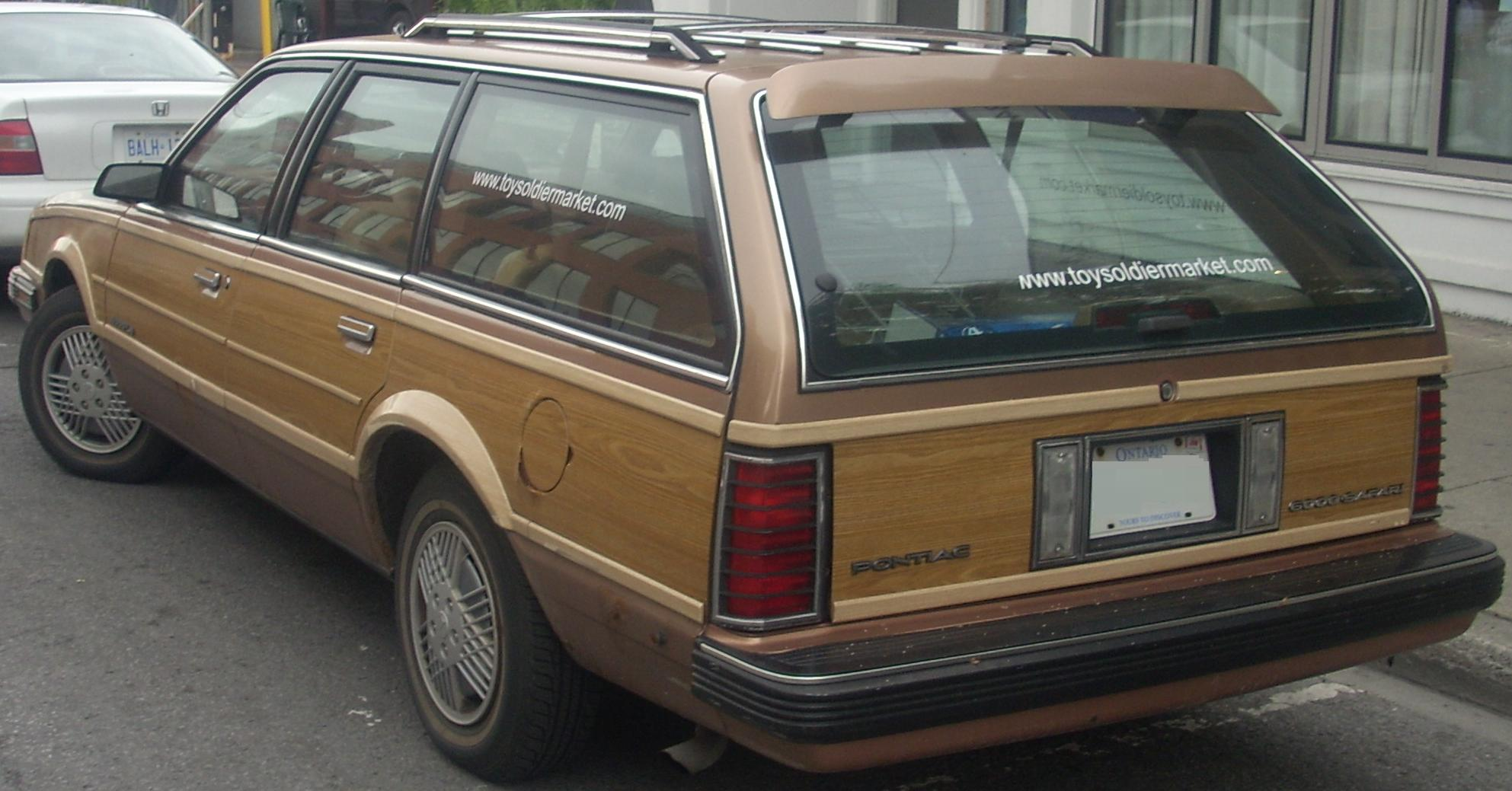
Pontiac 6000 Safari (1989–1991)

For 1984, Pontiac introduced a station wagon bodystyle for the Pontiac 6000, replacing the previous Bonneville G station wagon as its mid-size offering. In 6000 LE trim, the model line was offered with optional exterior woodgrain trim. In 1987, the 6000 LE wagon was renamed the 6000 Safari, sharing the optional V6 of the 6000 STE.

After 1991, the Pontiac 6000 was replaced by the Grand Prix (introduced as a four-door sedan for 1990), becoming the final Pontiac station wagon.

=== GMC Safari (1985–2005) ===
For 1985, the GMC Safari mid-size van was introduced as a divisional counterpart of the Chevrolet Astro. At the time, the Pontiac Safari nameplate had been on hiatus, leading to the concurrent usage of the name by both divisions from 1987 to 1989 (GM would also do so with the Chevrolet Astro and GMC Astro).

The first (and currently, only) minivan sold by GMC, the Safari van continued the usage of the nameplate until the 2005 discontinuation of the model line.
