= Safar (neighborhood) =

Safar صفر
- Location in Egypt
- Coordinates: 31.201716°N 29.880223°E
- Country: Egypt
- Governorate: Alexandria
- City: Alexandria
- Time zone: UTC+2 (EET)
  - Summer (DST): UTC+3 (EEST)

Safar (Arabic: صفر) is a neighborhood in Alexandria, Egypt.

== See also ==
- Neighborhoods in Alexandria
