= El Sfar Mosque =

Mosque in Tunis, Tunisia

- مسجد الصفار

Religion
- Affiliation: Sunni Islam

Location
- Location: Tunis, Tunisia

Architecture
- Type: Mosque

El Sfar Mosque (Arabic: مسجد الصفار), was a Tunisian mosque located in the medina of Tunis. It does not exist anymore.

== Localization ==
The mosque was located on Sidi Sourdou Street.

== History ==
The saint Mohammed Ben Ali Sourdou (Arabic: محمد بن علي الصوردو), also known as Sidi Sourdou (died 1873), used to pray in this mosque.
