= Zip =

Zip, Zips or ZIP may refer to:

== Common uses ==
- ZIP Code, USPS postal code
- Zipper or zip, clothing fastener

== Science and technology ==
=== Computing ===
- ZIP (file format), a compressed archive file format whose typical file extension is .zip
  - zip, a command-line program from Info-ZIP
- Zipping (computer science), or zip, reorganizing lists of lists
- Zip drive, a removable disk storage system
- Zone Information Protocol, AppleTalk protocol
- Zip Chip, Apple II accelerators by Zip Technologies
- .zip (top-level domain), an Internet top-level domain operated by Google Registry

=== Other science and technology ===
- Zip tone, in telephony
- Zig-zag in-line package, electronic packaging
- Zip fuel, a type of jet fuel
- Zip tie, a cable fastener
- Zrt- and Irt-like proteins, or Zips, zinc transporters

== Arts, entertainment and media ==
- Zip (game), a children's game
- Zip (roller coaster), at Oaks Amusement Park, Oregon, US
- Zip, a band formed by Pete Shelley
- Zip Comics, 1940-1944
- ZIP FM, a radio station, Vilnius, Lithuania
- ZIP Magazine, UK
- Zip, a character in the Tomb Raider video games
- Zip, a vertical line in Barnett Newman's paintings

=== Film and television ===
- Zip (TUGS), a character in the British children's television series TUGS
- title character of Zip, the Dodger, a 1914 film starring Fatty Arbuckle
- ZIP, a fictional amnestic drug in the Blindspot TV series

== Business, enterprise and production ==
- ZIPS: zero inventory production system, an aspect of lean manufacturing
- Zip (airline), a former Canadian airline
- Mr. ZIP, a promotional character
- Piaggio Zip, a scooter
- Zip Co, an Australian fintech company
- Zip Industries, an Australian manufacturer of hot water dispensers
- Zip's Drive-in, an American restaurant chain
- Zip.ca, a Canadian DVD rental service
- Zip card, for travel in London, UK
- Zip Fires, firelighters

== Places ==
- Žíp, a village in Slovakia
- Spiš or Zips, Slovakia
- Zip City, Alabama, US

== People ==
- Zip Collins (1892–1983), American baseball player
- John Connolly (FBI) (born 1940), nicknamed "Zip"
- Zip Hanna (1916–2001), American football player
- Zip Zabel (1891–1970), American baseball player
- Bohdan Zip (1929–2017), Canadian politician
- Zip the Pinhead, American freak show performer William Henry Johnson (c. 1857–1926)
- a ring name of Tom Prichard (born 1959), American retired professional wrestler

== Other uses ==
- Zip, slang for zero
- Zips, a derogatory term used by Italian-American mobsters for newer immigrant Sicilian and Italian mafiosi
- Akron Zips, the University of Akron athletic teams
- Zip Feed Tower, a former grain elevator in Sioux Falls, South Dakota, US

== See also ==
- Zip gun (disambiguation)
- "Zip, Zip, Zip", an episode of the TV series How I Met Your Mother
- Zipp (disambiguation)
- Zipper (disambiguation)
- Zippy (disambiguation)
