= Sáfár =

Sáfár (lit. "steward", Hungarian pronunciation: [ˈʃaːfaːr]) is surname found in Hungary. Notable people with the name include:

- Nicholas Sáfár, Hungarian nobleman
- Sáfár family
- Stephen Sáfár, Hungarian diplomat
- Szabolcs Sáfár, Hungarian footballer

== See also ==
- Safar (surname)
- Šafář, a surname found in Czech Republic
