= Safarov =

Safarov (Russian: Сафаров, Azerbaijani: Səfərov) is a surname, found in Russia, Azerbaijan, and Tajikistan. Its feminine version is Safarova (Russian: Сафарова; Azerbaijani: Səfərova). It is a slavicised version of Safar adding the suffix -ov. People with this name include:

- Azad Safarov (born 1985/1986), Ukrainian journalist and filmmaker
- Bayram Safarov (born 1951), Azerbaijani politician
- Emil Safarov (born 2002), Azerbaijani footballer
- Fariz Safarov (1920–1965), Azerbaijani Soviet Army Major
- Firudin Safarov (1933–2024), Azerbaijani theatre director, Professor of Tashkent State Conservatory
- Georgy Safarov (1891–1942), Russian Bolshevik revolutionary and politician
- Gurban Safarov (born 2004), Azerbaijani footballer
- Irina Safarova (born 1969), Russian long-distance runner
- Jalil Safarov (1962–1992), Azerbaijani war hero
- Khalida Safarova (1926–2005), Azerbaijani painter
- Latif Safarov (1920–1963), Azerbaijani actor and movie director
- Manuchekhr Safarov (born 2001), Tajikistani footballer
- Maryam Safarova (born 2003), Azerbaijani group rhythmic gymnast
- Orkhan Safarov (born 1991), Azerbaijani judoka
- Rafael Safarov (1947–2019), Russian football coach and a former player
- Ramil Safarov (born 1977), Azerbaijani murderer
- Rovshan Safarov (born 1988), Azerbaijani Paralympic judoka
- Ruslan Safarov (born 1979), Russian football player
- Saparbek Safarov (born 1986), Russian mixed martial artist
- Samir Safarov (born 1979), Azerbaijani military officer
- Sangak Safarov (1928–1993), Tajik paramilitary leader and warlord
- Zemfira Safarova (born 1937), Azerbaijani and Soviet musicologist
- Zuleykha Safarova (born 1999), Azerbaijani tennis player

== See also ==
- Safar (given name), a given name from Azerbaijan and Iranian Azerbaijan
- Safar (surname), a surname of different etymologies
- Saparov
