= Language history =

Language history is;

- Historical linguistics
- History of a language
  - Internal history
  - External history
- Evolution of languages
