= Bohemian Society of Sciences =

Bohemian Society of Sciences was the first official scientific organization within Bohemia.

== History ==
The Bohemian Society of Sciences was created from the Private Society for Mathematics, Patriotic History and Natural History, the first scientific society within the frontiers of the later Czechoslovakia. This organization was founded in 1772 and published six volumes of its proceedings before becoming the Bohemian Society of Sciences, and then later becoming the Royal Bohemian Scientific Society in 1784. Its members included Masons and Illuminatis, and the Royal Bohemian Scientific Society it later established some ties with the Private Scientific and Patriotic Society of Moravia.

In the early 18th century, the institution began to become, partially due to its usage of both Czech and German languages, which caused it to lose some of the more radical Czech scientists while the creation of the Vienna Academy caused the loss of some of the German-speaking scientists. By 1847, members of the Royal Bohemian Society of Sciences moved to the Vienna Academy, however, some of the members moved to other academies. Members moving to academies other than the Vienna Academy included: Palacký, Šafařík, Zippe, Presl and Purkyně.

After 1847 the sciences have continued to play a role in the Czech state, continuing through the creation of the Czech Academy of Sciences and Arts, which was created in 1890 through a decree issued by Emperor Franz Joseph, which existed among many other institutions. During World War II, most scientific research was halted due to the Nazi occupation, but was restarted in 1952 with the creation of the Czechoslovak Academy of Sciences, which continues to operate today.
