= Alexander Potebnja =

Russian-Ukrainian philosopher, linguist and panslavist activist

- Александр Потебня
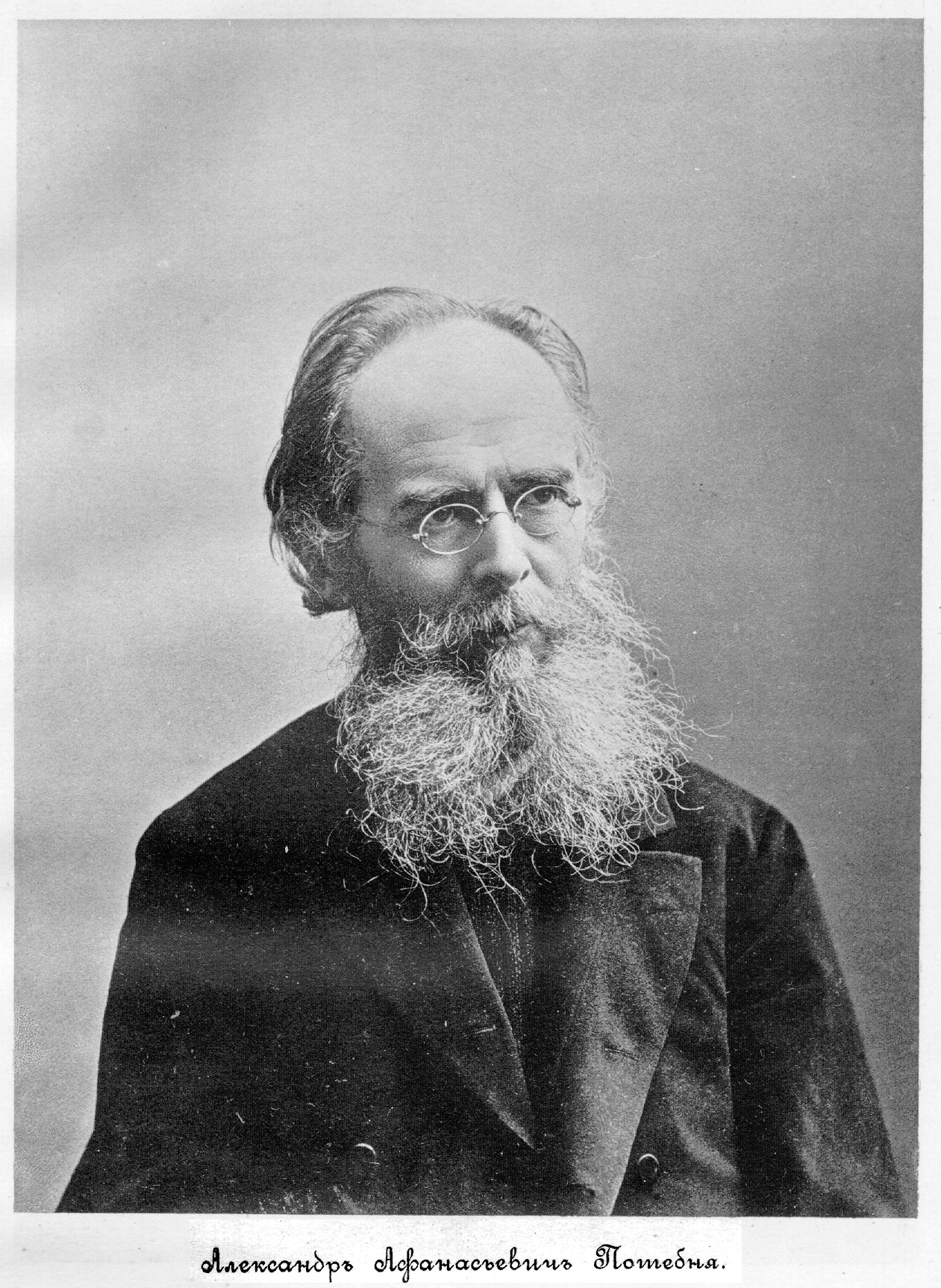
- Born: 22 September 1835; Maniv, Romensky Uyezd, Poltava Governorate, Russian Empire (now Ukraine)
- Died: 11 December 1891 (aged 56); Kharkov, Russian Empire
- Spouse: Maria Potebnja (née Zalenska)

Alexander Afanasyevich Potebnja (Russian: Алекса́ндр Афана́сьевич Потебня́; Ukrainian: Олекса́ндр Опана́сович Потебня́, romanized: Oleksandr Opanasovych Potebnia; September 22, 1835 – December 11, 1891) was a Russian Imperial and Ukrainian linguist, philosopher and pan-Slavist of Ukrainian Cossack descent, who was a professor of linguistics at the Imperial Kharkov University. He is well known as a specialist in the evolution of Russian phonetics.

He constructed a theory of language and consciousness that later influenced the thinking of his countryman the Psychologist Lev Vygotsky. His main work was Language and Thought (Russian: Мысль и язык) (1862). He also published a number of works on Russian Grammar, on the History of the Sounds in the Russian Language and on Slavic folk poetry, furthermore he translated a short fragment of Homer's Odyssey into Ukrainian. Potebnja was a corresponding member of the St. Petersburg Academy of Sciences, the foremost academic institution in the Russian Empire.

== Life and career ==
Alexander Potebnja was born into a noble family in 1835 on his family's estate in Maniv, near the village of Gavrilovka near Romny, Government of Poltava, then part of the Russian Empire, now Ukraine. He received his primary education in the Polish school of the city of Radom. He graduated from the university in 1856, served briefly a teacher of literature at a school in Kharkiv, and then in 1861 he defended his master thesis Certain characters in the Slavic folk poetry (Russian: О некоторых символах в славянской народной поэзии), before beginning to lecture at the Imperial University of Kharkiv. In the early 1860s, he was known as an active ethnographer, he took part in folklore expeditions in Poltava and Akhtyrka counties. His teachers were the brothers Pyotr Lavrov and Nikolai Lavrov and Professor Amvrosy Metlinsky. In 1862 he published his most important work Thought and Language, and in the same year he went on a trip abroad. He attended lectures at the University of Berlin, he studied Sanskrit and visited several Slavic countries.

Alexander's younger brother Andriy (Andrey) Potebnia served in the military and took part in the Polish Uprising of 1863, during which he fell in battle against Russian troops. Alexander himself was deported from Lviv by Austrian authorities due to his suspected ties with Polish rebels.

He studied law, history, and philology at the Imperial University of Kharkov (PhD in philology, 1874). In 1874 he defended his doctoral dissertation entitled Notes on Russian Grammar (Russian: Заметки о русской грамматике). In 1875, he became a professor at the Imperial University of Kharkiv. He also presided over the Kharkiv Historical-Philological Society (1877–90) and was a member of the Bohemian Society of Sciences (from 1887).

During his studies in Kharkiv, Potebnia took part in activities of the local Hromada, which led Russian press to accuse him of "Malorussian separatism".

=== Work ===
As a linguist, Potebnja specialized in four areas: the philosophy of language, the historical phonetics of the East Slavic languages, etymology, and Slavic historical syntax. His major works on the philosophy of language are Thought and Language (Russian: Мысль и язык, 5 edns, 1862, 1892, 1913, 1922, 1926); On the Relation among Some Representations in Language (Russian: О связи некоторых представлений в языке, 1864); his doctoral dissertation, From Notes on Russian Grammar (Russian: Из записок по русской грамматике, vol 1, 1874; repr 1958); and the posthumously published Language and Nationality (Russian: Язык и народность, in Vestnik Evropy, 1895).

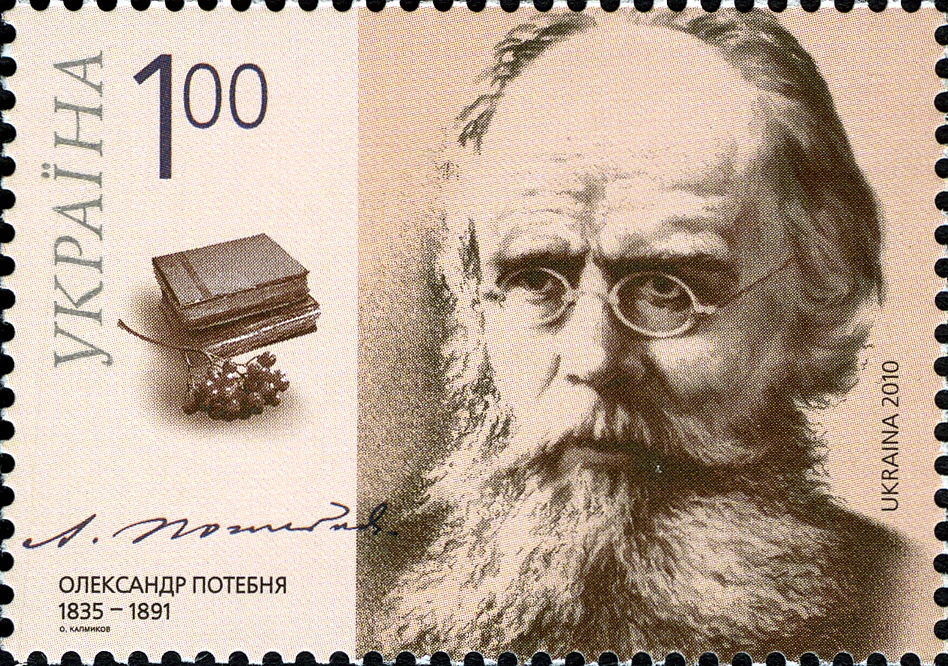
Potebnja portrayed on a 2010 Ukrainian stamp

He was particularly interested in the relations among language, thought, and reality. Language for him was primarily the means by which the mind ordered the influx of impressions and stimuli. Words carry not only a meaning, but also the past experience of the individual and the nation, through which all new experience is filtered. Thus a word usually has three aspects: an external form, a meaning, and an internal form. It is through the internal form that the objective world is subjectivized. In many cases the internal form is rooted in myth and, hence, acts as a bridge between language and folklore (with its symbols). These ideas constitute the framework of Potebnja's master's thesis, On Some Symbols in Slavic Folk Poetry (Russian: О некоторых символах в славянской народной поэзии, 1860; expanded edn 1914), and his monumental work Obiasneniia malorusskikh i srodnykh narodnykh pesen (Explanations of Little Russian and Related Folk Songs, 2 vols, 1883, 1887). With time the consciousness of a word's internal form fades, and one of the tasks of literature is to restore this consciousness. According to this theory, literature is a hierarchy of genres; the simplest ones (the proverb, riddle, and fable) directly recall or renew the word's internal form, and the other genres do so in a more complicated, sometimes hardly detectable, way through a complex system of subjective (in poetry) or seemingly objective (in the novel) images. Potebnia's principal works on this subject were published posthumously: From Lectures on the Theory of Literature: The Fable, the Adage, the Proverb (Russian: Из лекции по теории словесности. Басня, пословица, поговорка, 1894; repr 1970; Transl. into Ukrainian in 1930), From Notes on the Theory of Literature: Poetry and Prose, Tropes and Figures, Poetic and Mythical Thought (Russian: Из записок по теории словесности: Поэзия и проза, тропы и фигуры, мышление поэтическое и мифическое, приложения, Addenda, 1905; repr 1970), and Preliminary Remarks ... on L. Tolstoy and F. Dostoevsky (Russian: Черновые записки о Л. H. Толстом и Ф. М. Достоевском, in: Voprosy teorii i psikhologii tvorchestva, vol 5, 1914).

Regarding language as an individual's or a nation's only possible means of perceiving the world and of thinking, Potebnja protested vehemently against denationalization in general and the Russification of Ukrainians in particular, and equated this process with spiritual and intellectual disintegration. Potebnja's philosophy of language is rooted in Wilhelm von Humboldt's romantic idealism, but he was also influenced by J. Herbart's and Hermann Lotze's associative psychology, and particularly by Heymann Steinthal's psycholinguistic writings.

Potebnja viewed the history of a language as the history of its dialects and used the concept of phonetic law, although he often tried to find a psychological basis for the concept. He recognized the existence of a proto-Rus’ language, but located the beginning of its disintegration into dialects back in prehistoric times. He made many discoveries in Ukrainian historical phonetics, such as the primordial dž < dj alteration, the so-called second pleophony, and the conditions for the alternation e:o. He was the first to propose the theory that diphthongs were a transitional stage between Old Ruthenian o, e, and Little Russian (i.e. Modern Ukrainian) language.

As an etymologist, Potebnja paid much attention to semantic development and the history of words against an expansive historical, folkloric, and psychological background. His major etymological writings were collected in K istorii zvukov russkago iazyka (Toward a History of the Sounds in the Russian Language, vols 2–4, 1880–1, 1883). His annotations to Slovo o polku Ihorevi (1878; repr 1914) are a brilliant synthesis of the etymological, folkloristic, and historical approaches.

From the 1870s Potebnja concentrated on the study of the historical syntax of the Slavic languages against a comparative Indo-European background. His Iz zapisok po russkoi grammatike contains his writings on predicate forms and the participle (vol 2, 1874; rev edn 1888; repr 1958), the noun and the adjective (vol 3, 1899; repr 1968), and the verb and indeclinable words (vol 4, 1941; rev edn 1978). Before his work the field of Slavic historical syntax consisted mostly of inventories of constructions collected from literary monuments of various periods. He revised it to create a broadly drawn picture of category and construction changes tied to changes in ways of thinking, by integrating historical, dialectal, and folkloric materials. His comparative analysis uncovered remnants of prehistoric syntax in later constructions and reinterpretations of archaic constructions in later syntactic systems; that is, it demonstrated the historical character of syntactic categories and parts of speech. Anton Budilovich equated Potebnja's contribution to the field of historical syntax with Darwin's contribution to the study of the origin of species.

Potebnja was far ahead of his contemporaries and not very popular during his lifetime. In the field of historical syntax his only immediate followers were A. Popov and, to a certain extent, Dmitrii Ovsianiko-Kulikovsky (in his outline of Russian syntax). His ideas on literature were adopted as a theoretical framework by the ‘Kharkiv school’ (B. Lezin, Vasyl Khartsiiev, A. Gornfeld, T. Rainov, Oleksa Vetukhiv, and others) grouped around the serial Voprosy teorii i psikhologii tvorchestva (8 vols, 1907–23). They also had a significant impact on the aesthetics of the Russian Symbolists (particularly A. Bely) and an indirect influence on the Ukrainian Symbolists. In 1945 the Institute of Linguistics of the Academy of Sciences of the Ukrainian Soviet Socialist Republic (now NANU) was named after Potebnja. Collections of his works on accentology (1973) and esthetics and poetics (1976, 1985) have been published.

A foreword to Potebnia's publication Language. Nationality. Denationalization was written by fellow alumnus of Kharkiv University Yuri Sheveliov.

== Views ==
Potebnia criticized what he saw as the inability of Ukrainian intelligentsia to create its own nation. He questioned the potential of Taras Shevchenko's works to trigger a national awakening, seeing them rather as "ethnographic material". Potebnia opposed bilingualism, which he saw as a consequence of denationalization, which led him to criticize the popularity of French language among Russian aristocracy. He believed that a person's structure thinking was formed by the structure of the language spoken by that person, so adopting another language than the native one would change one's whole worldview. In this he can be seen as a forerunner of Michel Foucault.

== Family ==
Potebnia's wife Maria was a publisher's daughter from Kharkiv. Their children also became scientists: Oleksandr was electrotechnician, and his brother Andriy - a botanist and a specialist in mycology.

== See also ==
- Internal history
