= Johann Nepomuk Ehrlich =

Austrian theologian and philosopher (1810-1864)

Johann Nepomuk Ehrlich (February 21, 1810 – October 23, 1864) was an Austrian theologian and philosopher born in Vienna.

== Biography ==
Ehrlich was born in Vienna. He initially studied philosophy in Krems (1828–1829), and from 1829 to 1834 studied philosophy and theology at the University of Vienna. In 1834 he received his ordination, and from 1836 taught classes in philosophy, history and literature at the gymnasium in Krems.

In 1850 he obtained the theological doctorate in Tübingen, and during the same year was appointed professor of moral theology in Graz. Two years later he relocated to the University of Prague as a professor of moral theology, where in 1856 he became a professor of fundamental theology.

In 1827, while still a teenager, Ehrlich joined the Piarists. In 1853 he became an associate member of the Bohemian Society of Sciences.

== Works ==
- Leitfaden der Metaphysik (A guide to metaphysics), 1841
- Metaphysik als rationale Ontologie (Metaphysics as a rational ontology), 1841
- Lehre von der Bestimmung der Menschen als rationale Teleologie (Doctrine of determination of the people as rational teleology, Part 1), 1842
- Das Christentum und die Religionen des Morgenlandes (Christianity and the religions of the Eastern World), 1843
- Lehre von der Bestimmung der Menschen als rationale Teleologie (Doctrine of determination of the people as rational teleology, Part 2), 1845
- Die neuesten Vorschläge zur Reform der philosophische Ethik (The newest proposals for reform of philosophical ethics), 1847
- Briefe eines Piaristen an seine Ordensbrüder in den K. K. österreichischen Staaten (Letter from the Piarists to religious brethren in the Royal Austrian State), 1848
- Über das christlichen Prinzip der Gesellschaft (On the Christian principle of society), 1856
- Fundamentaltheologie (Fundamental Theology, 1859-1862)
- Apologetische Ergänzungen zur Fundamentaltheologie (Apologetic additions to fundamental theology, Part 1), 1863
- Lehrbuch der Logik für Gymnasien (Textbook of logic for Gymnasiums), 1863
- Apologetische Ergänzungen zu Fundamentaltheologie (Apologetic additions to fundamental theology, Part 2), 1864
- Lehrbuch der empirische Psychologie (Textbook of empirical psychology), 1864
