= Zipper (disambiguation) =

A zipper is a device for temporarily joining two edges of fabric together.

Zipper(s) may also refer to:

== Entertainment ==
- Zipper (film), a 2015 political thriller
- Zipper (ride), an amusement ride
- "Zipper" (song), by Brockhampton
- Zipper Harris, a character in the Doonesbury universe
- Zipper Interactive, a video game developer
- Zipper, a character in the Chip 'n Dale Rescue Rangers universe
- Zipper T. Bunny, a character in the Animal Crossing series
- The Zippers, a band

== Transportation ==
- Zenair Zipper, an ultralight aircraft
- Zoe Zipper, a microcar sold by Zoe Motors in the early 1980s
- Call sign for the airline Zip

== Other uses ==
- Zipper (BDSM), a sexual practice which involves "zipping" the skin
- Zipper (data structure), a technique of representing an aggregate data structure
- Zipper Creek (Alaska)
- Zipper storage bag
- .219 Zipper, a rifle cartridge made by Winchester Repeating Arms
- Barrier transfer machine or zipper machine, used for moving concrete lane dividers
- Herbert Zipper (1904–1997), Austrian composer, conductor and arts activist
  - Zipper Hall, a music venue on the campus of the Colburn School in Los Angeles, California
- Operation Zipper, a Second World War British plan
- Another name for a news ticker

== See also ==
- Zip (disambiguation)
- Zipp (disambiguation)
- Zippy (disambiguation)
- Zipping (horse), an Australian champion racehorse
