= Saparov =

Saparov or Saparow, feminine: Saparova / Saparowa, is a patronymic surname derived from the given name Sapar (Safar); a variant of Safarov. Notable people with the surname include:

- Aidarbek Saparov, Kazakhstani politician
- Mako Saparova-Abashidze (1860–1940), Georgian actress
- Mekan Saparow, Turkmenistani footballer
- Rustam Saparov, Turkmenistani footballer
