= Saffar (surname) =

Saffar (from Arabic saffār صَفَّار 'coppersmith') is a surname. Notable people with the name include:

- Ibn as-Saffar (died 1035), Arab Andalusian astronomer
- Ayesha Saffar (1078–1153), Iranian Muslim woman narrator
- Ammar al-Saffar(born 1956, abducted 2006), Deputy Health Minister of Iraq
- Hassan al-Saffar (born 1958), Shi'a scholar from Qatif, Saudi Arabia
- Hossein Saffar Harandi (born 1953), Minister of Culture and Islamic Guidance of Iran until 26 July 2009
- Jamal Al-Saffar (born 1971), Saudi Arabian sprinter who specialized in the 100 metres
- Saeed-Al-Saffar (born 1968), cricketer who has represented the UAE at international level
- Yoav Saffar (born 1975), Israeli basketball player

== See also ==
- Safar (surname)
