= Šafář =

Šafář (Czech pronunciation: [ˈʃafaːr̝̊]) is a surname, found in Czech Republic. The female counterpart surname is Šafářová (Czech pronunciation: [ˈʃafaːr̝ovaː]). The word originally meant "bailiff". People with this surname include:

- Alena Šafářová (born 1968), Czech table tennis player
- Lucie Šafářová (born 1987), Czech former professional tennis player
- Zdeněk Šafář (born 1978), Czech freestyle skier

== See also ==
- Safar (surname), a surname of multiple etymologies
- Sáfár, a Hungarian surname
- Šafařík, a Czech surname
