= Stephen Sáfár =

Hungarian diplomat and soldier

Stephen (I) Sáfár

Ispán of Pilis
- Reign: 1318–1345
- Predecessor: Eyza (eventually, in 1285)
- Successor: Töttös Becsei
- Born: 1280s
- Died: 1345
- Noble family: House of Sáfár
- Issue: Margaret; Anne; Nicholas I John I (?) Helena
- Father: Paul

Stephen Sáfár de Csév (Hungarian: csévi Sáfár István; 1280s–1345) was a Hungarian diplomat, soldier and noble in the first half of the 14th century, a loyal supporter of Charles I of Hungary and his consolidation efforts. In this regard, Stephen served as ispán of Pilis County and castellan of Visegrád Castle, simultaneously from 1318 until his death.

== Origin ==
His origin and family background remain unknown. According to a royal charter from 1338, his father was a certain Paul. As a document issued on 30 August 1326 noted, Stephen "arrived to the realm along with the king [Charles]", while another charter (dated 29 January 1327) suggested Stephen served Charles immediately after the king's arrival in late 1300. Thus it is possible that Stephen of foreign origin accompanied the twelve-year-old Charles from Naples to Hungary. This assumption is confirmed by the fact that Stephen served as envoy of Charles to foreign lands at least nine times by 1326, which assumed he was fluent in French and Italian.

Based on land donations and inheritance contracts in the decades of the 14th century between Stephen and his familials, historian Krisztina Tóth suggested he originated from a lesser noble family which gained their first lands and villages in Požega County during the reign of Ladislaus IV. Following the end of the Mongol invasion of Hungary, Béla IV donated the entire territory to his wife Maria Laskarina thus Požega County became a permanent queenly estate. In 1281, Queen Dowager Elizabeth donated the villages Alsókamarica and Berzince to her courtly youths, brothers Ambrose and Leonard of Požega, respectively. When Ladislaus IV was killed in 1290, his sister Mary, Queen of Naples announced her claim to Hungary. She transferred her claim to his firstborn son, Charles Martel in January 1292. Among others, several Slavonian noble families acknowledged his claim against Andrew III. Many of them left for Naples alongside Charles Martel after his failure. Tóth assumed Paul, Stephen's father was one of them. As Stephen performed diplomatic duties already in the 1310s, it is presumable that he was born in the 1280s as a contemporary of Charles Martel's son, Charles, who raised as claimant to the Hungarian throne, surrounding himself with Hungarian tutors, pages and courtiers. Accordingly, Stephen learnt Italian and French languages in the Neapolitan royal court, which explains his high degree of language proficiency, despite his social status of lesser nobility.

== Career ==
Stephen was a member of several diplomatic missions to Naples and the Roman Curia since the 1300s, for instance in 1301, 1303, 1304 and 1309. For his role, he was made castellan of Toppay near the confluence of rivers Tisza and Maros (Mureș) ("Toppay" possibly refers to Tápé Castle in Szeged). Stephen functioned as interpreter in that delegation, which was sent to Prague and Zbraslav led by Thomas Szécsényi and Simon Kacsics on 18–23 January 1318 in order to find a bride for Charles, whose previous (first or second) wife Maria of Bytom, had died in 1317. According to the report, John of Bohemia called his two sisters to his court and the Bohemian king gave the envoys the opportunity to choose between them their future queen. Following that Beatrice parted with the Hungarian entourage to her new home. Stephen received his first land donation (the unidentified Hvhíz) for this role in that year.

After defeating the Borsa clan in Transtisia, Charles I waged war against another oligarch Matthew Csák and captured Komárom (now Komárno in Slovakia) and Visegrád in autumn 1317. In the next year the king expanded the estate with surrounding lands (e.g. Szentendre was received from Stephen Kéki, the Bishop of Veszprém in exchange for domains in Zala County). Although Stephen was first mentioned as castellan of Visegrád by a royal charter on 20 January 1321, he was already referred to as Stephen of Visegrád in contemporary records since 1318, proving that he held the office since that year, immediately after the reorganization of the castle into a royal estate. Beside that Stephen also served as ispán of Pilis County as both functions were connected together at least from 1258. In the first half of 1323, Charles decided to move his capital from Temesvár (today Timișoara in Romania) to Visegrád, which laid in the centre of his kingdom. The Holy Crown and the coronation insignia were kept in Visegrád thereafter too. Since that Stephen became steward of the royal court affairs. His nickname "Sáfár" (lit. "steward"), which later became the surname of his family, appeared in documents from 1343 and indicated his role as castellan of the royal capital Visegrád.

Also referred to as magister, Stephen belonged to the courtly knights. He owned a house in Visegrád from where his treasury was robbed in 1339. As a result, Charles compensated with land donations worth of 25 silver ducats. Stephen was also involved in the royal chancellery. In 1337, he participated in a Pecheneg land donation in Somogy County, bearing the title relator. It is also possible that he served as Keeper of the Seals since the 1330s. Possibly he also served as castellan of Óbuda from 1340 or 1341, replacing William Drugeth.

As his ancient lands (mainly a part of Alsókamarica) laid in Požega County, he gained donations primarily there, including the rest of Alsókamarica. In 1333, Charles confiscated the surrounding domain of Koprivnica from the disgraced Záh kindred and handed over to Stephen Sáfár. Following that Stephen purchased the land Felsőkapronca as part of an endeavor to holding concentration in the Trans-Drava region. After the death of Charles, Queen Mother Elizabeth confirmed his received land donations and granted privilege of tax exemption, including marturina which was traditionally collected in the then highly valued marten skins in Slavonia. Stephen also acquired estates in Bács and Torontál Counties, as well as in the surrounding countryside of Visegrád (including Diósd and Nyírmál). On 15 September 1326, the childless Mikócsa Rosd, a former familiaris to Matthew Csák, adopted Stephen as his son and made him as his heir. Accordingly, among others, Stephen inherited Csév (today Piliscsév) in 1334 and used "csévi" title of nobility since then. Stephen had real properties in Esztergom and Buda too.

== Family ==
Stephen had four or five children from his unidentified spouse, who survived him. His eldest son Nicholas I who married into the powerful Aba clan, served as castellan of Gönc and Regéc forts from 1371 to 1375. Following that he simultaneously held the offices of ispán of Borsod and Nógrád Counties between 1376 and 1384. Beside that he also served as castellan of Diósgyőr and Dédes Castles, both were part of the honour to the dignity of Borsod ispánate. His another son John I remained manager of the land property in Bács County, frequently referred to as "John of Szentendre" in 1367 and 1379 documents.

One of his daughters Margaret married Thomas Gönyűi, who served as Voivode of Transylvania and Master of the doorkeepers in the 1350s. Anne married Stephen Ibrányi, son of Györk from Valkó County. After his death (c. 1345) she became the wife of John Zsámboki, the brother of future Palatine Nicholas Zsámboki. It is possible that Helena who married Ákos Mikcsfi, Ban of Slavonia was also Stephen's daughter.

His grandsons, Nicholas II and John II rebelled against the rule of Sigismund of Luxemburg and were declared "treacherous" in 1405. As a result, Sigismund confiscated their domains. Gaining pardon later, Nicholas and John was able to recover a portion of their property but gradually impoverished and forced to mortgage their inherited estates. After that the Sáfár family effectively lost all political influence and died out in 1455.

== Sources ==
- Engel, Pál (1988). "Az ország újraegyesítése. I. Károly küzdelmei az oligarchák ellen (1310–1323) [Reunification of the Realm. The Struggles of Charles I Against the Oligarchs (1310–1323)]". Századok (in Hungarian). 122 (1–2). Magyar Történelmi Társulat: 89–146. ISSN 0039-8098.
- Engel, Pál (1996). Magyarország világi archontológiája, 1301–1457, I. [Secular Archontology of Hungary, 1301–1457, Volume I] (in Hungarian). História, MTA Történettudományi Intézete. ISBN 963-8312-44-0.
- Tóth, Krisztina (2009). "Károly Róbert diplomatája: István visegrádi várnagy [A Diplomat of Charles Robert: Stephen, the Castellan of Visegrád]". In Körmendi, Tamás; Thoroczkay, Gábor (eds.). Auxilium Historiae. Tanulmányok a hetvenesztendős Bertényi Iván tiszteletére (in Hungarian). Faculty of Arts, Eötvös Loránd University. pp. 365–375. ISBN 978-963-284-105-2.

Stephen I House of Sáfár Born: 1280s Died: 1345
Political offices
Preceded by Eyza (?)	Ispán of Pilis; 1318–1345	Succeeded by Töttös Becsei
Preceded by Lawrence	Castellan of Visegrád; 1318–1345	Succeeded by Töttös Becsei
