= Zipp (disambiguation) =

Zipp is a bicycle parts manufacturer.

Zipp may also refer to:

- Zipp! (musical), a West End musical revue
- Zip (roller coaster), a roller coaster at Oaks Amusement Park sometimes spelled "Zipp"

== People with the surname ==
- Bettina Zipp (born 1972), German former sprinter
- Robbie Zipp (born 1963), American soccer player
- Thomas Zipp (1966–2026), German artist
- Zipp., taxonomic author abbreviation for Alexander Zippelius (1797–1828), Dutch horticulturalist

== Fictional characters ==
- Zipp Storm, a main character in the fifth generation of My Little Pony

== See also ==
- Zip (disambiguation)
- Zippe, a surname (and list of people with that name)
- Zipper (disambiguation)
- Zippy (disambiguation)
