= Šafařík =

Šafařík (feminine: Šafaříková) in a Czech surname. Šafárik (feminine: Šafáriková) in a Slovak surname. Notable people with the surname include:

- Michal Šafařík (1977–2020), Czech ice hockey player
- Pavel Jozef Šafárik (1795–1861), Slovak philologist, poet, Slavist and historian
- Vojtěch Šafařík (1829–1902), Czech chemist

== See also ==
- Šafář
- 8336 Šafařík, a main belt asteroid
- Šafařík (crater), a crater on the Moon
