= Ottavio Assarotti =

Italian philanthropist

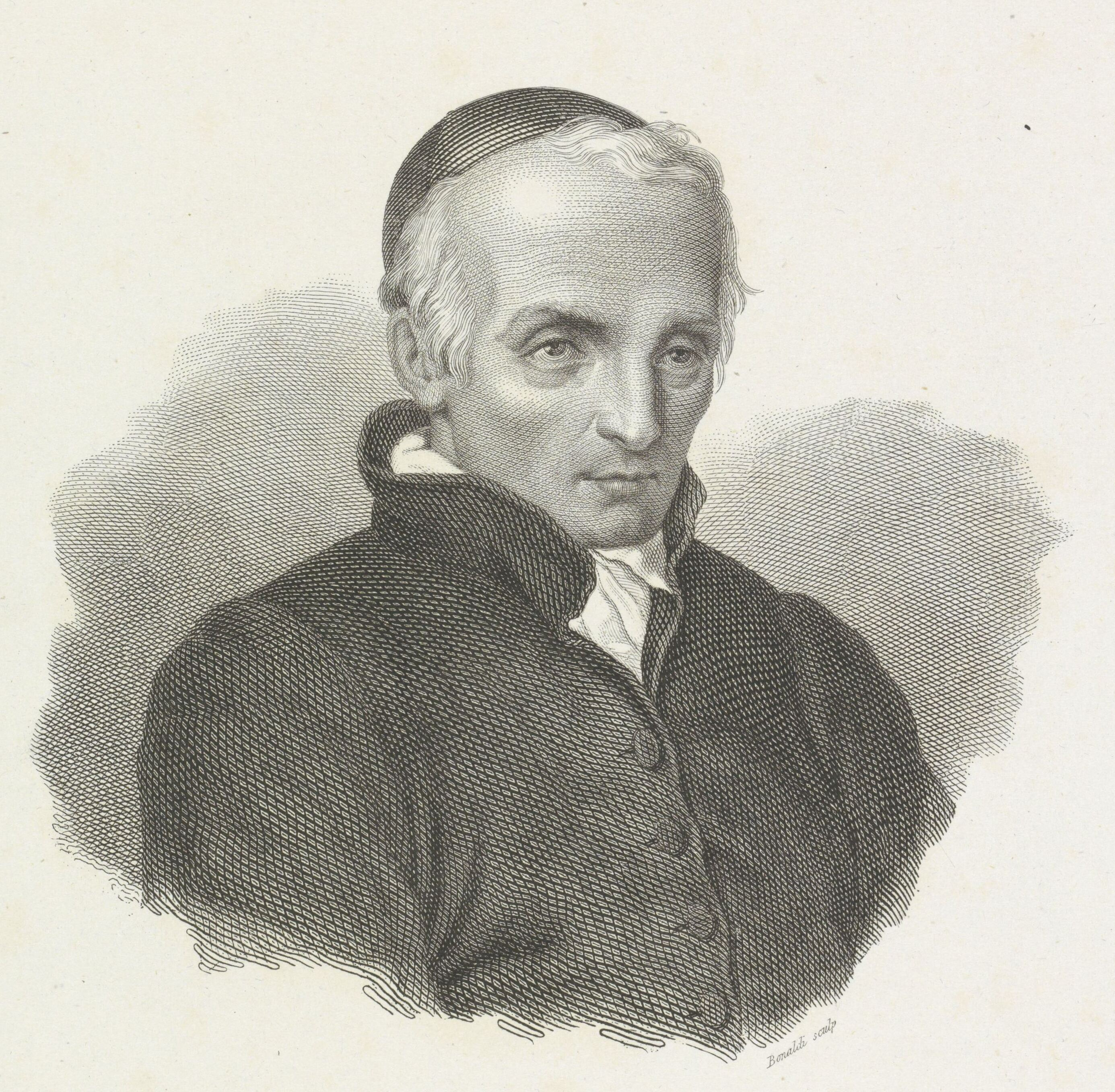
- Ottavio Assarotti
- Born: 25 October 1753; Genoa
- Died: 24 January 1829 (aged 75)
- Occupation: philanthropist
- Notable work: methodical signing, and school for deaf people in Italy

Ottavio Giovanni Battista Assarotti (25 October 1753, in Genoa – 24 January 1829) was an Italian philanthropist and founder of the first school for deaf people in Italy.

== Life ==
After qualifying himself for the church, he entered the society of the Piarists, Padri of the "Scuole Pie", who devoted themselves to the training of the young. In 1801 he heard of the Abbe Sicard's education of deaf people in Paris, and resolved to do something similar in Italy. He began with one pupil, and by degrees collected a small number around him.

In 1805, Napoleon, hearing of his endeavors, ordered a convent to give him a school-house and funds for supporting twelve scholars, to be taken from the convent revenues. This order was poorly attended to until 1811, when it was renewed, and the following year Assarotti, with a considerable number of pupils, took possession of the new school. He continued there until his death in 1829. A pension, which had been awarded him by the king of Sardinia, was bequeathed to his scholars.

He introduced a version of methodical signing.
