= Nicholas Sáfár =

Hungarian nobleman

Nicholas (I) Sáfár

Ispán of Borsod
- Reign: 1376–1384
- Predecessor: Ladislaus Pósa
- Successor: Nicholas Perényi
- Died: after 1384
- Noble family: House of Sáfár
- Spouse: N Domoszlói
- Issue: Nicholas II; John II; Sigismund; Dorothea I
- Father: Stephen I

Nicholas (I) Sáfár de Csév (Hungarian: csévi Sáfár (I) Miklós; died after 1384) was a Hungarian nobleman who held secular positions during the reign of Louis I of Hungary.

== Career ==
Nicholas I was born into the Sáfár family as the son of Stephen I the Sáfár ("steward"), a prominent diplomat of Charles I of Hungary since the 1310s. Nicholas had a brother John I and two (or three) sisters. During his father's death in 1345, Nicholas and John were possibly still minors as their unidentified mother represented them before Louis I on the occasion of a confirmation request of their land donations in 1347. Nicholas Sáfár have gained in social status when married an unidentified daughter of Stephen Domoszlói, who originated from the gens (clan) Aba.

Due to his marriage, Sáfár served as castellan of Gönc and Regéc forts from 1371 to 1375, both ancient estates of the Aba kinship, which then belonged to the royal crown. Following that he simultaneously held the offices of ispán of Borsod and Nógrád Counties between 1376 and 1384. Beside that he also served as castellan of Diósgyőr and Dédes Castles, both were part of the honour to the dignity of Borsod ispánate.

Nicholas Sáfár and his spouse had four children. Two of their sons, Nicholas II and John II rebelled against the rule of Sigismund of Luxemburg and were declared "treacherous" in 1405. As a result Sigismund confiscated their domains. Gaining pardon later, Nicholas and John was able to recover a portion of their property but gradually impoverished and forced to mortgage their inherited estates. Nicholas I's only daughter Dorothea I married Paul Perényi from the Rihnó branch, who acquired most of the Sáfár estates from his brothers-in-law.

== Sources ==
- Engel, Pál (1996). Magyarország világi archontológiája, 1301–1457, I. [Secular Archontology of Hungary, 1301–1457, Volume I] (in Hungarian). História, MTA Történettudományi Intézete. ISBN 963-8312-44-0.
- Tóth, Krisztina (2009). "Károly Róbert diplomatája: István visegrádi várnagy [A Diplomat of Charles Robert: Stephen, the Castellan of Visegrád]". In Körmendi, Tamás; Thoroczkay, Gábor (eds.). Auxilium Historiae. Tanulmányok a hetvenesztendős Bertényi Iván tiszteletére (in Hungarian). Faculty of Arts, Eötvös Loránd University. pp. 365–375. ISBN 978-963-284-105-2.

Nicholas I House of Sáfár Born: ? Died: after 1384
Political offices
Preceded by Ladislaus Pósa	Ispán of Borsod; 1376–1384	Succeeded by Nicholas Perényi
Preceded by John Zsámboki	Ispán of Nógrád; 1376–1384	Succeeded by Frank Szécsényi
