= Sáfár family =

Hungarian noble family

House of Sáfár
- Country: Kingdom of Hungary
- Founded: 1318
- Founder: Stephen I
- Final ruler: Ladislaus II
- Dissolution: 1455

The Sáfár de Csév (Hungarian: csévi Sáfár) was a Hungarian noble family from the early 14th century until the middle of the 15th century.

== History ==
The first member of the family was Stephen I, a well-trained diplomat of Charles I of Hungary since the 1300s, who was fluent in French and Italian, despite his commoner or lower noble status. A royal charter from 1326 writes Stephen "arrived to the realm along with the king [Charles]", while another charter dated 1327 suggested Stephen served Charles immediately after the king's arrival in late 1300. Based on certain land donations, historian Krisztina Tóth considered Stephen originated from a lesser noble family which gained their first lands and villages in Požega County during the reign of Ladislaus IV. Accordingly, Stephen's father Paul supported Charles Martel and acknowledged his claim to the Hungarian throne against Andrew III. After the failure, this Paul might be one of those lords who followed Charles Martel to Naples. According to this theory, Stephen raised in the Neapolitan court as Martel's son Charles surrounded himself with Hungarian tutors, pages and courtiers.

Returning Hungary, Stephen was a member of several diplomatic missions to Naples and the Roman Curia. Following the recapture of Visegrád in autumn 1317, Stephen was appointed its castellan. In 1323, Charles selected Visegrád as the new capital of the kingdom. Since that Stephen became steward of the royal court affairs as castellan of Visegrád. His nickname "Sáfár" (lit. "steward"), which later became the surname of his family, first documented appearance from 1343. Stephen gained his first land donations in 1318, (re)promoting to the Hungarian nobility.

Stephen had four or five children: his daughters married to influential barons who held national dignities during the rule of Louis I of Hungary. His elder son Nicholas I served as castellan of Gönc and Regéc forts from 1371 to 1375. Following that he simultaneously held the offices of ispán of Borsod and Nógrád Counties between 1376 and 1384. Beside that he also served as castellan of Diósgyőr and Dédes Castles, both were part of the honour to the dignity of Borsod ispánate.

The family lost its all political influence, when Nicholas I's two sons, Nicholas II and John II rebelled against the rule of Sigismund of Luxemburg and were declared "treacherous" in 1405. As a result, Sigismund confiscated their domains. Gaining pardon later, Nicholas and John was able to recover a portion of their property but gradually impoverished and forced to mortgage their inherited estates. Nicholas I's only daughter Dorothea I married Paul Perényi from the Rihnó branch, who acquired most of the Sáfár estates from his brothers-in-law. After four generations, the Sáfár family became extinct, when Ladislaus II, the last male member of the family died without heirs in 1455.

== Family tree ==
- Stephen I (fl. 1321–45) the Sáfár (lit. "steward"), ispán of Pilis County and castellan of Visegrád
  - Margaret (fl. 1343–44), married Thomas Gönyűi
  - Anne (fl. 1348), married Stephen Ibrányi, then John Zsámboki
  - Nicholas I (fl. 1366–84), castellan of Gönc and Regéc, ispán of Borsod and Nógrád Counties
    - Nicholas II (fl. 1389–1419)
      - Ladislaus II (fl. 1414–55), last male member
      - Catherine (fl. 1414–18)
      - Ursula (fl. 1414–18)
      - Dorothea II (fl. 1415)
    - John II (fl. 1389–1419, died before 1421)
    - Sigismund (fl. 1389)
    - Dorothea I (fl. 1409–15), married Paul Perényi
  - John I (fl. 1366–79)
    - Francis (fl. 1377)
    - Ladislaus I (fl. 1389)
    - Stephen II (fl. 1389–1405)
  - (?) Helena (fl. 1390–92), married Ákos Mikcsfi

== Sources ==
- Engel, Pál (1996). Magyarország világi archontológiája, 1301–1457, I. [Secular Archontology of Hungary, 1301–1457, Volume I] (in Hungarian). História, MTA Történettudományi Intézete. ISBN 963-8312-44-0.
- Tóth, Krisztina (2009). "Károly Róbert diplomatája: István visegrádi várnagy [A Diplomat of Charles Robert: Stephen, the Castellan of Visegrád]". In Körmendi, Tamás; Thoroczkay, Gábor (eds.). Auxilium Historiae. Tanulmányok a hetvenesztendős Bertényi Iván tiszteletére (in Hungarian). Faculty of Arts, Eötvös Loránd University. pp. 365–375. ISBN 978-963-284-105-2.
