= Safar (surname) =

Safar (from Arabic saffār صَفَّار 'coppersmith', from Czech Šafář (Czech pronunciation: [ˈʃafaːr̝̊]) or from Hungarian Sáfár (Hungarian pronunciation: [ˈʃaːfaːr])) is a surname. Notable people with the name include:

- Athanasius Safar, Syriac Catholic bishop of Mardin
- Hanne Safar (died 1915), Syriac Orthodox leader in Midyat
- Hussain Safar, Kuwaiti judoka
- Iuliu Safar, Romanian futsal player
- Khvajeh Safar, Safavid official
- Peter Safar (1924–2003), Austrian physician and inventor
- Selem Safar, Syrian-Argentine basketball player
- Yousef Ahmed Safar, Emirati footballer

== See also ==
- Saffar (surname)
- Safarov
