= Zippy =

Zippy refer to:

== People ==
- Greg Zipadelli (born 1967), nickname for the NASCAR crew chief
- Stuart Langridge, author and programmer nicknamed Zippy
- Tzipi Livni, an Israeli politician and former minister of foreign affairs

== Fictional characters ==
- Mr. ZIP, informally Zippy, a cartoon character used by the U.S. Postal Service
- Zippy (mascot), the name of the mascot for the University of Akron Zips
- Zippy (Rainbow), a character in Rainbow, a British pre-school children's television series
- Zippy the Pinhead, the main character in a comic strip of the same name

== Other uses ==
- Zipair Tokyo (callsign code: ZIPPY), a low-cost Japanese airline
- Zippy Race, a motorbike-driving arcade game
- Zippy Water Heaters, a colloquial name for Zip Instant Boiling Water taps made by Zip Industries
- Zippy, a former name of the data compression library Snappy

== See also ==
- Zip (disambiguation)
- Zipp (disambiguation)
