= Piarists =

Religious order

Order of Poor Clerics Regular of the Mother of God of the Pious Schools
- Latin: Ordo Clericorum Regularium Pauperum Matris Dei Scholarum Piarum
- Abbreviation: SchP, SP
- Nickname: Piarists
- Formation: 25 March March 25, 1617 (409 years ago)
- Founder: Saint Fr. Joseph Calasanz, Sch. P.
- Type: Catholic religious & Mendicant order of Clerics Regular of pontifical right
- Headquarters: Piazza dei Massimi, 4, Rome, Italy
- Coordinates: 41°53′50.5″N 12°28′24.33″E
- Members: 1,356 members (includes 945 priests) as of 2020
- Superior General: Fr. Pedro Aguado Cuesta, SchP
- Parent organization: Catholic Church
- Website: scolopi.org

The Piarists (/ˈpaɪərɪsts/), officially named the Order of Poor Clerics Regular of the Mother of God of the Pious Schools (Latin: Ordo Clericorum Regularium Pauperum Matris Dei Scholarum Piarum), abbreviated SchP, is a religious order of clerics regular of the Catholic Church founded in 1617 by Spanish priest Joseph Calasanz. It is the oldest religious order dedicated to education, and the main occupation of the Piarist fathers is teaching children and youth, the primary goal being to provide free education for poor children. The Piarist practice was to become a model for numerous later Catholic societies devoted to teaching, while some state-supported public school systems in Europe also followed their example. The Piarists have had a considerable success in the education of physically or mentally disabled persons. Notable individuals who have taught at Piarist schools include Pope Pius IX, Goya, Schubert, Gregor Mendel, Tadeusz Kościuszko, and Victor Hugo.

== History ==
=== Joseph Calasanz ===
Joseph Calasanz, a native of Peralta de la Sal in the Spanish province of Huesca in Aragon, was born on 11 September 1557. The youngest of eight children, he studied at Lleida and Alcalá, and after his ordination to the priesthood on 17 December 1583 by the Bishop of Urgel he moved to Rome (1592) where he organised, in 1607, a brotherhood. In November 1597, he opened the first free public school in Europe at Santa Dorotea. While it was considered a school of the Confraternity of Christian Doctrine, it was unique from the 22 other schools of the Confraternity, which just taught Catechism classes. The school opened by Calasanz also taught secular subjects. The Pious Schools expanded and were financially supported by Popes Clement VIII (r. 1592–1605) and Paul V (r. 1605–1621).

On 6 March 1617, the Piarist Fathers became an independent congregation called the "Pauline Congregation of the Poor of the Mother of God of the Pious Schools" when Pope Paul V issued his brief "Ad ea per quae". On 25 March 1617, Calasanz and fourteen other priests became the first members of the new community when they received the religious habit. Calasanz was placed in charge of the new congregation, and he changed his name to "Joseph of the Mother of God", thus inaugurating the practice of dropping the family name on entering the religious life. The new congregation was the first religious institute dedicated to teaching. To the three usual vows of poverty, chastity, and obedience, the new congregation added a fourth vow, that of dedication to the Christian education of youth, especially of the poor.

Soon the Pious Schools began to expand outside of Rome. In June 1616, Calasanz opened a foundation of the Pious Schools at Tusculum (Italian: Tuscolo) in the summer resort of Frascati. The school, which is still in operation, opened in August 1616, and Calasanz brought to it a painting of the Mother of God, Our Lady of Grace. He then opened schools in Narni (1618), which is located 43 miles (70 Kilometers) from Rome and is where he completed writing his Constitutions, Moricone (1619), Magliano (1620), and Norcia, Carcare, and Fonano (all 1621).

The congregation received papal approval on 18 November 1621 by a brief of Pope Gregory XV, under the name of Congregatio Clericorum Regularium Pauperum Matris Dei Scholarum Piarum. The term "Pauline" was omitted by this pope, although it had been part of the original name due to Pope Paul V. Gregory XV approved the constitutions on 31 January 1622, and the Piarists received all the privileges of the mendicant orders, with Calasanz recognised as general superior, his four assistants being Blessed Pietro Casani, Viviano Vivani, Francesco Castelli and Paolo Ottonelli. On 7 May of the same year the novitiate of St. Onofrio opened.

The Order began growing rapidly. It soon expanded into Liguria, and between 1621 and 1632, established schools at Carcare, Savona, two at Genoa, and a short-lived one at Carmagnola. The first Piarist province was established in 1623 in Liguria. The Roman Province would be formally established in 1626. Meanwhile, in Rome, Cardinal Tonti (1566–1622), the titular Archbishop of Nazareth, bequeathed a property to St. Joseph, which opened in 1630 with 8 students as Collegio Nazareno. It soon became the flagship school of the Pious Schools in Rome. There was a failed attempt in 1625 to establish schools in Naples, but after another attempt, the province of Naples would be established in 1627. Between 1630 and 1641), several schools were opened in Tuscany. They were closed briefly following an outbreak of the plague, but they were soon reopened, and Tuscany would become a province in 1630. One of the most famous of these schools was the school at Abacus, which emphasised mathematics and science. It also offered an Algebra course for adults, and it opened a School for Nobles. The four Italian provinces were to merge into a single Italian Province in 2007.

Outside Italy, the Pious schools expanded into Central Europe. Cardinal Dietrichstein invited the Pious Schools to come to Moravia, which is now part of the Czech Republic. On 2 April 1631, the Laurentine School was opened in Nikolsburg (Mikulov) with eight teachers and nine students. Within a week the number of students increased to sixteen, and within a month there were over 100 students. In 1634, a novitiate was opened in Lipník nad Bečvou, and in 1640 a school was opened in Litomyšl in Bohemia. The first Piarist province established outside of Italy was the province of Bohemia and Moravia, which was established in 1634. Jerzy Ossoliński was instrumental in bringing the Pious Schools into Poland and Hungary, which soon became the countries with the two largest number of Piarist Foundations in Central Europe, with 28 foundations in Poland and 29 in Hungary. In 1642, King Ladislaus IV invited the Pious Schools to establish a foundation in Warsaw, followed by a school in Podolinec. The Piarist Province of Germany and Poland was established in 1642. Prince Stanisław Lubomirski introduced the Order into Poland, and he is considered the creator of the province of Hungary, which came about from the school in Podolinec, located on the boundary line with Poland. The first Piarist school was opened in Hungary in 1642.

The Pious Schools next expanded to the two major islands off the coast of Italy where they opened houses in Palermo and Messina in Sicily and then opened two houses at Cagliari in Sardinia. There was one attempt to open a house in the homeland of the founder during his lifetime. In 1637, the order tried to open a house in Guissona in Spain, but the first actual house to open in Spain opened forty years later, in 1677, in Barbastro. The first Spanish province was the province of Aragon, which was established in 1742. The Province of Catalonia was established in 1751, as was the province of Austria. Three more provinces would be added in Spain, one in each of the next three centuries: Castile (1753), Valencia (1833), and Vasconia (1933). Added to them was the General Delegation of Spain in 1929.

The pedagogical ideal of Calasanz of educating every child, his schools for the poor, his support of the heliocentric sciences of Galileo Galilei, the scandals and persecutions of some of his detractors, and his life of sanctity in the service of children and youth, carried with them the opposition of many among the governing classes in society and in the ecclesiastical hierarchy. In 1642, as a result of an internal crisis in the Order and outside intrigues and pressures, Calasanz was briefly held and interrogated by the Inquisition. According to Karen Liebreich, problems were exacerbated by Father Stefano Cherubini, originally headmaster of the Piarist school in Naples who sexually abused the pupils in his care. Father Stefano made no secret about at least some of his transgressions, and Calasanz came to know of them. Unfortunately for Calasanz as administrator of the order, Cherubini was the son and the brother of powerful papal lawyers; no one wanted to offend the Cherubini family. Cherubini pointed out that if allegations of his abuse of his boys became public, actions would be taken to destroy the Piarists. Calasanz, therefore, promoted Cherubini, to get him away from the scene of the crime, citing as the motive only his luxurious diet and failure to attend prayers. However, he knew what Cherubini had really been up to, and he wrote that the sole aim of the plan "... is to cover up this great shame in order that it does not come to the notice of our superiors."

Superiors in Rome may have suspected, but it seems that they also bowed to the same family ties that had bound Calasanz. Cherubini became visitor-general for the Piarists, able to conduct himself just as he wanted in any school he visited. The Piarists became entangled in Church politics, and partially because they were associated with Galileo, were opposed by the Jesuits. (Galileo's views also involved atomism, and was thought to have heretical ramifications regarding transubstantiation.) The support for Cherubini was broad enough that in 1643, he was made the head of the order and the elderly Calasanz was pushed aside. Upon this appointment, Calasanz publicly documented Cherubini's long pattern of child molestation, a pattern that he had known about for years. Even this did not block Cherubini's appointment, but other members of the order were indignant about it, although they may have objected to Cherubini's more overt shortcomings. With such dissension, the Holy See took the easy course of suppressing the order. In 1646, the order was deprived of its privileges by Pope Innocent X, but the order was restored ten years later by Pope Alexander VII (r. 1655–1667).

Joseph Calasanz, died on 25 August 1648. Beatified in 1748 and canonised in 1767, he was declared "Universal Patron of all the Christian popular schools in the world" by Pope Pius XII in 1948, because he had the glory of opening "the first free tuition, popular, public school in Europe" and had proclaimed the right to education of all children, fought for it, and was persecuted because of this.

=== Expansion of the order ===
The Piarists first established a community outside the continent of Europe in 1767 when the Piarist Father Basilio Sancho was appointed as the 17th Archbishop of Manila in 1765, having been recommended for the position by King Charles III. Sancho and four other Piarists arrived in Manila in March 1767. The four other Piarists helped Sancho plan the First Provincial Synod of Manila. Sancho established a diocesan seminary in which the first native diocesan priests were trained. The Piarists worked in the seminary as well as at St. Joseph's School, which had previously been run by the Jesuits. Following Sancho's death in 1787, the Piarists returned to Spain. They wouldn't return to the Philippines until 1995, and they now have communities on the islands of Luzon, Cebu, and Mindanao.

Two attempts were made to establish a Piarist presence in the Caribbean in the 19th century. Following the Spanish War of Independence, which ended in 1812, many Piarists left Spain and went to Cuba, where they worked in various ministries. Bishop Anthony M. Claret asked the Piarists to establish a college for the formation of Cuban teachers in Guanabacoa, and the first canonical foundation established in the Americas was in Cuba in 1857. In 1941, the first Piarist Cuban novitiate was opened in Guanabacoa, all previous Cuban novices having gone to Spain for their novitiate. In 1897, the Piarists established the first teacher's college in Puerto Rico in Santurce, but the fathers returned to Spain following the Spanish–American War. The Piarists would return to Puerto Rico in June 1956 to work at Our Lady of Montserrat parish in Salinas and at The Catholic University of Puerto Rico in 1960. The parish was quite large with 20,000 parishioners, and after the Piarists left the parish in 1961, eight Piarists began teaching Cuban refugee children. The Provincial Delegation of New York and Puerto Rico was erected on 30 August 1960, and the House of Ponce was canonically established on 26 November 1960. The Piarists opened a community in San Juan in 1966.

Meanwhile, the Piarists from Spain began establishing communities throughout Central and South America, establishing vice-provinces in Colombia (1956), Brasil (1958), Central America (1960), Chile (1960), and Venezuela (1960). The first Piarist Province in the Americas was established in 1964 in Argentina, which was followed by the establishment of the Piarist Province of the United States (1975) and Mexico (1990). The Piarists established a presence in Bolivia in 1992, which became a Vicariate in 2007. In 2017, the Piarists opened a House in Peru.

The Piarists established their first school in the United States in New Orleans in the early 20th century, but it did not last long. They would try again in New Orleans in 1963, but after one year they departed. It would not be until the beginning of World War II that they would succeed in establishing a foundation in the United States. In the summer of 1940, a Spanish Piarist, Fr. Enrique Pobla went to Los Angeles to examine the possibilities for a foundation. In October 1944, Archbishop John Cantwell of Los Angeles offered the Piarists the care of St. Martha Parish in Vernon, and Fr. Pobla celebrated his first Mass at the parish on the Saturday before the Solemnity of Christ the King. In May 1947, the Piarists were offered the care of Our Lady of Guadalupe Parish in Pasadena, and in 1951, the Archbishop entrusted to them Mary Help of Christians Parish in east Los Angeles. The rectory was too small, so in 1953, they purchased a house near the parish for $15,500. It was the first property owned by the Piarists in California. In 1955, Fr. Angel Torra became the first Piarist assigned to teach at a diocesan high school. In 1960, Cardinal McIntyre entrusted them with St. Bernard High School in Playa del Rey.

Following the second world war, Piarists from eastern Europe were sent to the United States, with the first four arriving in Los Angeles in 1949, but the archbishop said that he did not have work for them to do since they could not speak English well. Meanwhile, Bishop John O'Hara of Buffalo was contacted by two different Piarists and said that he would welcome the Piarists into his diocese. Father Joseph Batori arrived in New York City on 16 June 1949, and after a couple of days left for Lackawanna, where there were many Hungarian refugees living in the area. He was assigned to St. Thomas Aquinas Parish, where he celebrated daily Mass and assisted on weekends, and he taught Latin at Bishop Timon, a diocesan high school. More Hungarian Piarists soon arrived, and after the summer of 1950, Bishop O'Hara offered the Piarists the use of a farmhouse in Lackawanna. By the end of the year, there were eleven Piarists (nine from Hungary and two from Poland) living in the farmhouse as a community, and they called themselves "The Founding Fathers." Father Batori found a house that he liked in Derby, that had been designed by Frank Lloyd Wright, and in 1951, it became the first canonical Piarist house. On 8 May 1954, Father Louis Kovari became the first Piarist ordained in the United States. That same year, the Piarists established a House of Studies in Washington, D.C., and the following year, the Piarists bought the former Lea Estate in Devon, PA and opened Devon Preparatory School in it the following year. The following year, the Piarists opened a School for Gifted Children in Buffalo. In 1961, Bishop Coleman Carroll of Miami offered the Piarists Cardinal Gibbons High School, which had just been built in Fort Lauderdale. The Province of the U.S.A. was established in 1975, and in 2011 it merged with the Vice Province of New York and Puerto Rico to become the province of the United States and Puerto Rico. In 1990, Back in New York City, in 1953, the Piarists were given permission to reside in the rectory of St. Nicholas Church, and in 1957, Cardinal Spellman gave his permission to create a canonical house. The Piarists bought the building, and they owned it until 1978 when they were entrusted with Annunciation Parish in upper Manhattan. The Piarists were entrusted with St. Helena Parish and St. Helena School in the Bronx in 2014.

Africa is the most recentcontinent on which the Piarists established communities and schools. The Piarists first went to Africa in 1963, establishing an apostolic mission in Senegal, which became a vice-province in 1997 and then part of the West African province in 2013, along with Guinea-Gabon. They began working in Equatorial Guinea in 1970, and in 1990, some priests from Poland began working in the Cameroon, which became a vicariate in 2000, a vice-province in 2007, and the Central African province in 2013. The two newest African countries in which the Piarists opened communities are the Congo in 2014 and Mozambique in 2017.

=== Order of Poor Clerics Regular of the Mother of God of the Pious Schools ===
The order was restored in 1656 by Pope Alexander VIII who revived the congregation but without its earlier privileges, such as solemn vows granted by Gregory XV and added to the simple vows an oath of perseverance in the congregation. In addition to the usual three vows of poverty, chastity, and obedience.

The privileges of the order were successively restored in 1660, 1669 and 1698. In 1669, Pope Clement IX restored the Piarists to the condition of regulars.

The Piarists are exempt from episcopal jurisdiction and subject only to their general superior, who is elected every six years by the general chapter. A general procurator with four assistants resides at Rome. In virtue of a brief of Alexander VIII (1690) they ceased to be discalced. The members are divided into professed, novices and lay brethren.

Their habit is very similar to that of the Jesuits, a cassock closed in front and a cincture with hanging bands on the left side, although they usually follow the local customs regarding clerical apparel. Their two mottos are Ad majus pietatis incrementum ("For the greater growth of piety") and Pietas et Litterae ("Piety and learning").

Today, there are over 1,400 Piarist religious found chiefly in Italy, Spain, Poland, Hungary, Slovakia, Latin America, West Africa, India, and the Philippines. There is also a growing number of Piarist lay associates. The Order is currently present on five continents (Europe, Asia, Africa, North America, and South America) and in 36 countries.

In 2017, the Order will celebrate the 400th anniversary of the establishment of the religious community on 25 March 1617, as well as the 250th anniversary of the canonisation of Saint Joseph Calasanz, which took place on 17 July 1767. Pope Francis imparted a special Apostolic Blessing on 27 November 2016, the opening day of the Jubilee Year. He also declared that a special Plenary Indulgence would be granted in all churches, chapels, shrines, and parishes where the Piarist Fathers are present to all of the faithful on the occasion of a jubilee celebration, provided they have fulfilled the other necessary requirements to gain the indulgence.

== Education ==
Before the course of study was regulated by the state, a Piarist establishment contained nine classes: reading, writing, elementary mathematics, schola parva or rudimentorum, schola principiorum, grammatica, syntaxis, humanitas or poesis and rhetorica.

One of the most famous Piarists, priest Stanisław Konarski, was the reformer of the Polish education system in the 18th century. To honor his faithful duty, the Polish King Stanisław August Poniatowski created the Sapere Auso medal.

The order's influence led to the subsequent establishment of many other congregations dedicated to education. There are eleven religious teaching orders now in existence that are based on Calasanz's ideas. The founder and order have also had influence on many great educators, such as Saint Jean-Baptiste de la Salle in the eighteenth century, and Saint John Bosco, his great admirer, in the nineteenth century. The influence of the pious schools served as the model for state public school systems in some European countries. The order has educated many important figures in modern history, including a number of saints like Saint John Neumann and Saint Josemaría Escrivá, figures like Pope Pius IX, Victor Hugo, Haydn, Schubert, Johann Mendel.

Piarist Gymnasium in Budapest is noted for a number of exceptional students, two of them Nobel Prize winners, George de Hevesy and George Olah.

== Motto ==
The motto of the Piarist Fathers is "Pietas et Litterae" (Piety and Learning), and at the bottom of most Piarist documents are the initials "AMPI," which when translated mean "For the Glory of God and the Service of our Neighbor." The special Piarist motto for the 400th anniversary jubilee year in 2017 is "to educate, announce, and to transform.".

== Saints, Blesseds, and other holy people ==
Saints

- Joseph Calasanz (11 September 1557 – 25 August 1648), founder, canonised on 16 July 1767
- Pompilio Maria Pirrotti di San Nicola (29 September 1710 – 15 July 1766), priest, canonised on 19 March 1934
- Manuel Míguez González (Faustino of the Incarnation) (24 March 1831 – 8 March 1925), founder of the founder, Calasanzian Institute, Daughters of the Divine Shepherdess, canonised on 15 October 2017

Blesseds

- Pietro Casani della Natività di Maria (8 September 1570 – 17 October 1647), priest and friend of Joseph Calasanz, beatified on 1 October 1995
- Dionisio Pamplona Polo of Saint Barnabas and 12 Companions (died 1936), Martyrs of the Spanish Civil War, beatified on 1 October 1995

Venerables

- Glicerio Landriani (1 March 1588 – 15 February 1618), cleric, declared Venerable on 31 May 1931
- Pedro Díez Gil of the Virgin of Mount Carmel (14 April 1913 – 14 December 1983), priest, declared Venerable on 20 May 2023

Servants of God

- Raffaele (Celestino) Zini (16 December 1825 – 19 April 1892), Archbishop of Siena and founder of the Calsanzian Sisters, declared as Servant of God on 31 July 2004
- Salvador Lizana Torres of the Virgin of Los Pueyos and 25 Companions (died 1936 to 1938), Martyrs of the Spanish Civil War, declared as Servant of God on 21 March 2006
- Antonio Rodríguez Bañuls of Our Lady of the Abandoned and 6 Companions (died 1936), Martyrs of the Spanish Civil War, declared as Servant of God on 5 February 2001
- Francesc Sagrera Riera (8 February 1895 – 22 February 1940), priest, declared as Servant of God on 3 September 1993
- Bruno Martínez Sacedo (9 November 1907 – 29 December 1972), priest, declared as Servant of God on 1 July 1993
- Joaquín Erviti Lazcano of the Virgin of Puy (12 October 1912 – 21 March 1999), priest, declared as Servant of God on 22 September 2004

== Notable Piarists ==
- Ottavio Assarotti, Italian philanthropist and founder of the first Italian school for the deaf
- Stanisław Konarski (d. 1773), famous Polish pedagogue, reformer of education;
- Giovanni Inghirami (d. 1851), astronomer;
- Johann Nepomuk Ehrlich (d. 1864), professor of theology at the University of Prague;
- Ernesto Balducci, author, philosopher and peace activist;
- Sergio Gutiérrez Benítez, Mexican priest who founded an orphanage and famously supported it by becoming a lucha libre wrestler

== Notable students of Piarist schools ==
- Ferenc Deák (1803–1876) Hungarian statesman and minister of justice
- Péter Esterházy (1950–2016) Hungarian writer
- Loránd Eötvös (1848–1919) Hungarian physicist
- Lorenzo Ganganelli (1705–1774), later pope Clement XIV (1769–1774)
- Francisco Goya (1746-1828) Spanish painter
- Franz Lehár (1870–1948) Austro–Hungarian composer
- Sándor Petőfi (1823–1849) Hungarian poet and liberal revolutionary
- Franz Peter Schubert (1797-1828) Austrian composer
- Károly Zipernowsky (1853–1942) Hungarian electrical engineer

== Sources and references ==
- Chisholm, Hugh, ed. (1911). "Piarists" . Encyclopædia Britannica. Vol. 21 (11th ed.). Cambridge University Press. p. 574.
- P. Helyot, Histoire des ordres religieuses (1715), iv. 281.
- J. A. Seyffert, Ordensregeln der Piaristen (Halle, 1783).
- J. Schaller, Gedanken über die Ordensfassung der Piaristen (Prague, 1805).
- A. Heimbucher, Orden und Kongregationen (1897) ii. 271.
- articles by O. Zockler in Herzog-Hauck's Real-encyklopadie für protestantische Theologie (1904), vol. xv.
- C. Kniel in Wetzer and Welte's Kirchen-lexikon (1895), vol. ix.

For Calasanz, see:

- Timon-David, Vie de St Joseph Calasance (Marseilles, 1884).
