= External history =

Social and geopolitical history of a language

External history of a language refers to the social and geopolitical history of the language: migrations, conquests, language contact, and uses of the language in trade, education, literature, law, liturgy, mass media, etc. It is contrasted with internal history, which refers to linguistic forms (phonology, morphology, syntax, and lexicon) and semantics.
