= Internal history =

Internal history of a language refers to the historical development of its linguistic forms (phonology, morphology, syntax, and lexicon) and semantics. It is contrasted with "external history", which refers to the social and geopolitical history of the language.

The history of any language can be divided into external and internal history. The former aspect concerns the political and social developments in the community speaking the language while the latter involves the changes which take place over time within the language itself.

== See also ==
- Alexander Potebnja
