= Žíp =

Žíp Zsip
- Municipality
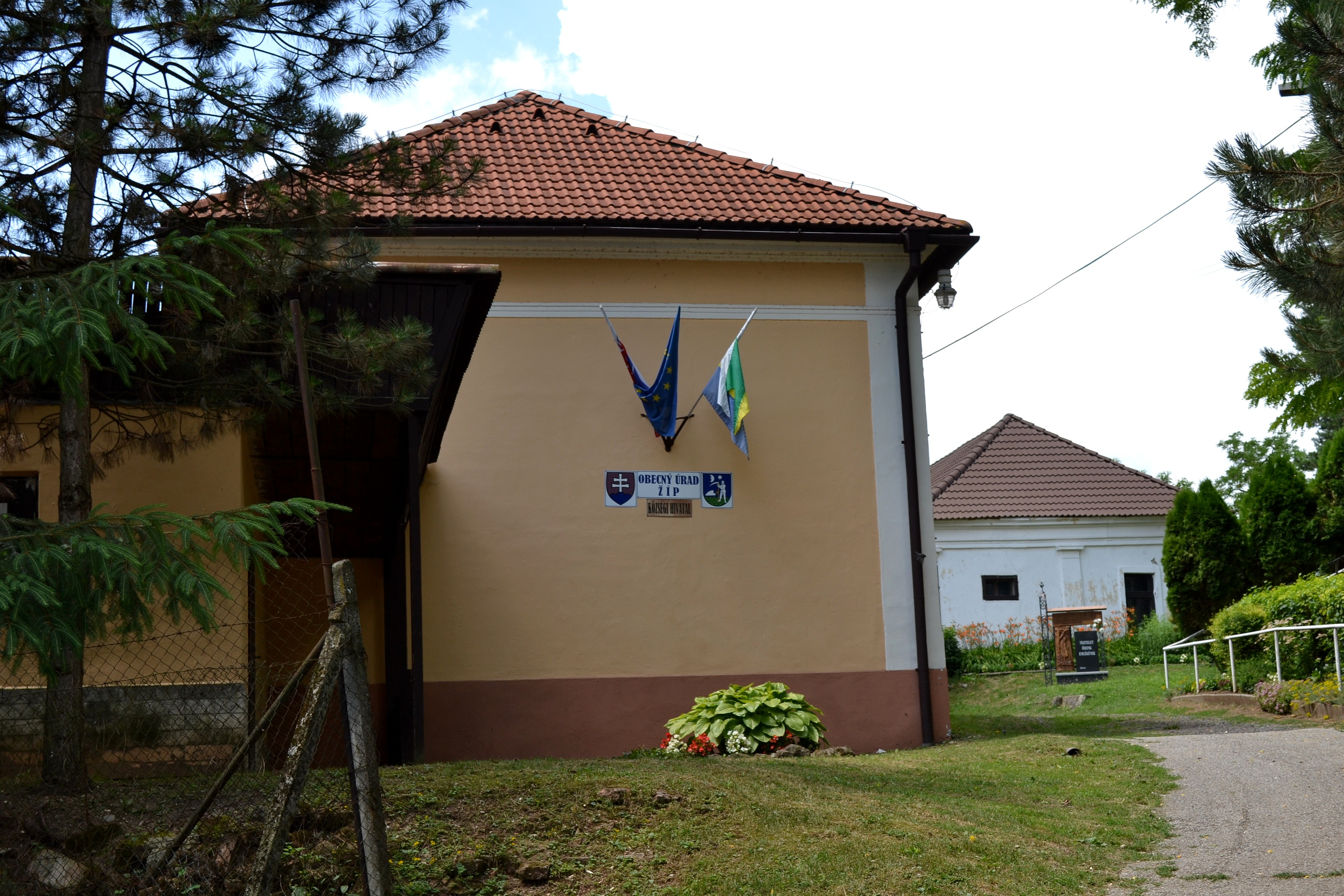

- Flag

- Location of Žíp in the Banská Bystrica Region Location of Žíp in Slovakia
- Coordinates: 48.37°N 20.20°E
- Country: Slovakia
- Region: Banská Bystrica Region
- District: Rimavská Sobota District
- First mentioned: 1295

Area
  - Total: 6.35 km^{2} (2.45 sq mi)
- Elevation: 174 m (571 ft)

Population (2025)
  - Total: 308
- Time zone: UTC+1 (CET)
  - Summer (DST): UTC+2 (CEST)
- Postal code: 980 21
- Area code: +421 47
- Vehicle registration plate (until 2022): RS
- Website: www.obec-zip.sk

Žíp (Hungarian: Zsip) is a village and municipality in the Rimavská Sobota District of the Banská Bystrica Region of Slovakia.

== Geography ==
The municipality lies at an altitude of 174 metres (571 ft) and covers an area of 6.35 km^{2} (2.45 sq mi) (2025).

== Population ==
Population statistic (10 years)
Year	1995	2005	2015	2025
Count	179	238	246	308
Difference		+32.96%	+3.36%	+25.20%

Population statistic
Year	2024	2025
Count	305	308
Difference		+0.98%

It has a population of 308 people (31 December 2025).

=== Ethnicity ===
Census 2021 (1+ %)
Ethnicity	Number	Fraction
Hungarian	261	92.88%
Not found out	17	6.04%
Slovak	16	5.69%
Romani	10	3.55%
Total	281	

In year 2021 was 281 people by ethnicity 261 as Hungarian, 17 as Not found out, 16 as Slovak and 10 as Romani.

Note on population: The difference values of population numbers in the table "Population statistic" and in the sections "Ethnicity" & "Religion" is caused by the use of various statistical methods.

=== Religion ===
Census 2021 (1+ %)
Religion	Number	Fraction
Calvinist Church	127	45.2%
Roman Catholic Church	86	30.6%
None	52	18.51%
Not found out	12	4.27%
Evangelical Church	3	1.07%
Total	281	

In year 2021 was 281 people by religion 127 from Calvinist Church, 86 from Roman Catholic Church, 52 from None, 12 from Not found out, 3 from Evangelical Church and 1 from Christian Congregations in Slovakia.
