= Zippe =

Zippe may refer to:

== People ==
- Franz Xaver Zippe (1791–1863), Bohemian mineralogist
- Gernot Zippe (1917–2008), German engineer
- Stanislav Zippe (born 1943), Czech artist

== Other ==
- Zippe-type centrifuge
- Zippe, a term used in the card game of Skat

== See also ==
- Zipp (disambiguation)
