= Presl =

Presl is a surname. Notable people with the surname include:

- Carl Borivoj Presl (C.Presl, 1794–1852), Czech botanist, younger brother of Jan Svatopluk Presl.
- Jan Svatopluk Presl (J.Presl, 1791–1849), Bohemian natural scientist, older brother of Carl Borivoj Presl.
