= Athanasius Safar =

Syriac Catholic bishop

Athanasius Safar of Mardin (Syriac: ܐܬܢܣܝܘܣ ܣܦܪ ܕܡܪܕܝܢ; also known by his original Arabic name, Safar al-‘Attar al-Mardīnī; 1638 – 4 April 1728 or 1730) was the Syriac Catholic bishop of Mardin (then Ottoman Empire, now Turkey). He completed the first edition of the Syriac Breviary in 1696.

Safar was born into a Syriac Orthodox family in Mardin in 1638. He converted to Catholicism in 1679 and was ordained bishop of Mardin on 11 March 1685 in Aleppo. He carried out missions in Persia and later in Paris, for François Piquet, the French consul in Aleppo. In 1684, he left Isfahan, traveling via Diyarbekir and Aleppo to Alexandretta, arriving in Marseille in August 1685. He claimed the same see as another bishop, Timothée Karnûsh, who had also arrived in Rome fleeing persecution of Christians. In 1687, Safar unsuccessfully demanded that money deposited with Karnûsh be given to him.

Safar obtained permission from Pope Innocent XI to travel to the Americas. In 1689, Safar boarded a ship from Spain to Mexico with a servant. He collected a large sum, 46,000 pezzi di otto, by 1694, when he was denounced by local Franciscans and arrested. Safar had to hand over the money to papal authorities, who spent it on maintaining the Syrian chapel in Rome. Nevertheless, Safar collected a pension and lived comfortably in Rome for the rest of his life. He invited his nephew, Giovanni Domenico Safar, to join him; the younger Safar collected a pension from 1736. After his death in 1753, his wife and unmarried daughter collected money until as late as 1770.
