= Michal Šafařík =

Slovak ice hockey player (1977–2020)

- Born: 24 January 1977; Vsetín, Czechoslovakia
- Died: 19 November 2020 (aged 43)
- Height: 6 ft 1 in (185 cm)
- Weight: 211 lb (96 kg; 15 st 1 lb)
- Shoots: right
- Slovak Extraliga team: HC Slovan Bratislava

Michal Šafařík (24 January 1977 – 19 November 2020) was a Czech professional ice hockey player.

He played with HC Slovan Bratislava in the Slovak Extraliga, where he won a national championship.

Šafařík died on 19 November 2020, aged 43.

== Honours ==
VHK Vsetín

- Czech national ice hockey championship (Czech Extraliga)
  - Gold – 1996/1997, 1997/1998, 1998/1999, 2000/2001

HC Slovan Bratislava

- Slovak national ice hockey championship (Slovak Extraliga)
  - Gold – 2002/2003

HC Hamé Zlín

- Czech national ice hockey championship (Czech Extraliga)
  - Gold – 2003/2004

== Sources ==
- EuroHockey.net
