= Safar (given name) =

Safar (Azerbaijani: Səfər) is a male name found in Azerbaijan and Iranian Azerbaijan. People with the name include:

- Safar Ghahremani, an Iranian leftist dissident
- Safar Mehdiyev, an Azerbaijani general
- Safar Abiyev, former Azerbaijani defense minister

== See also ==
- Safar (surname)
- Safar (disambiguation)
