= Ruslan Safarov =

Russian footballer

Personal information
- Full name: Ruslan Ibragim-ogly Safarov
- Date of birth: 6 September 1979 (age 47)
- Place of birth: Sumqayit, Azerbaijani SSR
- Height: 1.89 m (6 ft 2 in)
- Position: Goalkeeper

Senior career*
Years	Team	Apps	(Gls)
2000	FC Titan Reutov	4	(0)
2004	FC Avangard Kursk	0	(0)
2005	FC Avangard-2 Kursk (D4)		
2006–2010	FC Avangard Kursk	3	(0)
- * Club domestic league appearances and goals

Ruslan Ibragim-ogly Safarov (Russian: Руслан Ибрагим-оглы Сафаров; born 6 September 1979) is a former Russian professional football player.

== Club career ==
He played in the Russian Football National League for FC Avangard Kursk in 2007.
