= Zip Fires =

Irish manufacturer

Zip Fires is an Irish manufacturing company, making firelighters and related products; it is the market leader in firelighters in several markets.

== Products ==
A Zip firelighter or Zip cube is a packaged small block of solid fuel containing kerosene, sold as a firelighter in Ireland, Canada and the United States, also in the UK, France & Belgium where they are the leading brand. Zip also manufacture a "Clean Wrap", "Fast & Clean" or "Wrapped" product- the kerosene is encapsulated within a lightable plastic wrapper which keeps hands clean and rooms odour free.

Zip has diversified into "natural firelighters", made of compressed wood fibre and wax, and in the UK and Ireland Zip also supply "convenience firelogs" and the pre-assembled "Fire In A Bag", along with a range of BBQ products.
