= Zip gun =

Zip gun may refer to:

- Improvised firearm § Zip guns
- Hand-Held Maneuvering Unit, a device used by astronauts on spacewalks
- The ZIP .22 pistol by the U.S. Fire Arms Manufacturing Company
- Bolan's Zip Gun, a 1975 album by the band T. Rex
- Zipgun, a 1990s punk rock band from Seattle, Washington, US
