= Zip Water =

Australian manufacturer of hot water dispensers

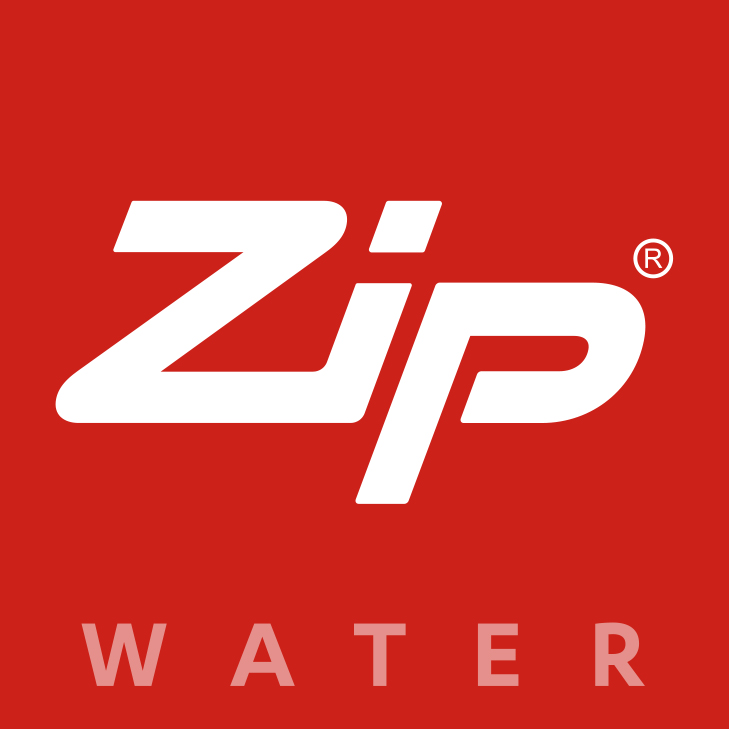
- Founder: Michael Crouch
- Owner: Culligan Water
- Website: https://www.zipwater.com

Zip Water is owned by Culligan Water International. It manufactures and sells instant boiling water systems. Their manufactured products are currently sold in more than seventy countries, with uses in kitchens, hospitals, universities, schools, and homes.

In the United Kingdom, Zip has customer service offices in London, Birmingham, Manchester and Dereham, warehousing in Dereham and a manufacturing facility in Southport, Merseyside. In New Zealand, Zip trades under the brand name of Zenith Heaters, with a customer service office in Auckland. Zip distributors are located in Europe (Germany), South Africa, mainland China, Hong Kong, Singapore, Philippines, Cyprus, Taiwan and Thailand.

The company manufactures water dispensing systems for residential and commercial markets. Following its expansion, it diversified into water chillers and commercial boiling units.

== Early history ==
Zip began manufacturing and marketing water design systems in Australia from about 1947. Prior to 1962, the company focused primarily on water heaters for kitchens and hot water heaters for bathrooms.

An early Zip innovation was a manually operated over-sink boiling water heater with a "ready whistle" and automatic cut-off, which became a popular fixture in Australian restaurants and community kitchens during the 1950s and 1960s. The company was acquired by Crouch in 1962.

In 1991, Zip Heaters (UK) Limited was formed to take over UK distribution, and a distributor for Europe, based in Germany, was appointed in 2002. More recently, distributors were appointed in China and a Zip company, Zenith Heaters, became responsible for distribution in New Zealand.

In August 2017, Zip Water was acquired by the United States-based firm Culligan International.

== Product development ==
During the 1960s, Zip expanded its range of over-sink boiling water heaters catering for canteen, restaurant, factory and office kitchens needing high volumes of boiling water. Larger capacity boiling water heaters were also manufactured for use in dairies.

By 1975, Zip added its first on-wall instant boiling water heaters with enhanced energy efficiency and an increased capacity measured in number of cups of boiling water per hour. Zip then also created the Zip Miniboil, the first ever small on-wall instant boiling water heater. The Zip Miniboil was followed closely by the Zip Tea Tap, an under-sink, non-pressurized instant boiling water system. It delivered water within one degree of boiling point, with little or no steam or splatter. The Zip Tea Tap originated a patented steam condensing system to eliminate the emission of excessive steam in conjunction with boiling water. By 1985, Zip Tea Tap was so well accepted in Australia that it was specified for all of the kitchens and Members' offices in the new Parliament House, Canberra.

In the early 1990s, Zip introduced a range of advanced on-wall instant boiling water heaters under the Zip Hydroboil brand. These were far more compact, energy-efficient and easier to service than any existing equivalents.

By 1996, Zip introduced an air-cooled Zip HydroTap under-bench filtered instant boiling water systems which also dispensed filtered chilled drinking water from a single touch-button electronic tap. By 2004, the initial Zip HydroTap was superseded by re-designed product engineering and a distinctive lever-action electronic tap offering precise water flow control, safety, and power-saving features, plus a "font" accessory which enabled the tap to be positioned away from any sink, with independent drainage. Zip HydroTap models introduced in 2012 provide sparkling chilled and filtered drinking water (in addition to boiling and chilled) from one tap. The Zip HydroTap All-In-One launched in 2012, gives boiling, chilled and sparkling filtered water plus hot and cold water.
