= Castle of Diósgyőr =

Medieval castle in Miskolc, Hungary

Coordinates: 48.097452°N 20.689418°E

Quondam, original medieval looks of the Castle

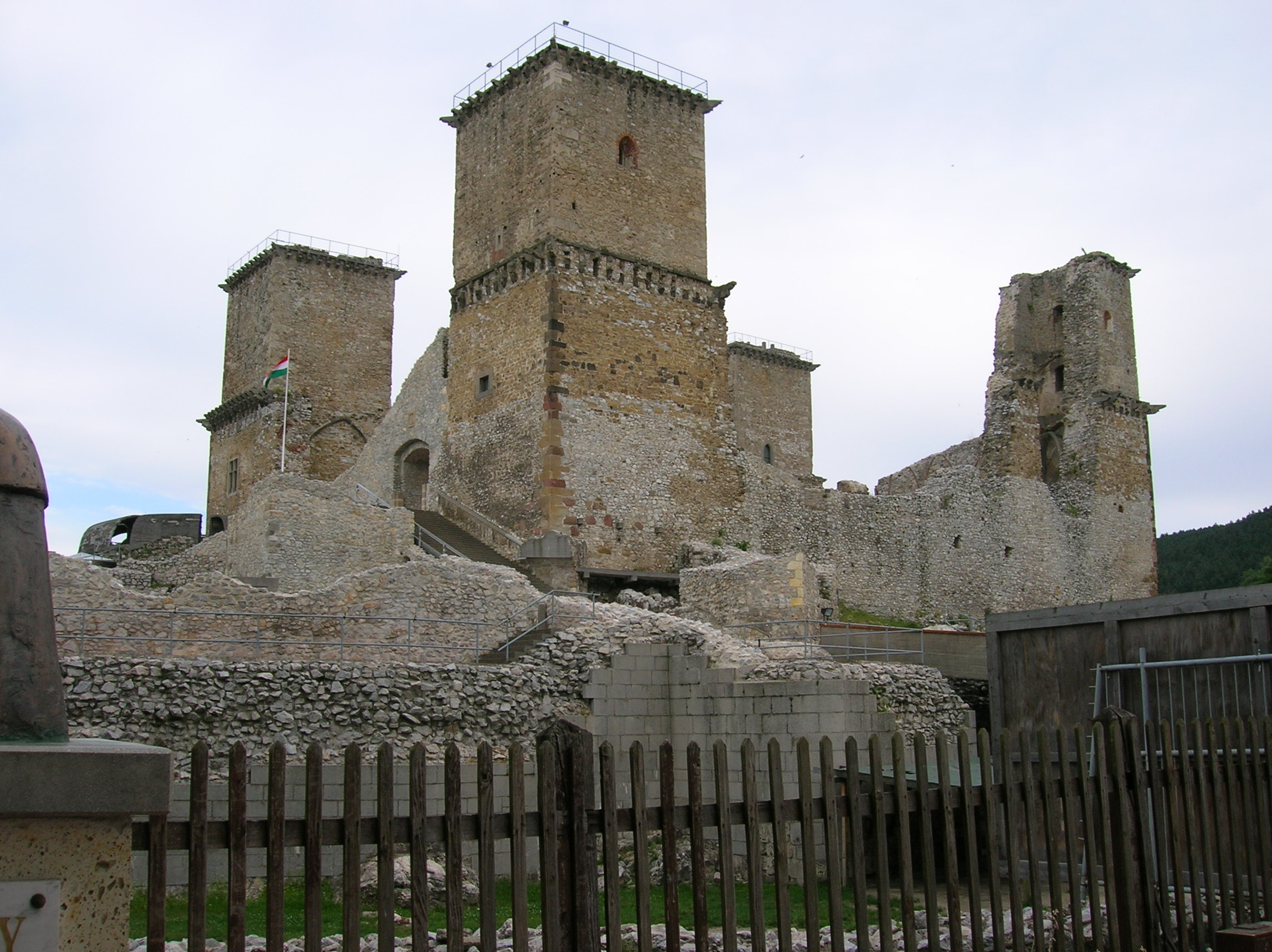
The castle ruins in 2005

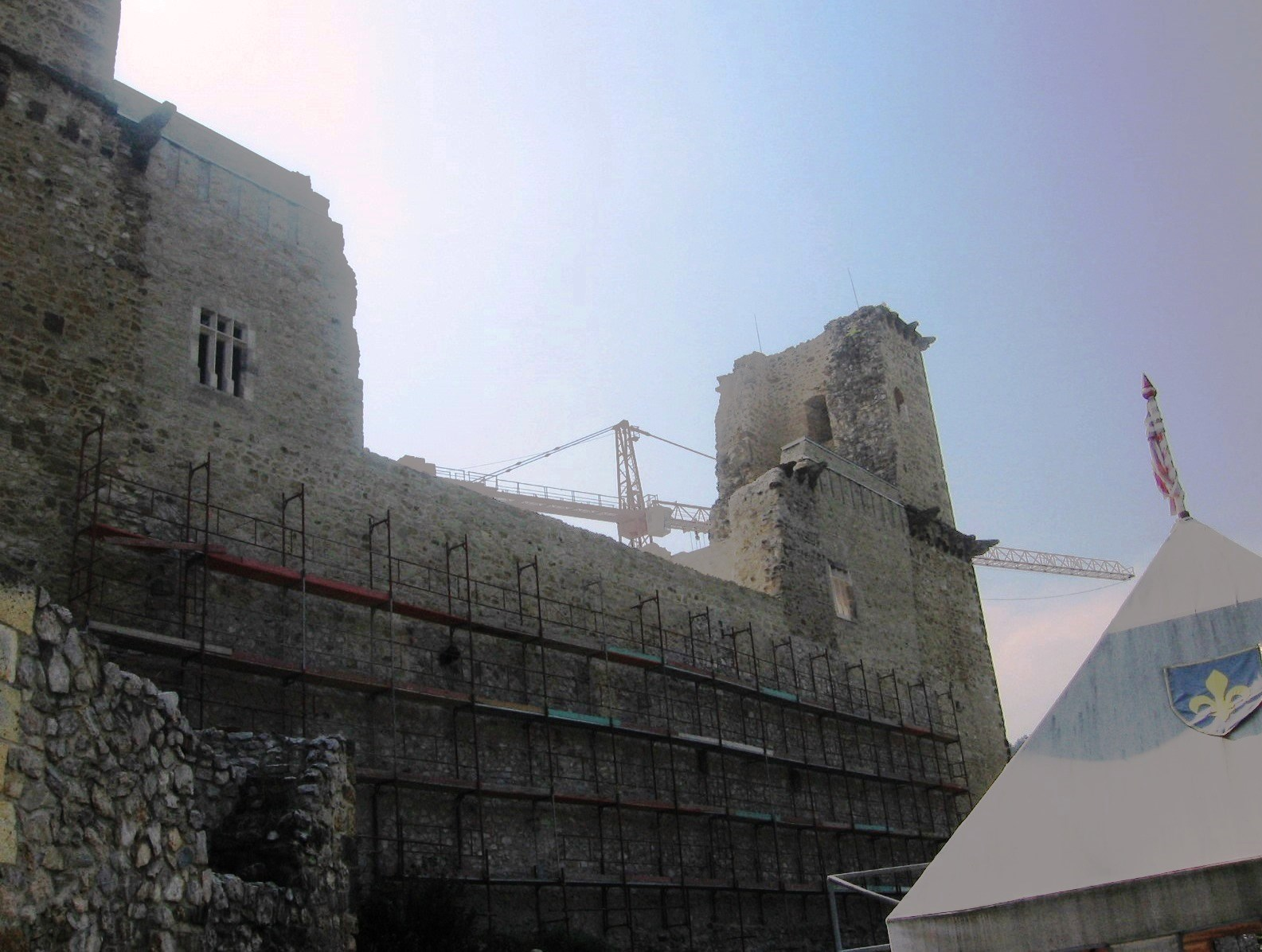
The castle during the rebuilding phase

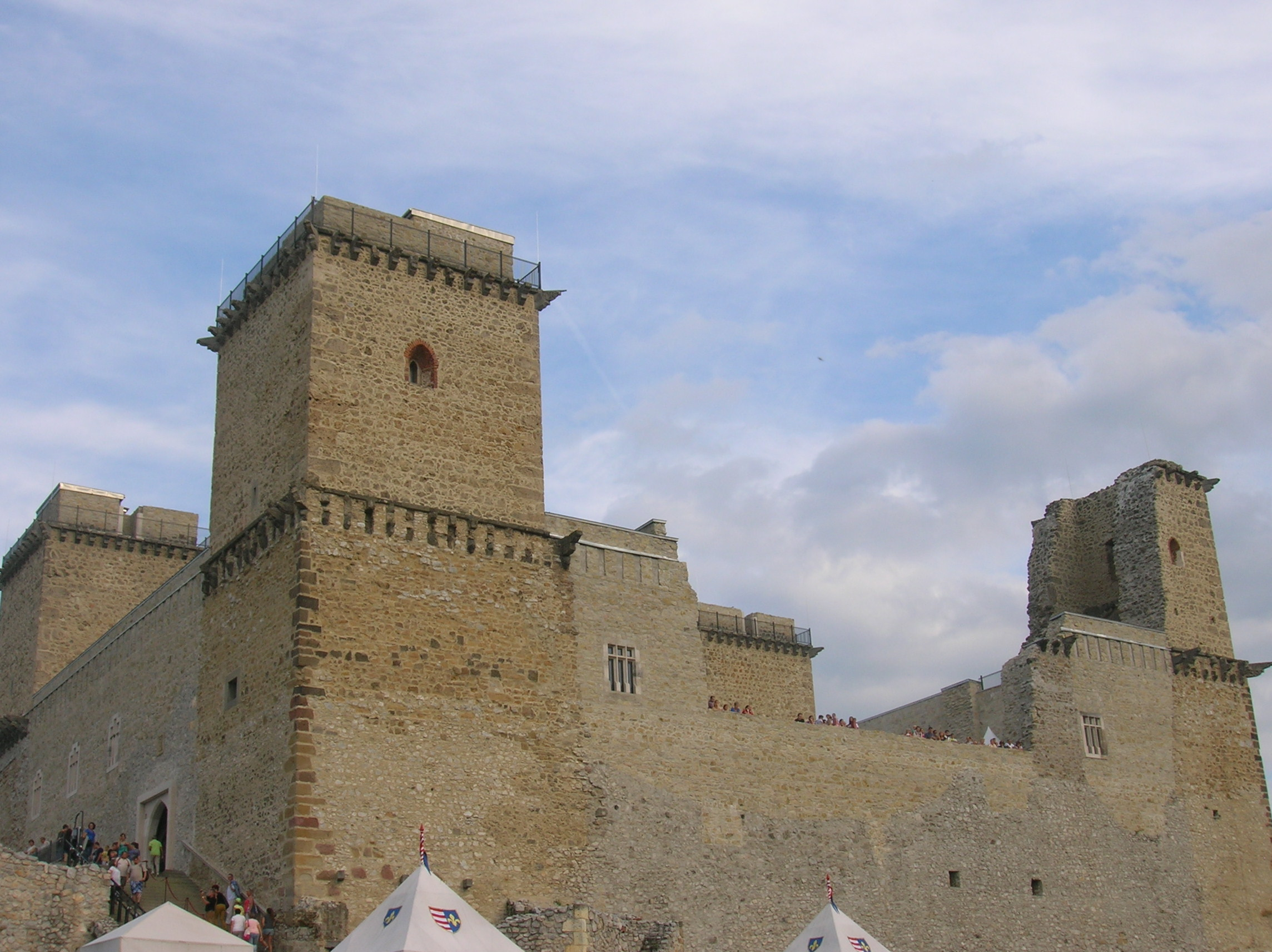
The castle today

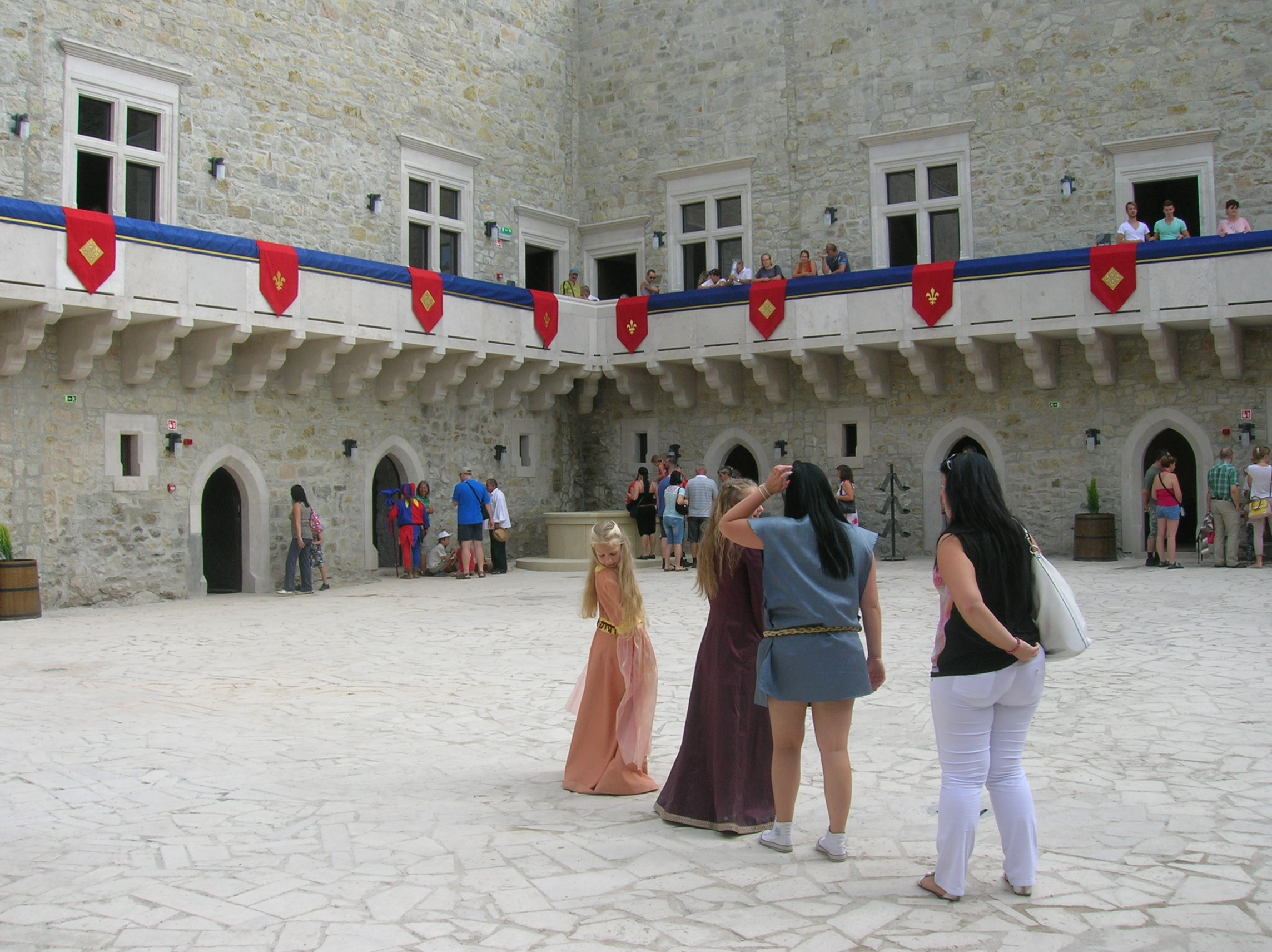
The castle today

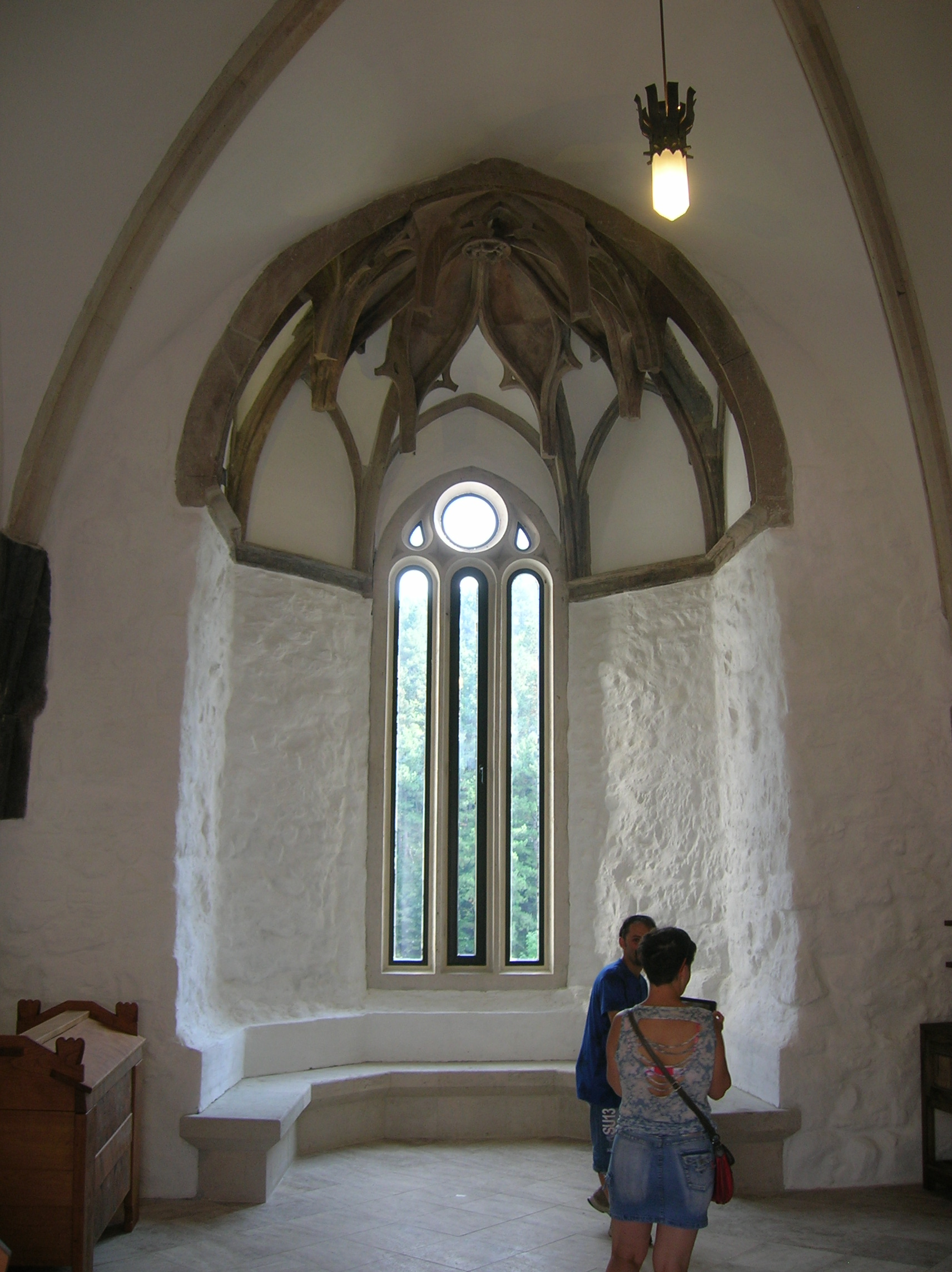
The restored chapel of the castle

The Castle of Diósgyőr is a medieval castle in the historical town of Diósgyőr which is now part of the Northern Hungarian city Miskolc. The first Castle of Diósgyőr was built probably in the 12th century and was destroyed during the Mongol invasion (1241–42). The current, Gothic castle was built after the invasion and reached the peak of its importance during the reign of King Louis the Great (1342–1382). Later it became a wedding gift for the queens of Hungary, which it remained until the Ottoman invasion of Hungary in the 16th century. By the end of the 17th century it was already in ruins. Archaeological excavations of the site have been made, beginning in the 1960s. In 2014 the castle was restored; the rooms are furnished with Mediaeval-style furniture.

== History ==
The first castle was built in the 12th century, it is likely that it was an earthwork and timber castle and was destroyed during the Mongol invasion (1241–1242). The castle that stands today was probably built by King Béla IV, who, after the Mongols left the country, ordered a castle to be built on every hilltop. In the earliest times the castle was an oval structure with a rounded donjon, surrounded by a polygonal outer wall. In 1316 it was mentioned as "new castle", which confirms the theory that it was built in place of a destroyed castle. Judging from a document listing the taxes paid by towns in 1330 it seems the town around the castle was one of the richest towns of the county.

The castle had its prime during the reign of Louis I (Louis the Great). Its importance lay in standing near the road leading to Poland (the mother of Louis the Great, Elżbieta Lokietkówna, was a Polish princess; Louis himself became King of Poland in 1370.) The king had the castle rebuilt and modernised. Surrounded by several walls, the inner castle was built around a rectangular courtyard, and it had four towers, one on each corner. On the first floor were the storerooms and on the second floor were the rooms and the Knights' Hall, which was 25 meters (82 ft) long and 13 meters (43 ft) wide. The modernising of the castle was finished under the reign of Louis' daughter Mary. The castle was surrounded by a 4-meter (13 ft) deep moat.

In 1364 the nearby town Miskolc was annexed to the Diósgyőr estate. In 1381 the Peace Treaty of Turin was signed in the Diósgyőr Castle. In the treaty the Italian town of Venice was compelled to raise the flag of the Anjou dynasty on the St. Mark square every Sunday. In the north-eastern tower of the castle there is a waxworks exhibition showing the wax figures of King Louis and the Venetian envoy.

Diósgyőr lost some of its importance when the personal union between Hungary and Poland ended (Louis shared the two countries between his two daughters Mary and Jadwiga). For the next few centuries the castle was a holiday residence for queens. The last queen owning the castle was Maria, wife of Louis II. She gave up the castle formally in 1546 (by this time it had been occupied by the ruling prince of Transylvania).

When the Ottoman army began to occupy the southern territories of Hungary, the castle was fortified. Its owners, the Gyarmati Balassa family turned it into a large fortress, and they had an Italian-style rondelle built to the north-western tower. The slim turrets were replaced by strong bastions. This was the last time the castle was rebuilt; after 1564 the owners changed frequently, and the castle slowly deteriorated. In 1596 the Ottoman army occupied the Eger Castle and defeated the Christian army at Mezőkeresztes. The Diósgyőr Castle fell too; it was built to be a holiday residence and was never intended to be a large fortress that withstands the siege of a foreign army. From this time Diósgyőr was under Ottoman occupation and the area was ruled by the Pasha of Eger until 1687 when this part of the country was freed from Turkish rule. By this time the castle lost all of its military importance.

== The castle today ==
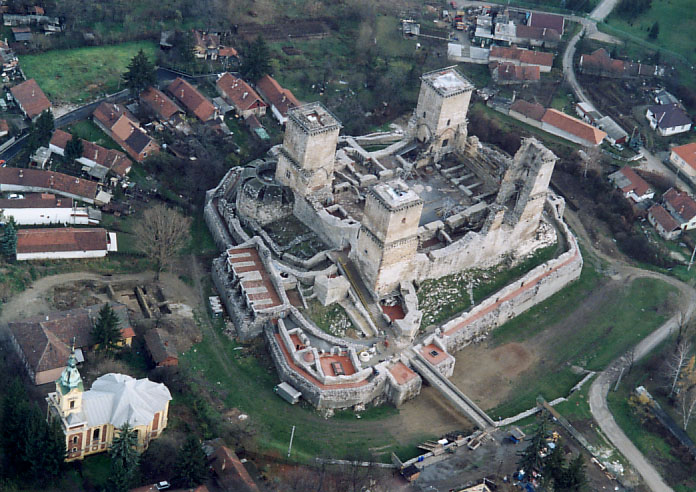
Aerial view of the ruins of the castle before the reconstruction

The restoration of the castle began in 1953. Originally only the parts threatened with collapsing were restored, the archaeological excavation began only in 1960.

Before 2014 there was an exhibition of the history of the castle and the Pauline monastery, a weapons exhibition and the waxworks showing the signing of the Torino Peace Treaty in the northeastern tower (which belonged to the King's quarters). The north-western tower functions as a looking-tower, with a view on Diósgyőr and the surrounding hills; on the ground floor there is a small mint where tourists can make commemorative coins with their own hands. The south-western tower is in ruins. One of the main tourist attractions of the castle is a large waxworks exhibition in the outer castle. This exhibition is one of the largest waxworks exhibitions of Central Europe and it shows six scenes of everyday life in medieval Diósgyőr.

The Castle Plays are held twice in every year (May and August). Tournaments and open air plays are held at the castle, and there is a medieval fair next to the castle. An important musical event, the Kaláka Folk Festival is held on the second weekend of July each year.

Unlike the castles of Eger and Kőszeg, the Diósgyőr Castle is surrounded by modern concrete buildings instead of a historical town, but it is still a popular tourist destination, thanks to the castle plays, the museum, the waxworks exhibitions and Mrs. Déry's House, a small museum dedicated to the popular 19th-century actress Róza Széppataki Déry, in the house where she lived.

== Literary associations ==
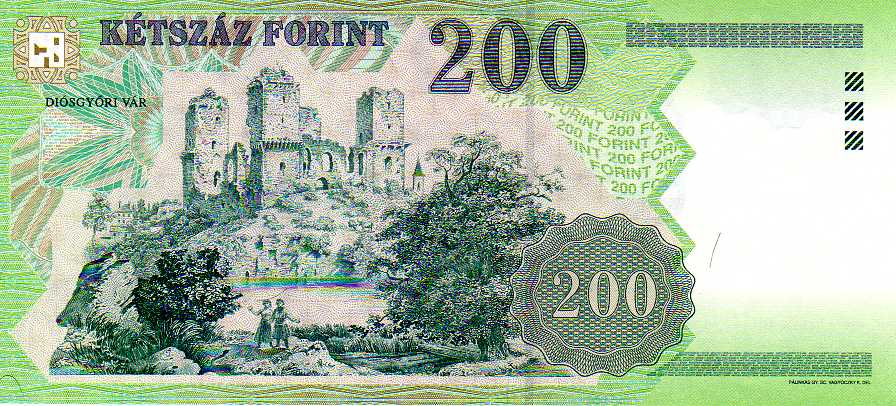
The 200 Ft banknote

- On the wall of the castle there is a memorial plate commemorating the visit of the famous poet Sándor Petőfi to Diósgyőr on July 8, 1847. He wrote his poem Alkony ("Sunset") here.

Petőfi Sándor: Alkony	Sándor Petőfi: Sunset
Olyan a nap, mint a hervadt rózsa,	The sun bends her head down slowly
Lankadtan bocsátja le fejét;	Like a fading, fragrant rose
Levelei, halvány sugárok,	Her faint beams, her soft golden leaves
Bús mosollyal hullnak róla szét.	Fall down in sad, silent glows.
Néma, csendes a világ körűlem,	The world is silent 'round me, the
Távol szól csak egy kis estharang,	Sweet sound of the evening bell
Távol s szépen, mintha égbül jönne	Seems to come from the sweetest dream
Vagy egy édes álomtól e hang.	Or from where the angels dwell.
Hallgatom mély figyelemmel. Oh ez	I'm listening, and it feels so
Ábrándos hang jólesik nekem.	Good to hear this dreamy sound
Tudj isten, mit érzek, mit nem érzek,	God only knows what do I feel
Tudja isten, hol jár az eszem.	God only knows what's on my mind.

== Trivia ==
- The original picture that was used on the back of the 200 Forint banknote (in circulation between 1998 and 15 November 2009) is on display for visitors in the museum of the north-east tower.
- The spring that was used to fill the moat with water is now used as a water source for a public swimming pool nearby.

== Gallery ==
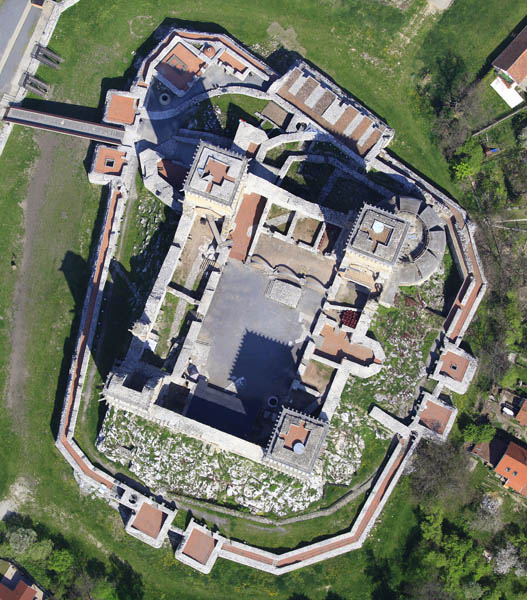

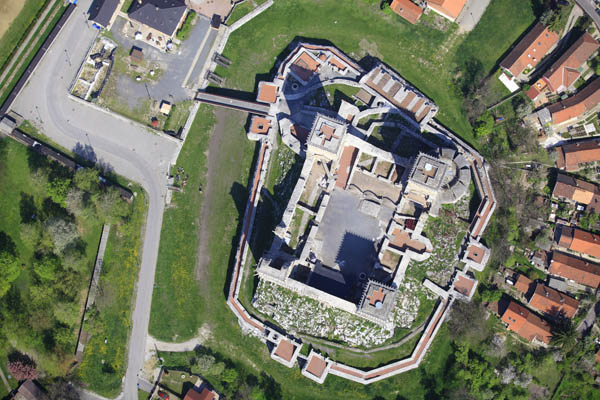

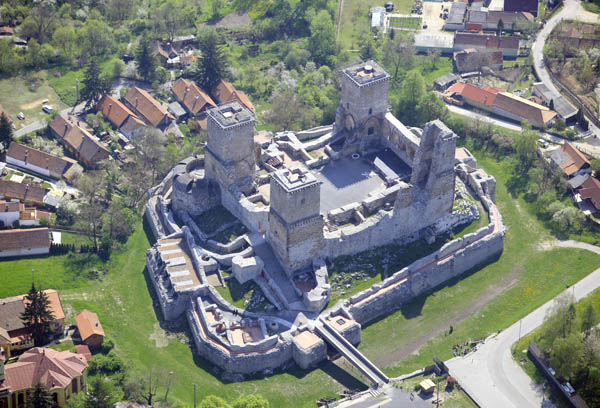

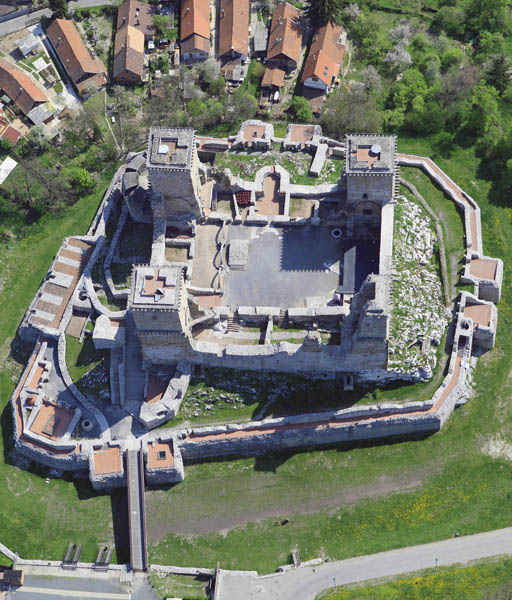

== Sources ==
- (in Hungarian) Várépítészetünk, Főszerkesztő Gerő László, Műszaki Könyvkiadó, Budapest, 1975, ISBN 963-10-0861-4
- (in Hungarian) Czeglédy I.: A diósgyőri vár, Budapest, 1971
- (in Hungarian) Gerő László: A magyarországi várépítészet, Budapest, 1968
- (in Hungarian) Ferenczy K.: A diósgyőri vár műemlék-helyreállítási javaslatai, Magyar Építőművészet, 1961
- (in Hungarian) A vár történetét bemutató kiállítás
- (in Hungarian) Csorba Csaba: Regélő váraink. Javított kiadás, Helikon, Budapest, 2005. p. 65–70.
